= Mausoleum =

Burial chamber of a deceased person

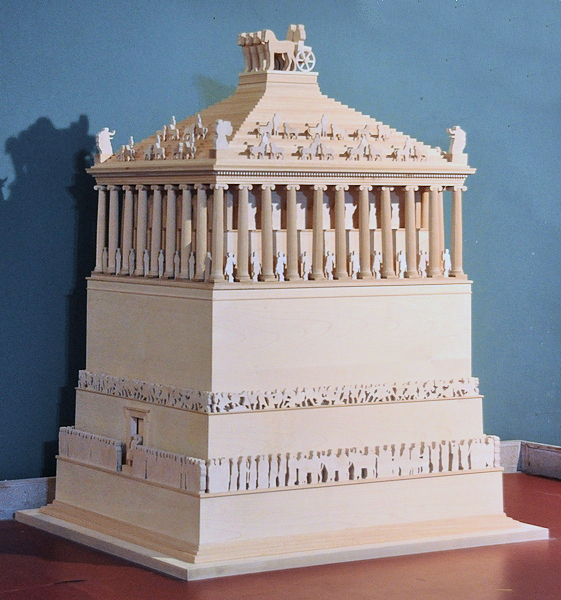
Model of the Mausoleum at Halicarnassus (near modern-day Bodrum in Turkey), the grave of King Mausolus, the Persian satrap of Caria from whom the word mausoleum was derived

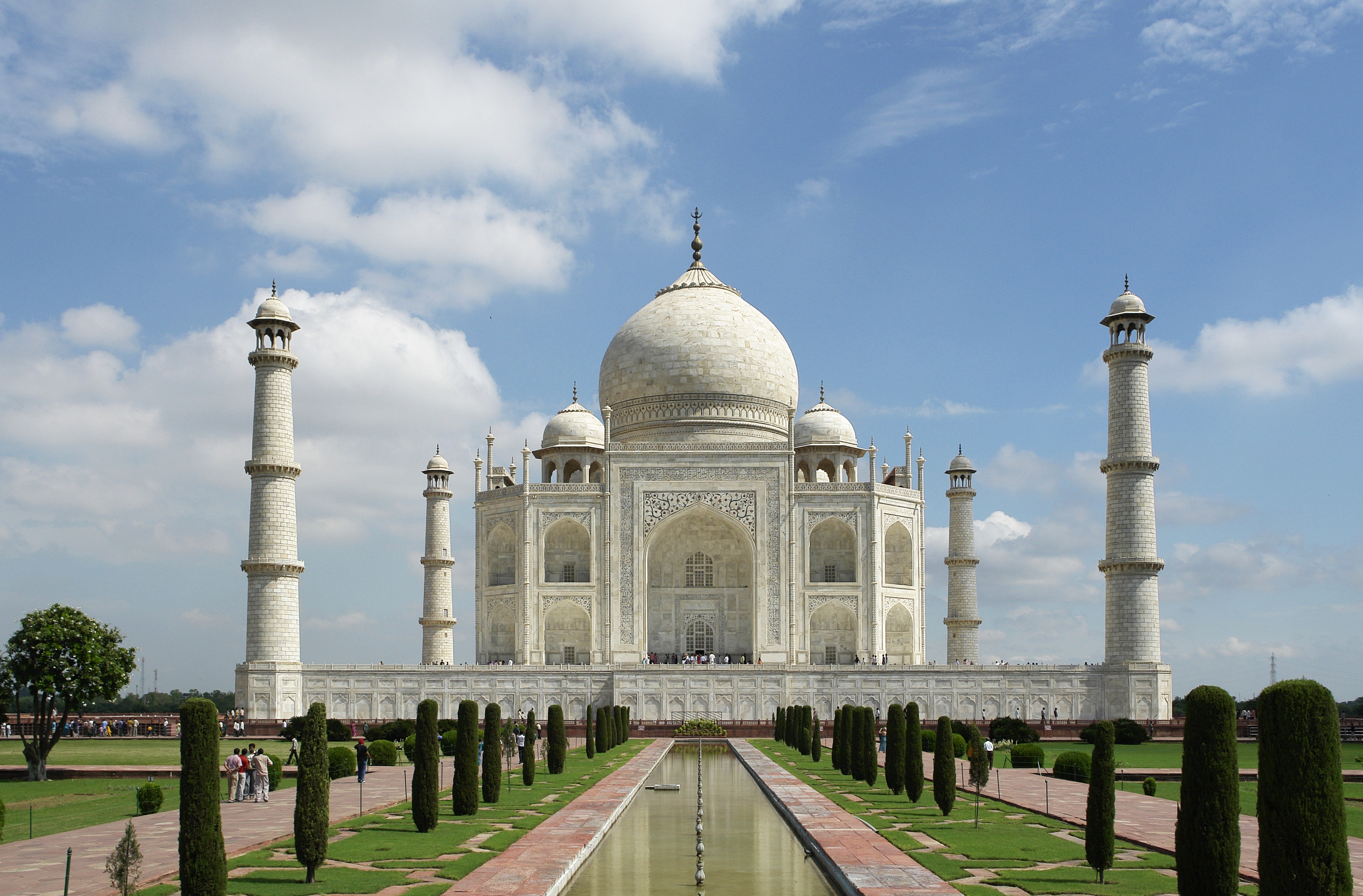
The Taj Mahal in Agra, India, a UNESCO World Heritage Site

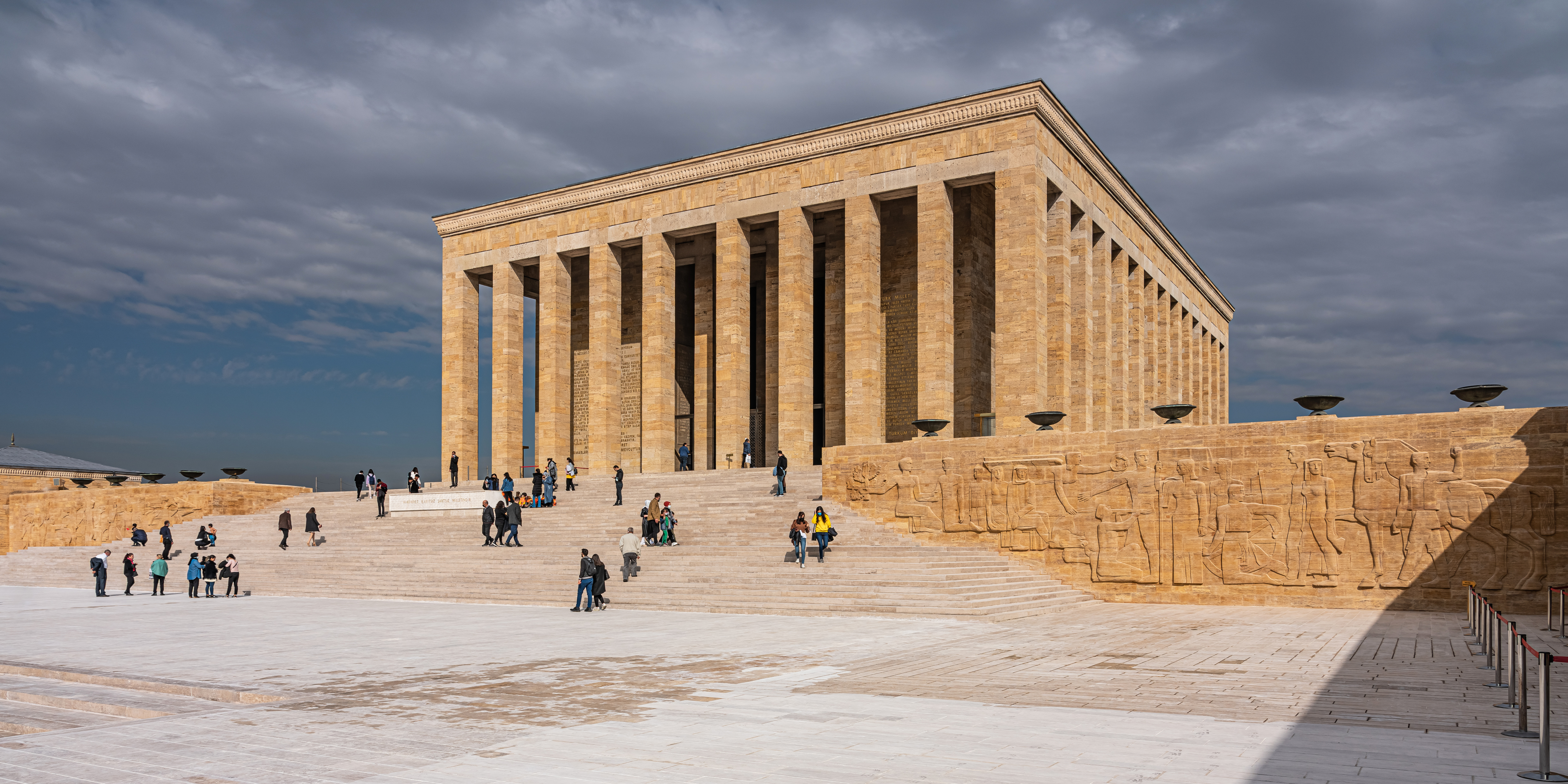
Anıtkabir is the mausoleum of Atatürk, leader of the Turkish National Movement during the Turkish War of Independence, the founder and first President of the Republic of Turkey. It attracts around 3.5 million tourists yearly.

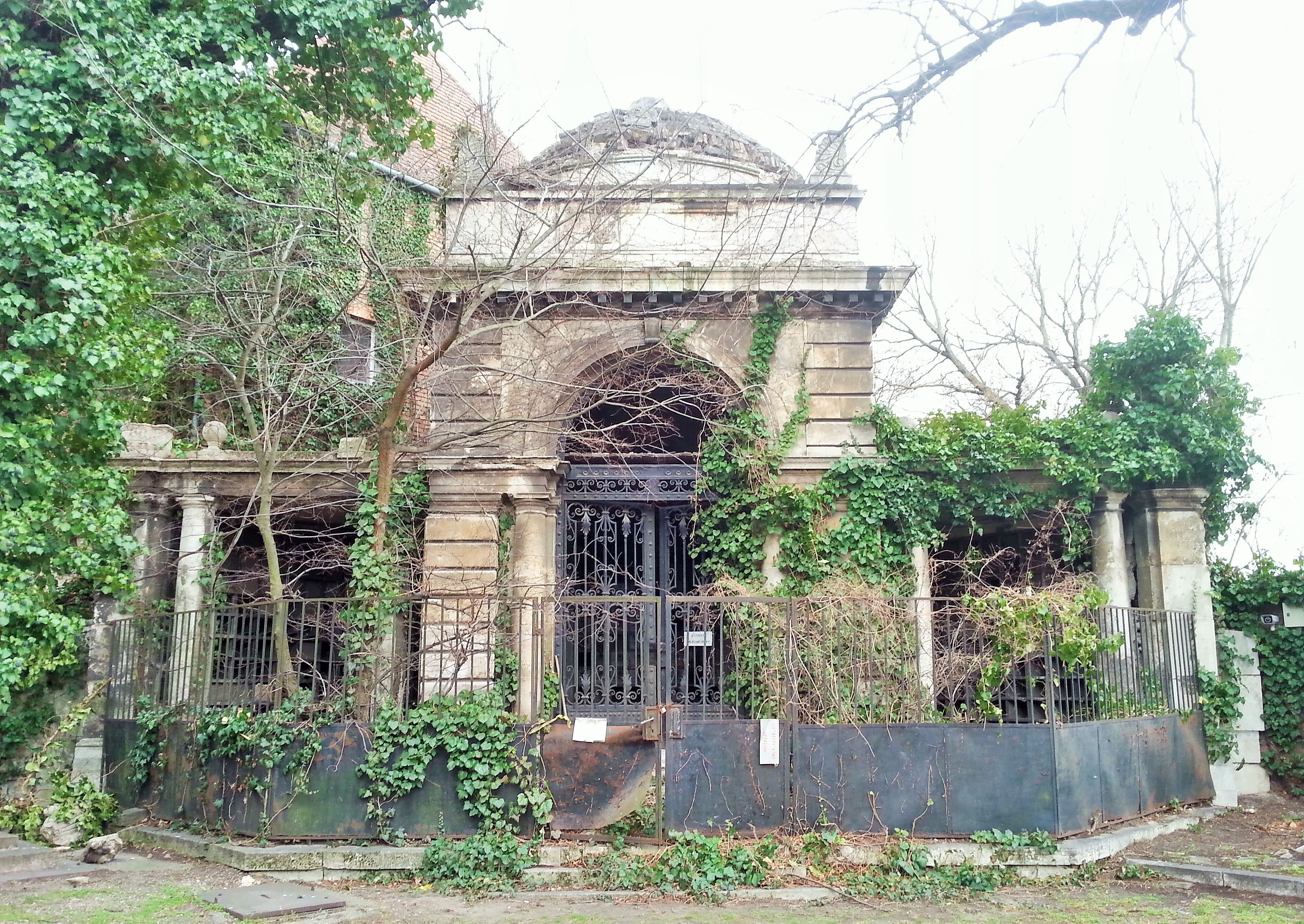
The Thalmayer mausoleum, one of the many ruined mausoleums (Hungary, Budapest, Fiume Road Graveyard)

A mausoleum (plural: mausolea) (Note: The plurals mausoleums and mausolea are both used in English, although mausoleums is more common.) is an external free-standing building or standalone structure constructed as a monument enclosing the burial chamber of a deceased person or people. A mausoleum without the person's remains is called a cenotaph. A mausoleum may be considered a type of tomb, or the tomb may be considered to be within the mausoleum.

== Overview ==
The word mausoleum (from the Ancient Greek: μαυσωλεῖον) derives from the Mausoleum at Halicarnassus (near modern-day Bodrum in Turkey), the grave of King Mausolus, the Persian satrap of Caria, whose large tomb was one of the Seven Wonders of the Ancient World.

Mausolea were historically, and still may be, large and impressive constructions for a deceased leader or other person of importance. However, smaller mausolea soon became popular with the gentry and nobility in many countries. In the Roman Empire, these were often in necropoles or along roadsides: the via Appia Antica retains the ruins of many private mausolea for kilometres outside Rome. When Christianity became dominant, mausolea fell out of use.

Later, mausolea became particularly popular in Europe and its colonies during the early modern and modern periods. A single mausoleum may be permanently sealed. A mausoleum encloses a burial chamber either wholly above ground or within a burial vault below the superstructure. This contains the body or bodies, probably within sarcophagi or interment niches. Modern mausolea may also act as columbaria (a type of mausoleum for cremated remains) with additional cinerary urn niches. Mausolea may be located in a cemetery, a churchyard or on private land.

In the United States, the term may be used for a burial vault below a larger facility, such as a church. The Cathedral of Our Lady of the Angels in Los Angeles, California, for example, has 6,000 sepulchral and cinerary urn spaces for interments in the lower level of the building. It is known as the "crypt mausoleum". In Europe, these underground vaults are sometimes called crypts or catacombs.

A chapel mausoleum or mausoleum chapel in a cemetery accommodates open or closed-casket funeral services prior to traditional interments.

== Notable mausoleums ==
=== Africa ===
==== Algeria ====
- El Alia Cemetery in Oued Smar.
- Jedars, thirteen ancient monumental Berber mausoleums located south of Tiaret.
- Madghacen, a royal Numidian mausoleum from the 3rd century, Batna.
- Royal Mausoleum of Mauretania, monumental grave of the Numidian Berber king Juba II and the Queen Cleopatra Selene II located on the road between Cherchell and Algiers, in Tipaza Province.
- The tomb of Masinissa (Soumâa) in El Khroub
- Mausoleum of Sidi Abderrahmane Et-Thaalibi in Algiers.
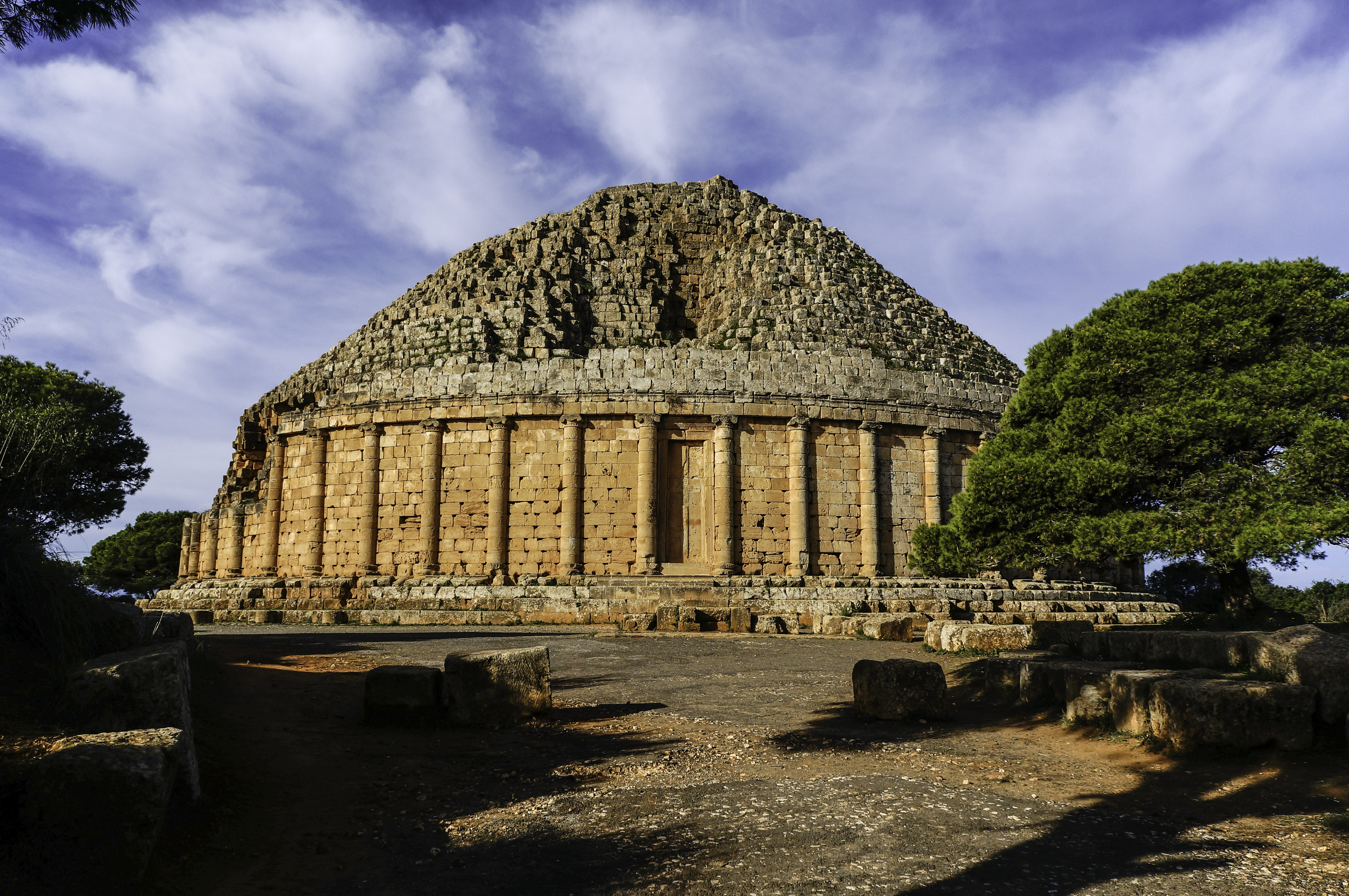
Royal Mausoleum of Mauretania (Tipaza)

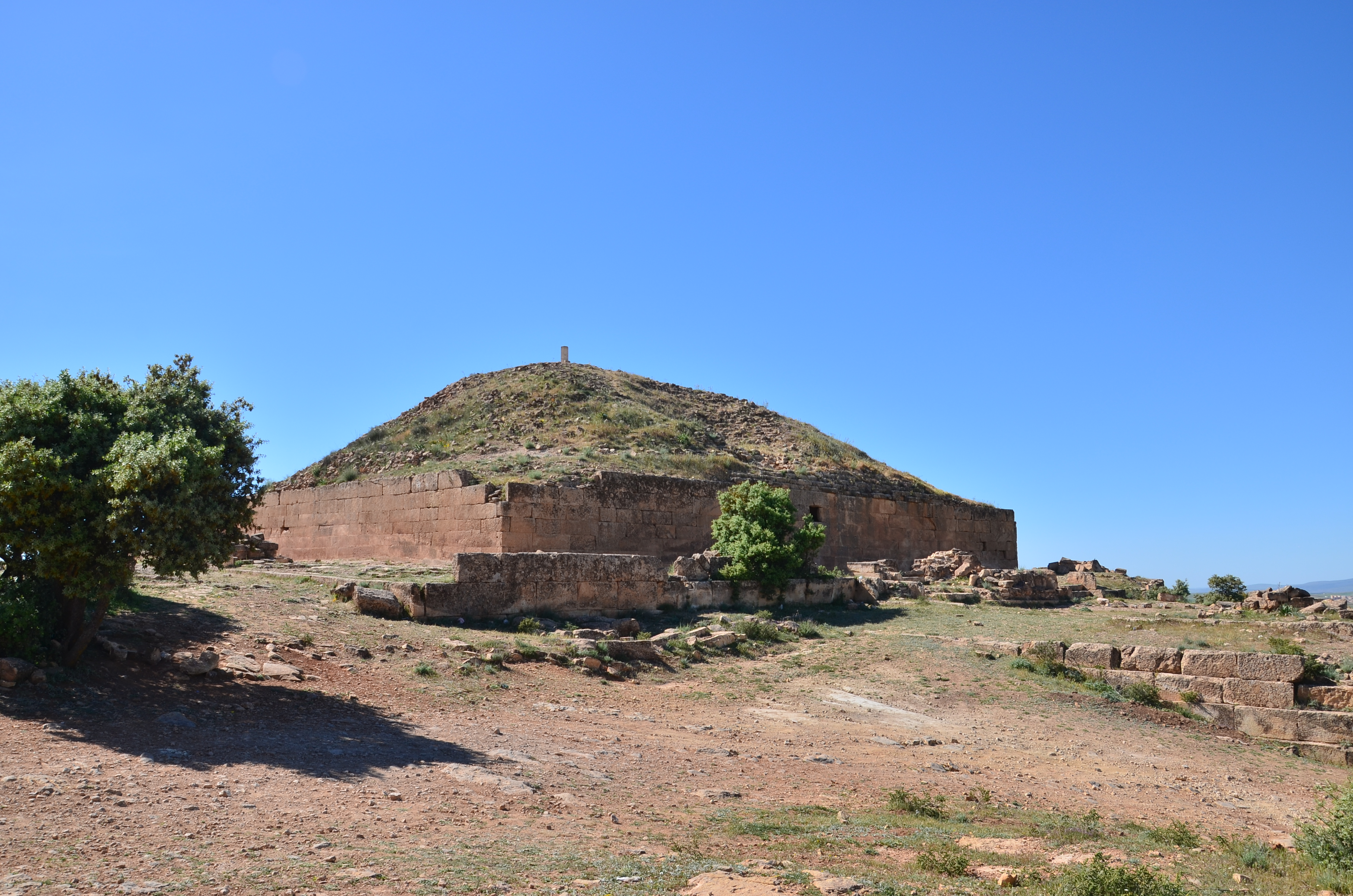
Frenda Jedars (Frenda)

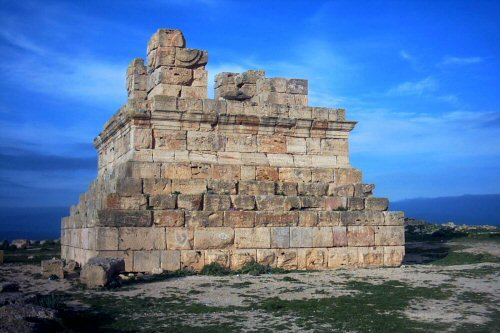
The tomb of Massinissa (El Khroub)

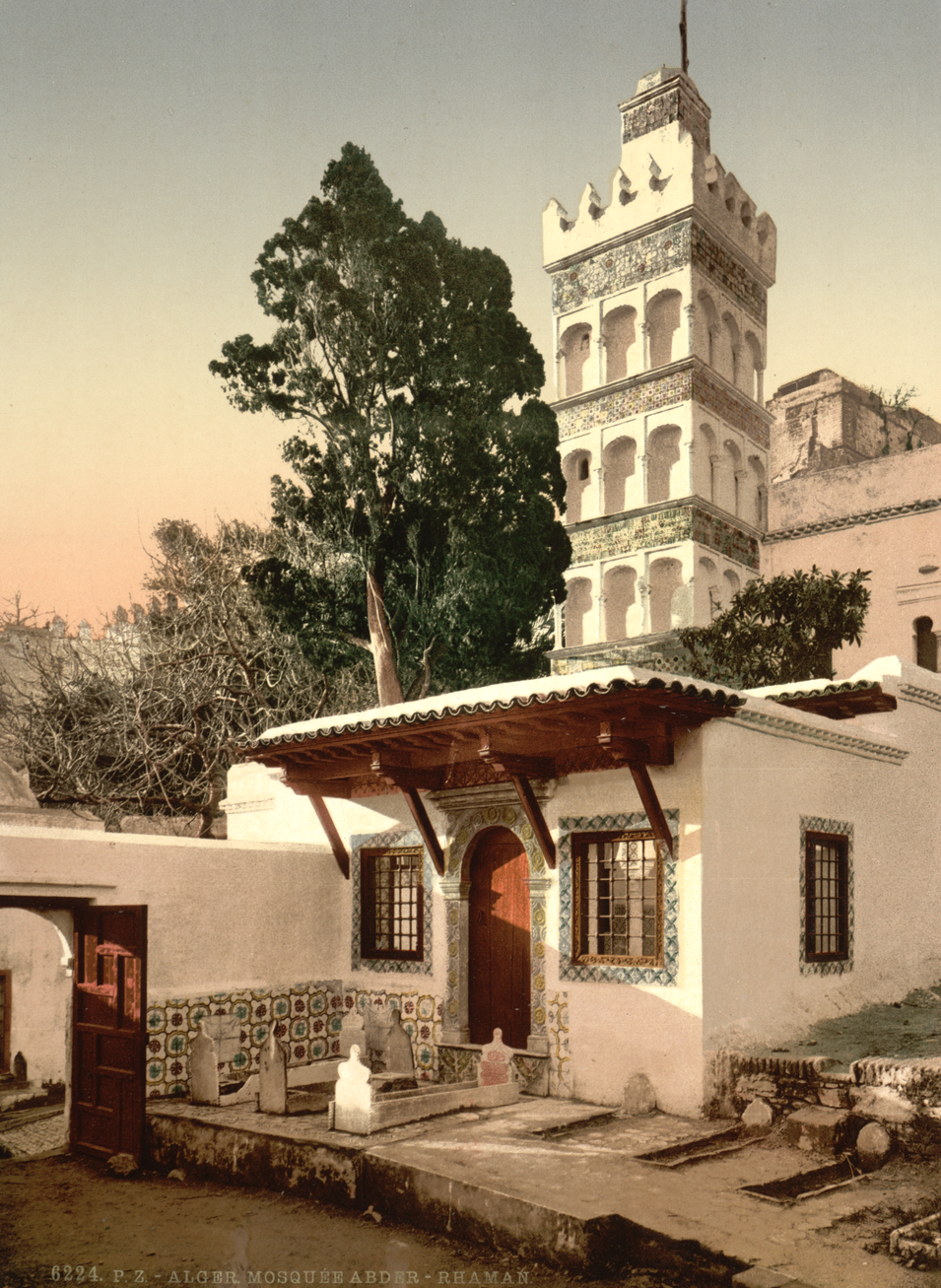
Mausoleum of Sidi Abderrahmane Et-Thaalibi (Algiers)

==== Egypt ====
- Al-Hussein Mosque is a shrine and mausoleum in Cairo, Egypt, and the purported burial place of Muhammad's grandson, Husayn ibn Ali
- Al-Rifa'i Mosque is a shrine and mausoleum in Cairo, Egypt, and the burial place of the Royal Family of Egypt and Iran.
- Gamal Abdel Nasser Mosque is a shrine and mausoleum in Cairo, Egypt, and the burial place of Gamal Abdel Nasser, second president of Egypt.
- Mastabas dating from ancient Egypt
- Mausoleum of Saad Zaghloul in Downtown Cairo, Egypt
- Qalawun complex, contains the mausoleum of Qalawun in Cairo, Egypt
- The Unknown Soldier Memorial is a pyramid-shaped monument in Nasr City, Egypt
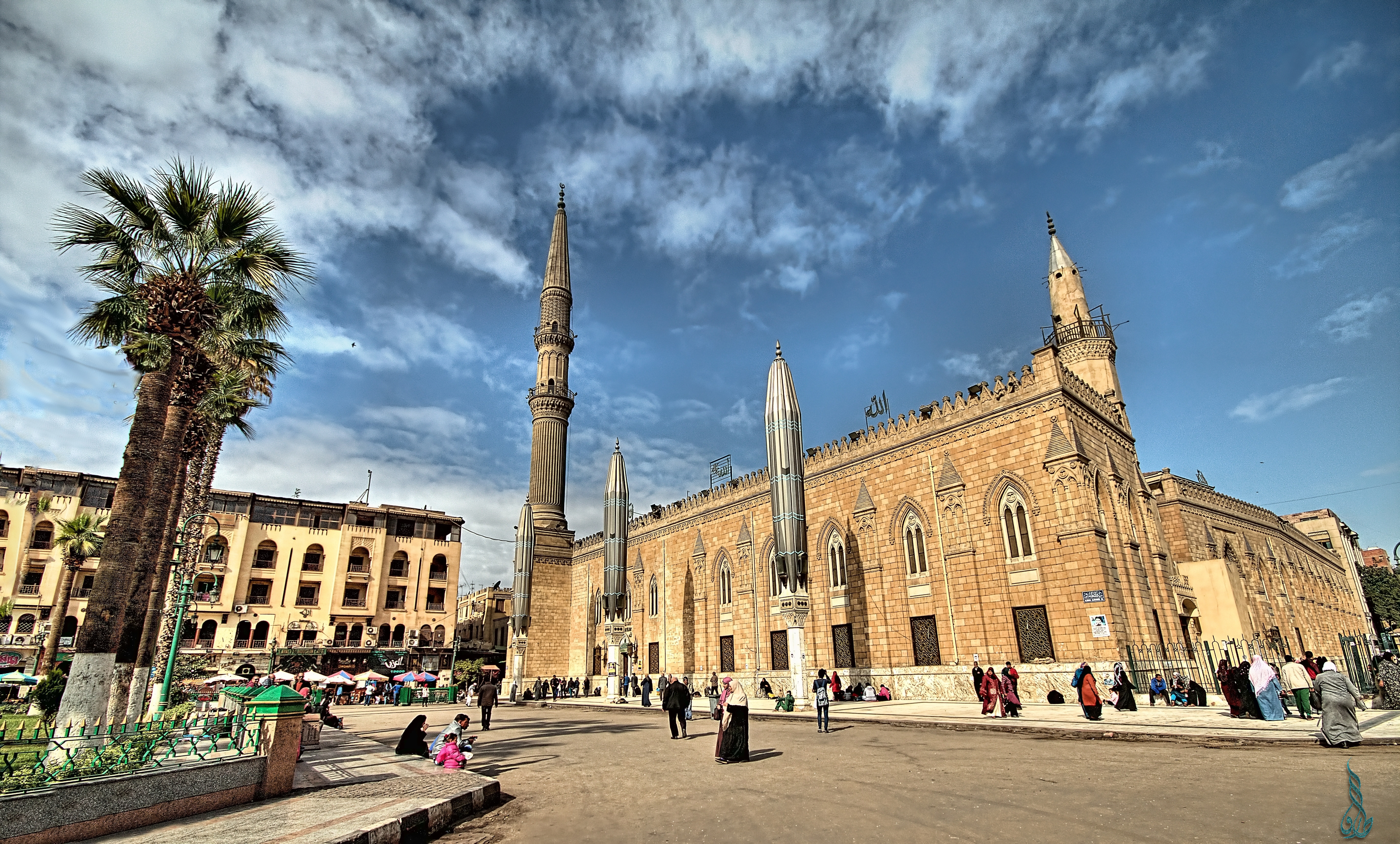
Al-Hussein Mosque in Cairo, Egypt

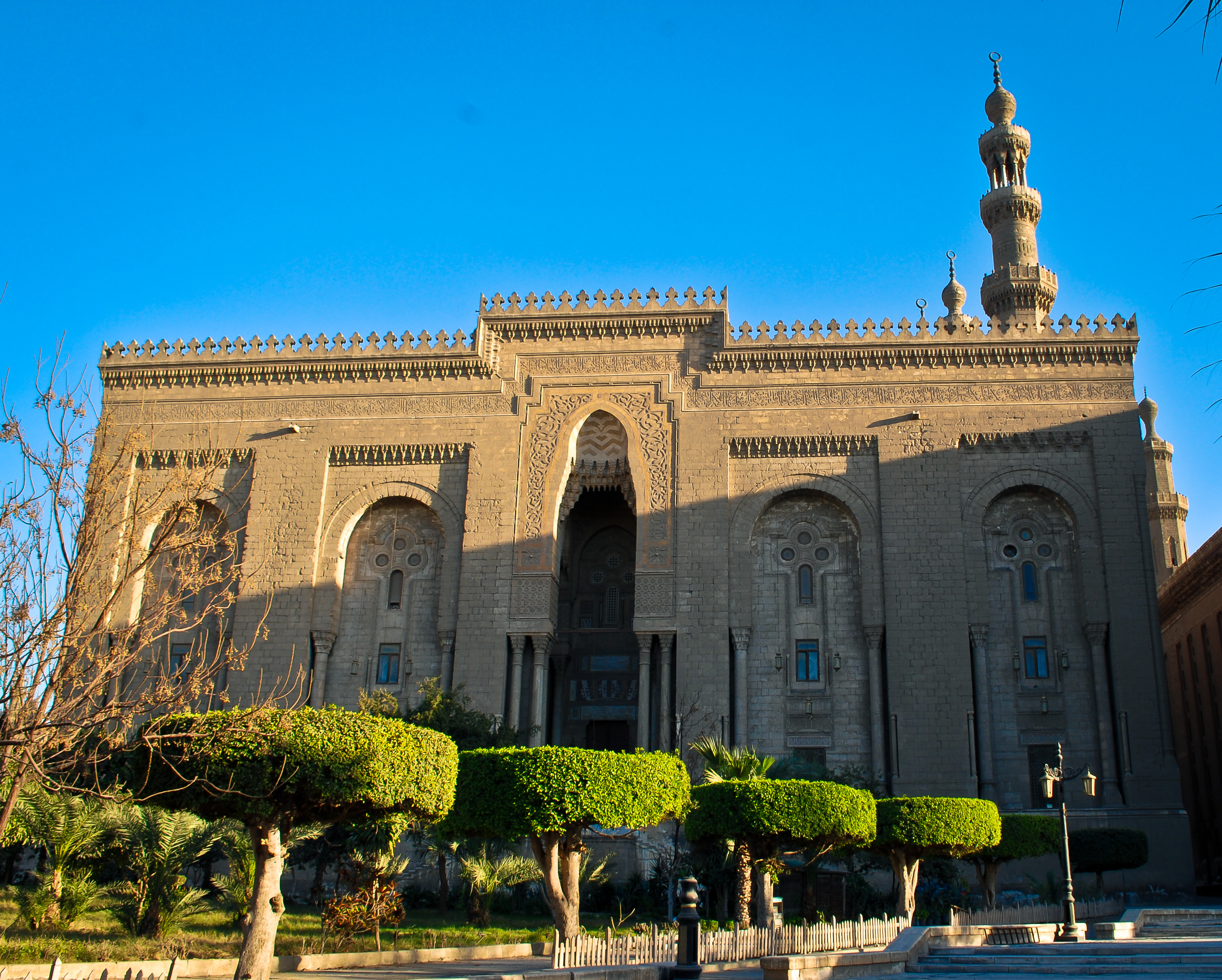
Al-Rifa'i Mosque in Cairo, Egypt

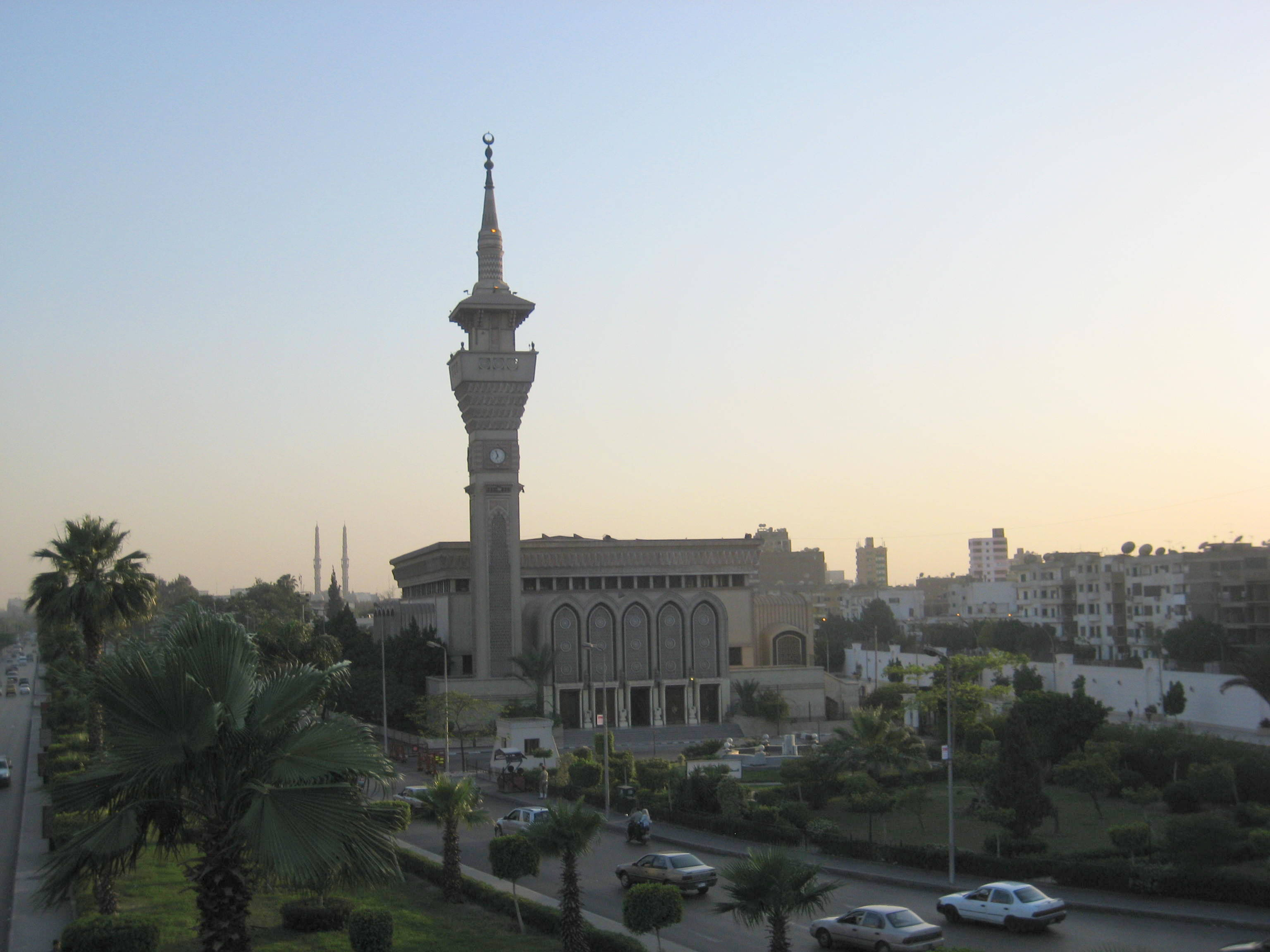
Gamal Abdel Nasser Mosque in Cairo, Egypt

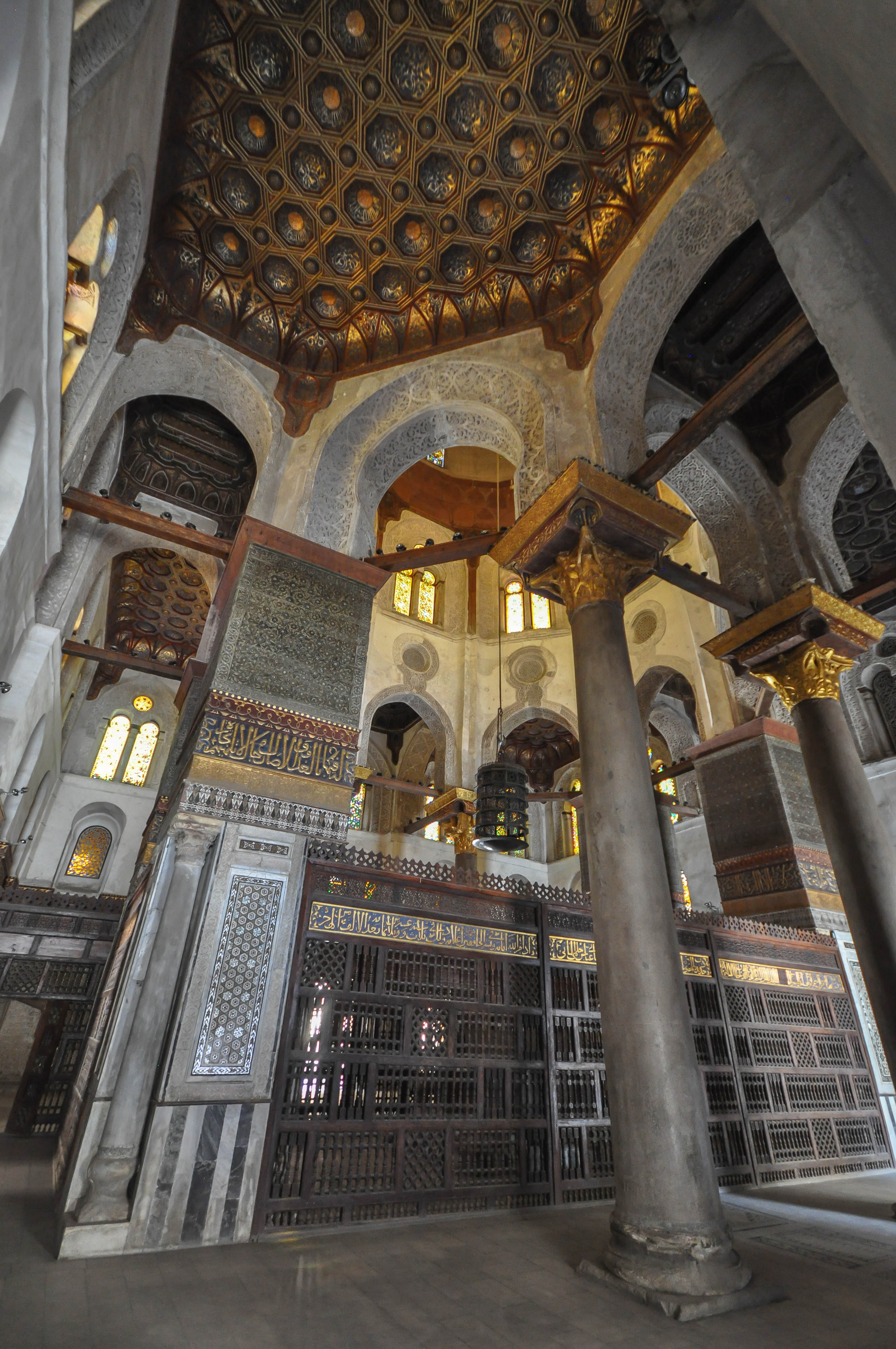
Qalawun complex in Cairo, Egypt

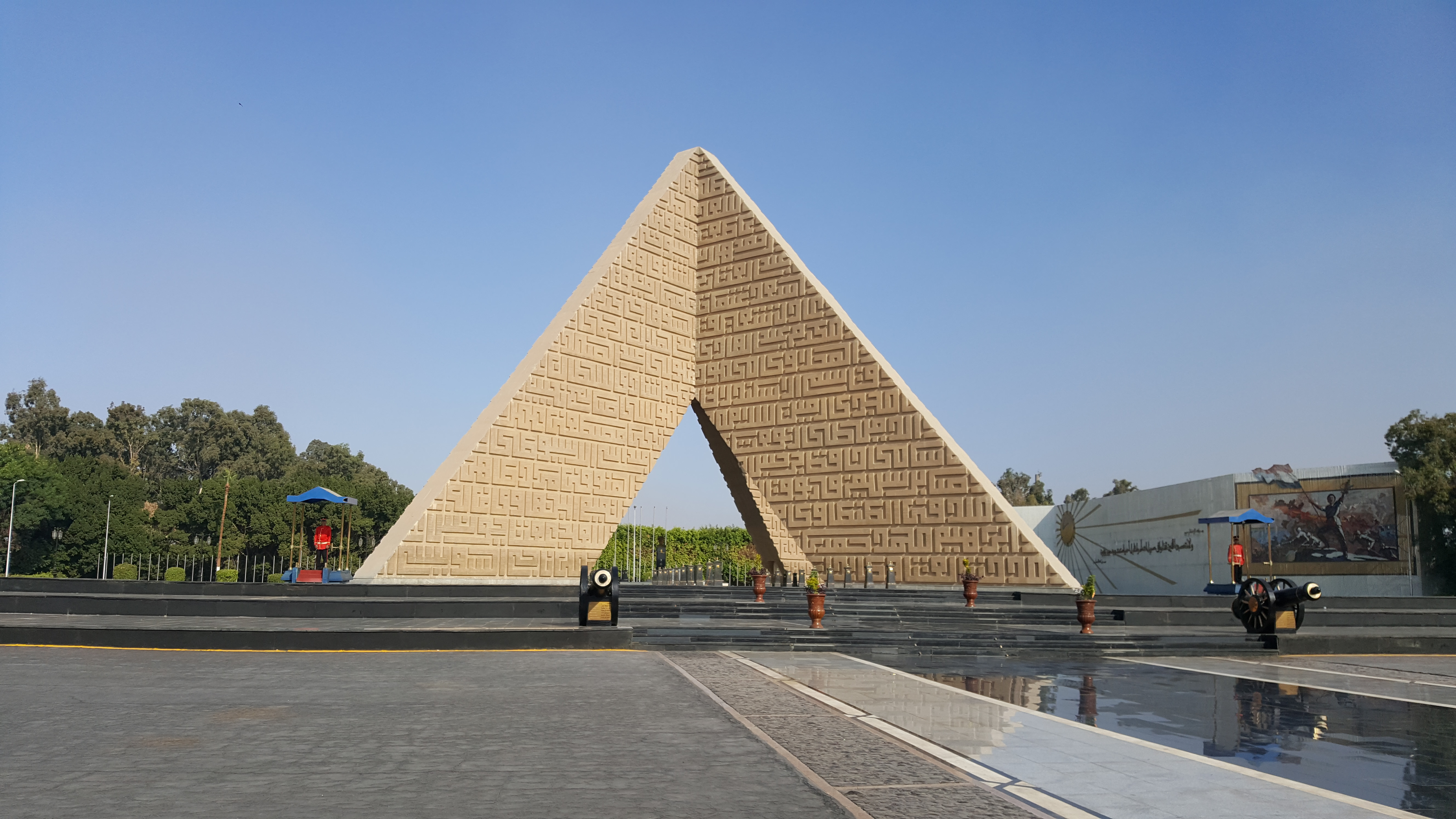
Unknown Soldier Memorial in Cairo, Egypt

==== Morocco ====
- Cheikh Al Kamel Mausoleum, monumental grave of Mohammed al-Hadi ben Issa the founder of Isawiyya in Meknes, Morocco.
- Mausoleum of Mohammed V, monumental grave of King Mohammed V and his sons (King Hassan II and Prince Abdallah) in Rabat, Morocco.
- Mausoleum of Moulay Ismail, monumental grave of Sultan Moulay Ismail in Meknes, Morocco.
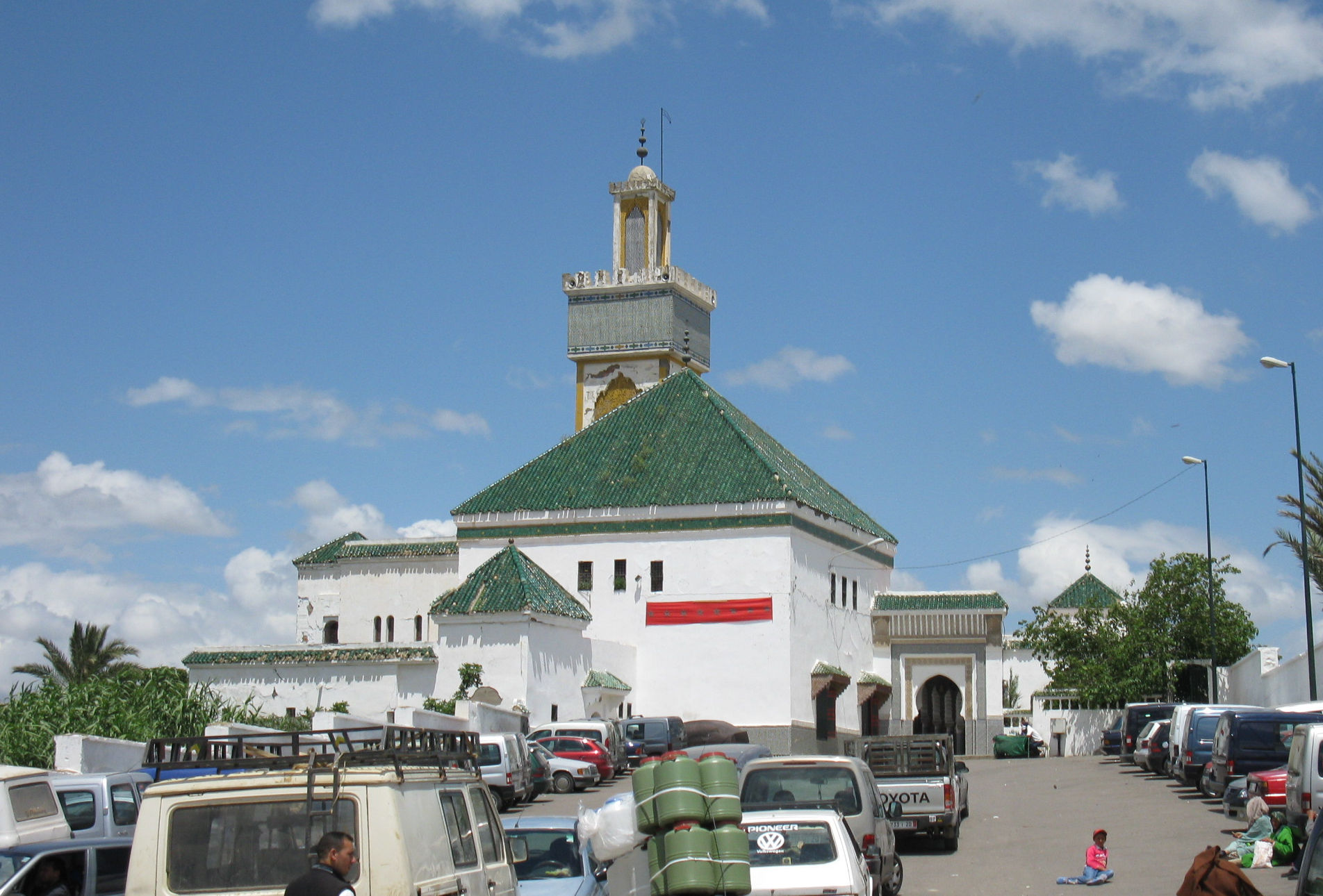
Cheikh Al Kamel Mausoleum in Meknes, Morocco

Mausoleum of Mohammed V in Rabat, Morocco

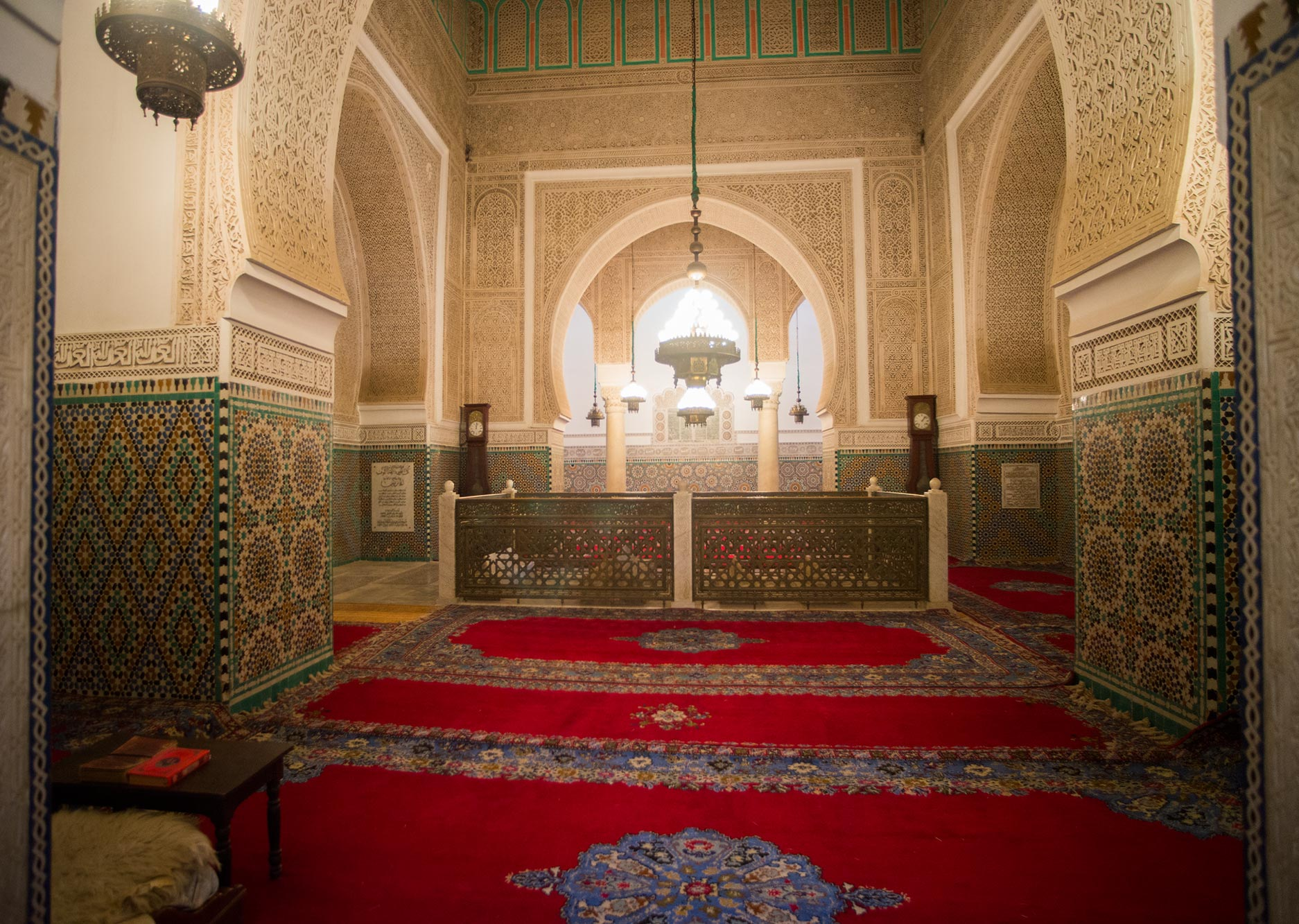
Mausoleum of Moulay Ismail in Meknes, Morocco

==== Tunisia ====
- Bourguiba mausoleum, monumental grave of Habib Bourguiba, first president of Tunisia, in Monastir, Tunisia
- Libyco-Punic Mausoleum of Dougga, ancient mausoleum in Dougga, Tunisia.
- Mausoleum of Lalla Mennana, in Tunis, Tunisia.
- Sidi Belhassen Chedly Mausoleum, monumental grave of Belhassen Chedly, near the Jellaz cemetery in Tunis.
- Tourbet el Bey, monumental grave of the former Tunisian Royal Family, in the Medina of Tunis, Tunisia
- Tourbet Aziza Othmana, monumental grave of Aziza Othmana, a Tunisian princess of the Muradid dynasty in the Medina of Tunis, Tunisia
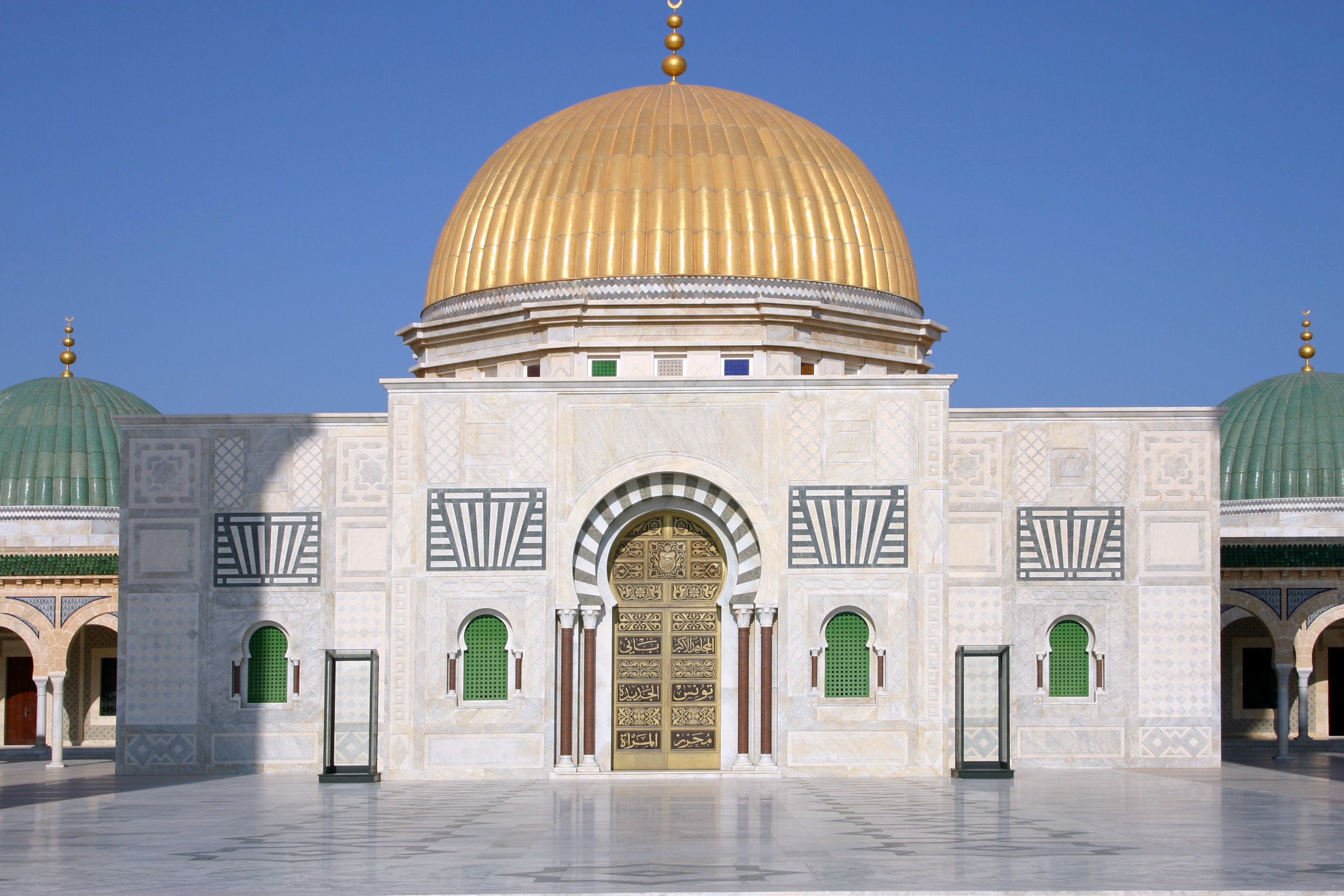
Habib Bourguiba's mausoleum in Monastir, Tunisia

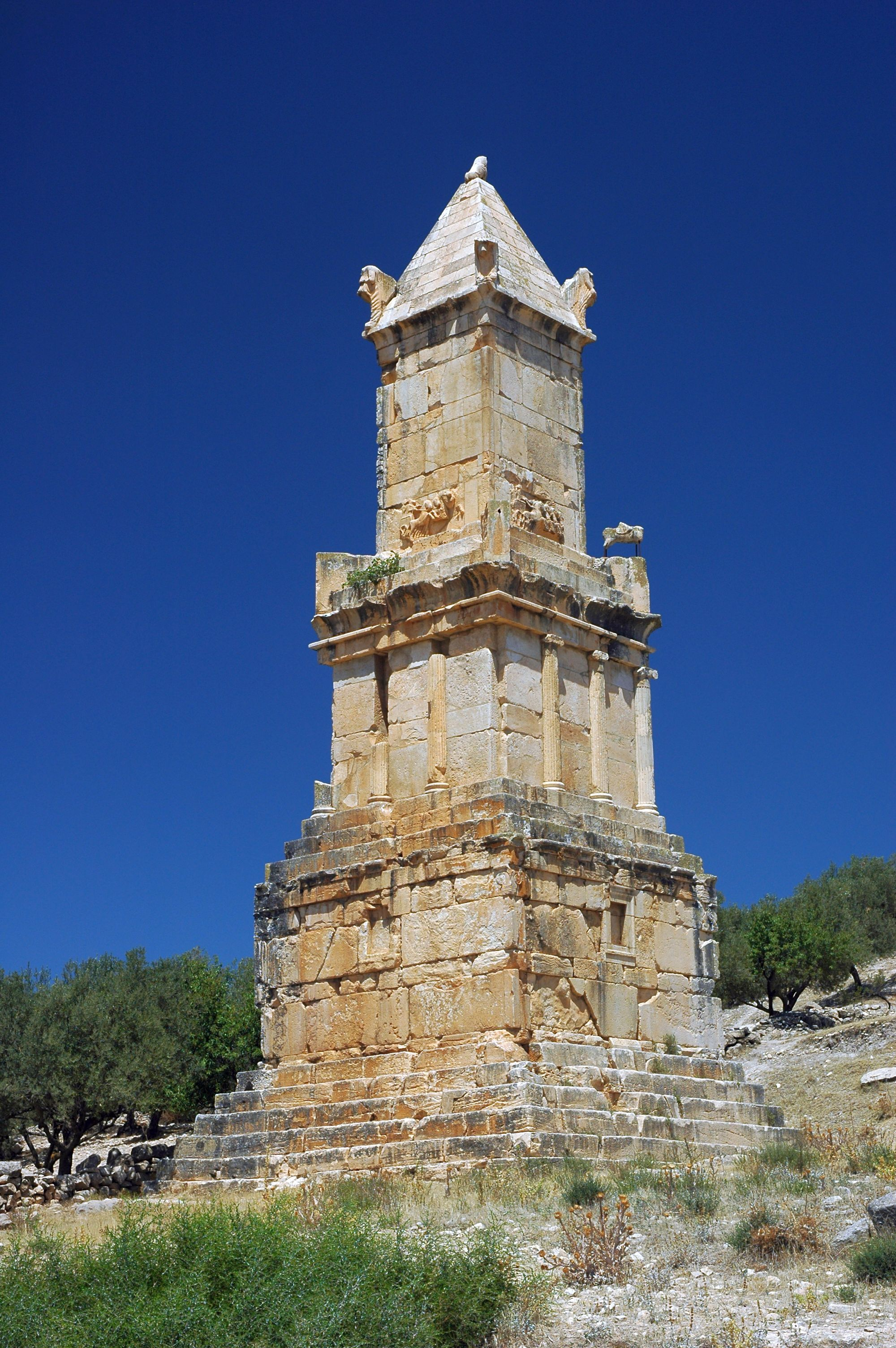
Libyco-Punic Mausoleum in Dougga, Tunisia

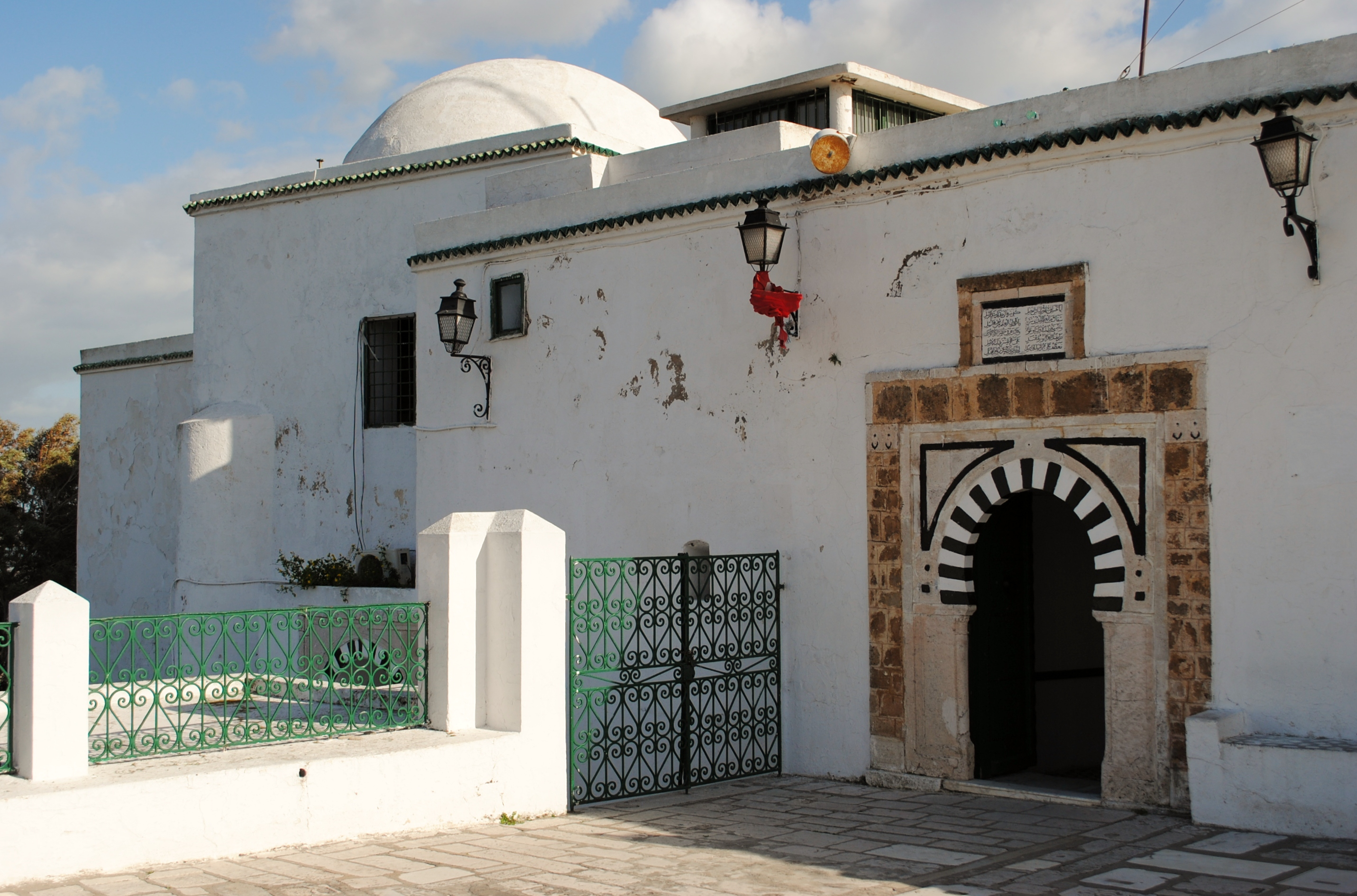
Sidi Belhassen Chedly Mausoleum in Tunis, Tunisia

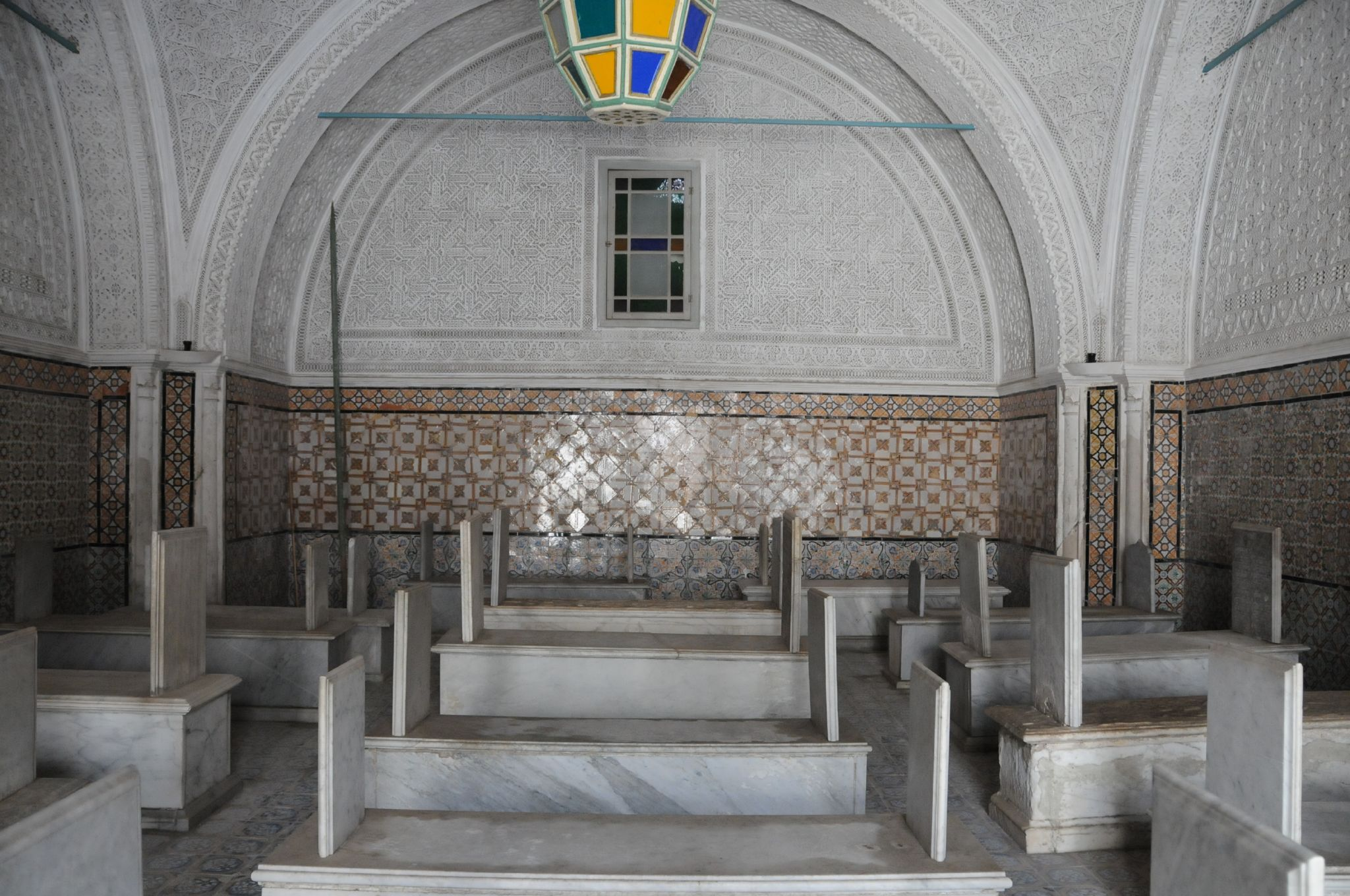
Tourbet el Bey in the Medina of Tunis

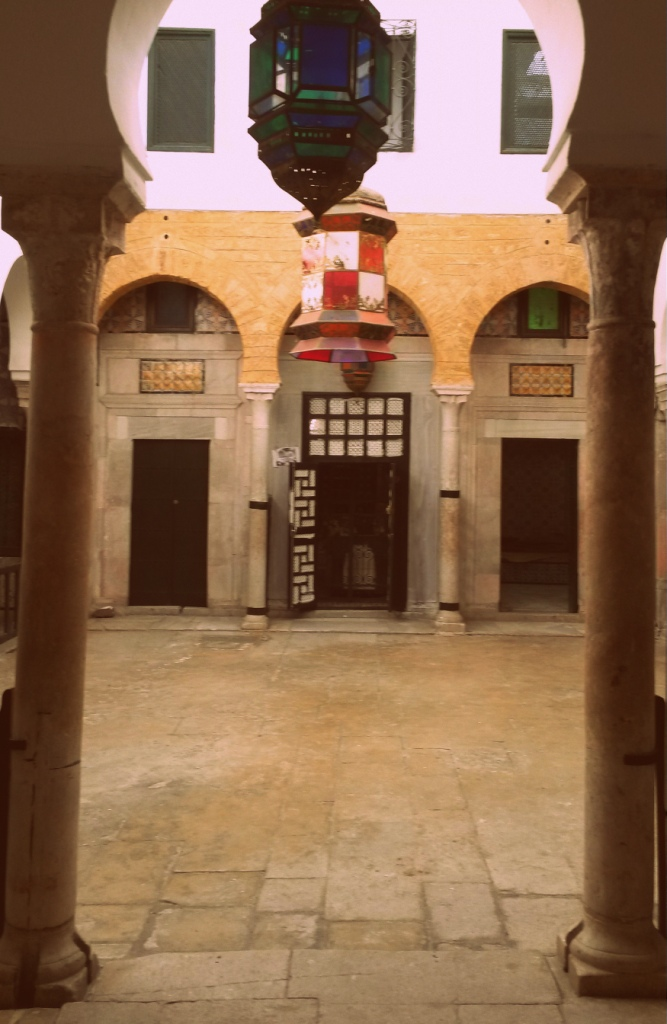
Tourbet Aziza Othmana in the Medina of Tunis

==== Southern Africa ====
- Agostinho Neto's mausoleum in Luanda, Angola
- King Sobhuza II Memorial Park in Lobamba, Eswatini
- Kamuzu Banda's mausoleum in Lilongwe, Malawi
- Bingu wa Mutharika, third president of Malawi, built a mausoleum in which his late first wife and Bingu himself are buried.
- The Heroes Square in Maputo, Mozambique
- Heroes' Acre in Windhoek, Namibia
- Mausoleum of Levy Mwanawasa, Frederick Chiluba, and Michael Sata at the Embassy Park Presidential Burial Site in Lusaka, Zambia
- National Heroes' Acre in Harare, Zimbabwe

==== East Africa ====
- Domoni, Comoros, burial place and location of Ahmed Abdallah's mausoleum, first president of Comoros
- Meles Zenawi's grave in the Holy Trinity Cathedral, Addis Ababa, Ethiopia
- Mausoleum of Mzee Jomo Kenyatta, late president of Kenya, in Nairobi, Kenya
- Jaramogi Oginga Odinga's mausoleum in Bondo, Kenya
- Raila Amolo Odinga's mausoleum in Bondo, Kenya
- Tom Mboya Mausoleum, Rusinga Island, Homa Bay County, Kenya
- Julius Nyerere's mausoleum in Mwalimu Nyerere Museum Centre, Butiama, Tanzania

==== Others ====
- Mausoleum of Hubert Maga in Parakou, Benin
- Mathieu Kerekou's mausoleum in Natitingou, Benin
- Mausolée du Guide Suprême du Patriotisme in Gitega, Burundi
- Fulbert Youlou's mausoleum in Madibou, Marien Ngouabi's mausoleum and Pierre Savorgnan de Brazza's mausoleum in Brazzaville, Republic of Congo
- Laurent Kabila's mausoleum in Kinshasa, Democratic Republic of Congo
- Mausoleum of Joseph Kasa-Vubu in Singini, Tshela, Kongo Central, Democratic Republic of Congo
- Omar Bongo's mausoleum, a replica of the mausoleum of Mohammed V, in Franceville, Gabon
- Léon M'ba's mausoleum in Libreville, Gabon
- Kwame Nkrumah Mausoleum in Accra, Ghana
- Atta Mills's mausoleum at Asomdwee Park in Accra, Ghana
- Burma Camp military cemetery in Accra, Ghana
- Camayanne Mausoleum, monumental grave of Guinea's national heroes Samori Ture, Sekou Toure, and Alfa Yaya in the Grand Mosque of Conakry
- Amilcar Cabral's mausoleum in Bissau, Guinea-Bissau.
- Mausoleum of Félix Houphouët-Boigny, first president of Ivory Coast, in Yamoussoukro, Ivory Coast
- Palm Grove Cemetery in Monrovia, Liberia
- National Hall, mausoleum of the late president William Tubman in Monrovia, Montserrado, Liberia
- Nnamdi Azikiwe's mausoleum in Onitsha, Nigeria
- Tafawa Balewa's tomb in Bauchi, Nigeria
- Mausoleum of Obafemi Awolowo in Ogun State, Nigeria
- Sani Abacha's mausoleum in Kano, Nigeria
- John Garang De Mabior's mausoleum in Juba, South Sudan
- Eyadema's family mausoleum in Kara, Togo

==== Gallery of African mausoleums ====
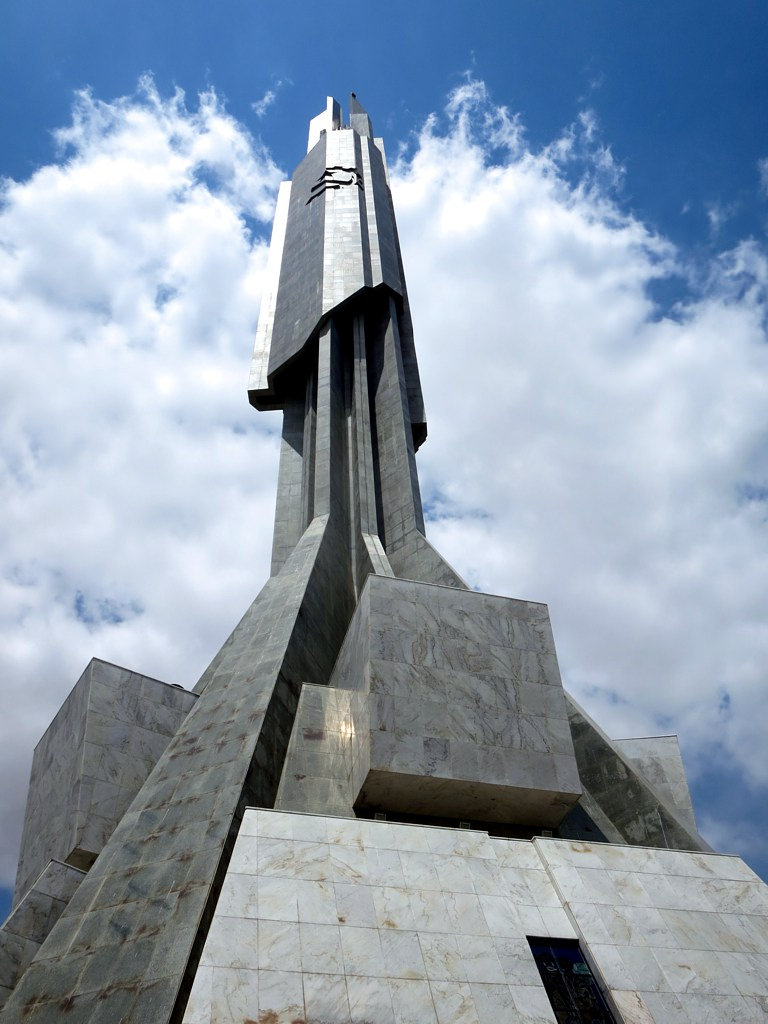
Agostinho Neto's Mausoleum in Luanda, Angola

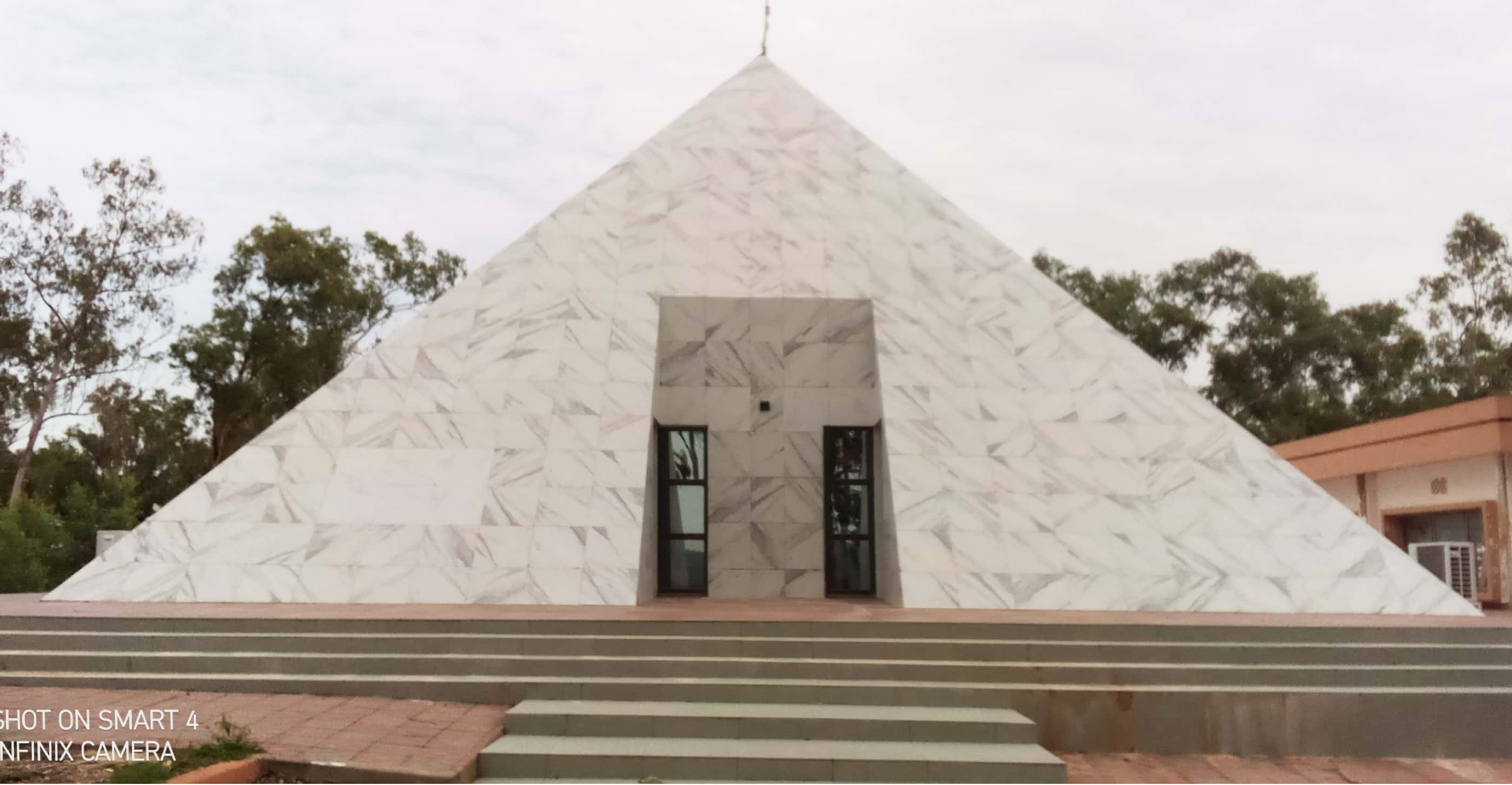
Mathieu Kerekou's mausoleum in Natitingou, Benin

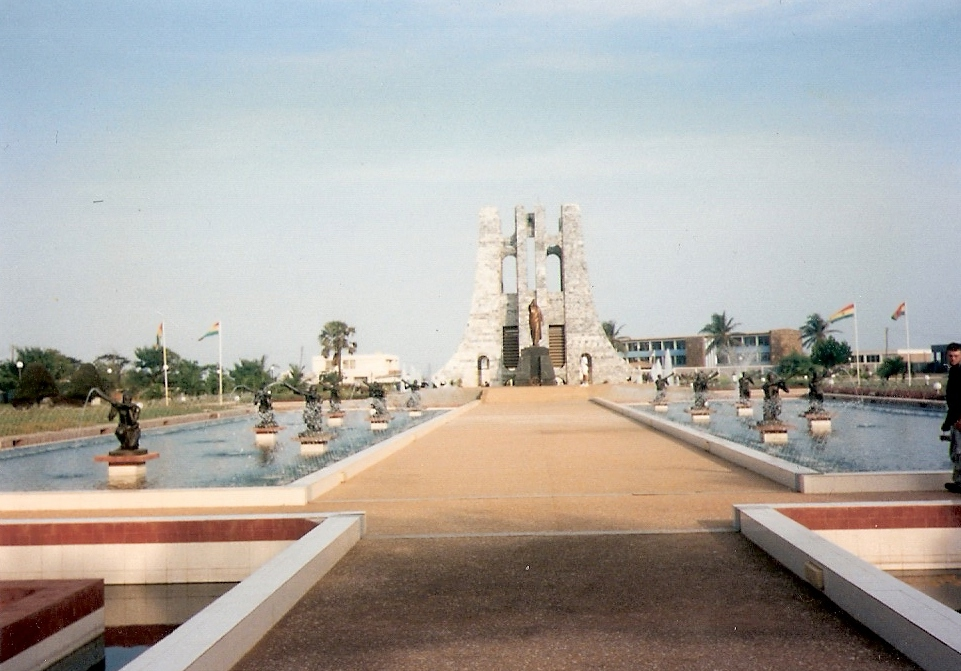
Kwame Nkrumah Memorial Park and Mausoleum in Accra, Ghana

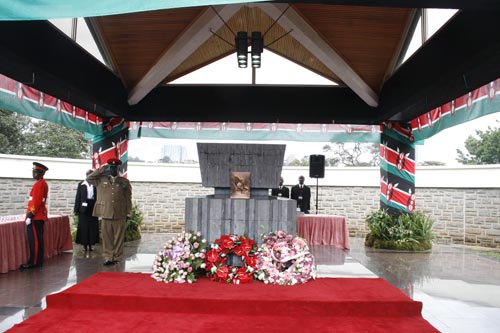
Mausoleum of the late President of Kenya Mzee Jomo Kenyatta in Nairobi, Kenya

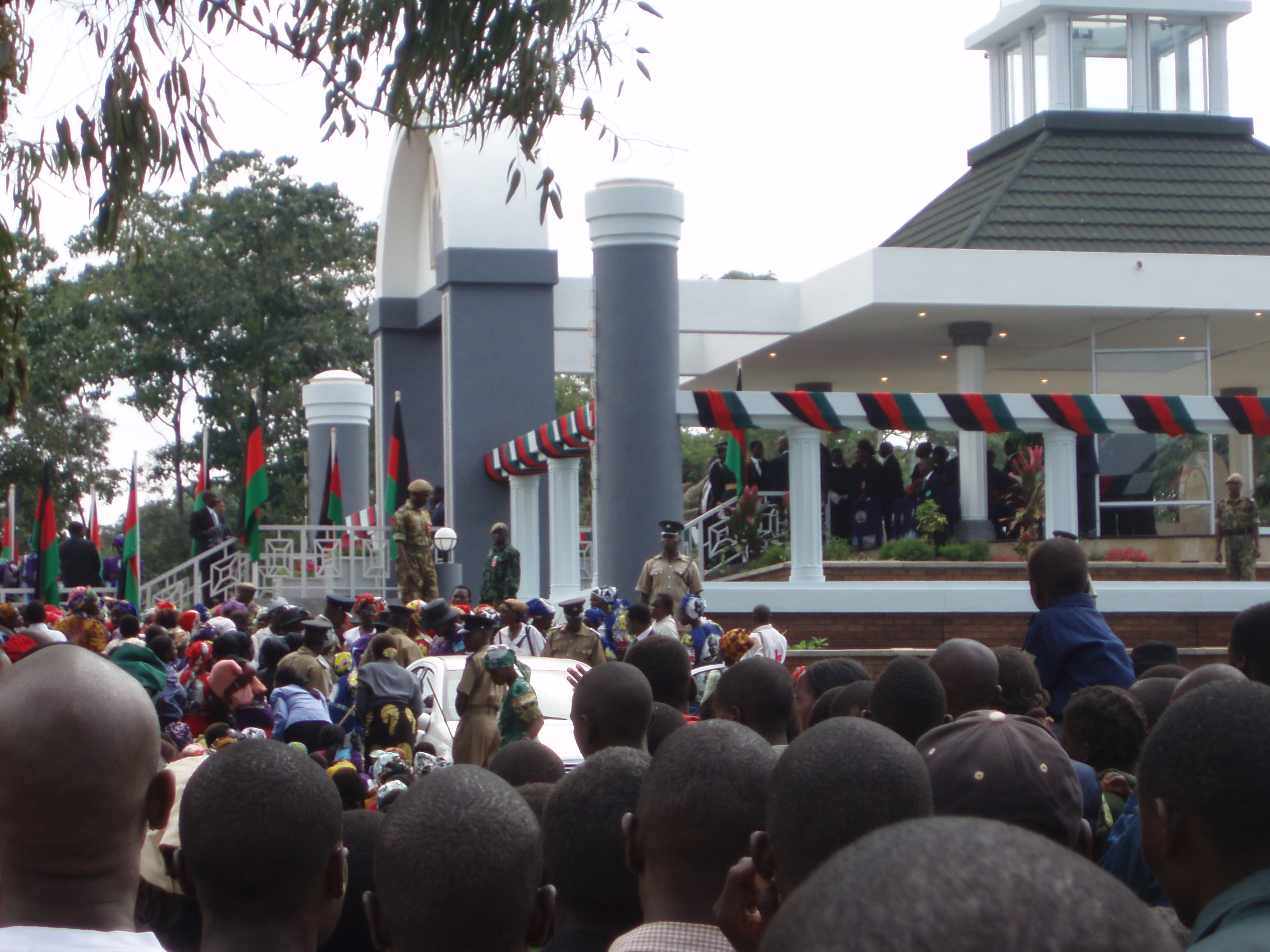
Kamuzu Banda Mausoleum in Lilongwe, Malawi

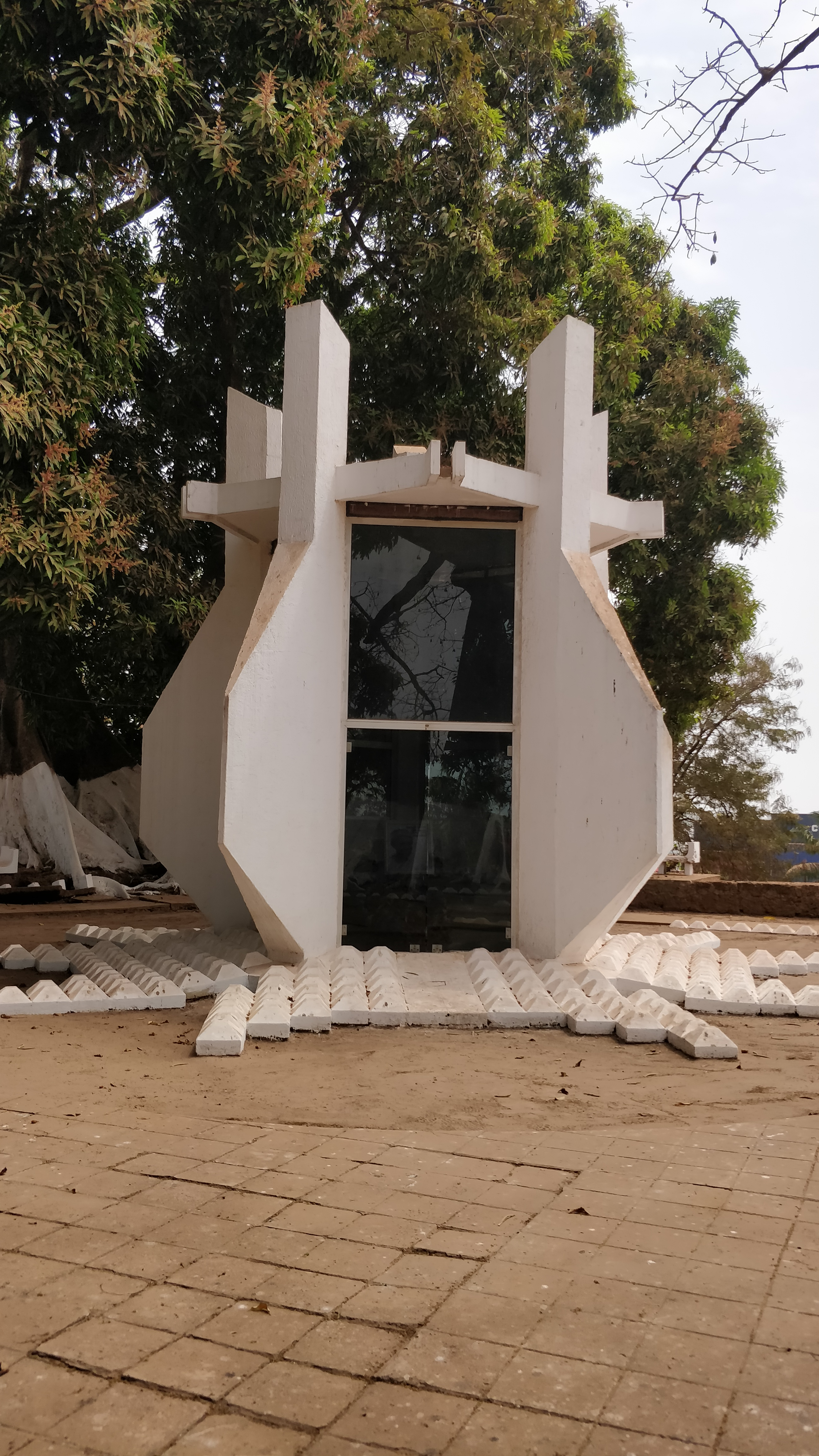
Amilcar Cabral's mausoleum in Bissau, Guinea-Bissau

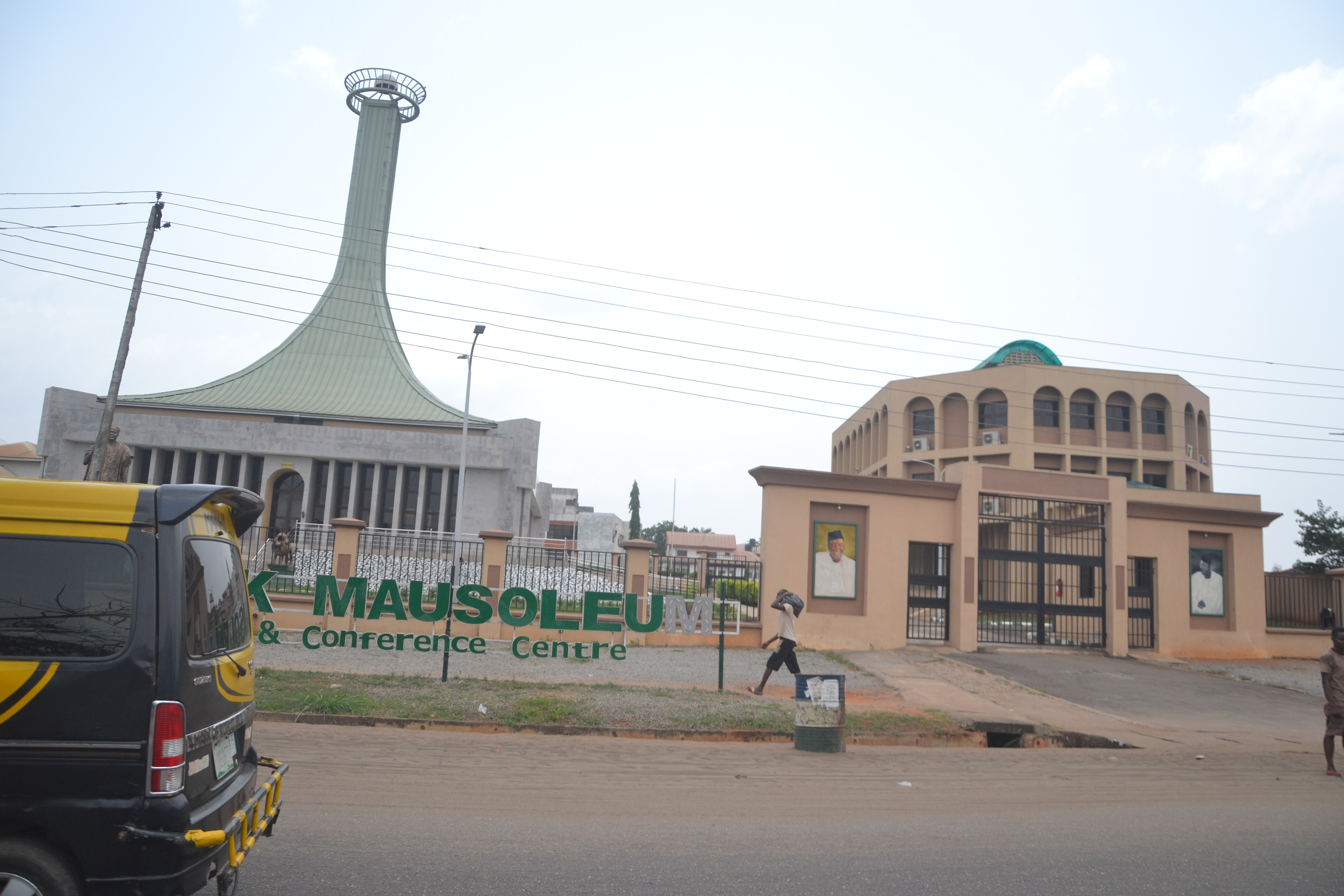
Nnamdi Azikiwe's burial site, Onitsha, Nigeria.

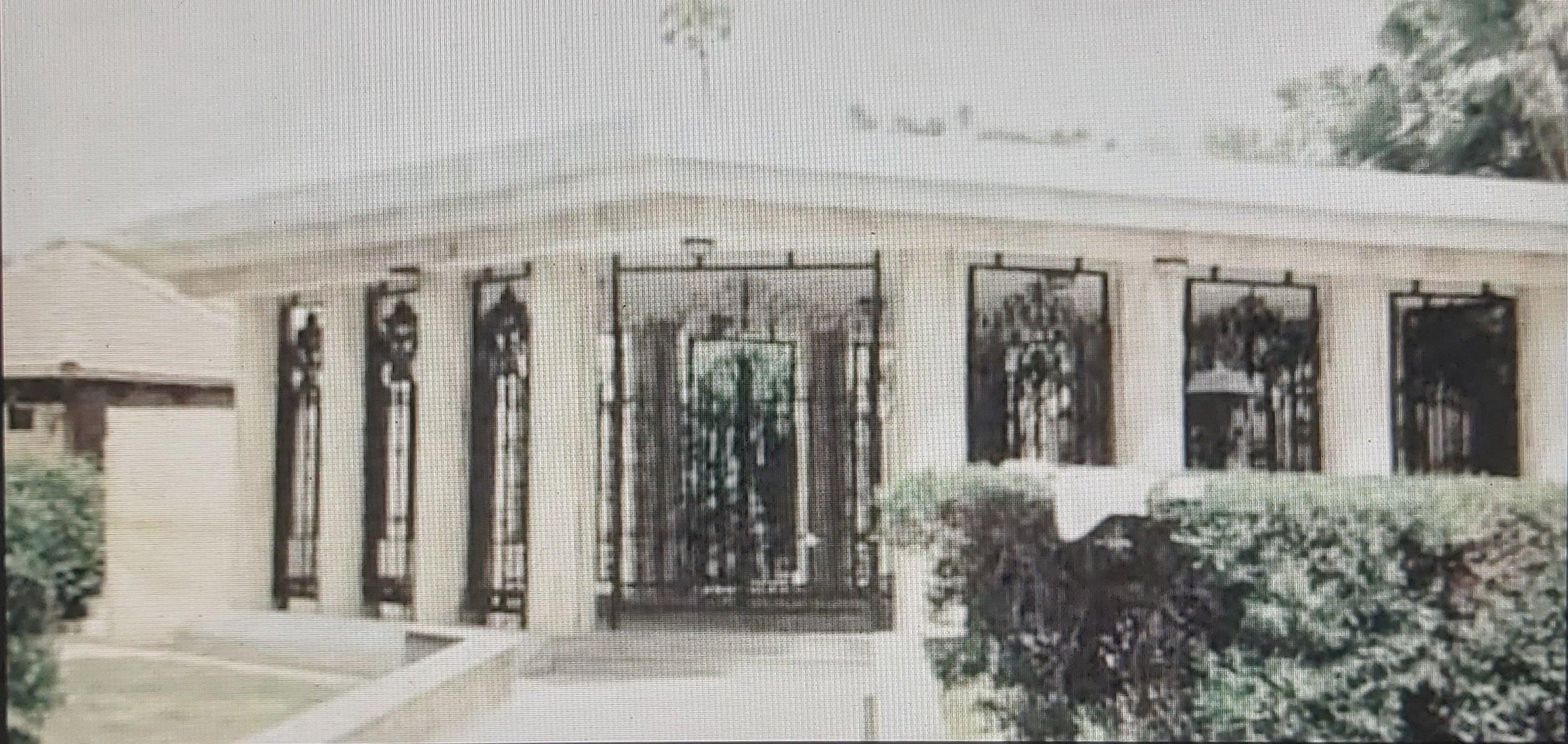
Sani Abacha's mausoleum in Kano, Nigeria.

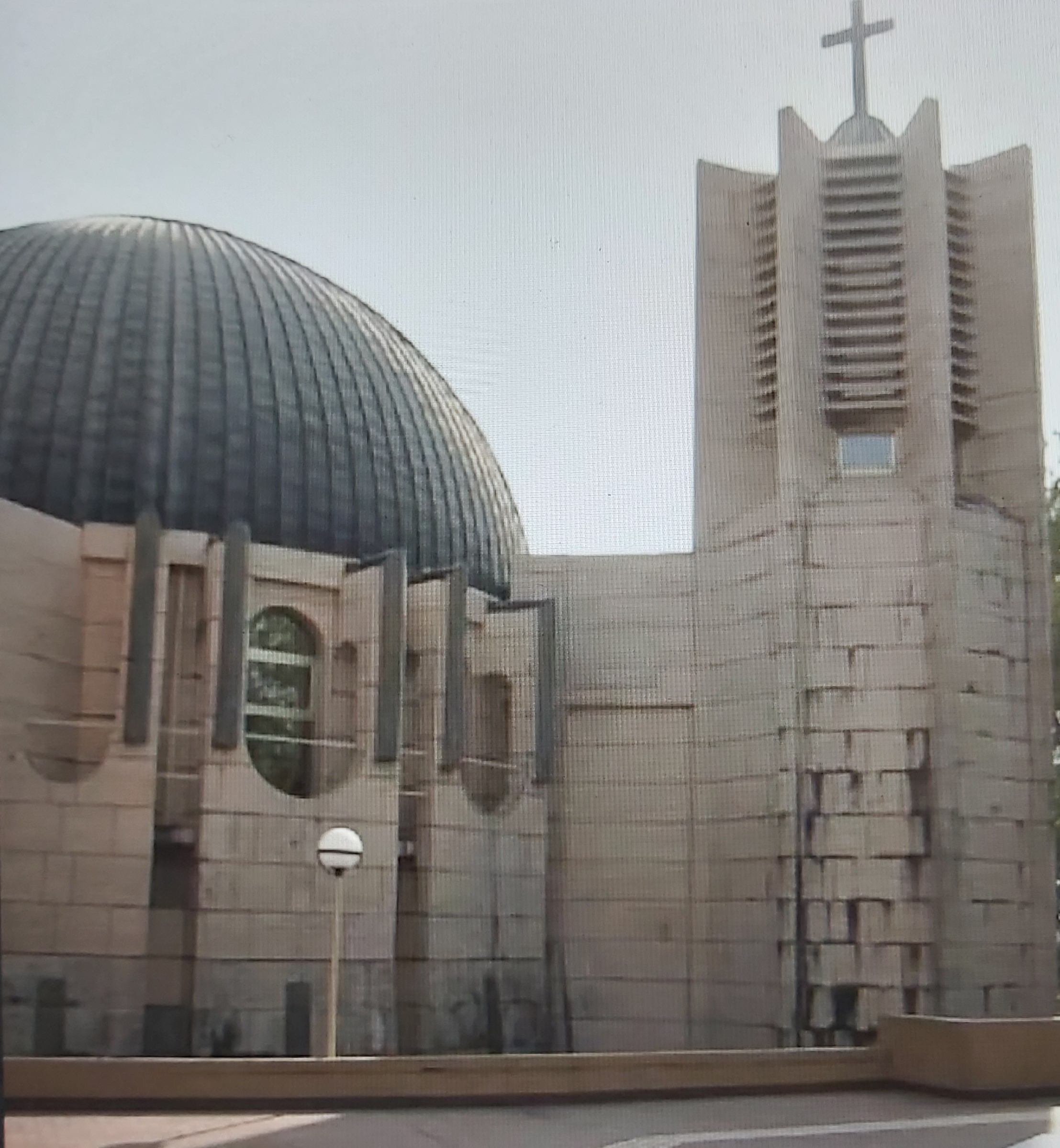
Eyadema's family mausoleum in Kara, Togo.

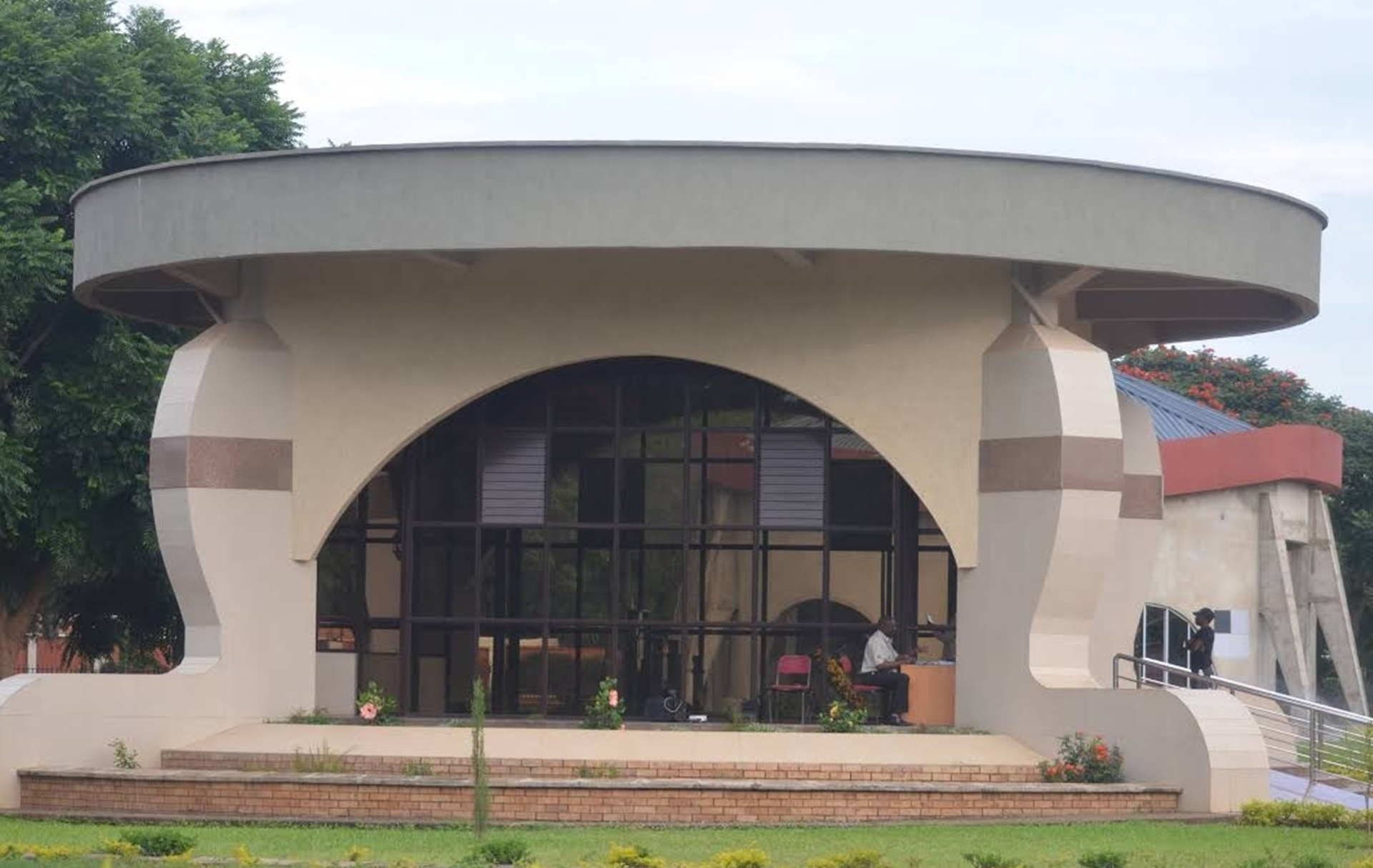
Mausoleum of late President Levy Mwanawasa at Embassy Park Presidential Burial in Lusaka, Zambia.

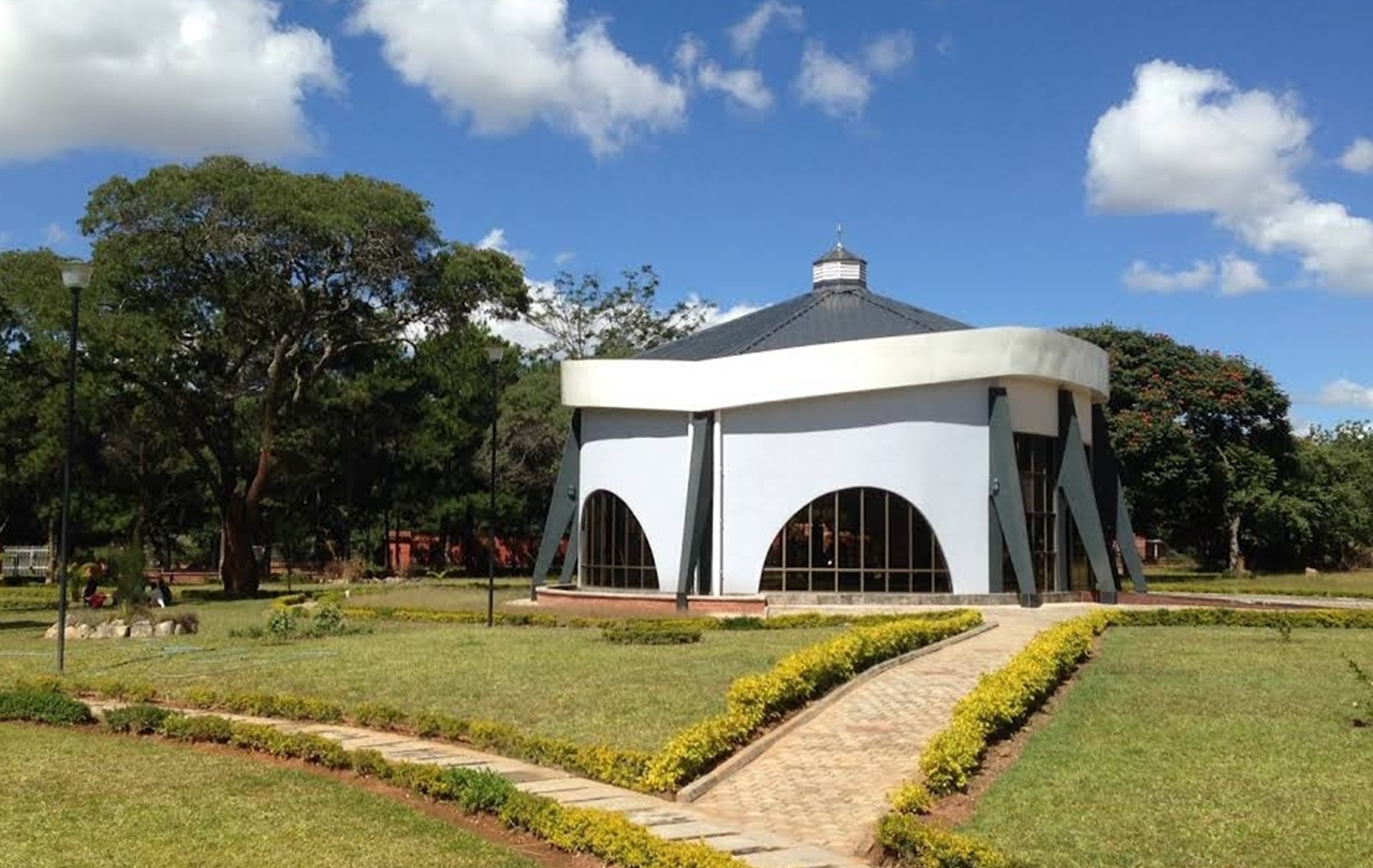
Mausoleum of late President Frederick Chiluba at Embassy Park Presidential Burial in Lusaka, Zambia.

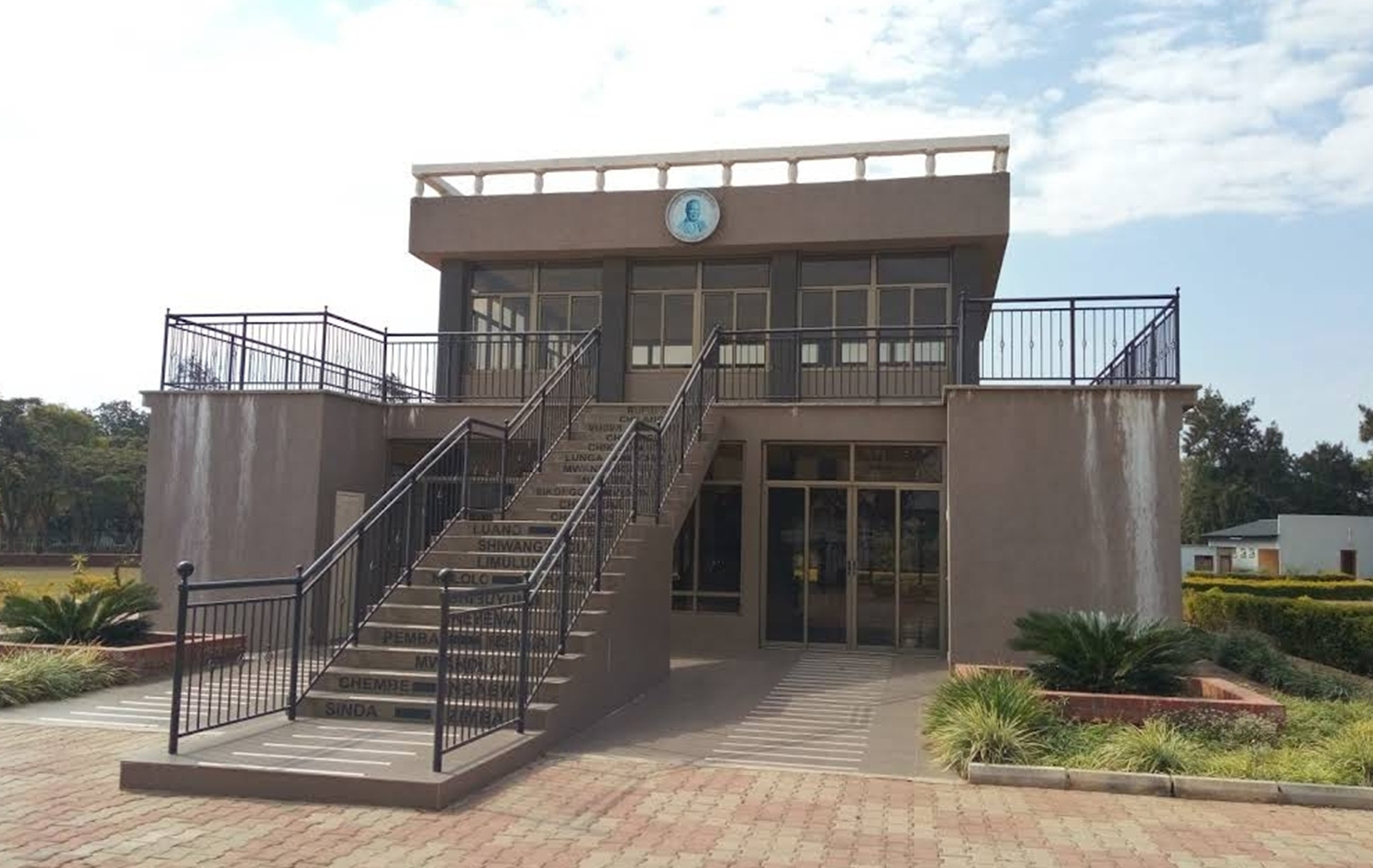
Mausoleum of late President Michael Sata at Embassy Park Presidential Burial in Lusaka, Zambia.

=== Asia, Eastern, Southern, Central, and Southeast ===
==== Afghanistan ====
- Tomb of Ahmad Shah Durrani in Kandahar, Afghanistan
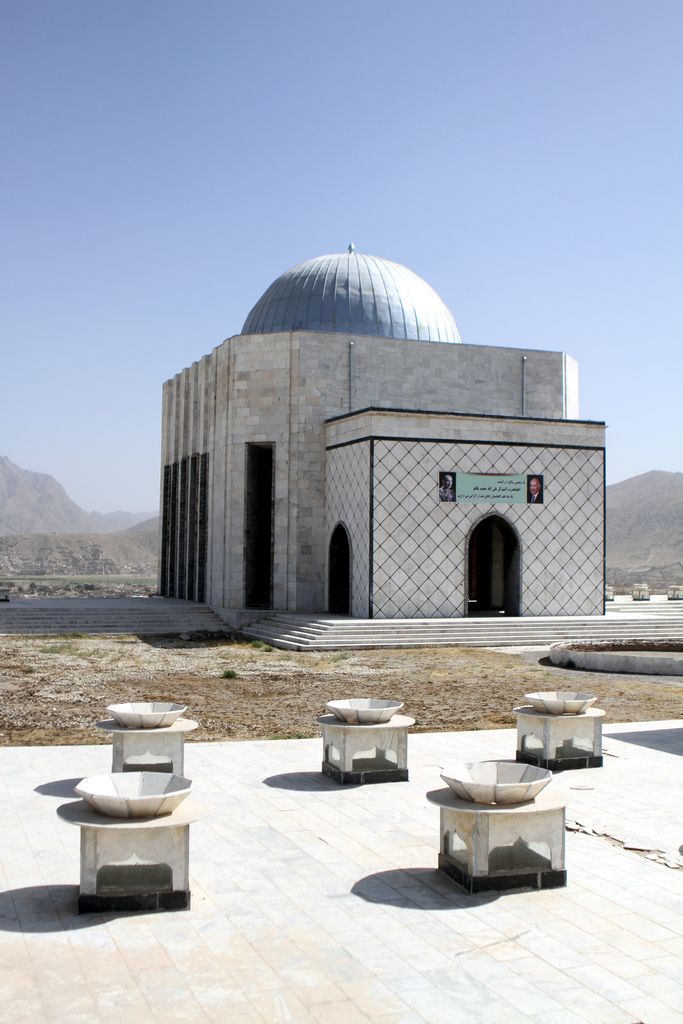
Mausoleum of Mohammad Zaher Shah (Hill of Teppe Maranjan) in Kabul

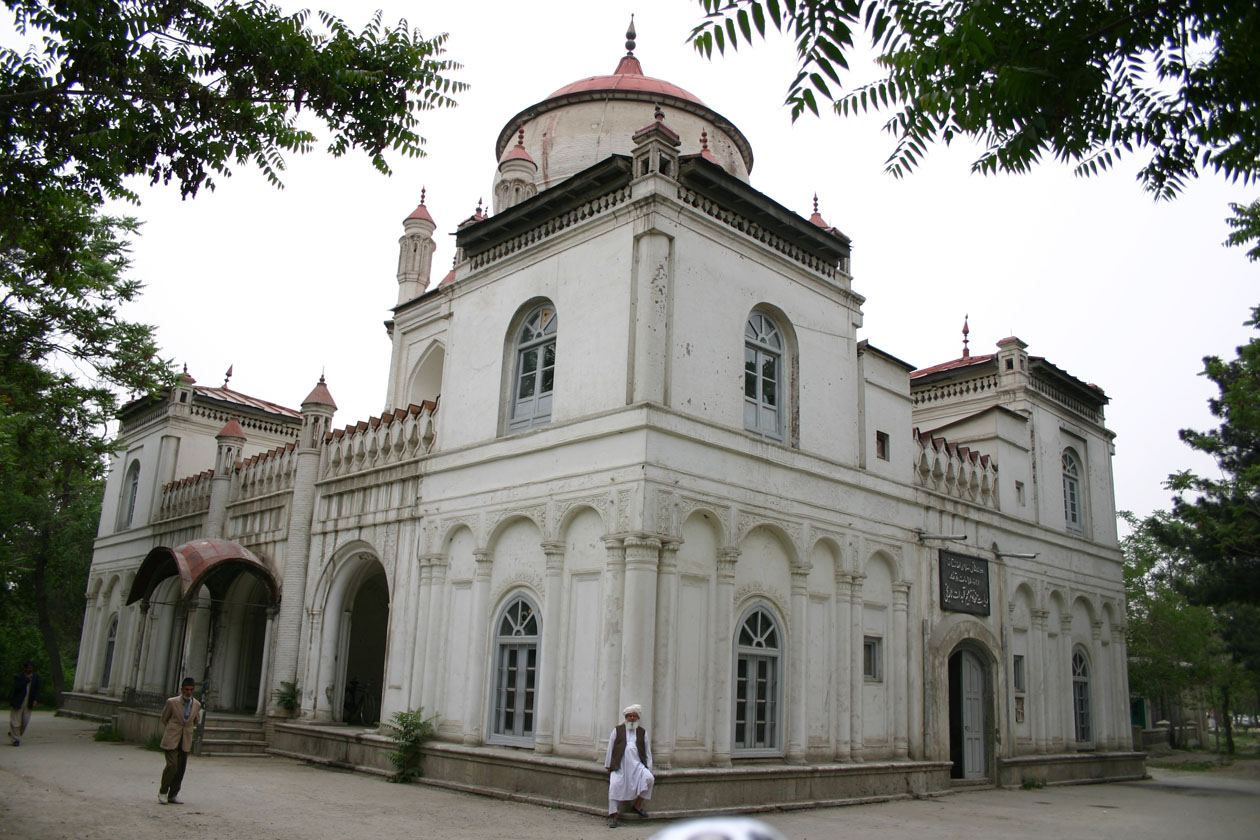
Abdur Rahman Khan's Mausoleum in Kabul

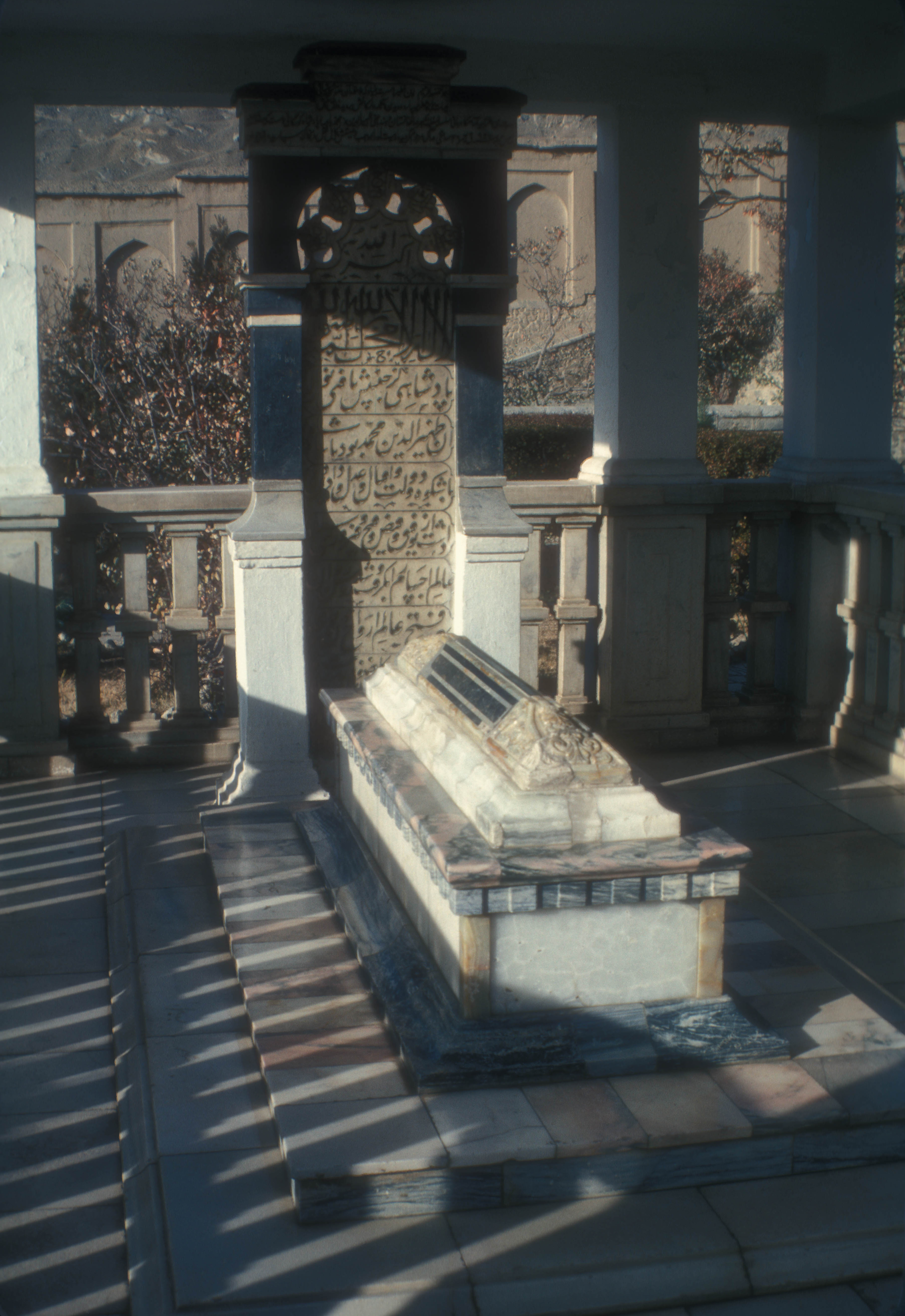
Bagh-e Babur, mausoleum of the founder of the Mughal Empire

==== Bangladesh ====
- Mausoleum of Kazi Nazrul Islam
- Mausoleum of Lalon Shah
- Mausoleum of Sheikh Mujibur Rahman
- Mausoleum of Three Leaders
- Mausoleum of Ziaur Rahman
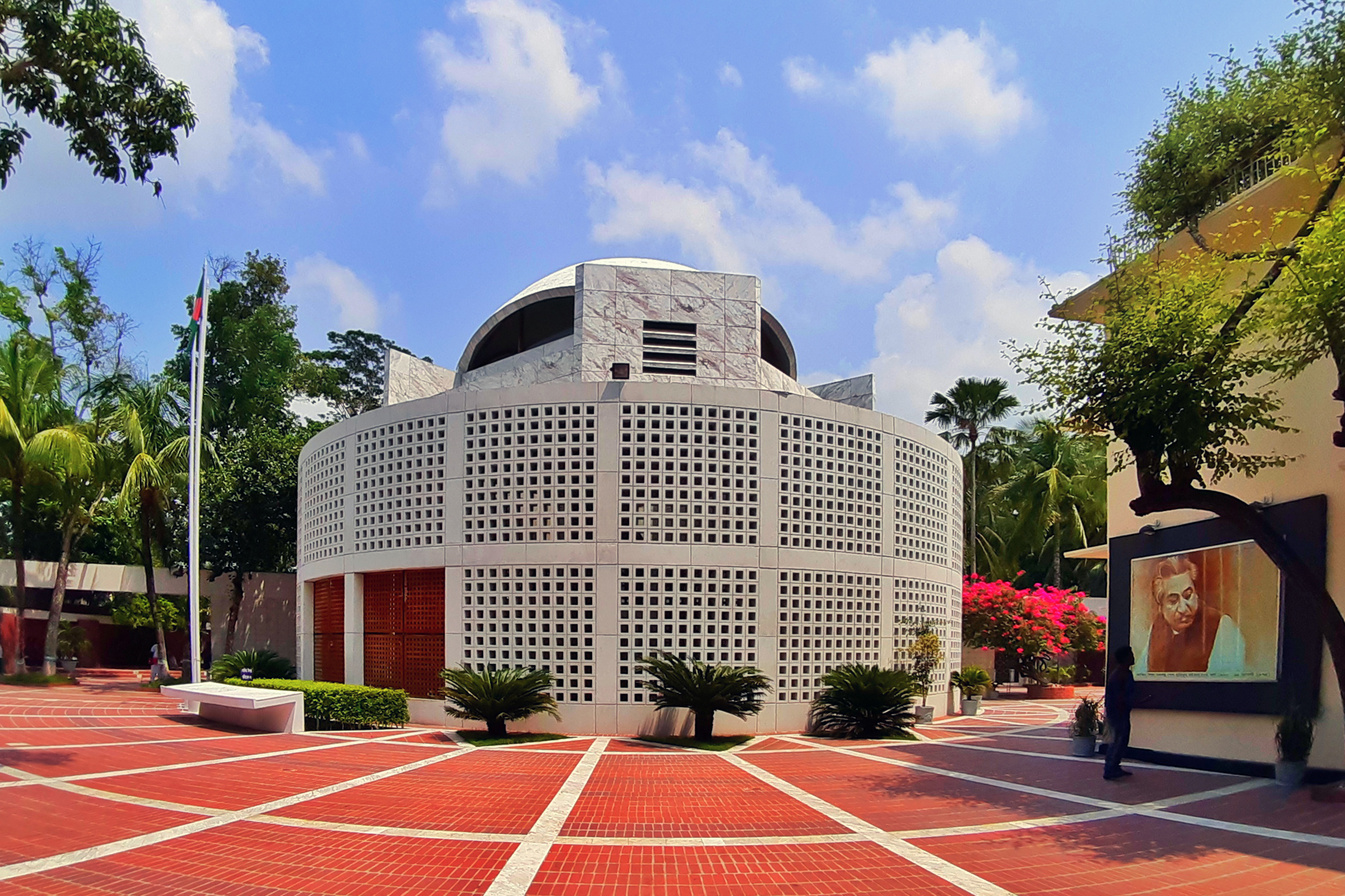
Mausoleum of Sheikh Mujibur Rahman

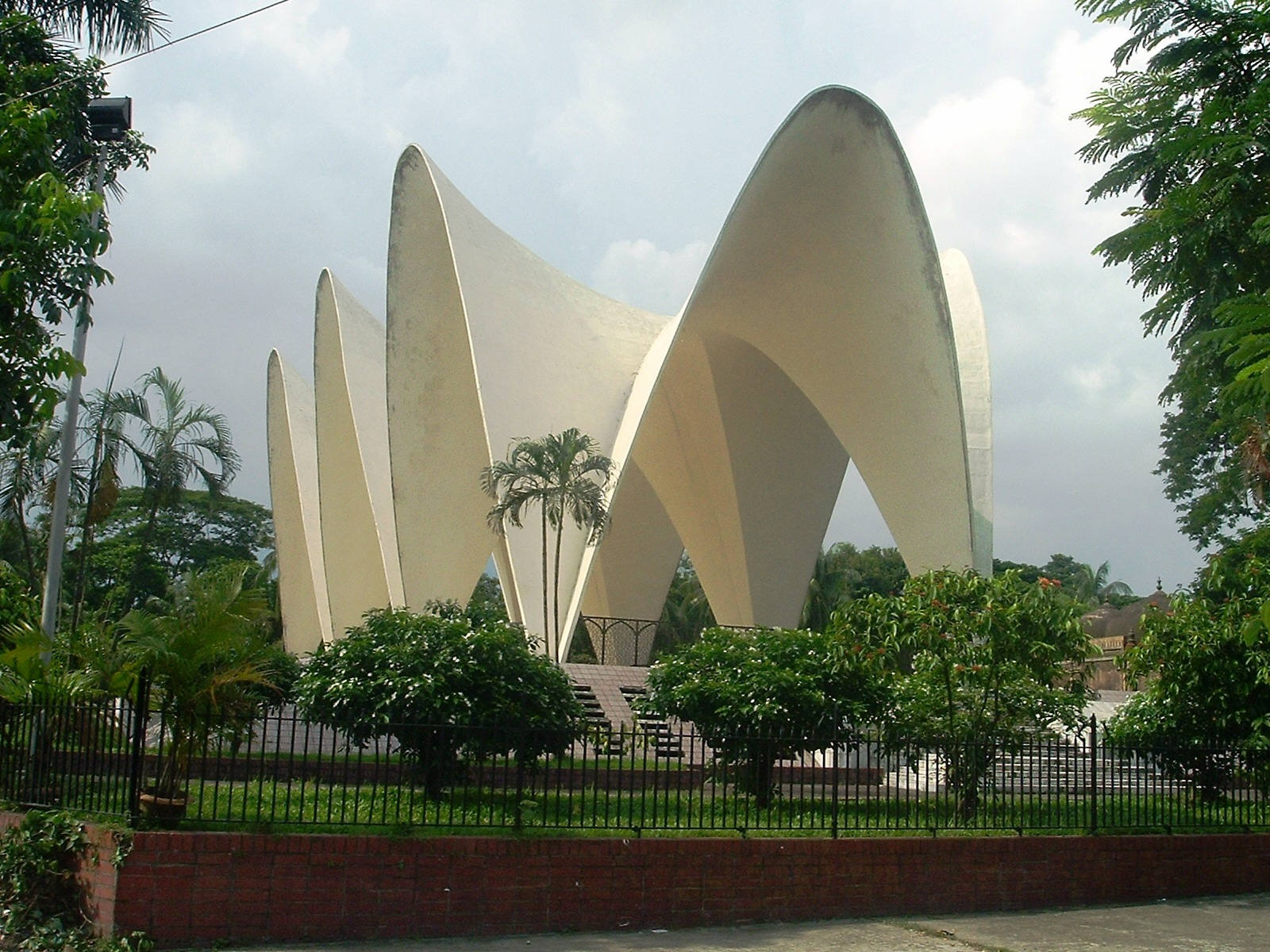
Mausoleum of Three Leaders

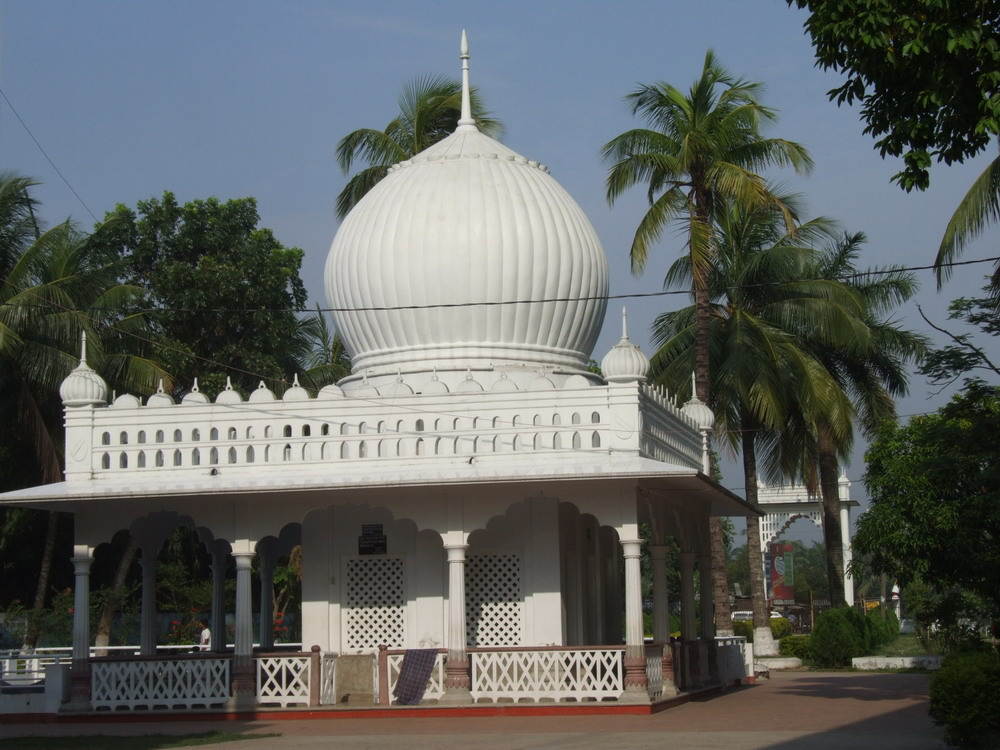
Mausoleum of Lalon Shah

==== China ====
- List of mausoleums of Chinese monarchs
  - Mausoleum of the First Qin Emperor biggest underground mausoleum
  - The pyramids of ancient China are also types of mausolea.
  - Qianling Mausoleum in China, houses the remains of Emperor Gaozong of Tang and the ruling Empress Wu Zetian, along with 17 others in auxiliary tombs.
  - Tomb and Mausoleum of Genghis Khan in Ordos City, Inner Mongolia.
  - Imperial Tombs of the Ming and Qing Dynasties
    - Ming Xiaoling Mausoleum, Nanjing
    - Thirteen Imperial Mausoleums of Ming Dynasty Emperors, Beijing
    - Fuling Tomb, Shenyang
    - Zhao Mausoleum (Qing Dynasty)
    - Eastern Qing Tombs
    - Western Qing Tombs
- Sun Yat-sen Mausoleum, Nanjing.
- Mausoleum of Yuan Shikai, Beiguan, Anyang.
- Mausoleum of Mao Zedong, Beijing.
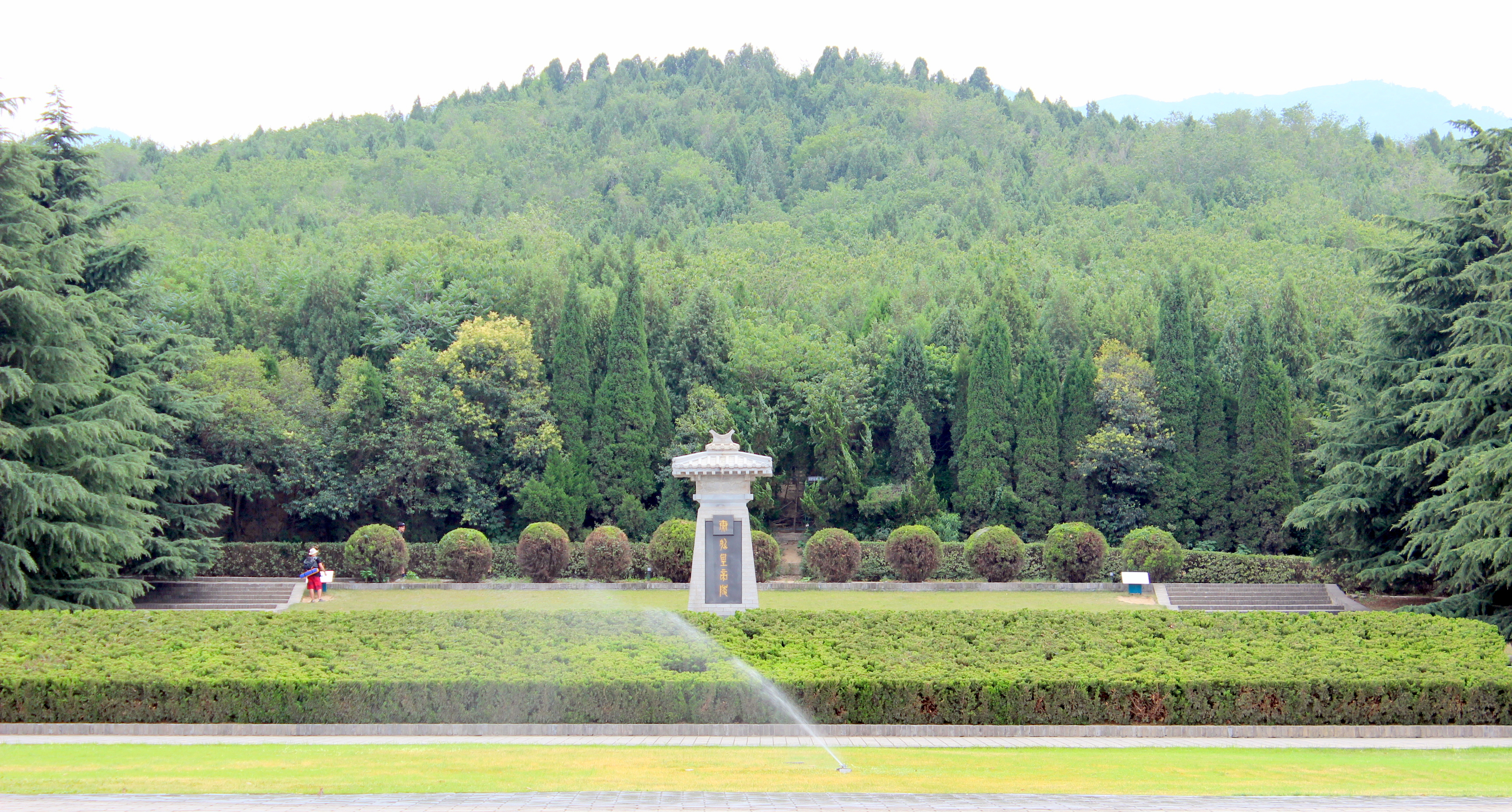
Mausoleum of the First Qin Emperor in Xi'an, China

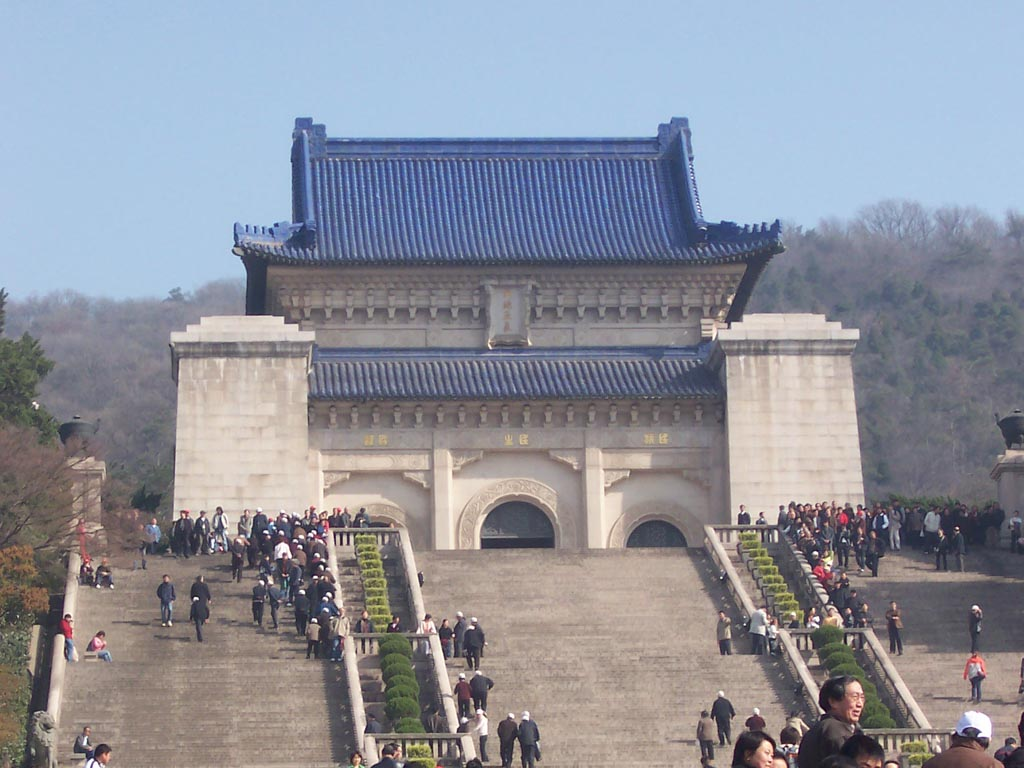
Sun Yat-sen Mausoleum, Nanjing, China

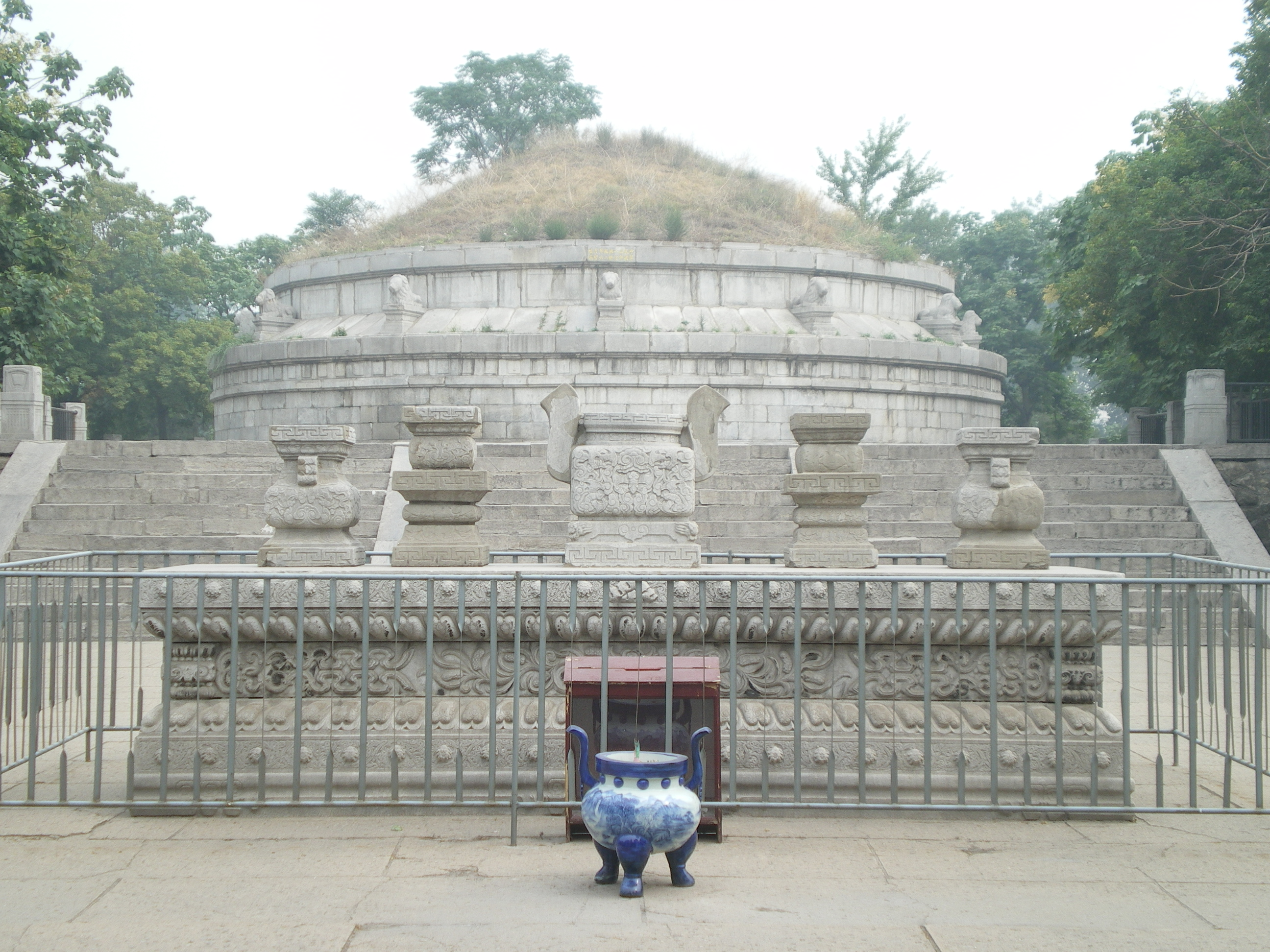
Mausoleum of Yuan Shikai, Beiguan, Anyang, China

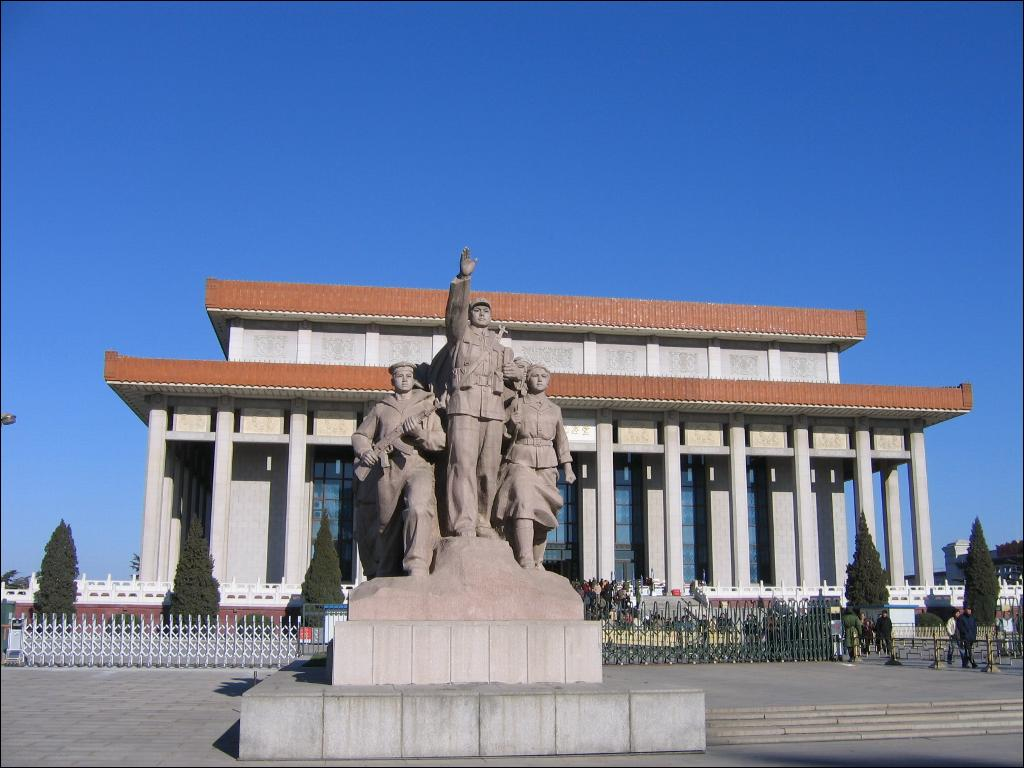
Mausoleum of Mao Zedong in Beijing, China

==== India ====
- Akbar's tomb, Agra
- Taj Mahal, Agra
- Qutb Shahi Tombs, Hyderabad
- Gol Gumbaz, Bijapur
- Humayun's Tomb, Delhi
- Tomb of Sher Shah Suri, Sasaram, Bihar
- Safdarjung's Tomb, Delhi
- Bibi Ka Maqbara, Aurangabad, Maharashtra
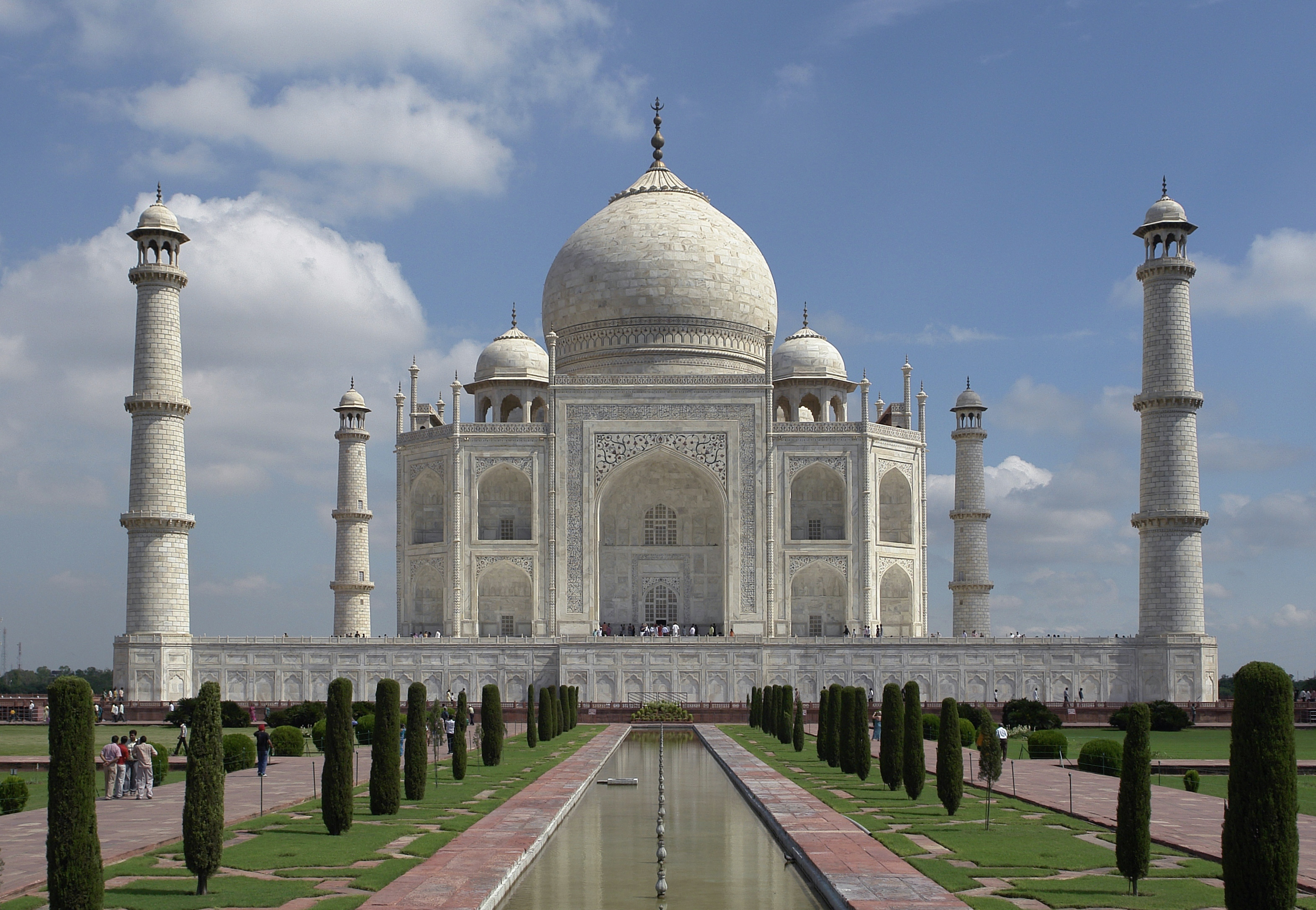
Taj Mahal in Agra, India

==== Indonesia ====
- Grave of Sukarno at Blitar, East Java, Indonesia
- Astana Giribangun at Karanganyar, Central Java, Indonesia
- Imogiri complex in Imogiri, Central Java is the cemetery for Mataram royals and the Hamengkubuwana Royals of Yogyakarta and Pakubuwono of Surakarta
- Mausoleum O. G. Khouw at Jakarta, Indonesia
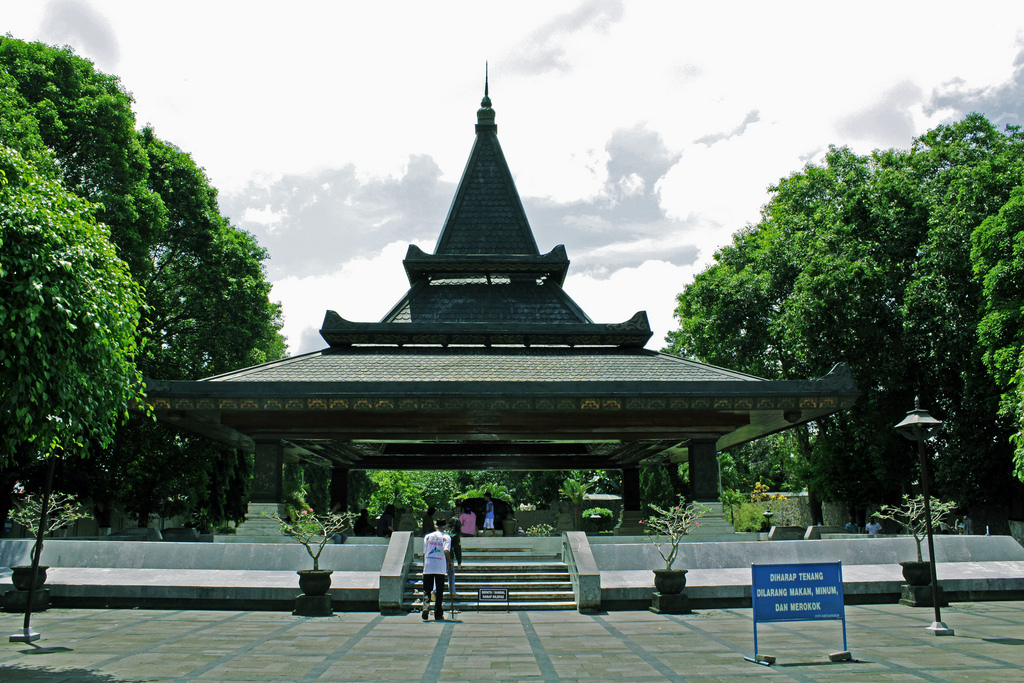
Grave of Sukarno

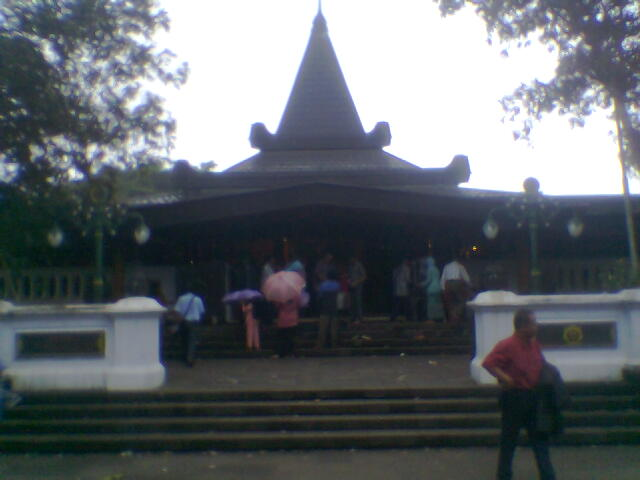
Astana Giribangun

==== Japan ====
- Mausoleums of Emperors of Japan
  - Mozu Tombs in Sakai, Osaka Prefecture
  - Fukakusa no kita no Misasagi (深草北陵) in Kyoto
  - Sennyū-ji, Kyoto
    - Tsuki no wa no misasagi (月輪陵)
  - Fushimi Momoyama no Misasagi (伏見桃山陵), Kyoto
  - Musashi Imperial Graveyard, is a mausoleum complex at Hachiōji, Tokyo
- Toyokuni Shrine at Higashiyama-ku, Kyoto. Mausoleum of Kampaku Toyotomi Hideyoshi, which was later destroyed by the Tokugawa clan.
- Nikkō Tōshō-gū at Nikkō, Tochigi Prefecture. It is part of the "Shrines and Temples of Nikkō", Mausoleum of Tokugawa Ieyasu, Tokugawa shōguns.
- Rinnō-ji at Nikkō, Tochigi Prefecture. The temple also administers the Taiyū-in Reibyō (大猷院霊廟), which is the mausoleum of Tokugawa Iemitsu, the third Tokugawa shōgun. Together with Nikkō Tōshō-gū and Futarasan Shrine.
- Zuihōden at Sendai, Miyagi Prefecture is the mausoleum complex of Date Masamune and his heirs, daimyō of the Sendai Domain
- Tamaudun, at Shuri, Okinawa
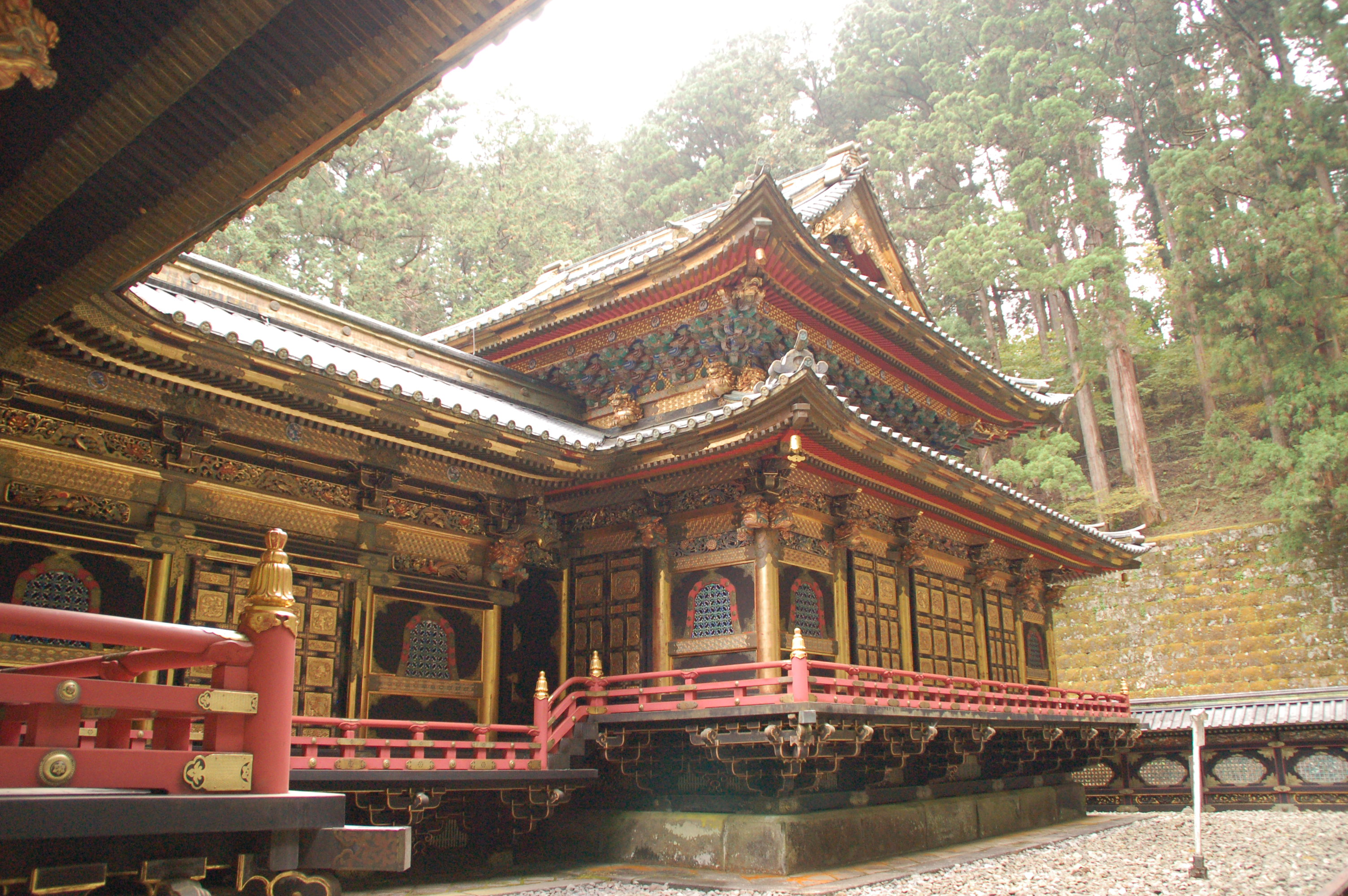
Taiyū-in Reibyō at Nikkō, Tochigi Prefecture

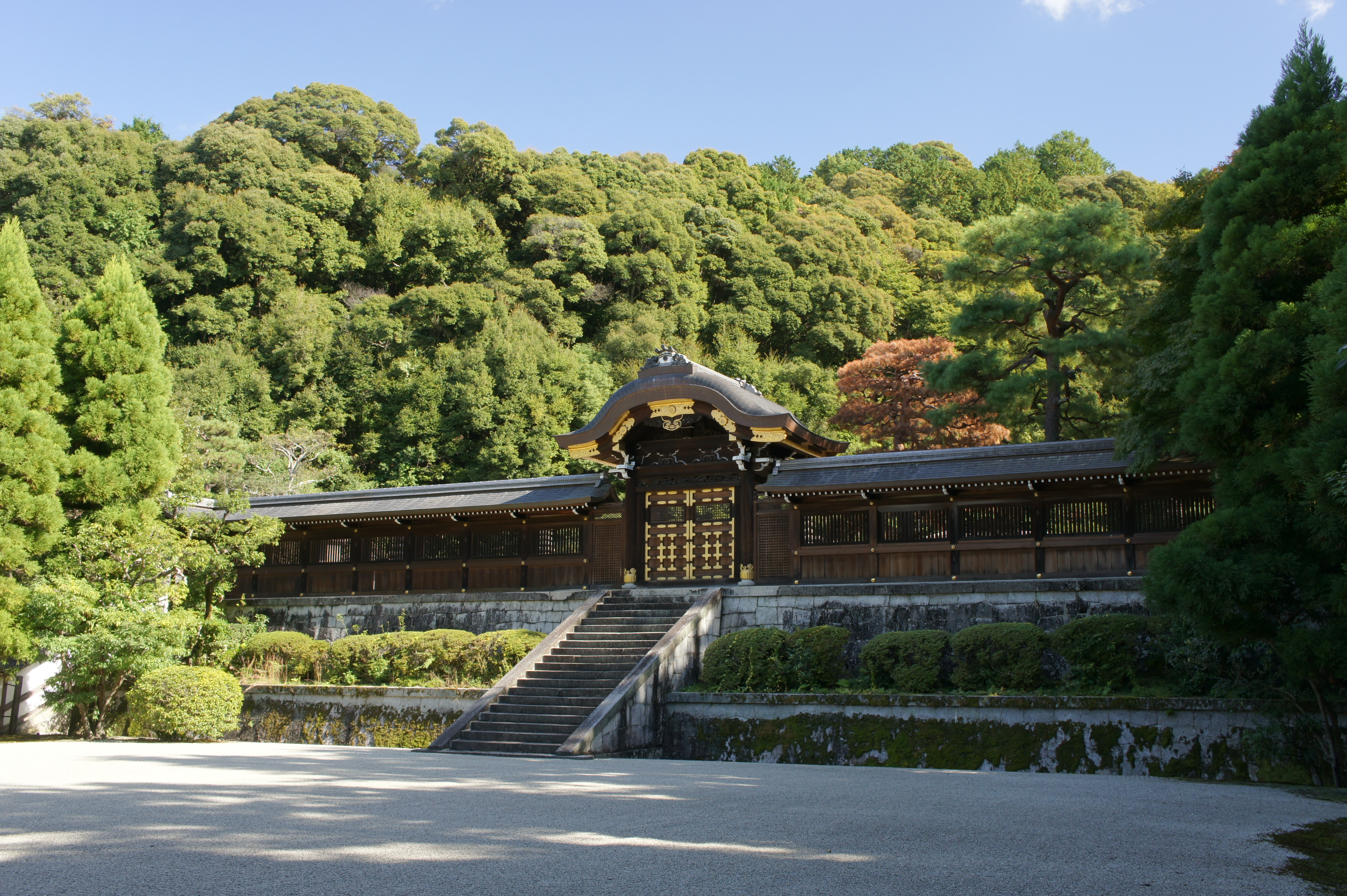
Tsuki no wa no misasagi in Sennyū-ji, Kyoto

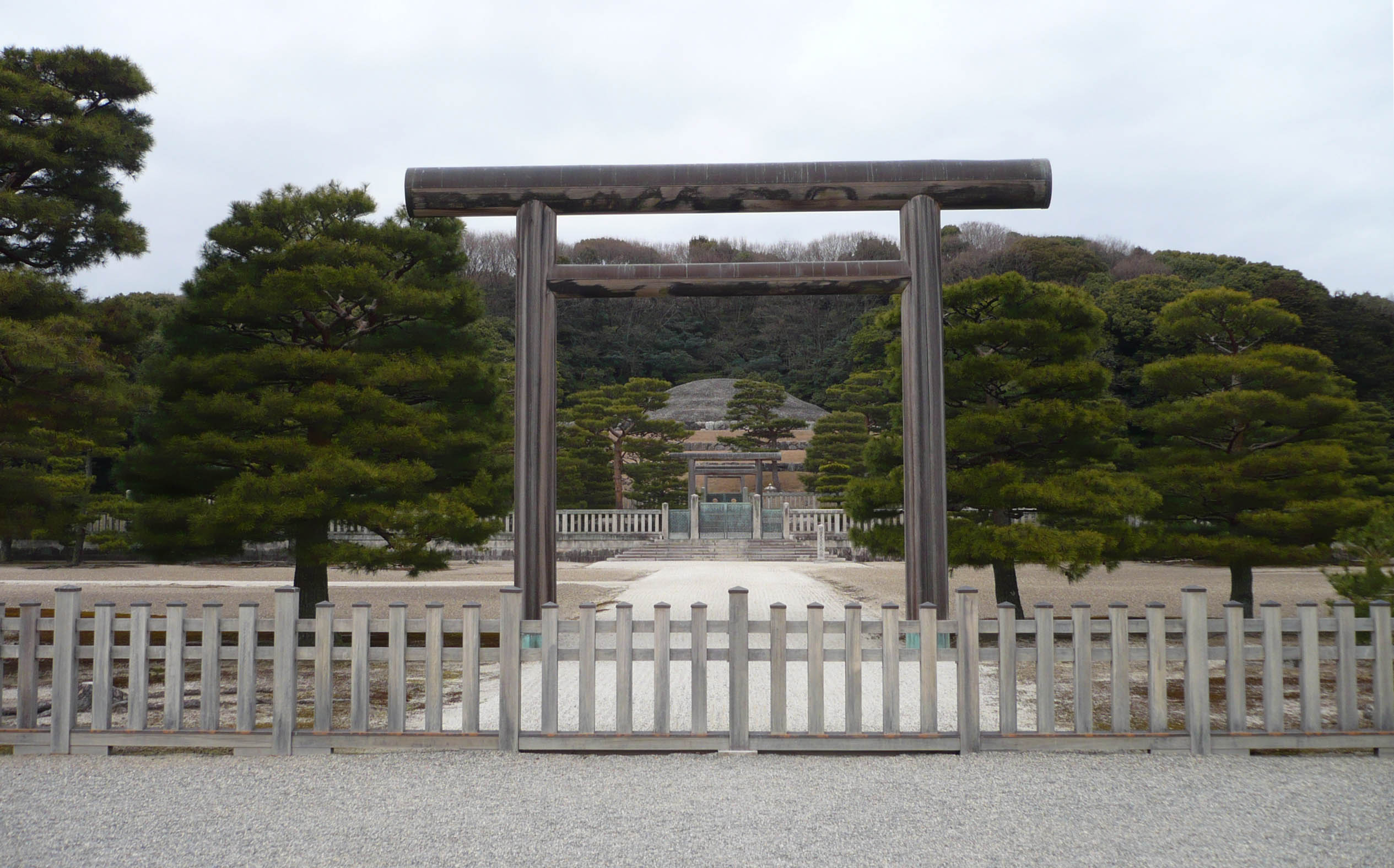
Fushimi Momoyama no Misasagi in Kyoto, Kyoto Prefecture

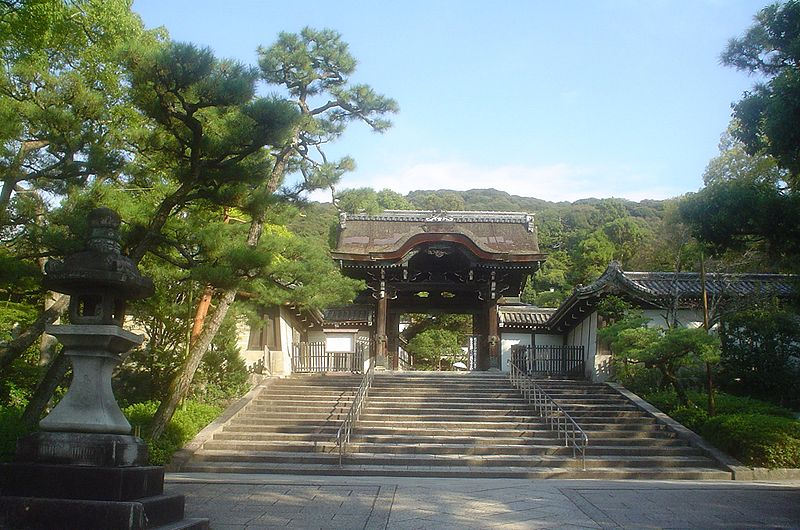
The entrance to Higashi Otani Mausoleum, Kyoto

==== Malaysia ====
- Makam Pahlawan at National Mosque of Malaysia, Kuala Lumpur
- Makam Diraja Mahmoodiah at Bukit Mahmoodiah in Jalan Mahmoodiah, Johor Bahru, Johor
- Hang Kasturi Mausoleum at Jonker Walk, Melaka City, Melaka
- Kedah Royal Mausoleum at Langgar, Kota Setar District, Kedah
- Kelantan Royal Mausoleum
- Al-Ghufran Royal Mausoleum at Bukit Chandan in Jalan Istana, Kuala Kangsar
- Hang Jebat Mausoleum in Melaka City, Melaka
- Shah Alam Royal Mausoleum
- Tun Teja Mausoleum in Merlimau, Jasin District, Melaka
- Seri Menanti Royal Mausoleum
- Sultan Abdul Samad Mausoleum in Jugra, Banting, Selangor
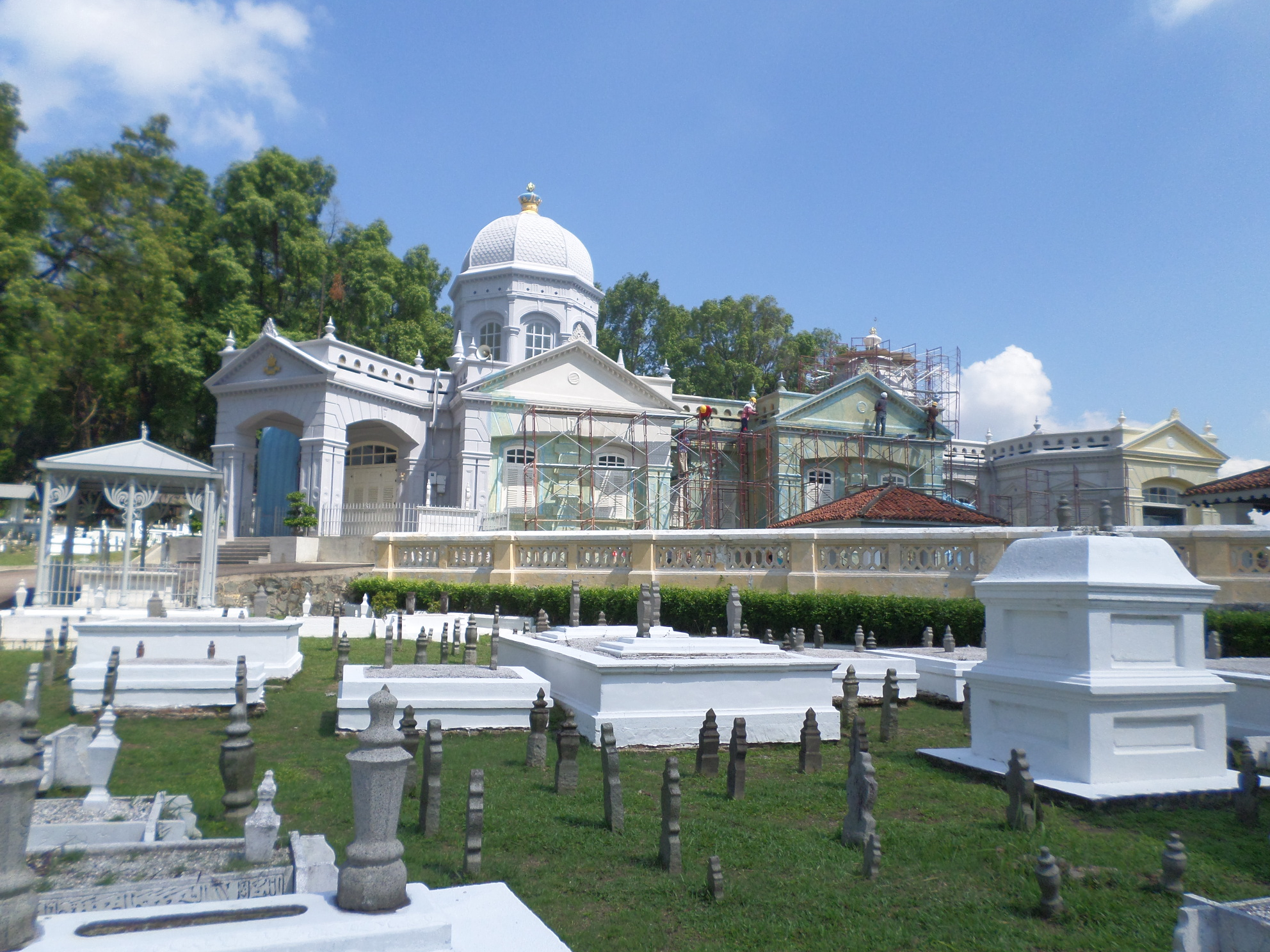
Makam Diraja Mahmoodiah at Bukit Mahmoodiah in Jalan Mahmoodiah, Johor Bahru, Johor

==== Pakistan ====
- Tomb of Jahangir at Shahdara, near Lahore, Pakistan.
- Mazar-e-Quaid at Karachi, Pakistan
- Tomb of Allama Iqbal at Lahore, Pakistan
- Data Durbar at Lahore, Pakistan
- Samadhi of Maharaja Ranjit Singh in Lahore, Pakistan
- Bhutto family mausoleum, Garhi Khuda Bakhsh, Sindh, Pakistan
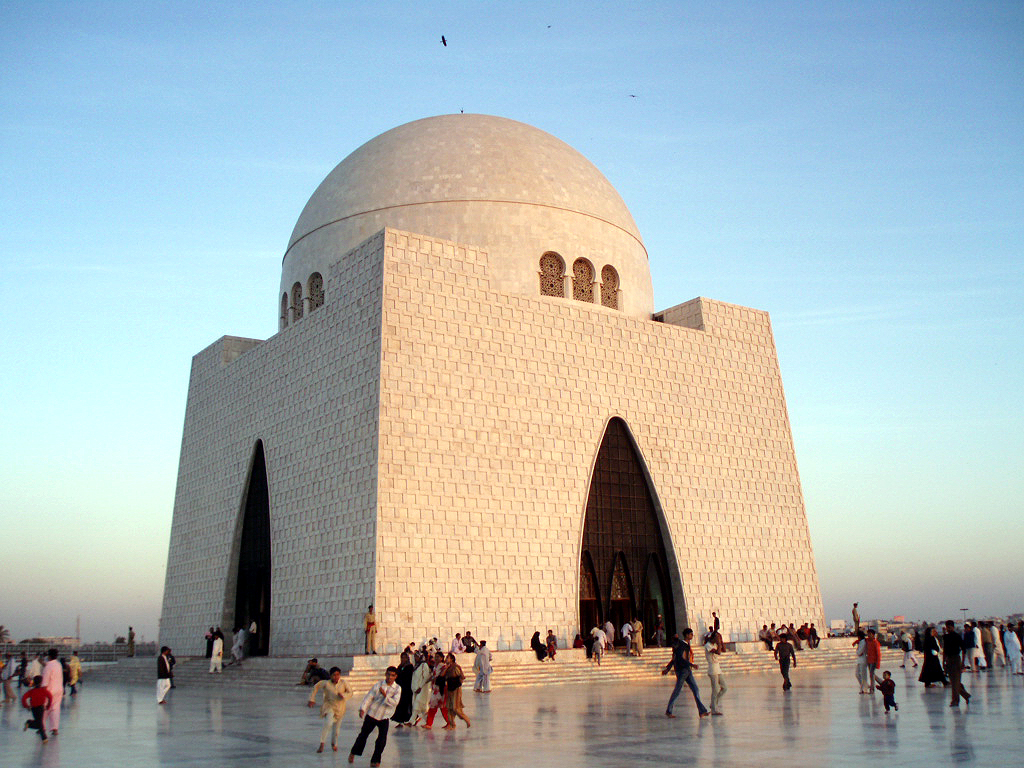
Muhammad Ali Jinnah Mausoleum in Karachi, Pakistan

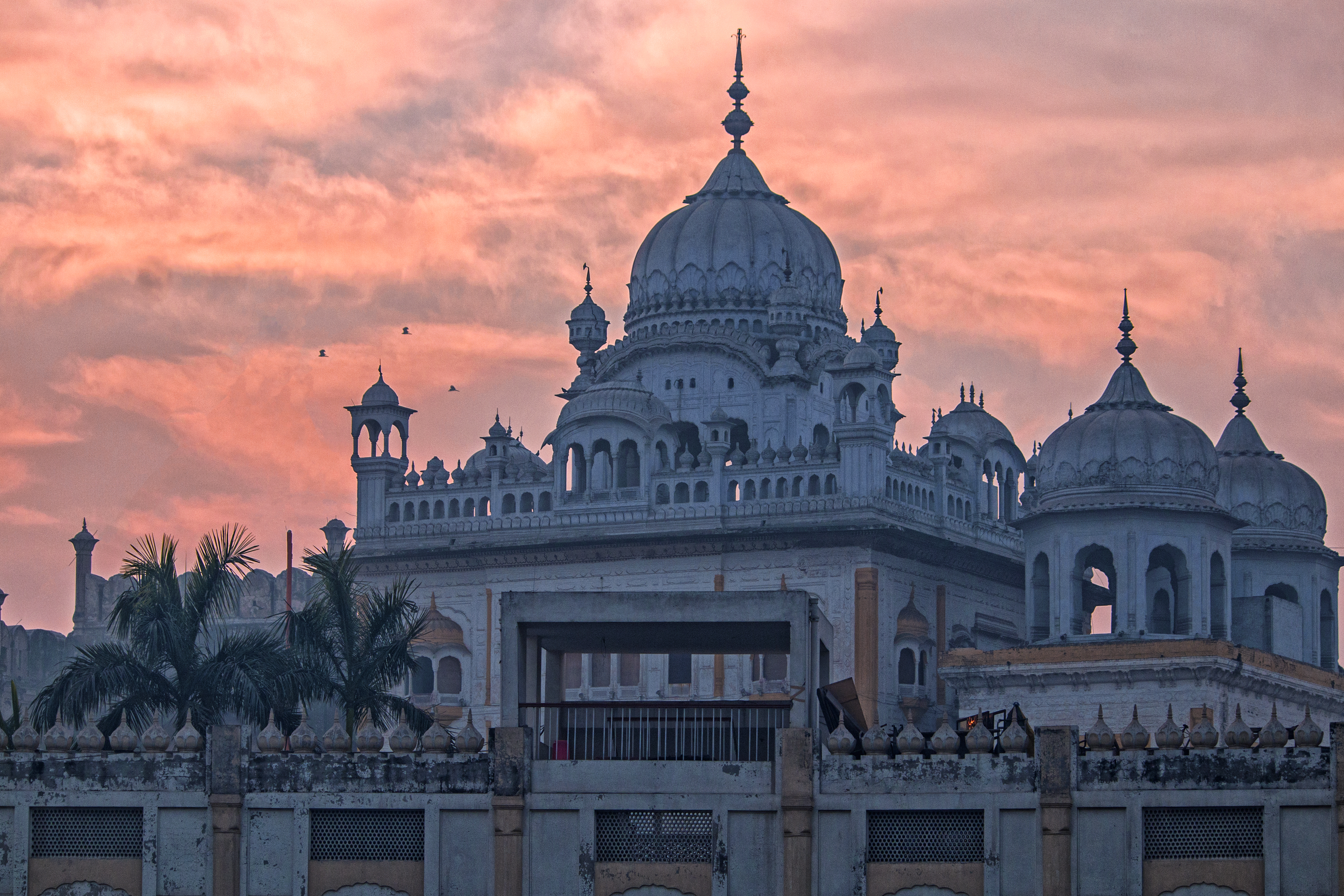
Samadhi of Ranjit Singh, founder of the Sikh Empire at Lahore, Pakistan

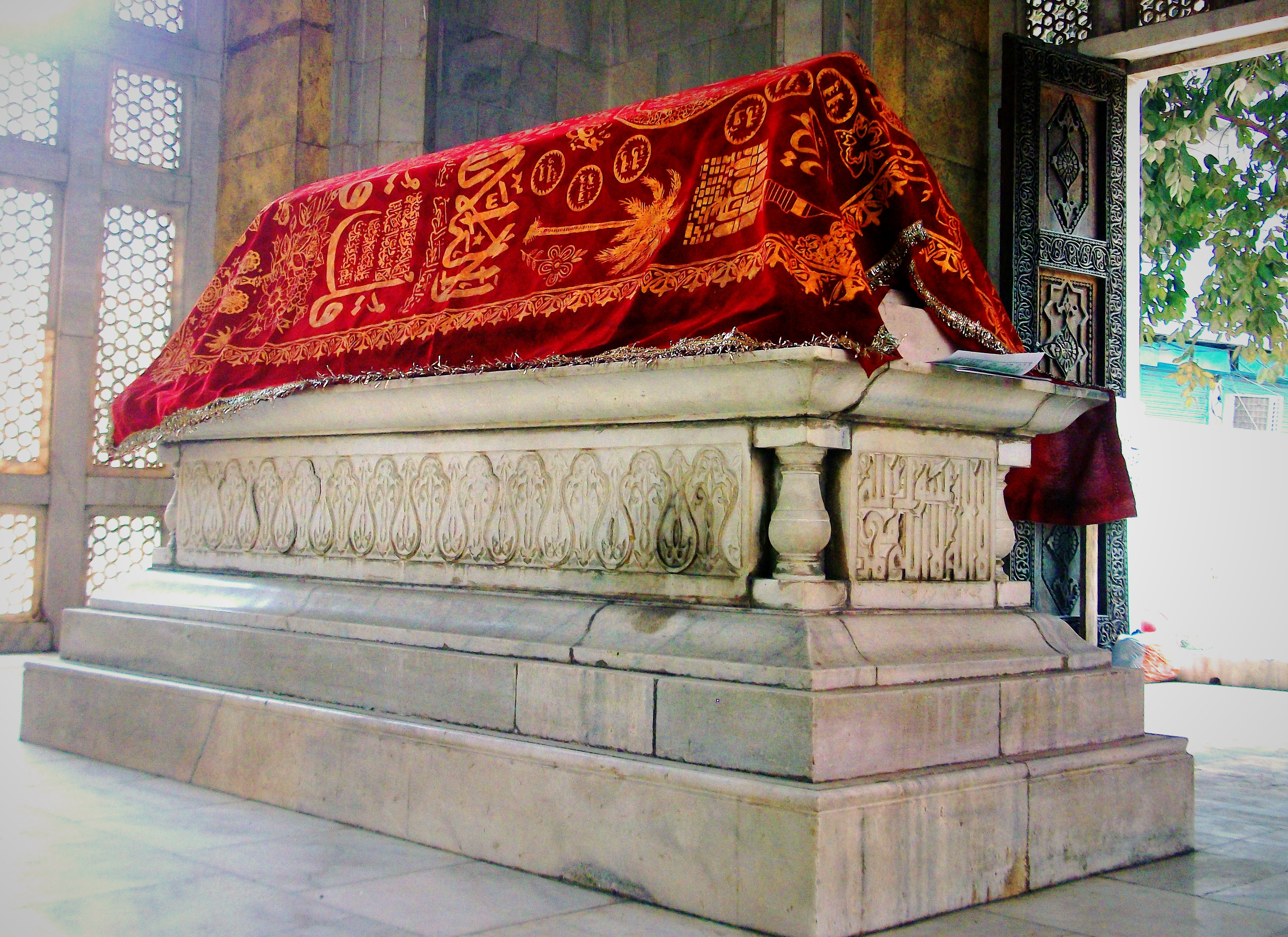
Tomb of Qutb ud-Din Aibak, founder of the Delhi Sultanate at Lahore, Pakistan

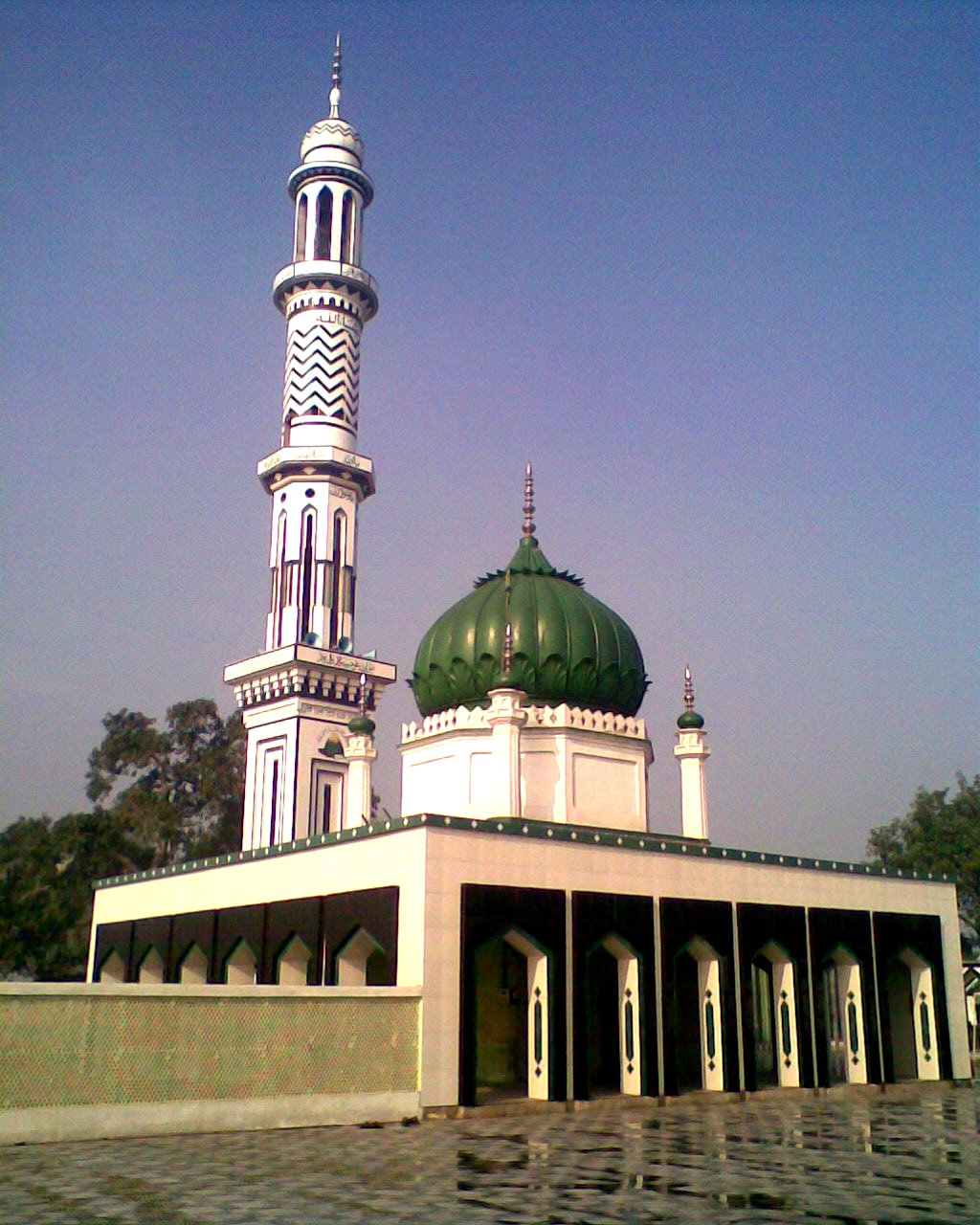
Shrine of Islamic Naqshbandi saints of Allo Mahar Sharif.

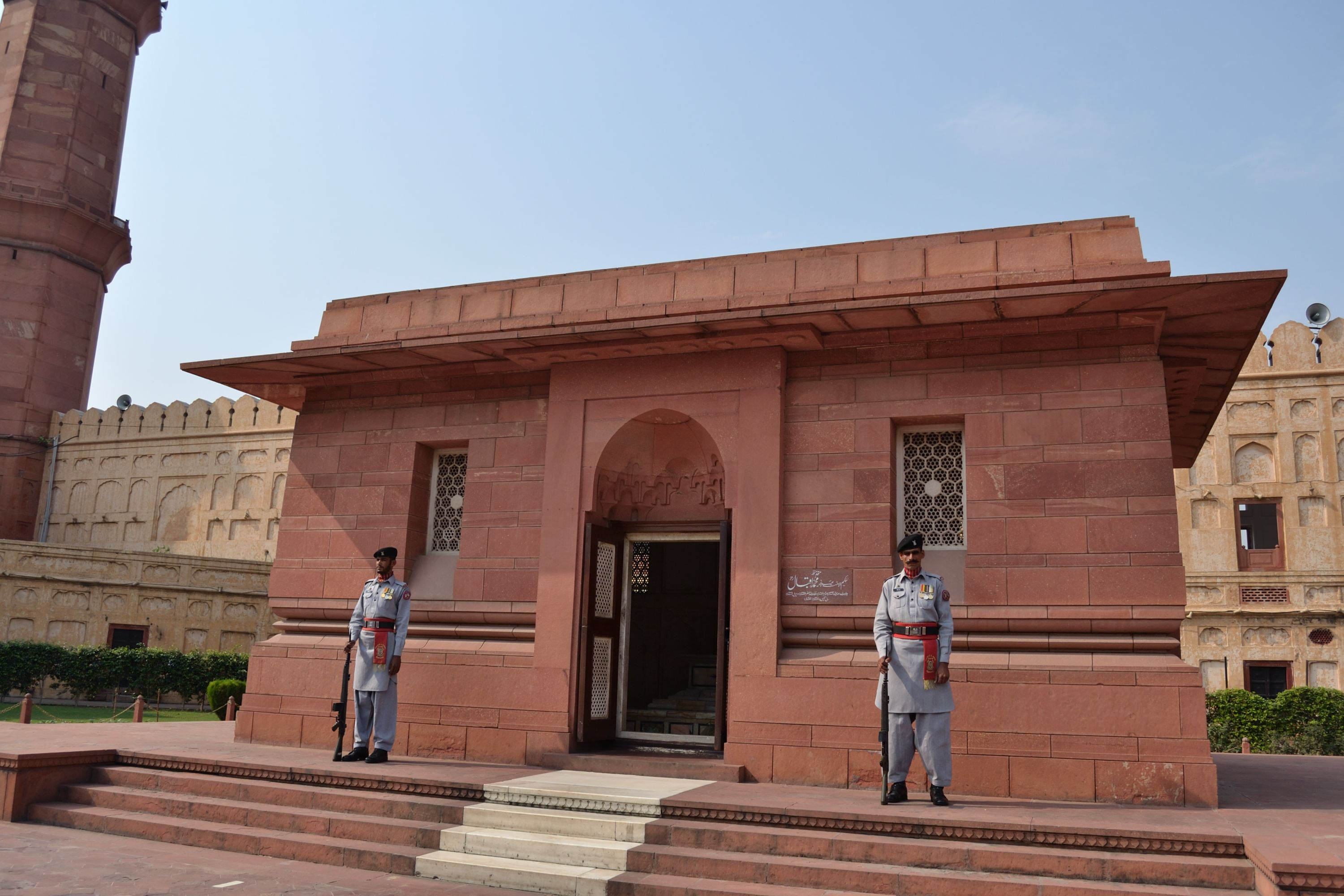
Tomb of Allama Iqbal at Lahore, Pakistan

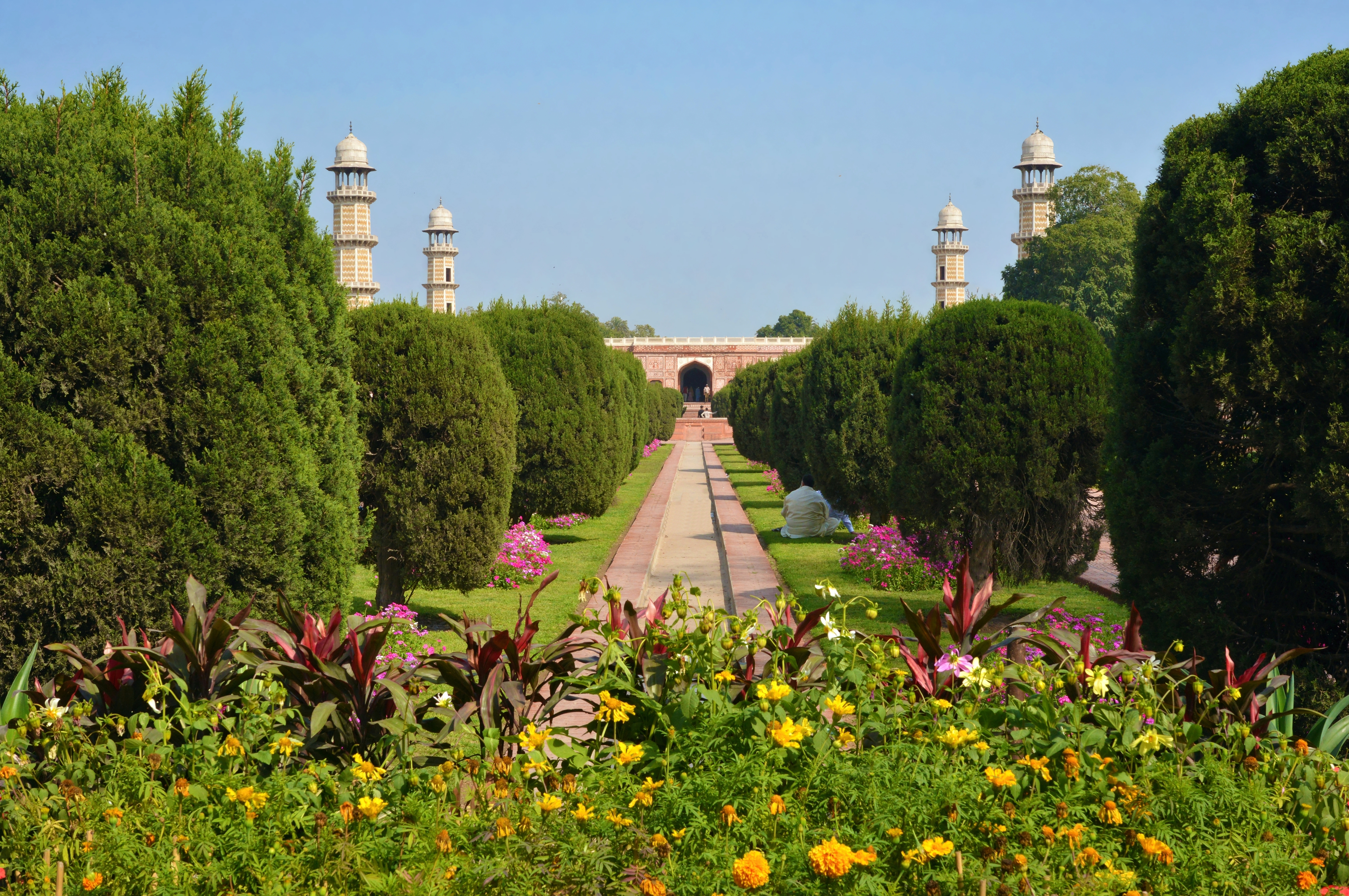
The exterior view of the Mausoleum of Emperor Jahangir, located in Punjab, Pakistan

==== Philippines ====
- Rizal Monument at Rizal Park in Manila, Philippines, houses the remains of Dr. Jose Rizal, national hero of the Philippines.
- Aguinaldo Shrine in Kawit, Cavite, Philippines.
- Mausoleum of the Veterans of the Revolution, enshrining participants in the 1896 revolution against the Spanish Empire.
- Quezon Memorial, in Quezon City, Philippines, houses the remains of President Manuel L. Quezon and his wife, Aurora.
- Marcos Museum and Mausoleum in Batac, Ilocos Norte, Philippines, housing the remains of President Ferdinand Marcos.

==== Taiwan ====
- National Dr. Sun Yat-sen Memorial Hall, Taipei, Taiwan.
- Mausoleum of late President Chiang Kai-shek, Taoyuan, Taiwan.
- Mausoleum of late President Chiang Ching-kuo, Taoyuan, Taiwan.
- Chen Tsyr-shiou Memorial Park, Former Mausoleum and Memorial of late Vice President Chen Cheng, Taishan District, New Taipei, Taiwan.
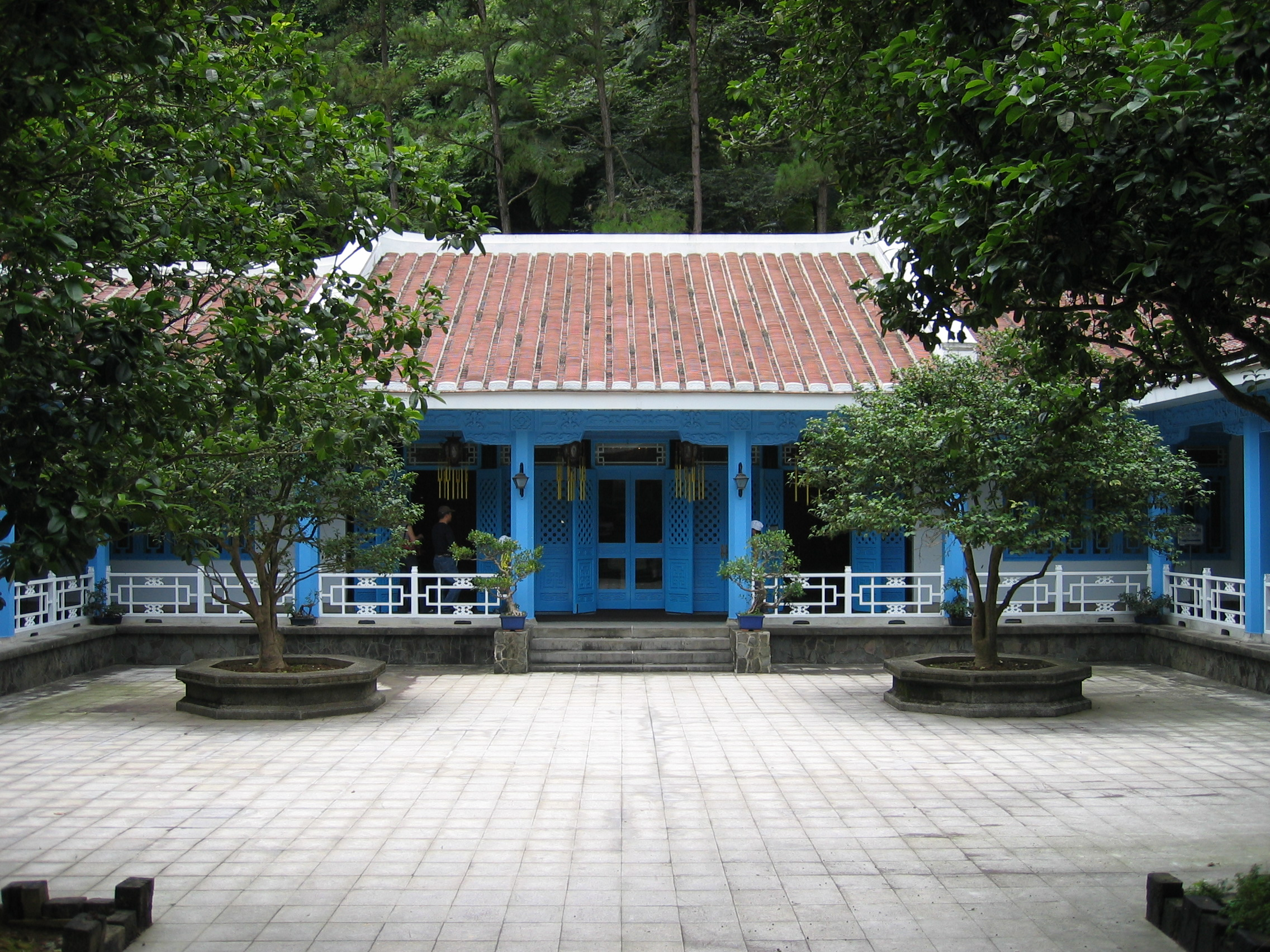
Mausoleum of late President Chiang in Taoyuan, Taiwan

==== Others ====
- Konbaung tombs are a collection of mausoleums built by Konbaung Dynasty kings in Mandalay, Amarapura, and Inwa, Myanmar.
- Kandawmin Garden Mausolea, Myanmar.
- Martyrs' Mausoleum, Myanmar.
- Royal Cemetery at Wat Ratchabophit, Thailand
- Royal Tombs of the Joseon Dynasty, Korea
- Kim Koo Museum and Hyochang Park, Seoul, Republic of Korea (South Korea)
- Bandaranaike family Estate in Horagolla Bandaranaike Samadhi, Sri Lanka
- Kurjey Lhakhang, Bumthang Valley, Bumthang District, Bhutan
- Silver Pagoda, Phnom Penh, Cambodia
- Ho Chi Minh Mausoleum, Hanoi, Vietnam
- Kumsusan Palace of the Sun or Kim Il Sung Mausoleum, Pyongyang, Democratic People's Republic of Korea (North Korea)
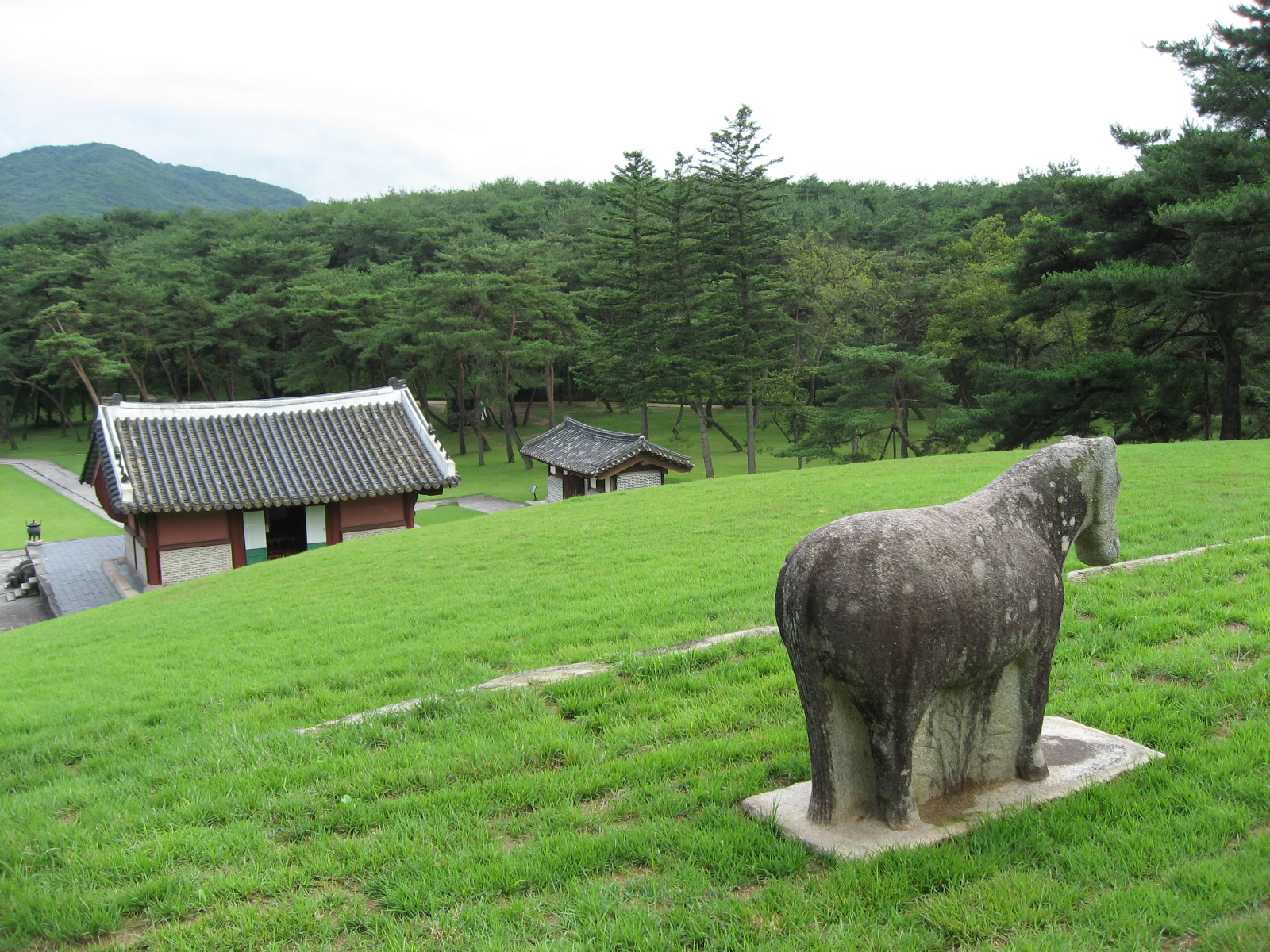
Yeongneung, King Sejong's mausoleum in Yeoju, South Korea

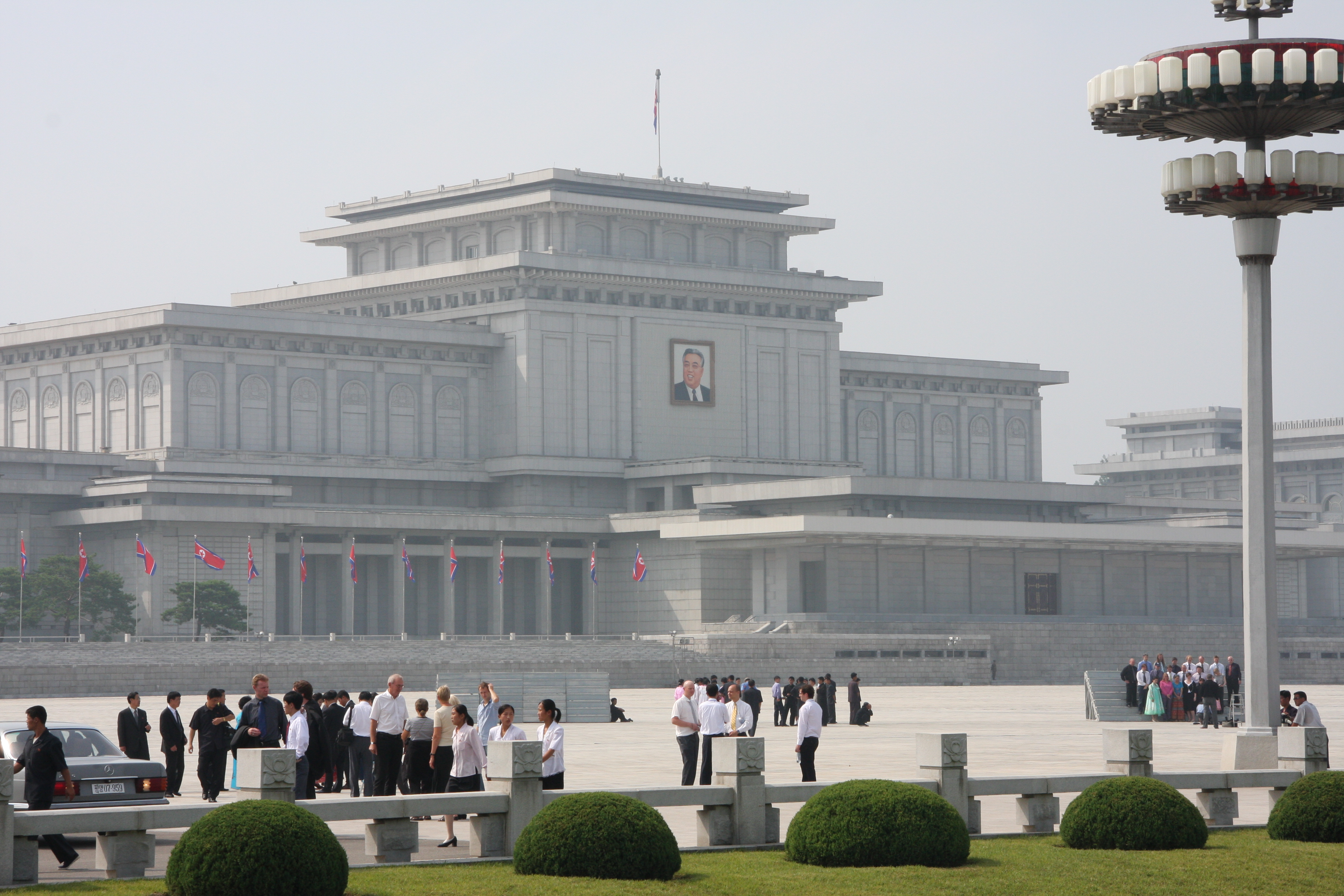
Kumsusan Palace of the Sun, Kim Il Sung and Kim Jong Il's mausoleum in Pyongyang, North Korea

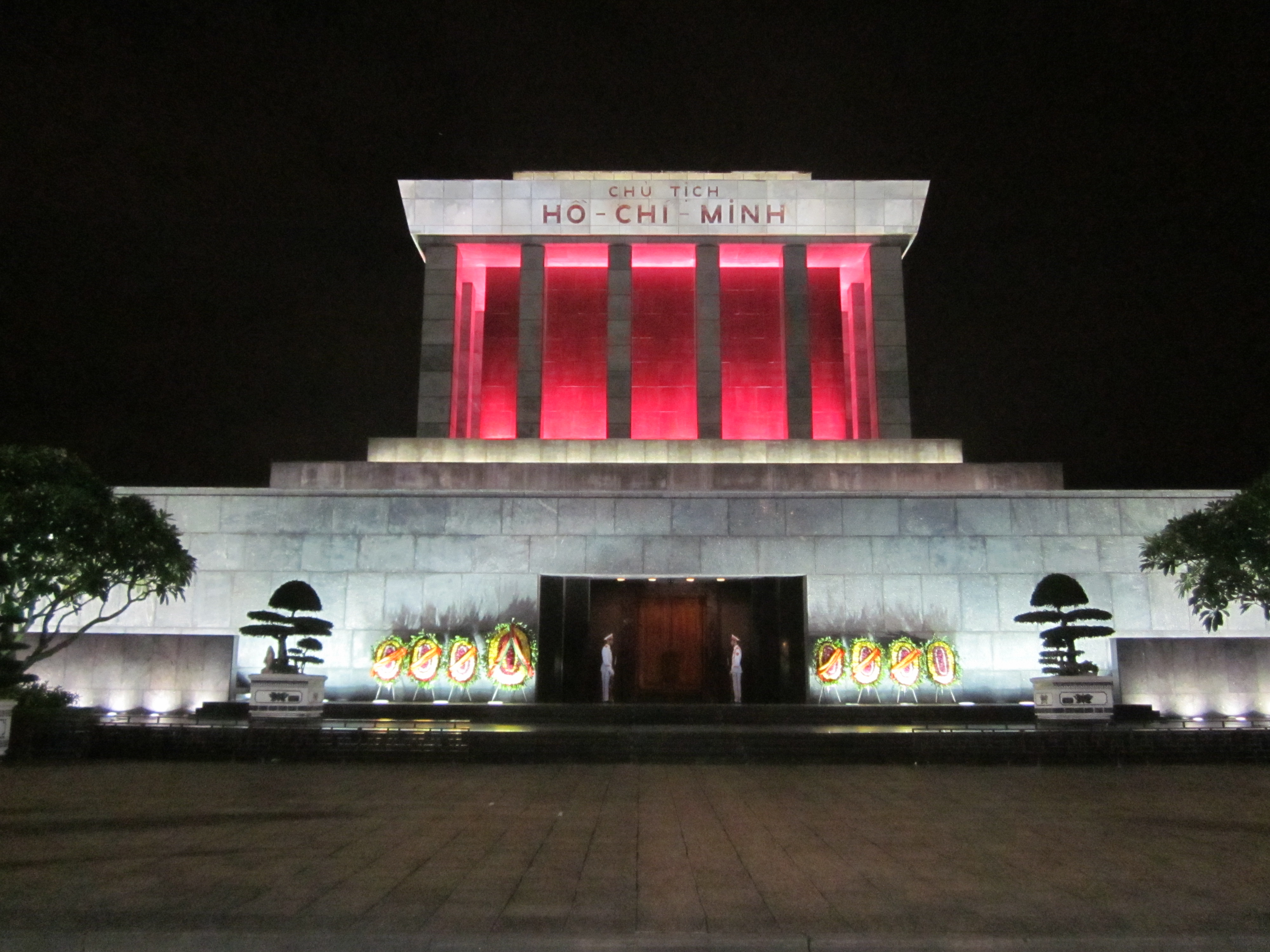
Ho Chi Minh Mausoleum in Hanoi, Vietnam

Türkmenbaşy Ruhy Mosque in Gypjak, Ashgabat, Turkmenistan

=== Asia, western ===
==== Iran ====
- Mausoleum of Cyrus the Great in Pasargadae
- Naqsh-e Rustam at Persepolis, containing the tombs of Persian Achaemenid kings (522-486 BCE)
- Tomb of Ferdowsi in Mashhad
- Tomb of Hafez (Hāfezieh) in Shiraz
- Mausoleum of Saadi Shirazi in Shiraz
- Mausoleum of Avicenna in Hamedan
- Mausoleum of Omar Khayyám in Nishapur
- Imam Reza shrine in Mashhad
- Mausoleum of Khomeini in Tehran
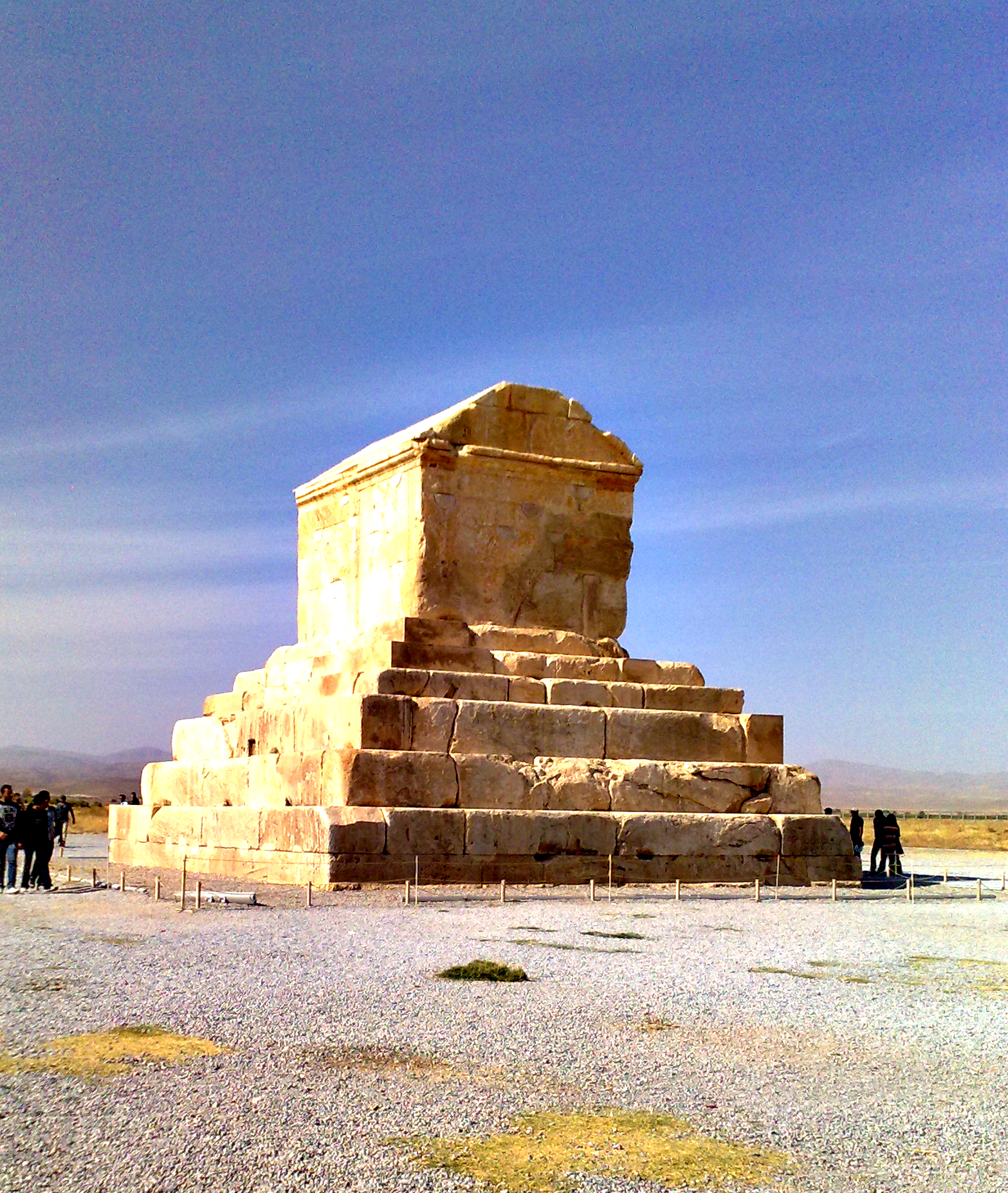
Mausoleum of Cyrus the Great in Pasargadae, Iran

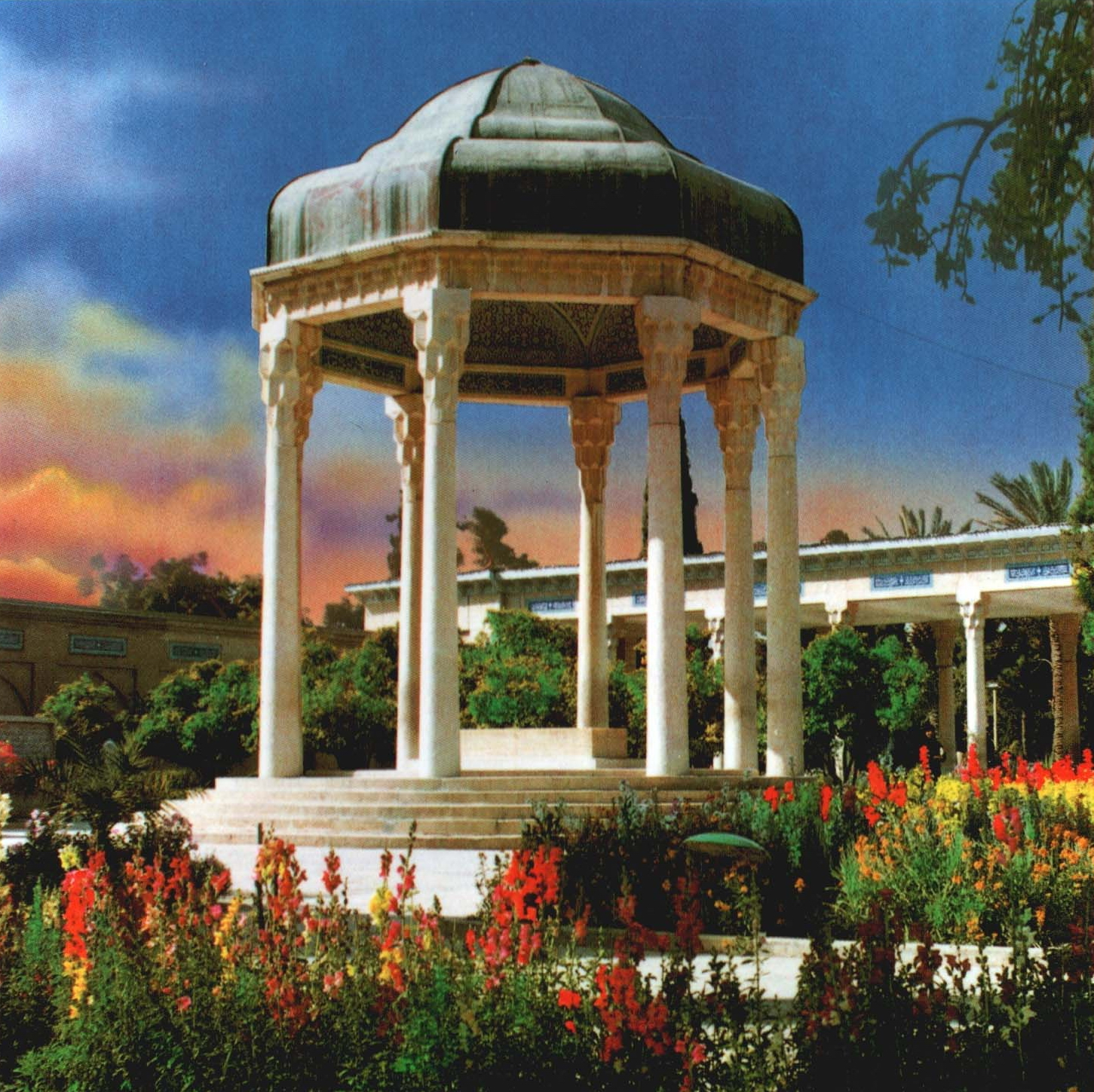
Tomb of Hafez (Hāfezieh) in Shiraz, Iran

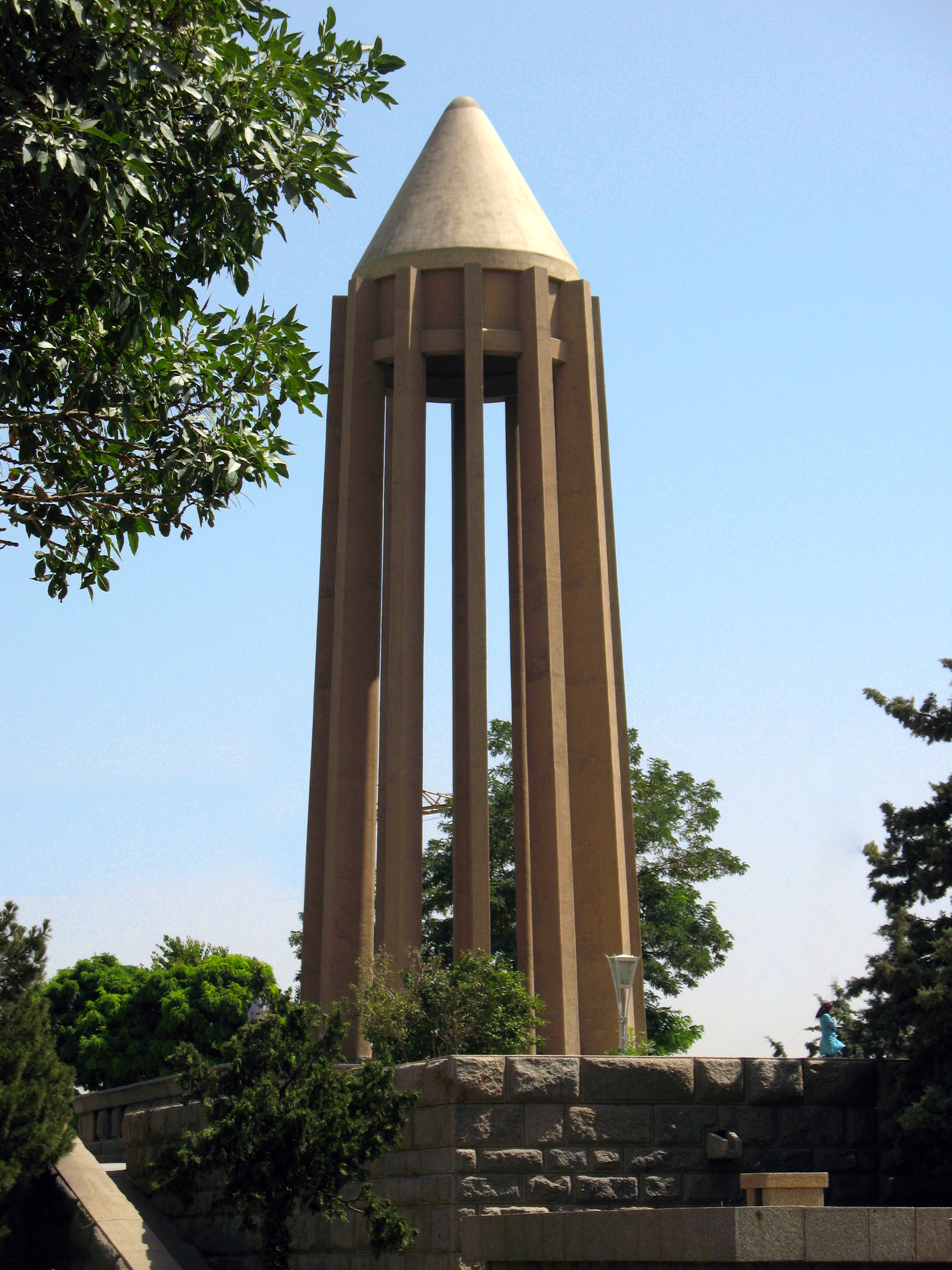
Tomb of Avicenna, Hamadan

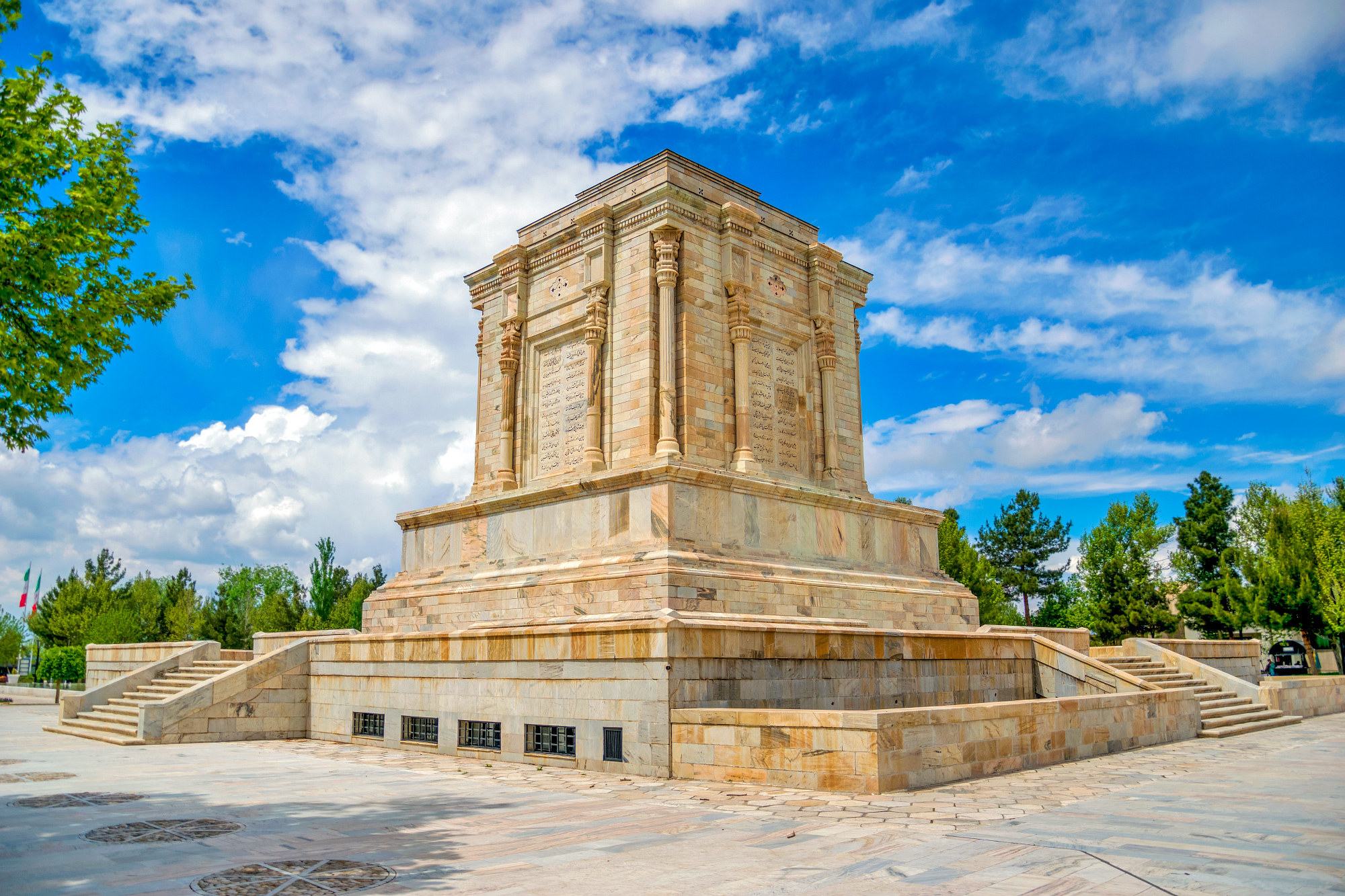
The Mausoleum of Ferdowsi, Mashhad

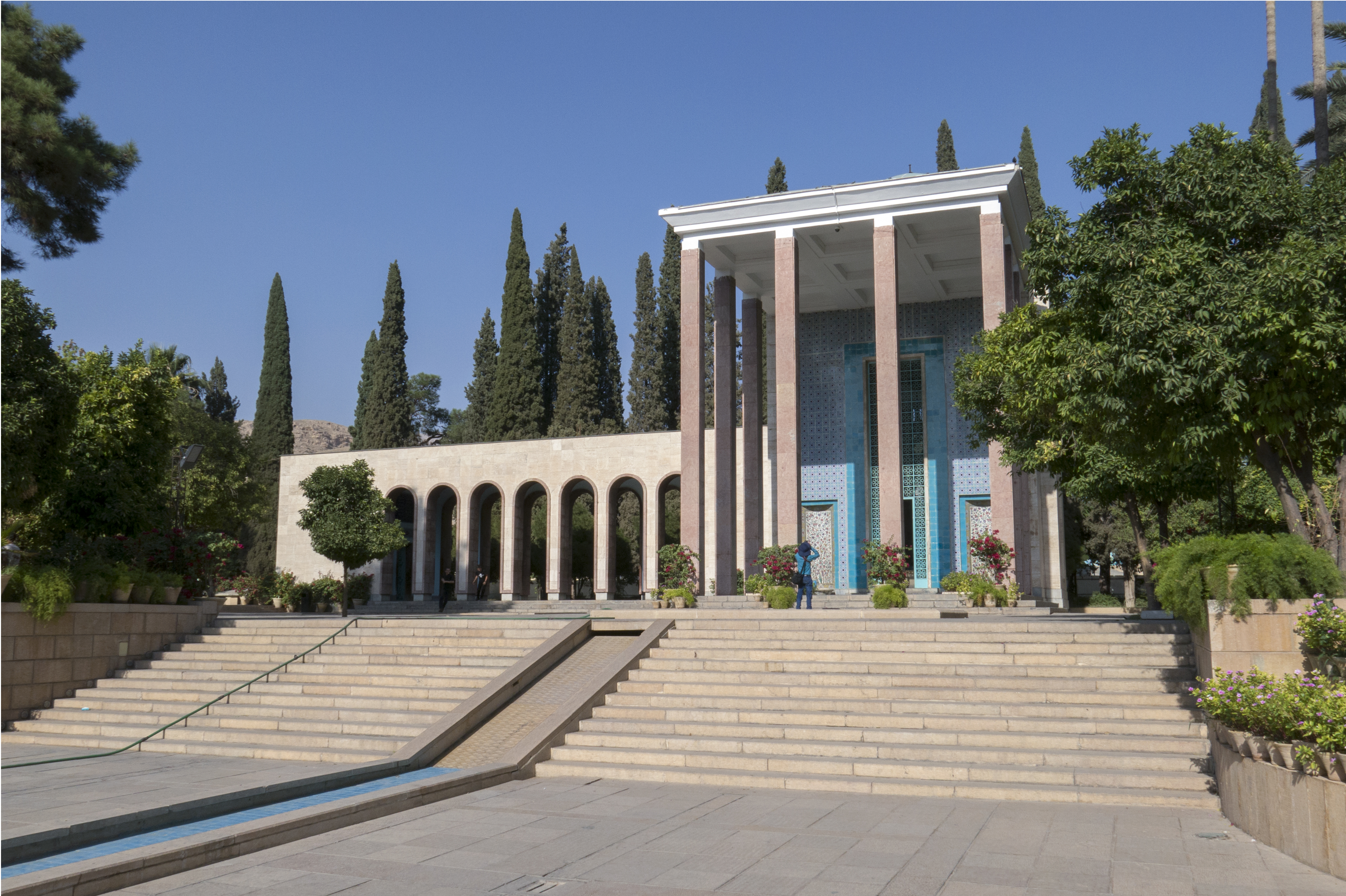
The Mausoleum of Saadi Shirazi

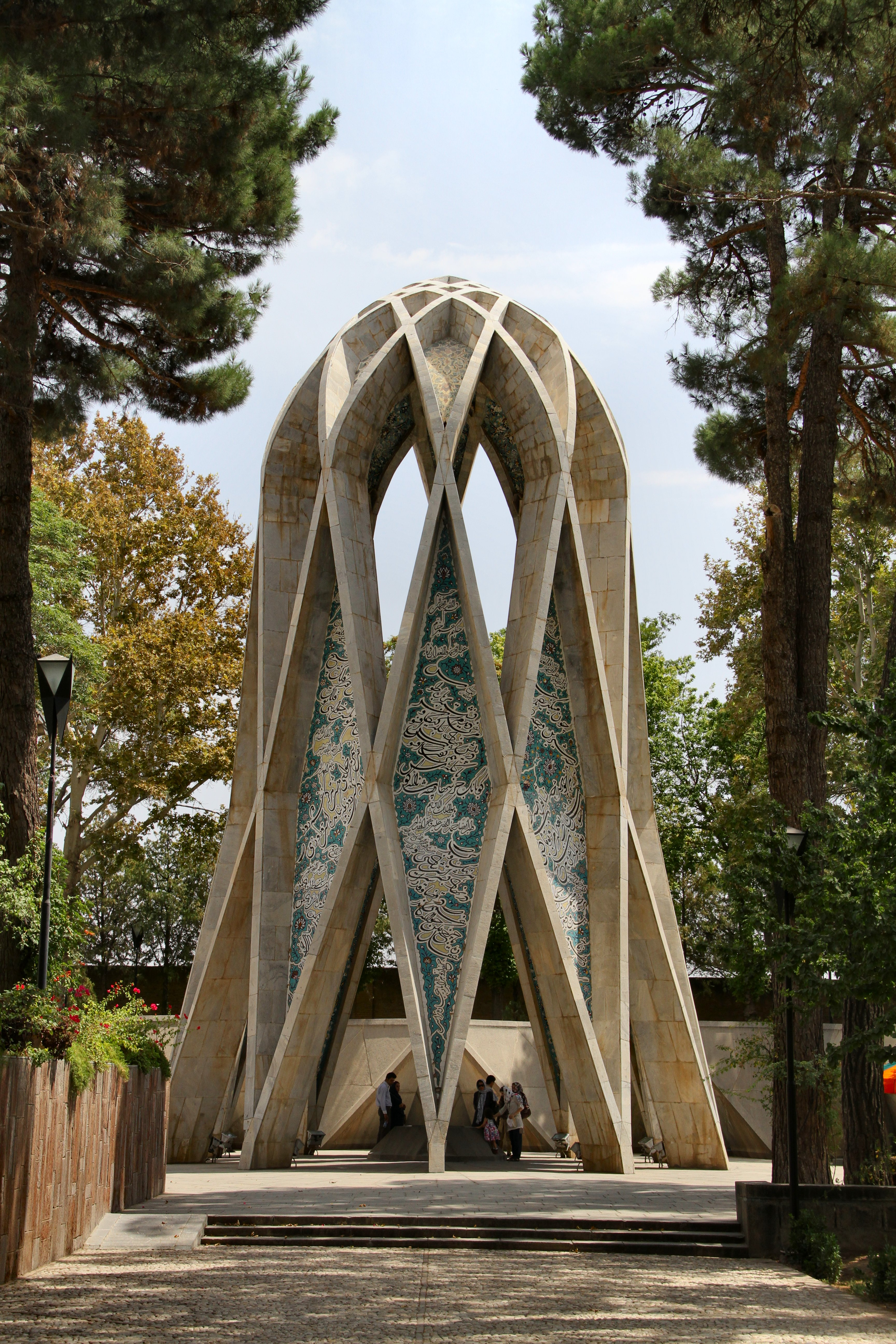
Mausoleum of Omar Khayyám in Nishapur

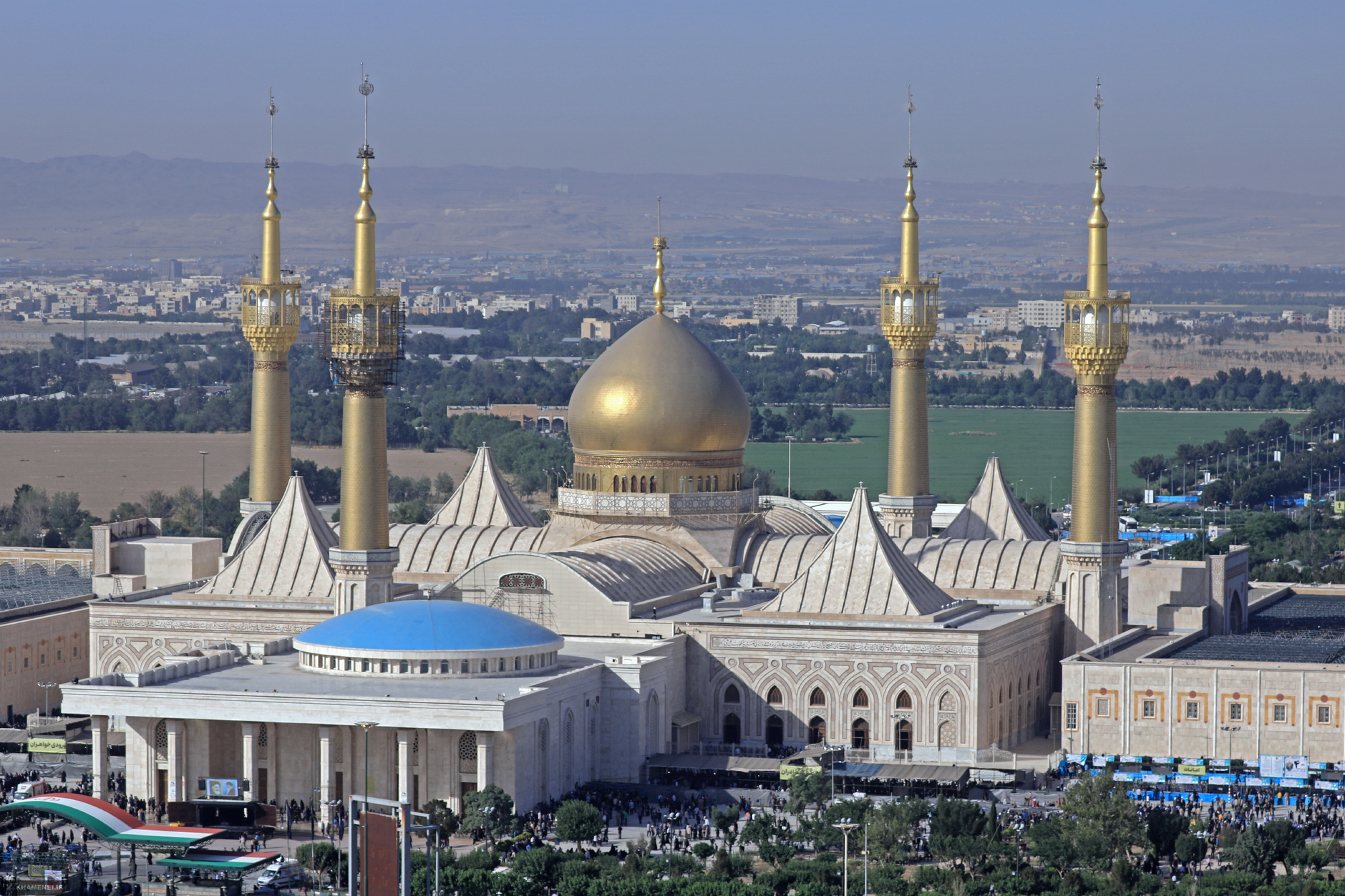
Mausoleum of Khomeini in Tehran, Iran

==== Iraq ====
- Imam Husayn Mosque, Karbala – according to Shī‘ah, sunni & sufi belief, the head and body of Husayn ibn Ali, along with all others who fell at the Battle of Karbala are buried there

==== Israel ====
- Shrine of the Báb in Haifa
- Shrine of Bahá'u'lláh in Acre

==== Jordan ====
- Al-Khazneh at Petra
- Mausoleum at Halicarnassus at Halicarnassus

==== Palestine ====
- Mausoleum of Yasser Arafat in Ramallah, West Bank

==== Turkey ====
- Anıtkabir mausoleum of Atatürk the founder of the Republic of Turkey at Ankara
- Celal Bayar Mausoleum in Bursa
- Adnan Menderes's Mausoleum, in Istanbul
- Turgut Özal's Mausoleum, in Istanbul
- Süleyman Demirel Mausoleum in Atabey

==== United Arab Emirates ====
- Sheikh Zayed Grand Mosque in Abu Dhabi

==== Gallery ====
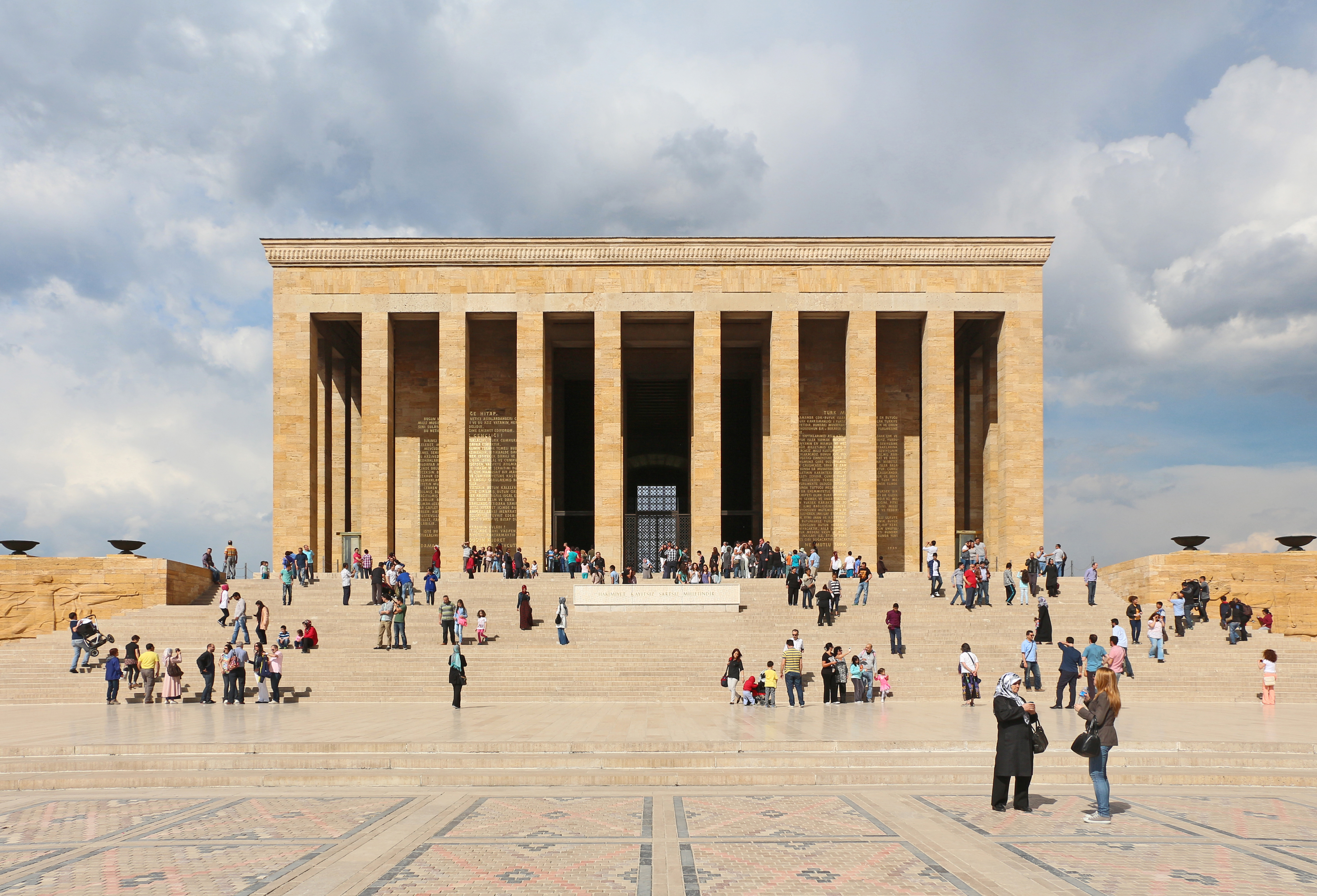
Anıtkabir, the mausoleum of Mustafa Kemal Atatürk in Ankara, Turkey

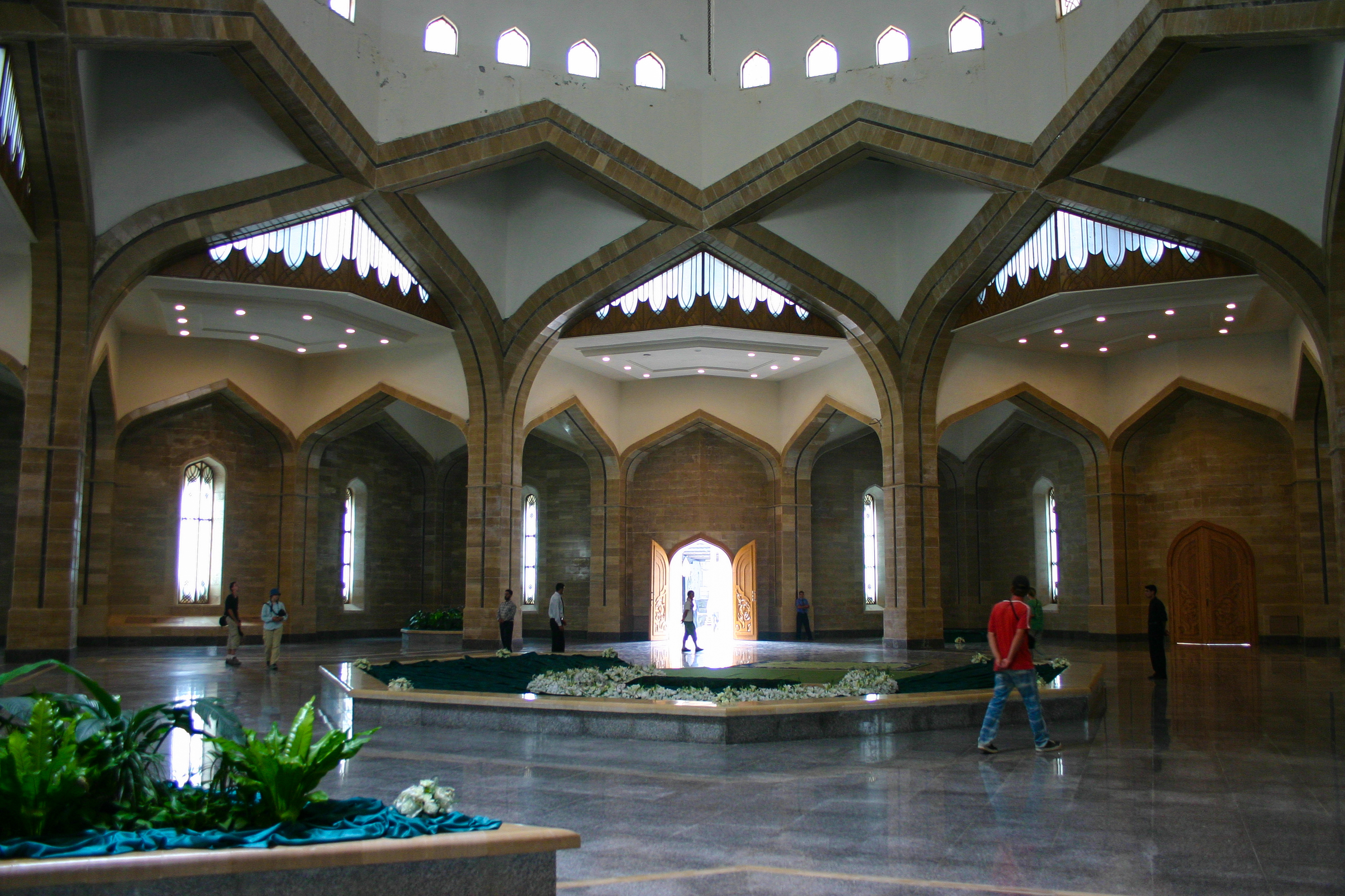
Mausoleum of the Assad family in Qardaha, Syria

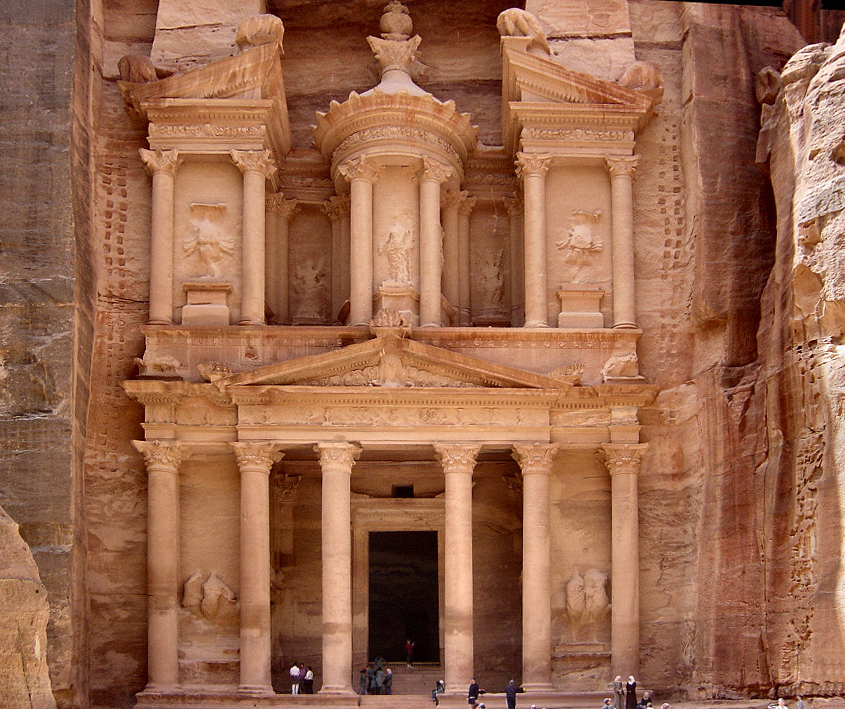
The Khazneh at Petra is believed to be Nabataean King Aretas IV's mausoleum.

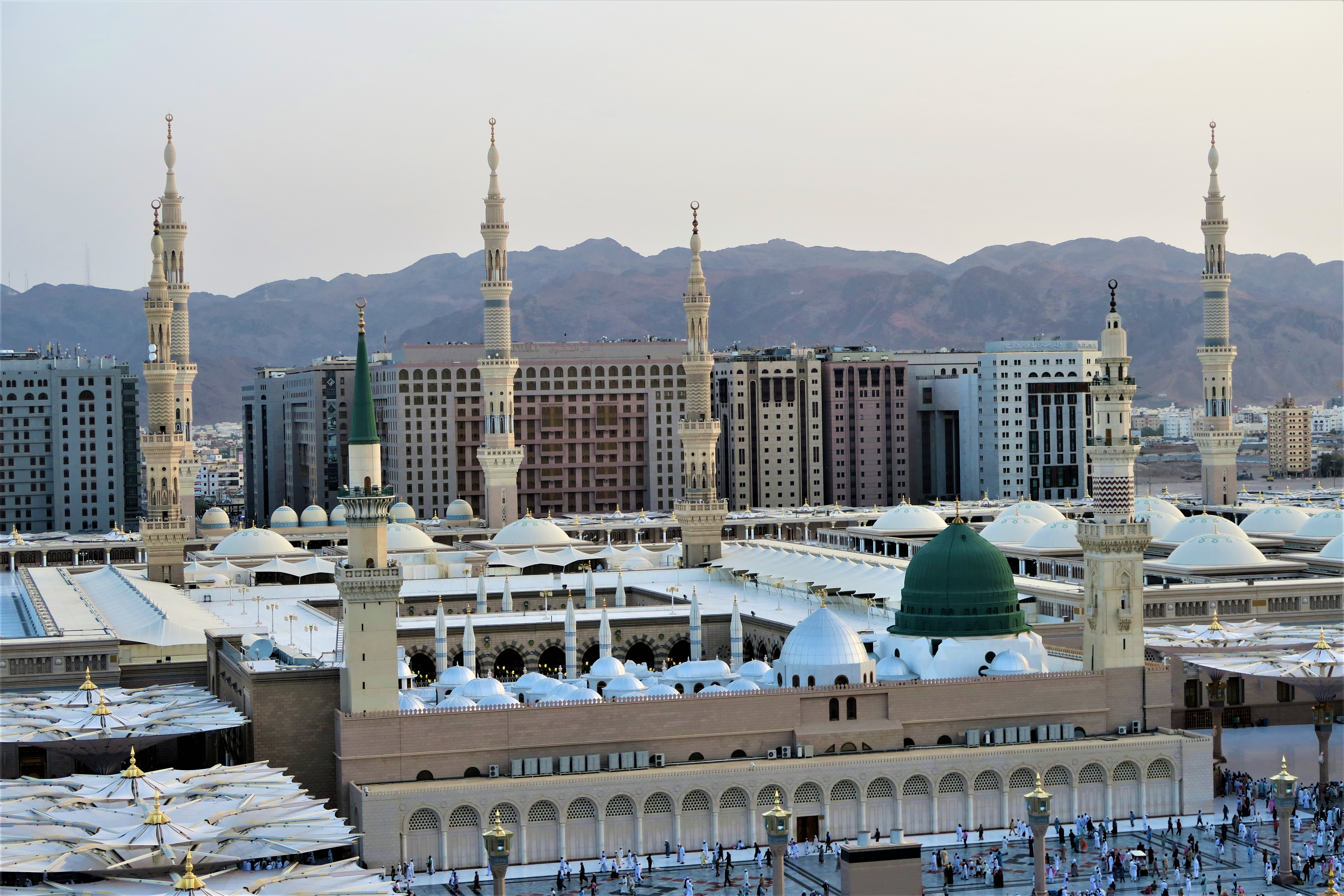
The Green Dome, mausoleum of Muhammad, Abu Bakr, and Omar I, located in the Prophet's Mosque in Medina, Saudi Arabia

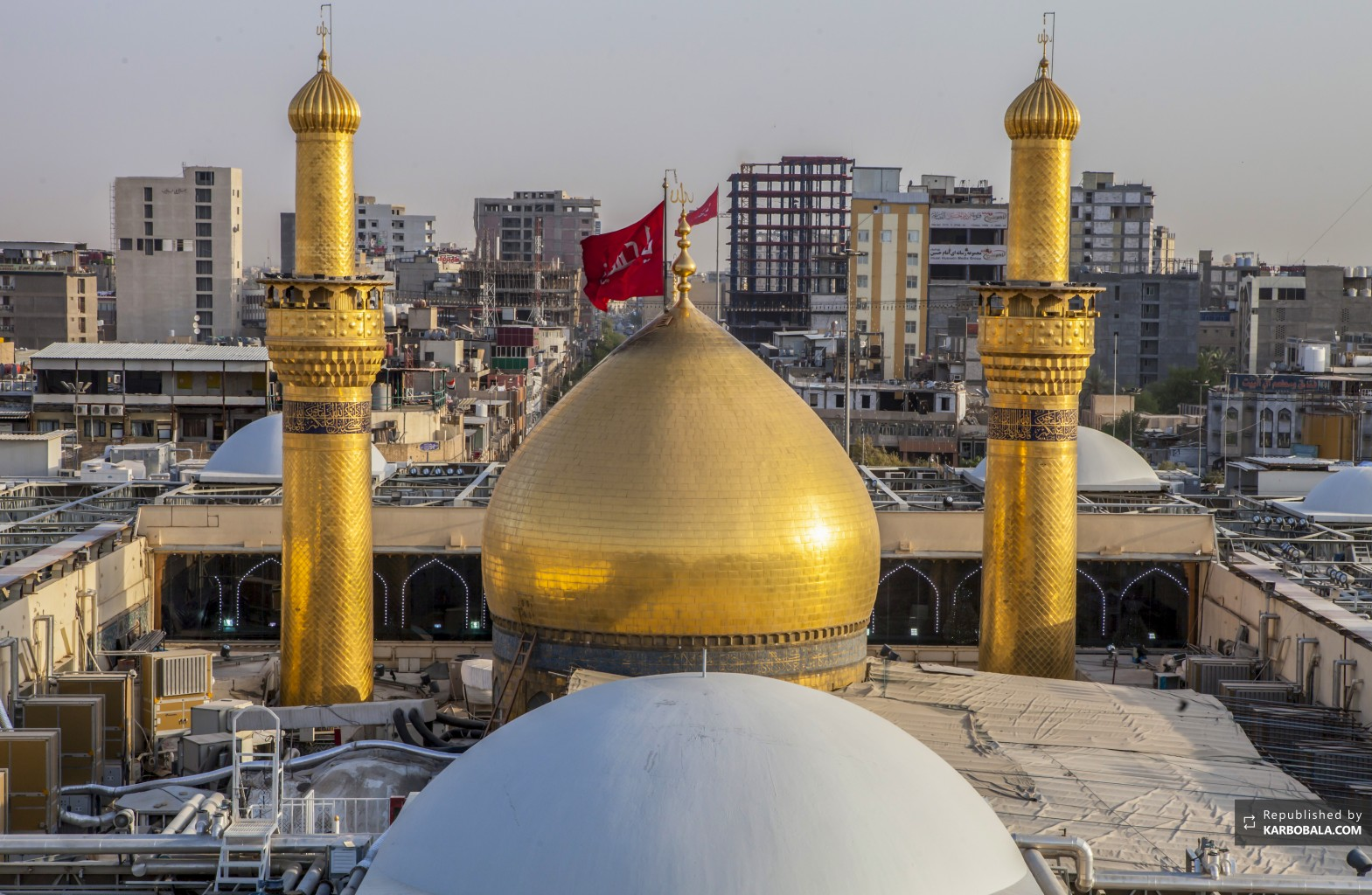
The mausoleum of Imam Husayn Shrine in Karbala, Iraq

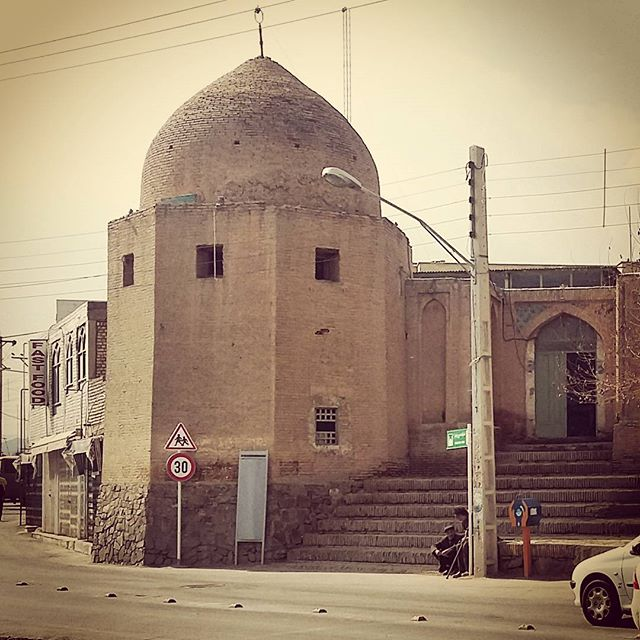
Mausoleum of later Abbasid Caliph Ar-Rashid bi-llāh

=== Europe ===
- Imperial Crypt in Austria
- Church of Our Lady of Laeken in Belgium
- Batenberg Mausoleum in Sofia, Bulgaria
- Cathedral of Saint Domnius in Split, Croatia
- Royal Mausoleum and the Duchess of Kent's Mausoleum, Frogmore, Windsor, England
- Trentham Mausoleum near Stoke-on-Trent, England
- Juselius Mausoleum in Finland
- Les Invalides in France
- Panthéon, Paris in France
- Bismarck Mausoleum outside Friedrichsruh in northern Germany
- Lajos Batthyány's Mausoleum in Budapest, Hungary
- Mausoleum of Augustus in Rome, Italy.
- Mausoleum of Hadrian in Rome, Italy
- Pantheon, Rome in Italy
- Mausoleum of Emperor Ferdinand II in Austria
- Mausoleum of Theodoric in Ravenna, Italy
- Mausoleum of Galla Placidia in Ravenna, Italy
- Wilhelm II Mausoleum in Doorn, Netherlands
- National Pantheon / Church of Santa Engrácia in Lisbon, Portugal
- Mausoleum of Marasesti in Marasesti, Romania
- Peter and Paul Cathedral in St. Petersburg, Russia
- Cathedral of the Archangel in Moscow, Russia
- Lenin's Mausoleum in Moscow, Russia
- Hamilton Mausoleum at Hamilton, Scotland
- Damat Ali-Pasha Mausoleum, Belgrade, Serbia
- House of Flowers in Belgrade, Serbia
- House of Karađorđević Mausoleum, St. George's Church, Oplenac in Topola, Serbia
- Valle de los Caídos in San Lorenzo de El Escorial, Spain
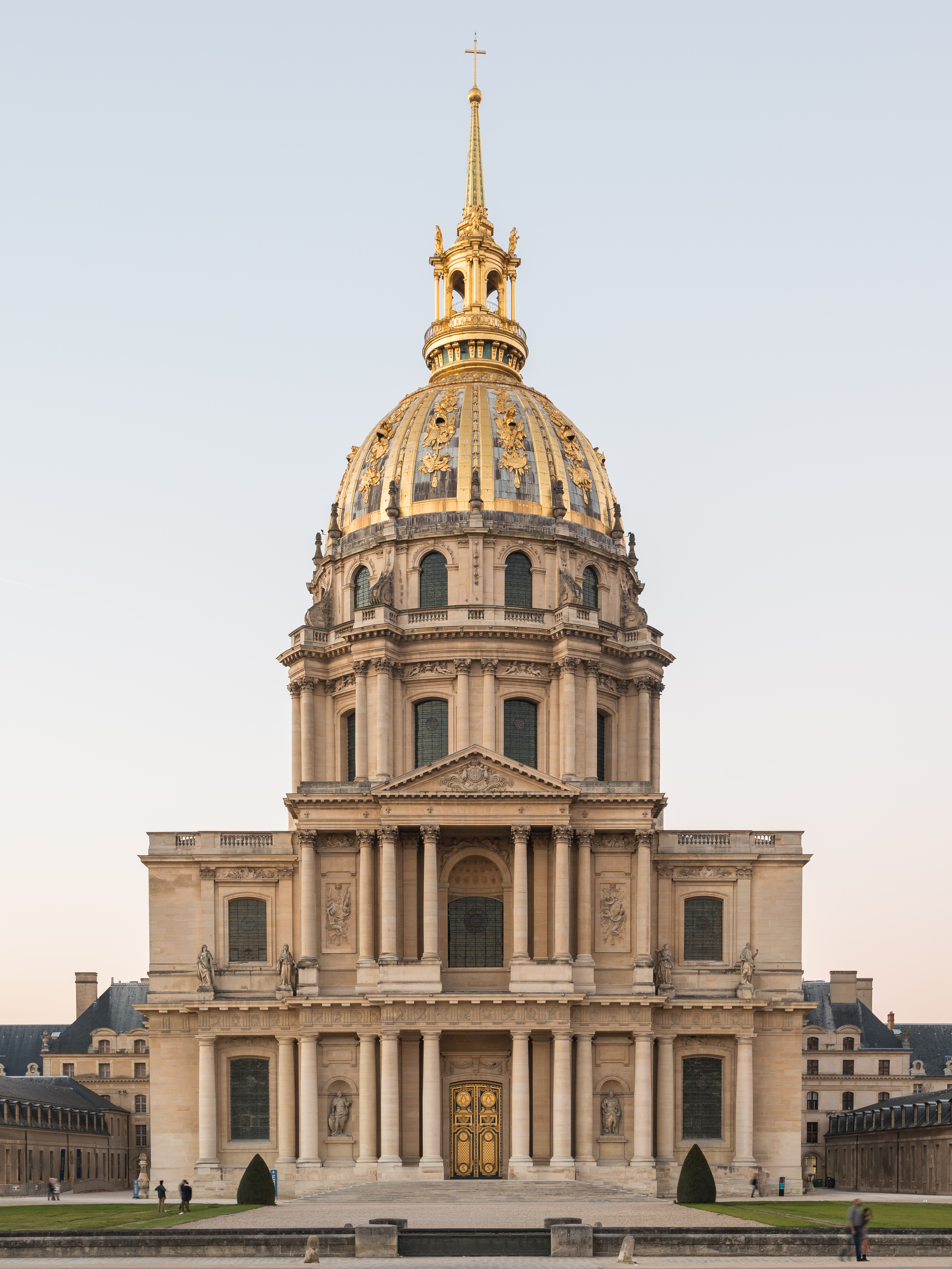
Les Invalides in Paris, France

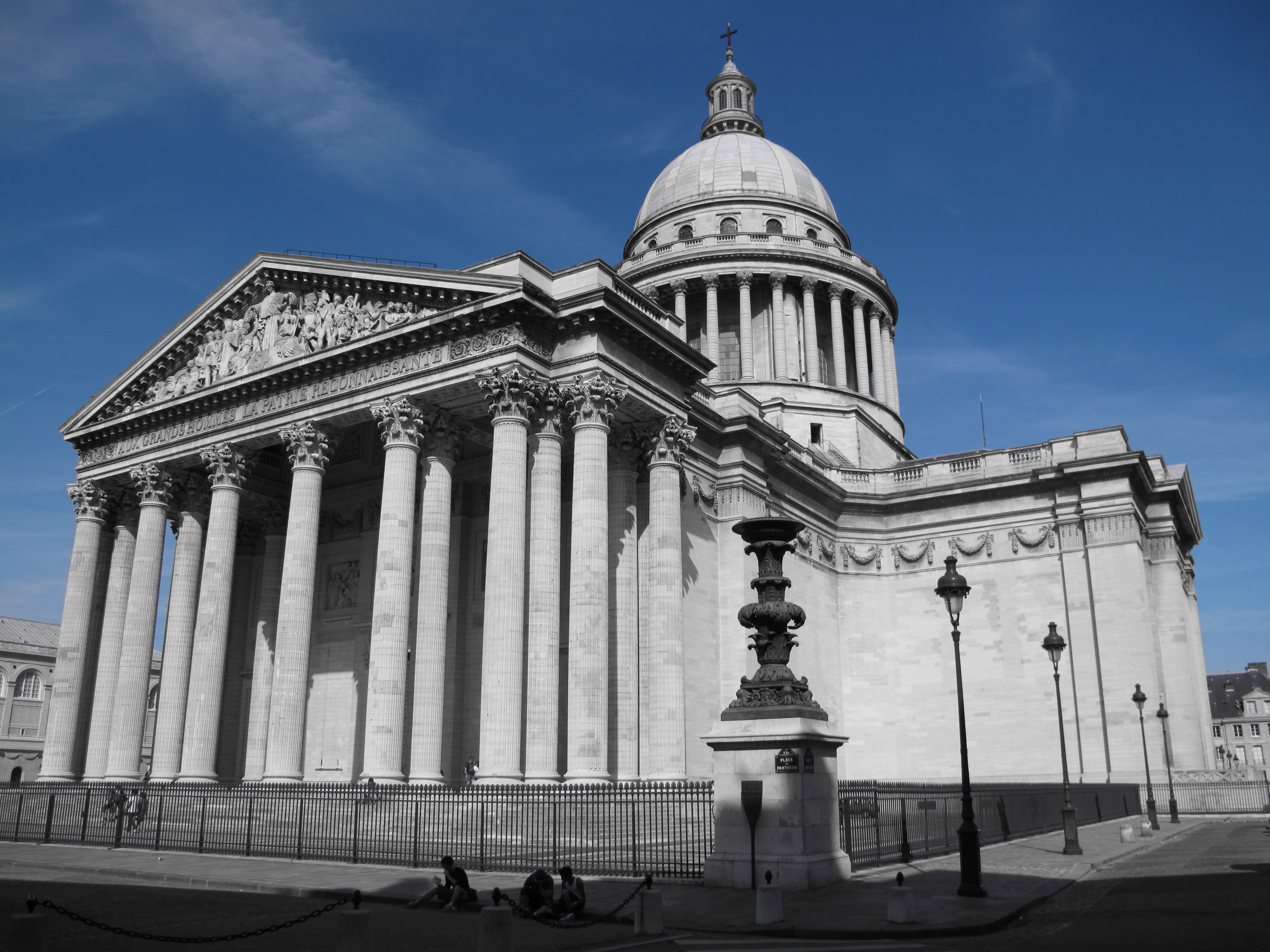
The Panthéon in Paris, France

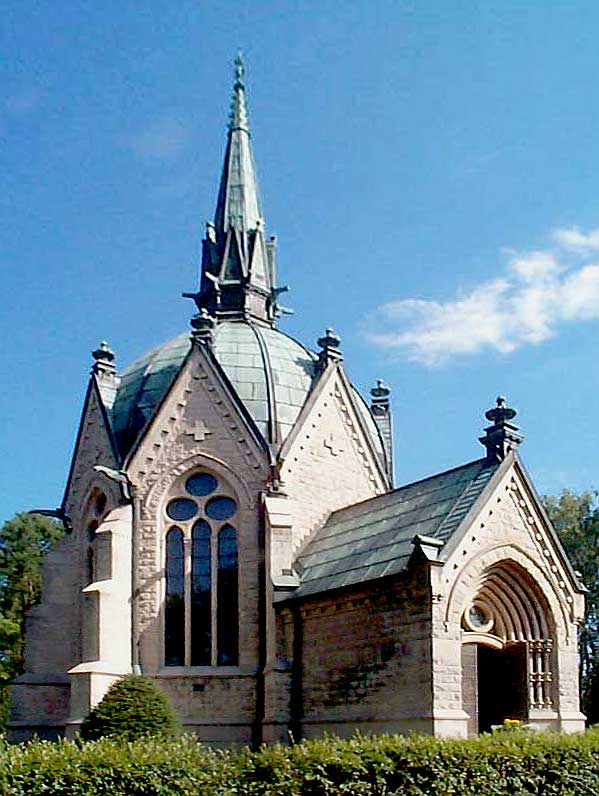
Jusélius Mausoleum at the Käppärä Cemetery in Pori, Finland

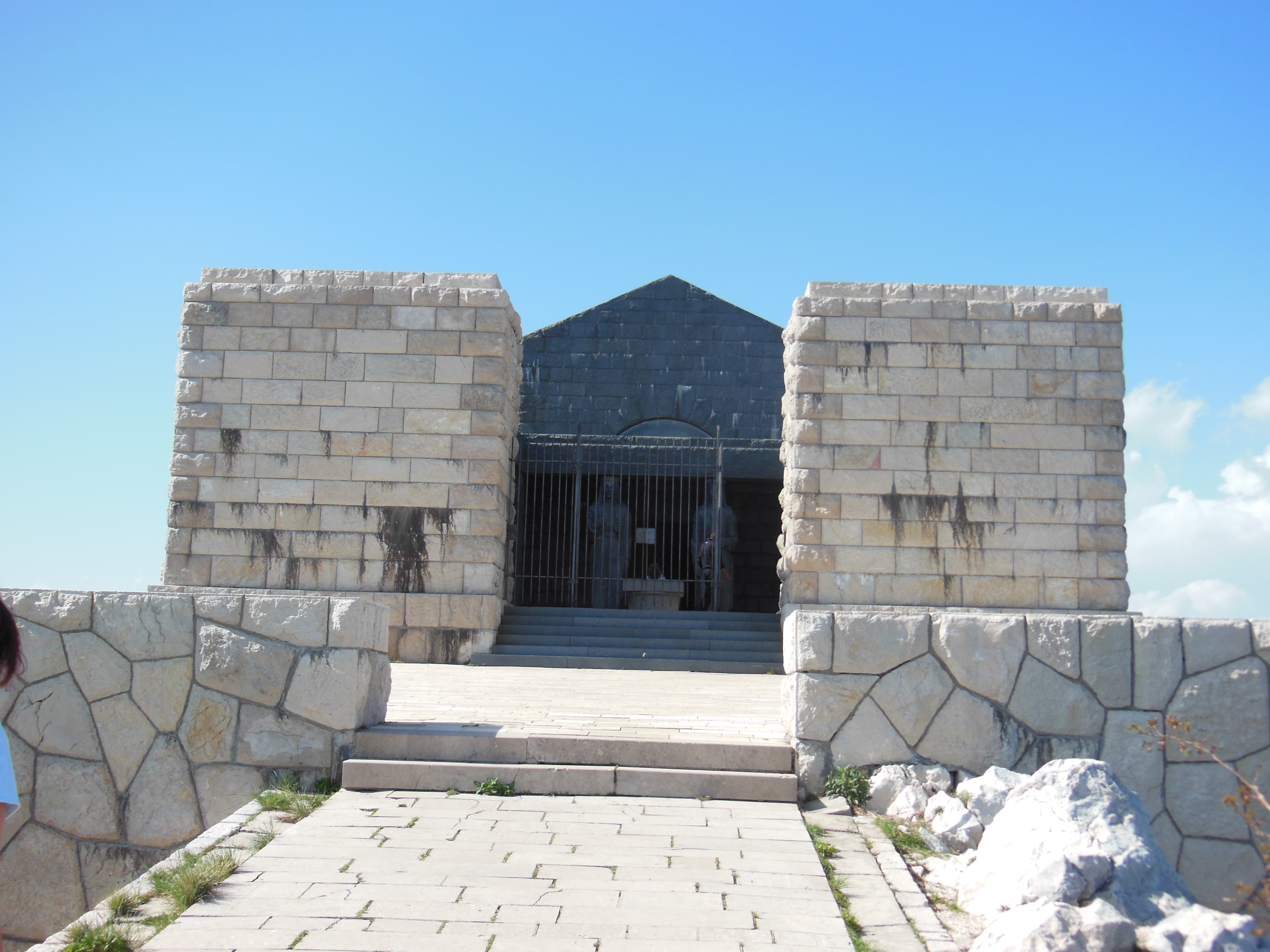
Mausoleum of Njegoš in Lovćen, Montenegro

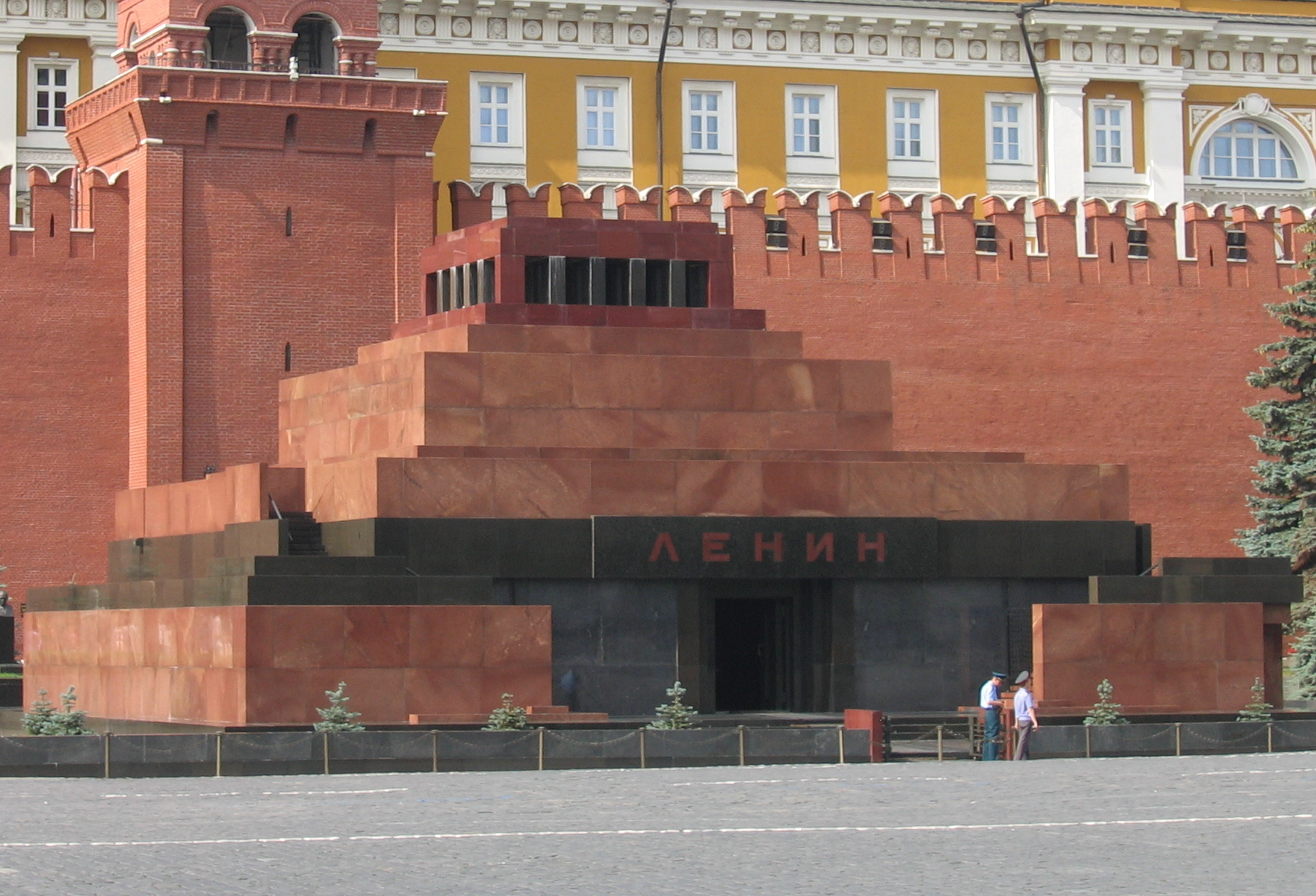
Lenin's Mausoleum in Moscow, Russia

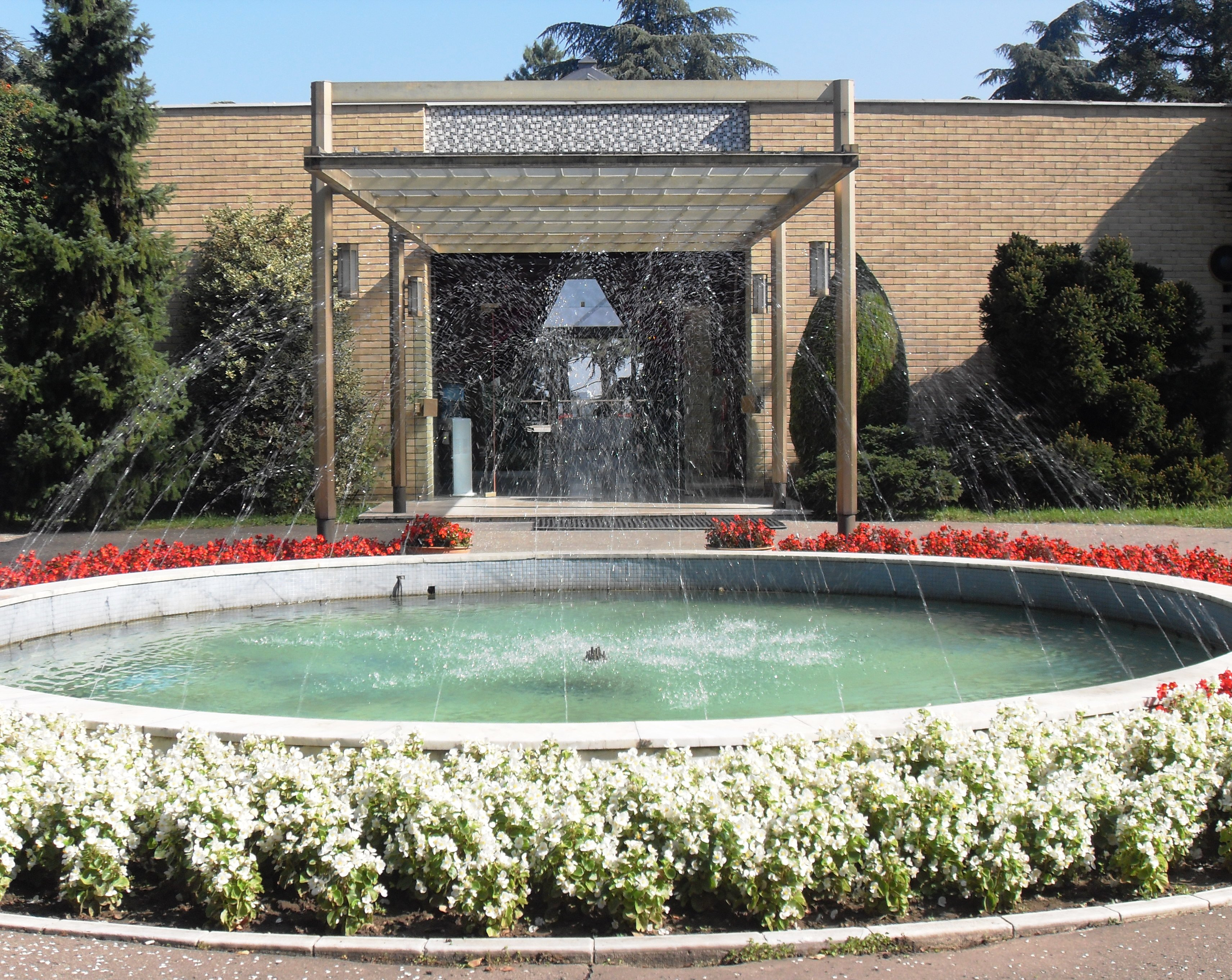
House of Flowers in Belgrade, Serbia

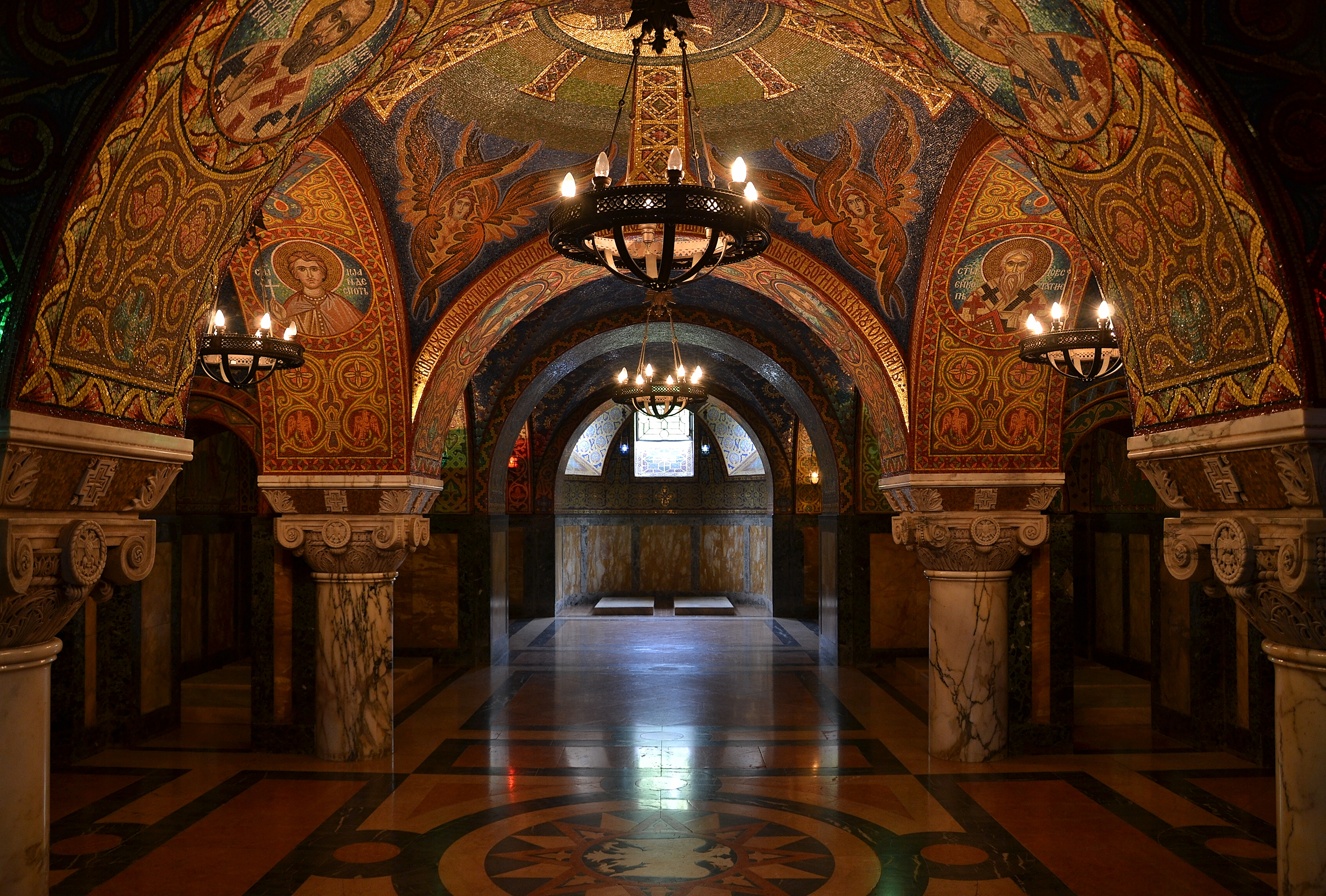
Oplenac in Topola, Serbia

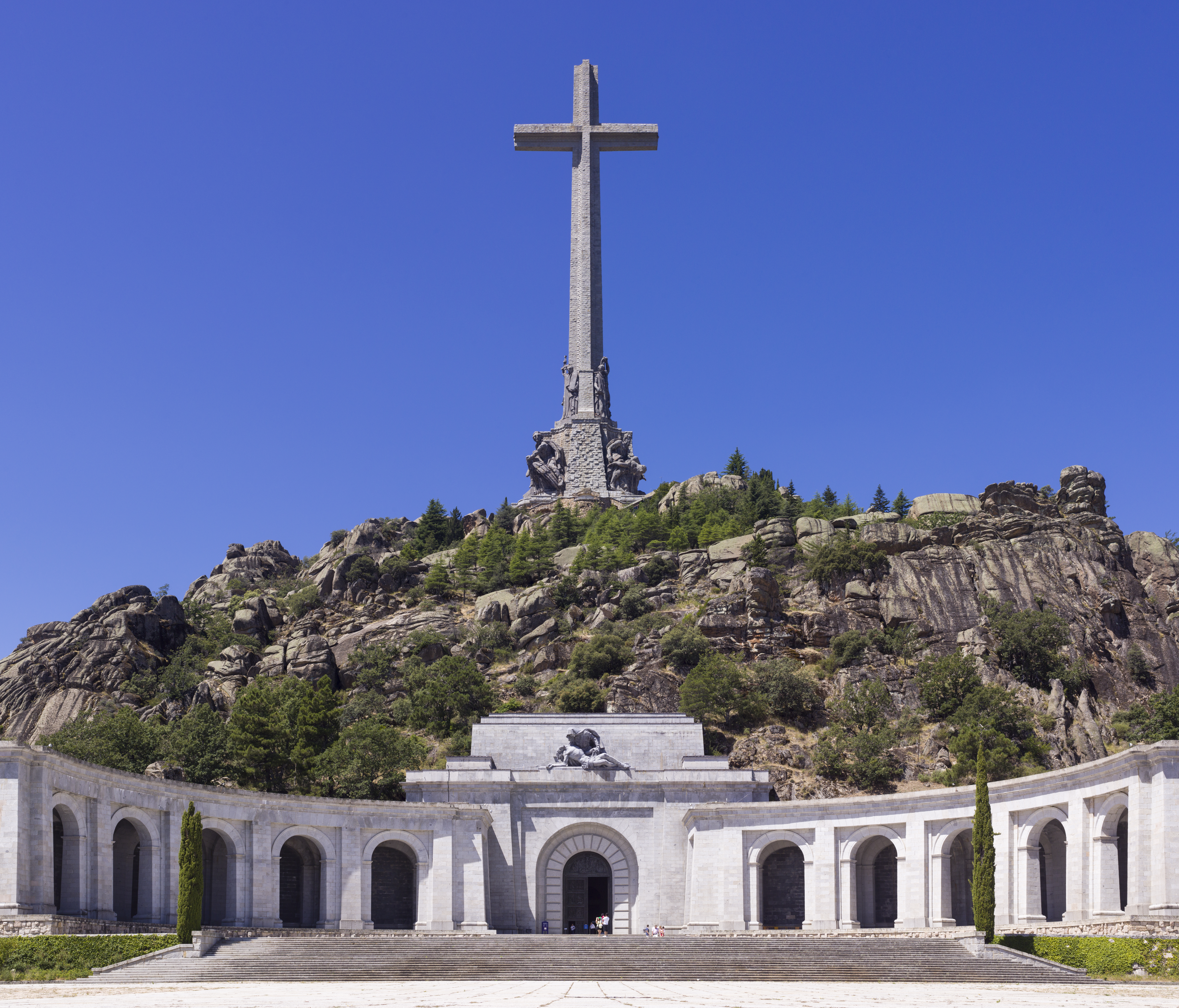
Valle de los Caídos in San Lorenzo de El Escorial, Spain

=== South America ===
==== Argentina ====
- La Recoleta Cemetery, Buenos Aires
- Buenos Aires Metropolitan Cathedral, mausoleum of José de San Martín
- Mausoleum of Néstor Kirchner, Río Gallegos, Santa Cruz
- Cathedral of La Plata, mausoleum of Dardo Rocha
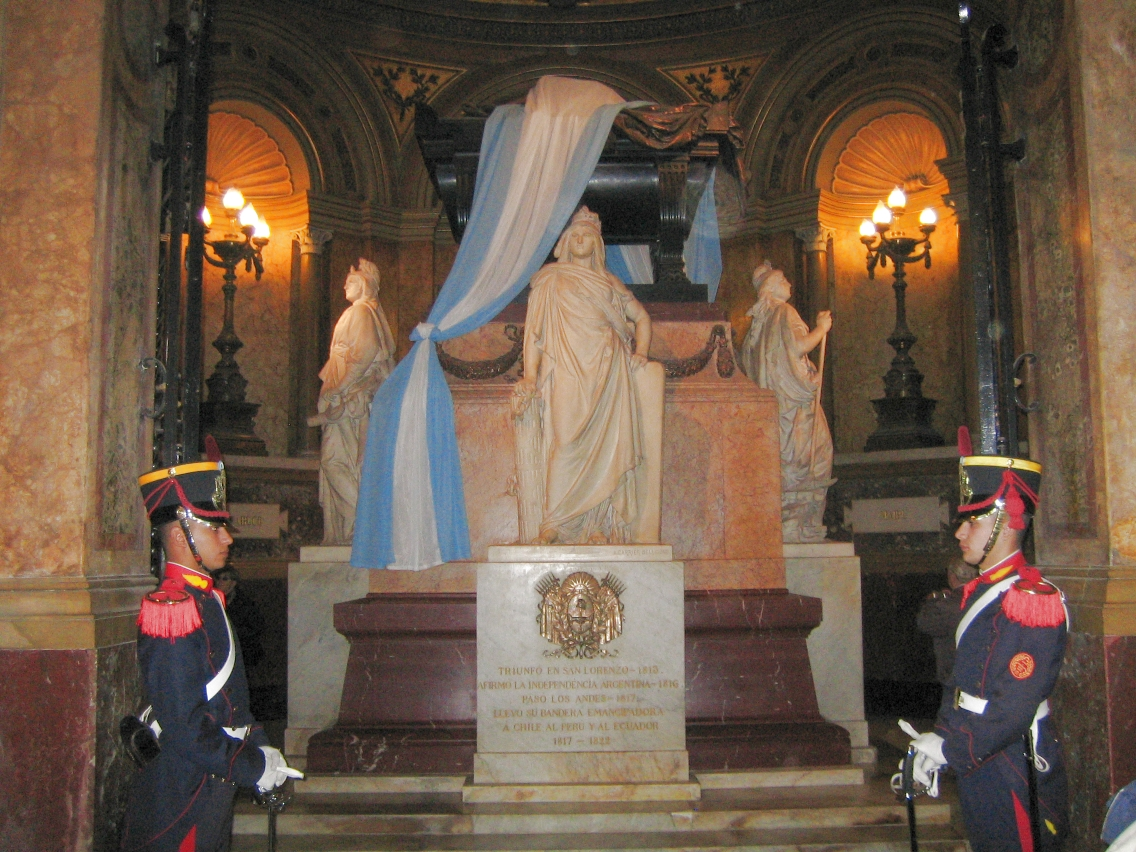
Buenos Aires Metropolitan Cathedral, mausoleum of General San Martín in Buenos Aires, Argentina

==== Bolivia ====
- Cathedral Basilica of Our Lady of Peace, La Paz, mausoleum of Andrés de Santa Cruz
- Cementerio General de Cochabamba, mausoleum of "general del pueblo" René Barrientos Ortuño
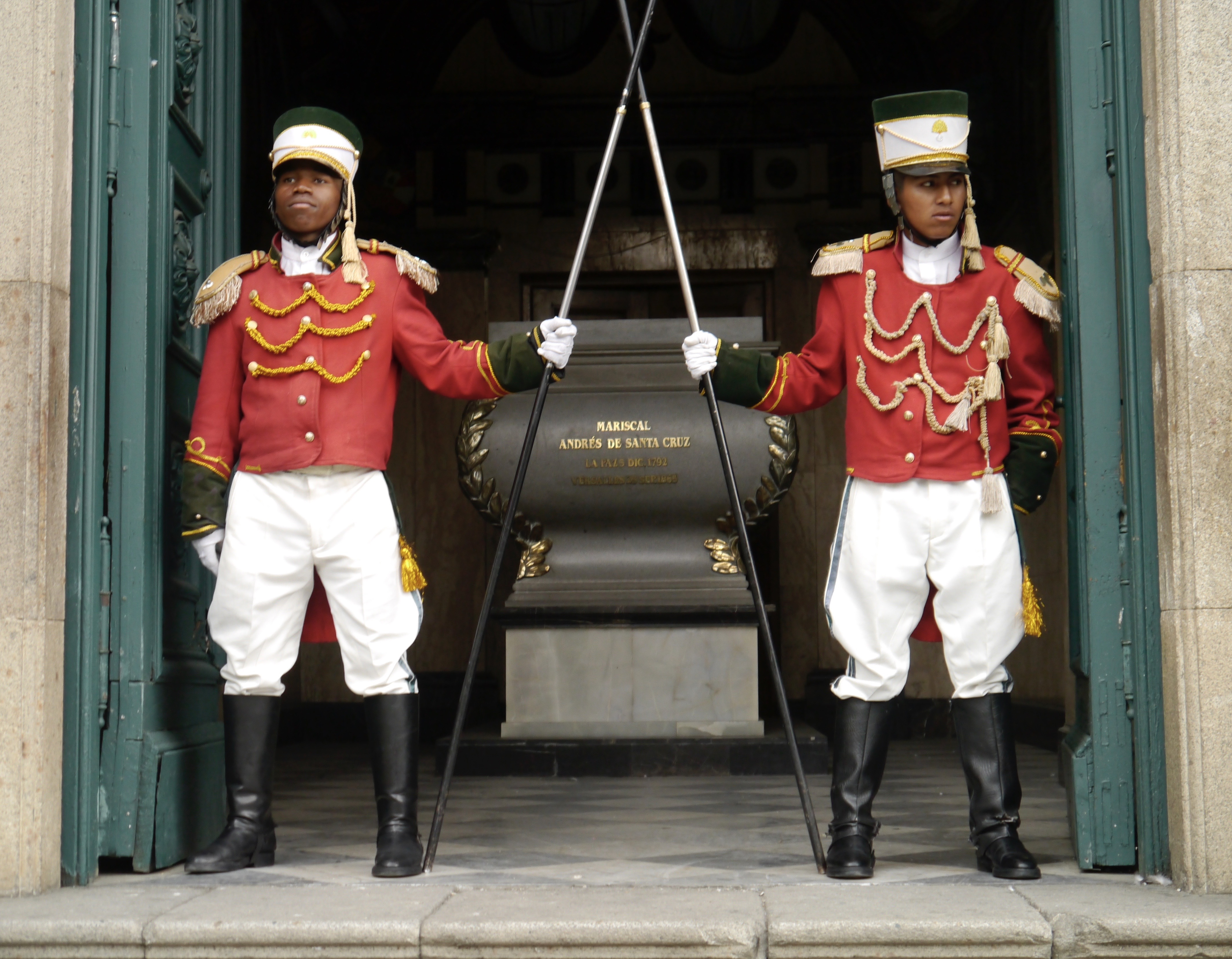
Cathedral Basilica of Our Lady of Peace, La Paz, mausoleum of Andrés de Santa Cruz, Bolivia

==== Brazil ====
- Obelisk of São Paulo, mausoleum to the heroes of the Constitutionalist Revolution in São Paulo, São Paulo
- Chico Xavier mausoleum in Uberaba, Minas Gerais
- São João Batista Cemetery, Rio de Janeiro, Rio de Janeiro
- Monument to the Independence of Brazil in São Paulo
- JK Memorial in Brasília, Federal District
- Monument to the dead of World War II, Rio de Janeiro
- Imperial Mausoleum, the final resting place of Emperor Pedro II of Brazil and other members of the Brazilian imperial family
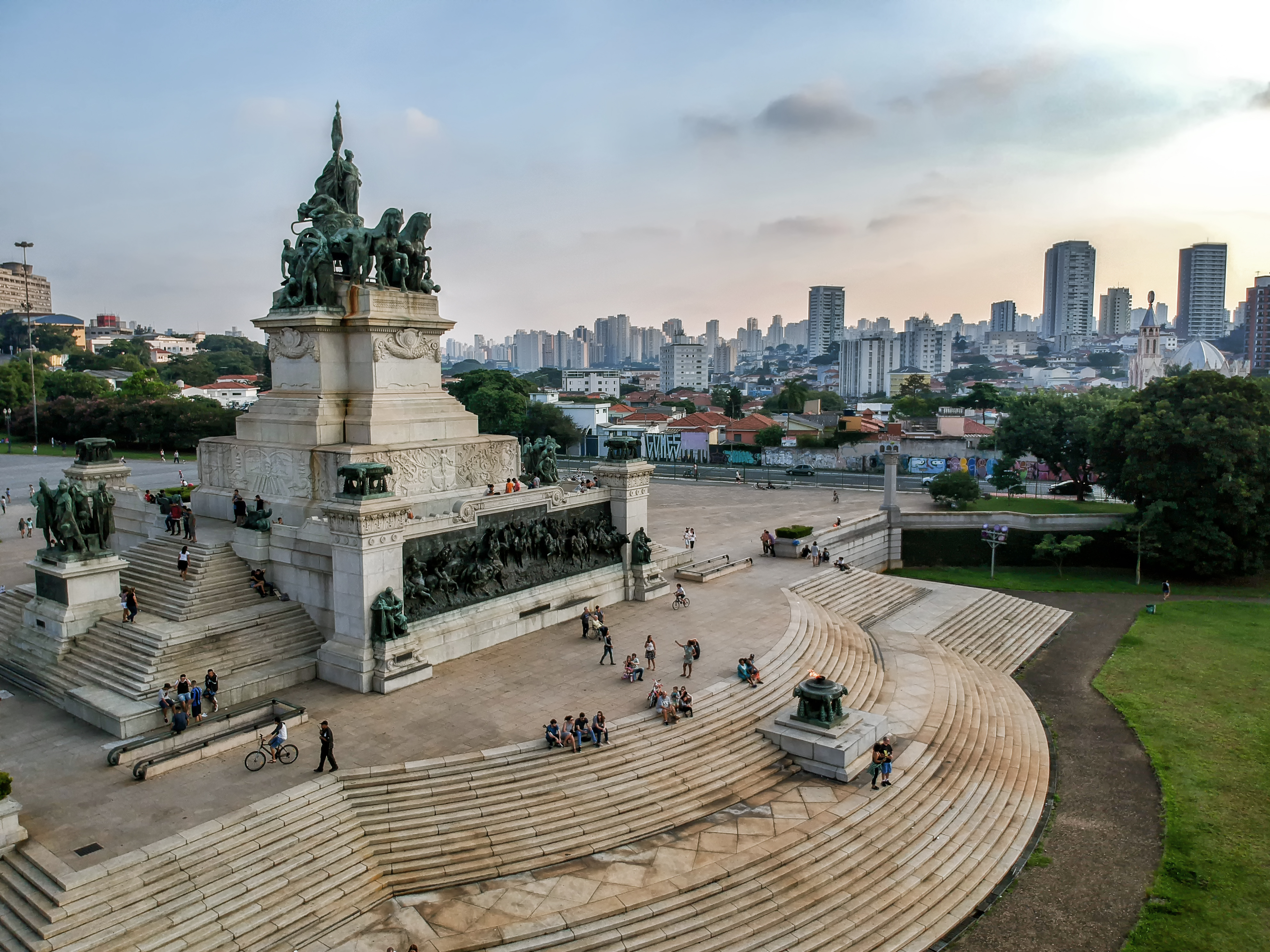
The Monument to the Independence of Brazil in São Paulo houses the sarcophagi of Emperor Pedro I of Brazil (also King of Portugal as Pedro IV) and his two wives

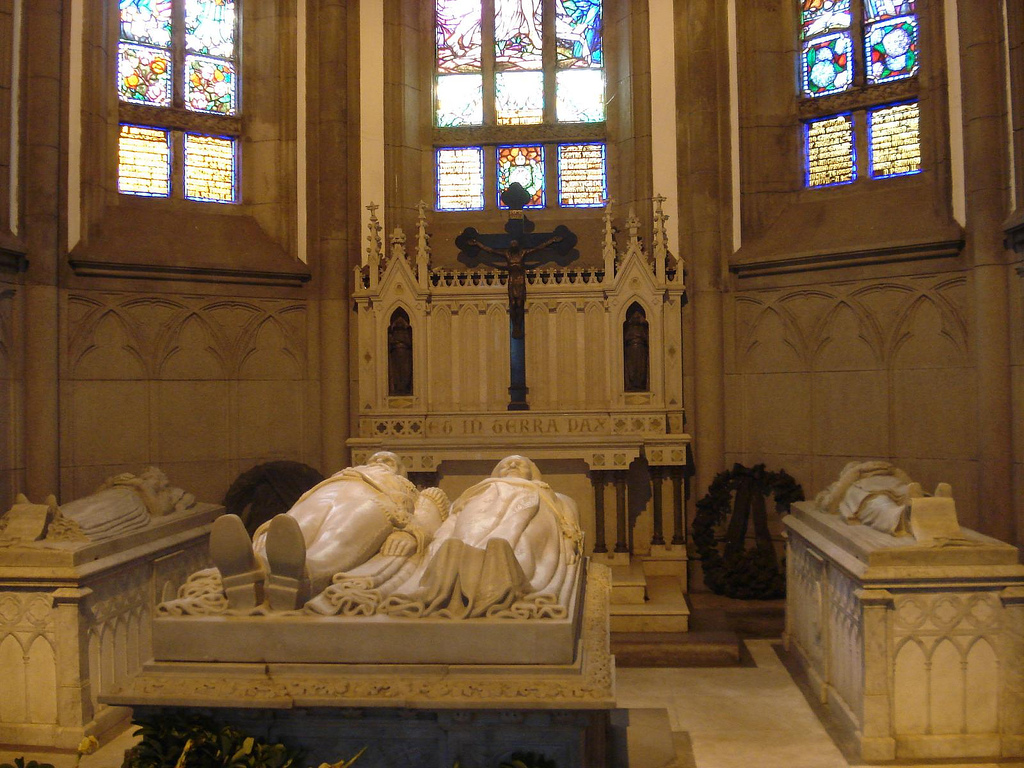
The Imperial Mausoleum in the Cathedral of São Pedro de Alcântara in Petrópolis, Brazil. It is the final resting place of Emperor Pedro II of Brazil and other members of the Brazilian imperial family

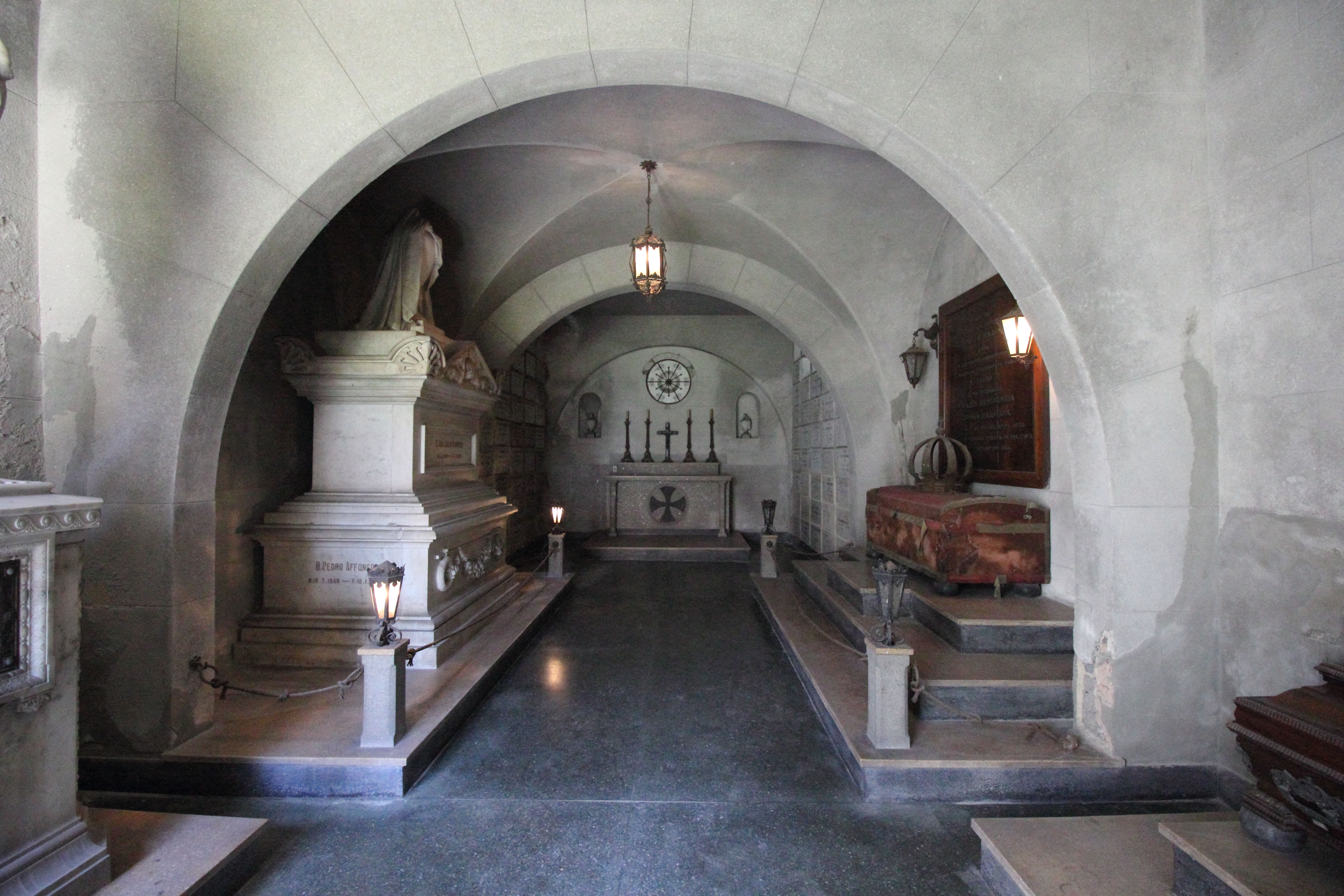
A mausoleum containing the remains of several Brazilian royals, as well as those of Franciscan friars, in the Convent of Santo Antônio, Rio de Janeiro

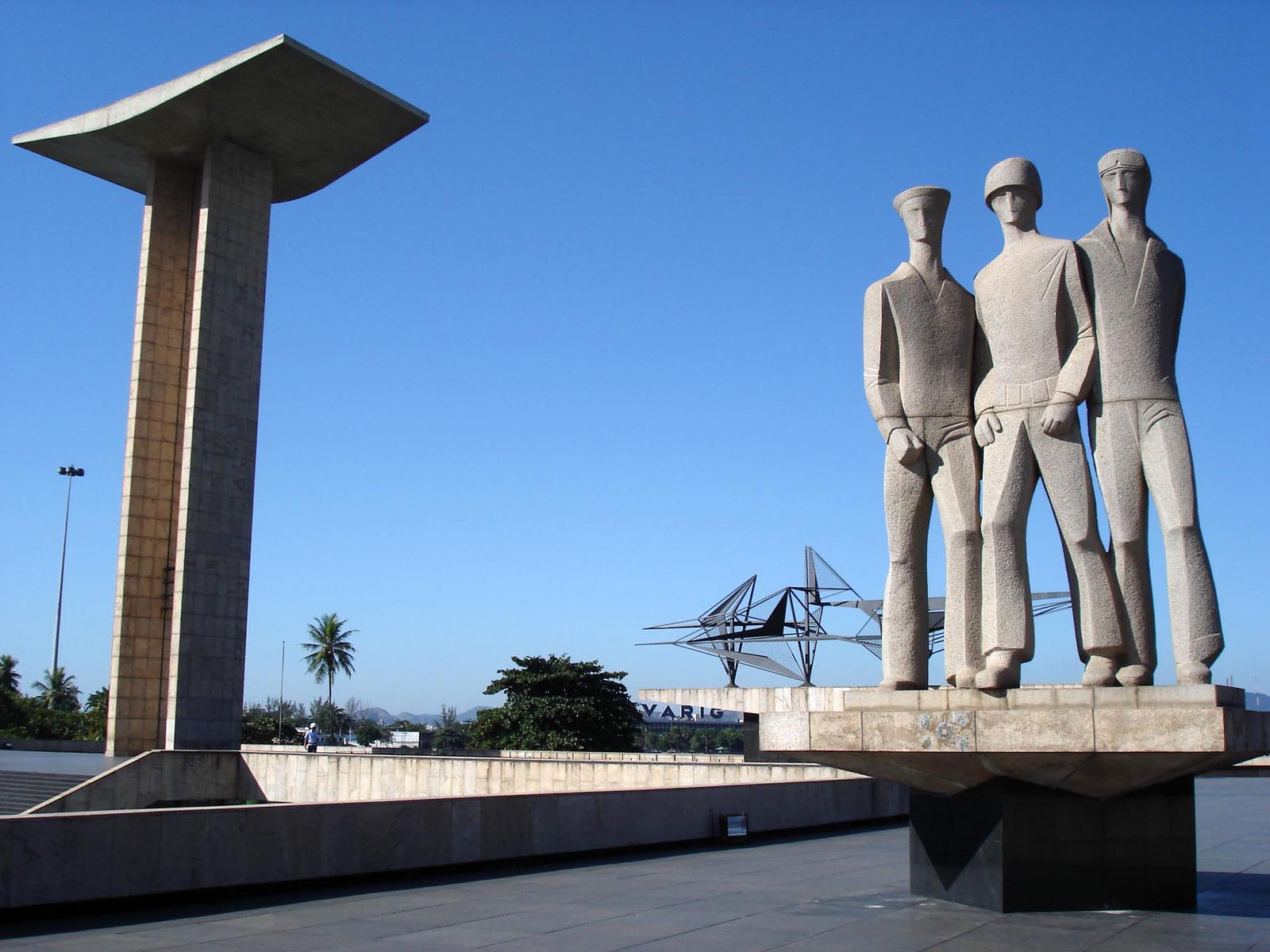
The Monument to the dead of World War II in Rio de Janeiro. The below grade mausoleum holds the remains of 467 servicemen of the Brazilian Expeditionary Force who died in action in Italy during World War II

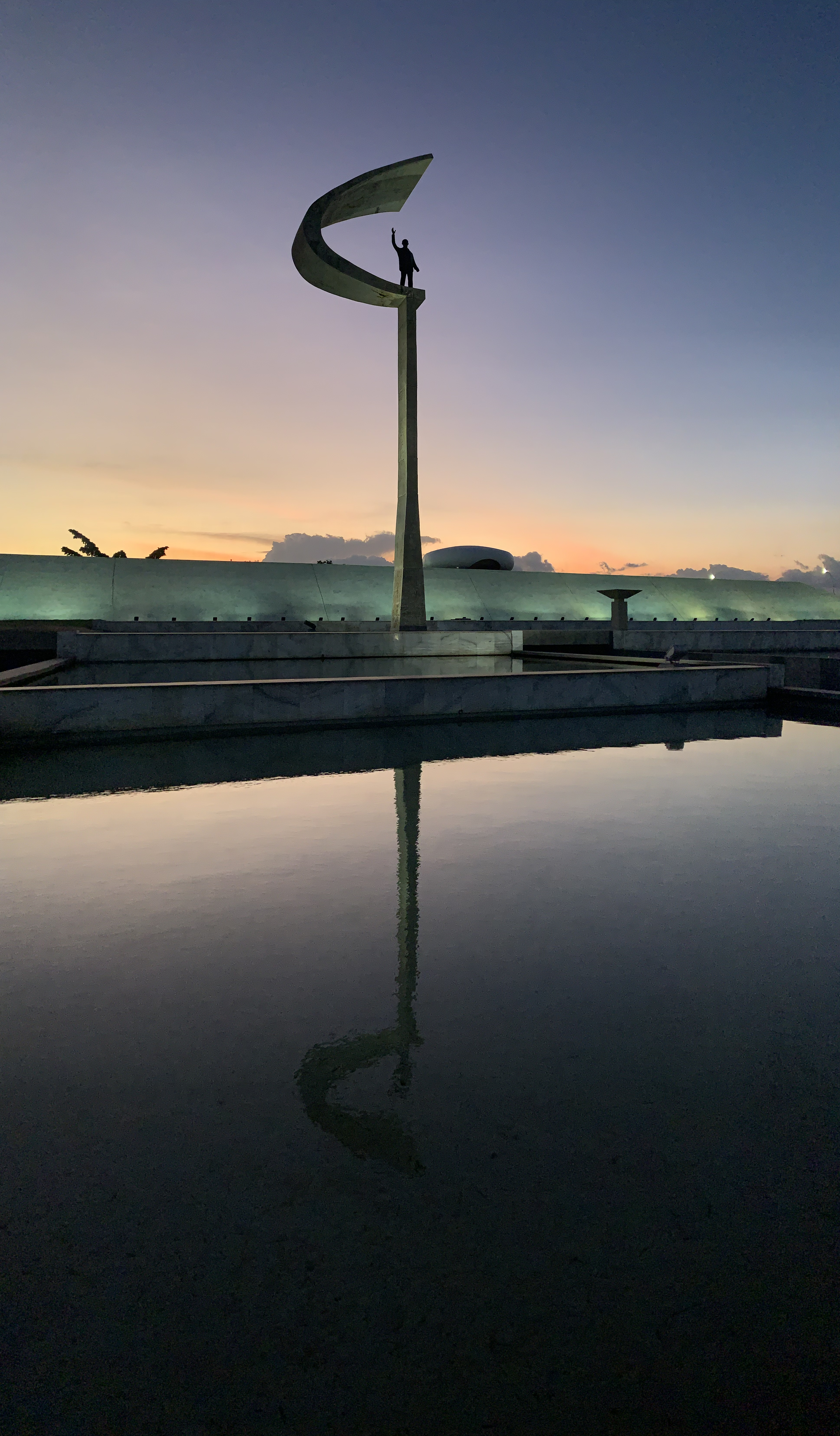
The JK Memorial is the burial place of Brazilian president Juscelino Kubitschek in Brasília, a city founded by Kubitschek himself

==== Chile ====
- Altar de la Patria of Chile
- Cementerio General de Santiago, Chile
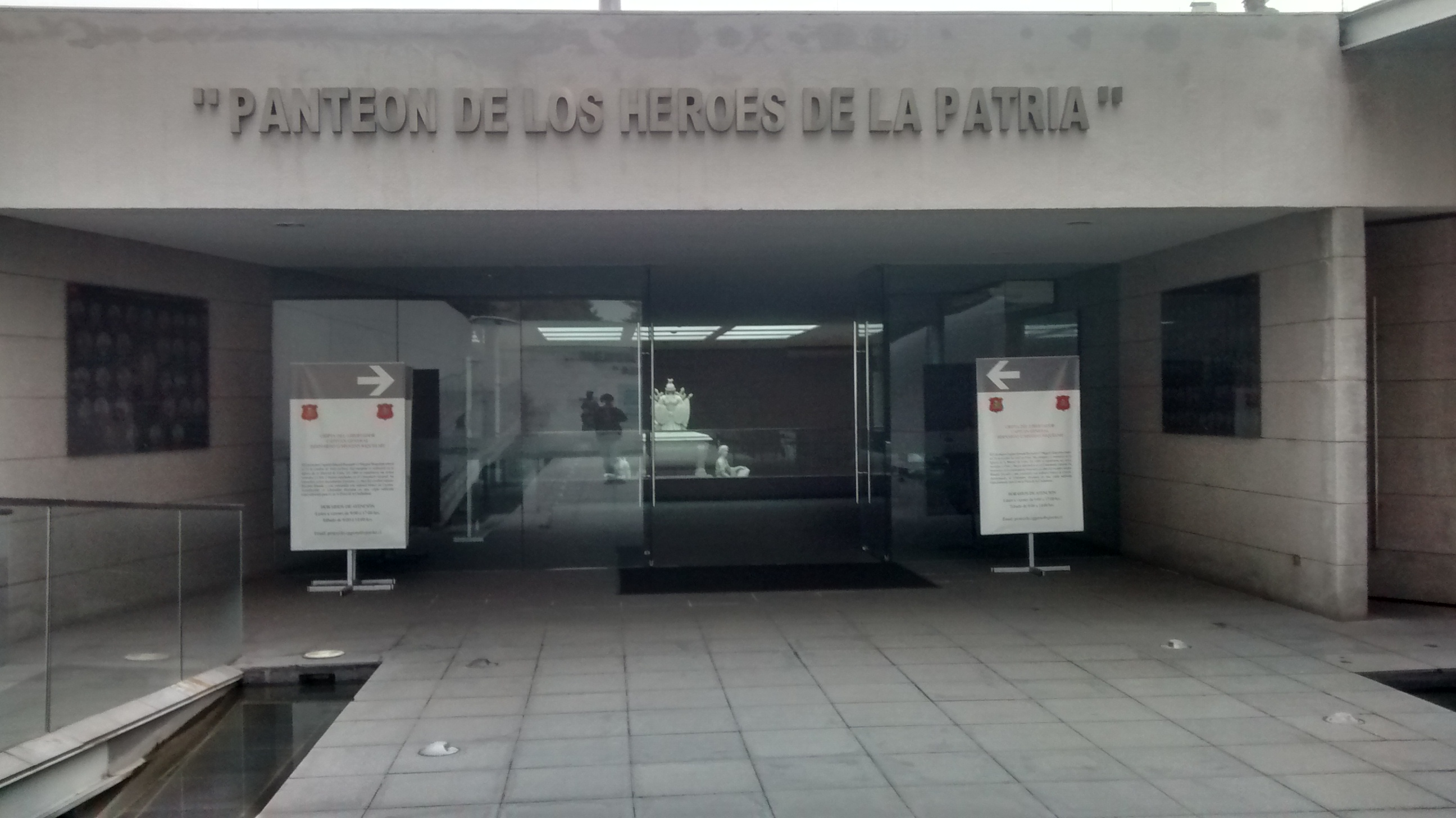
Altar de la Patria of Chile

==== Colombia ====
- Central Cemetery of Bogotá, Colombia

==== Ecuador ====
- San Diego Cemetery, Quito
- Cathedral of Quito

==== Paraguay ====
- National Pantheon of the Heroes
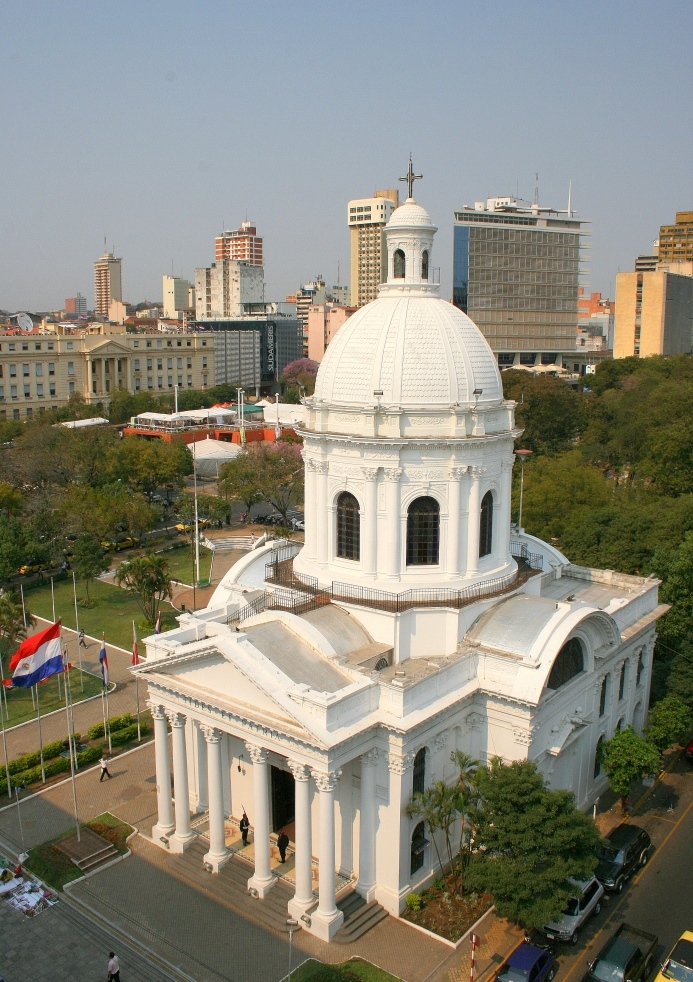
National Pantheon of the Heroes in Asunción, Paraguay

==== Peru ====
- Panteón de los Próceres
- Presbítero Maestro, mausoleum and museum in Lima
- Metropolitan Cathedral of Lima
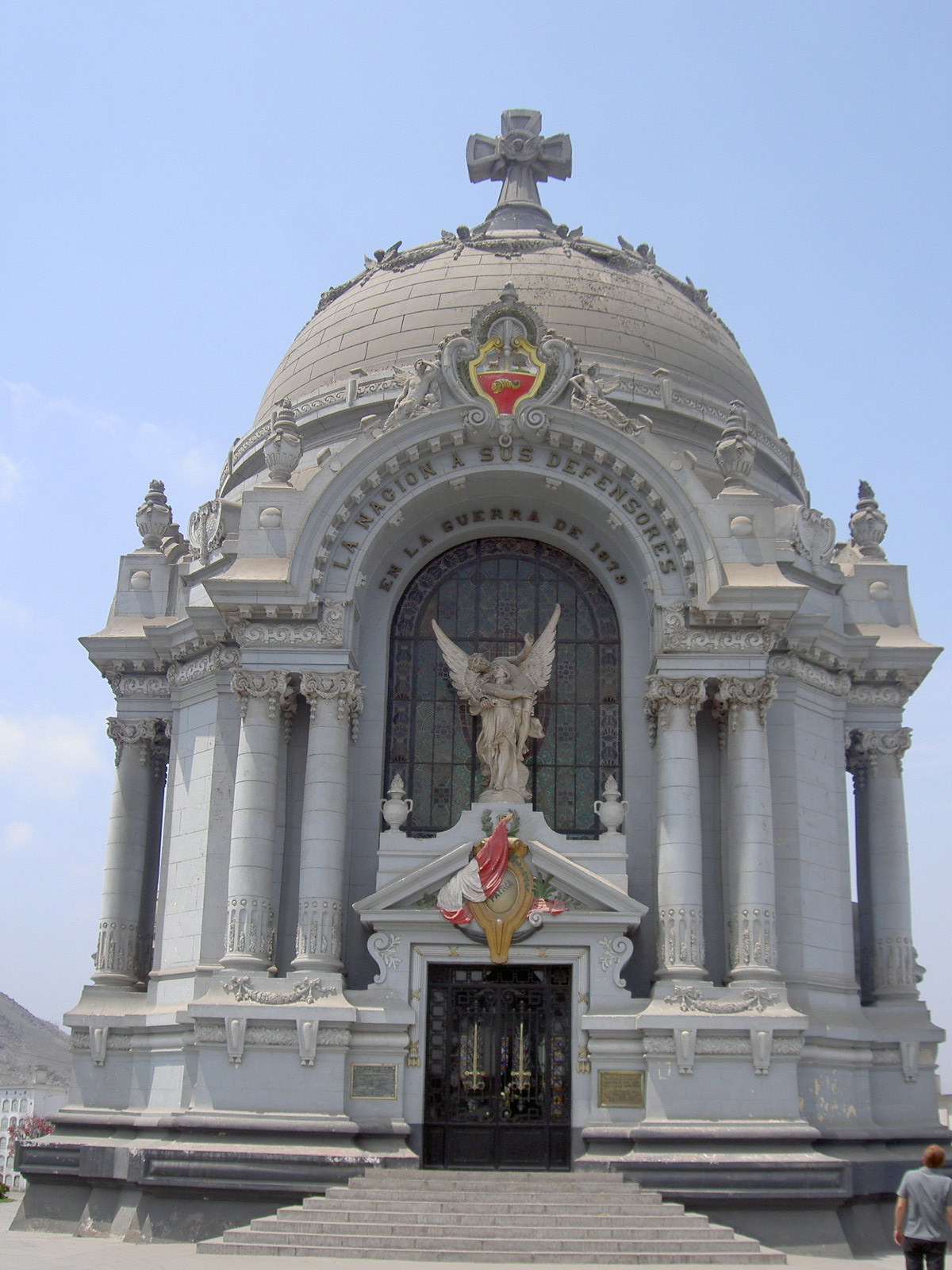
Presbitero Maestro mausoleum and museum in Lima, Peru

==== Uruguay ====
- Artigas Mausoleum, mausoleum of José Gervasio Artigas
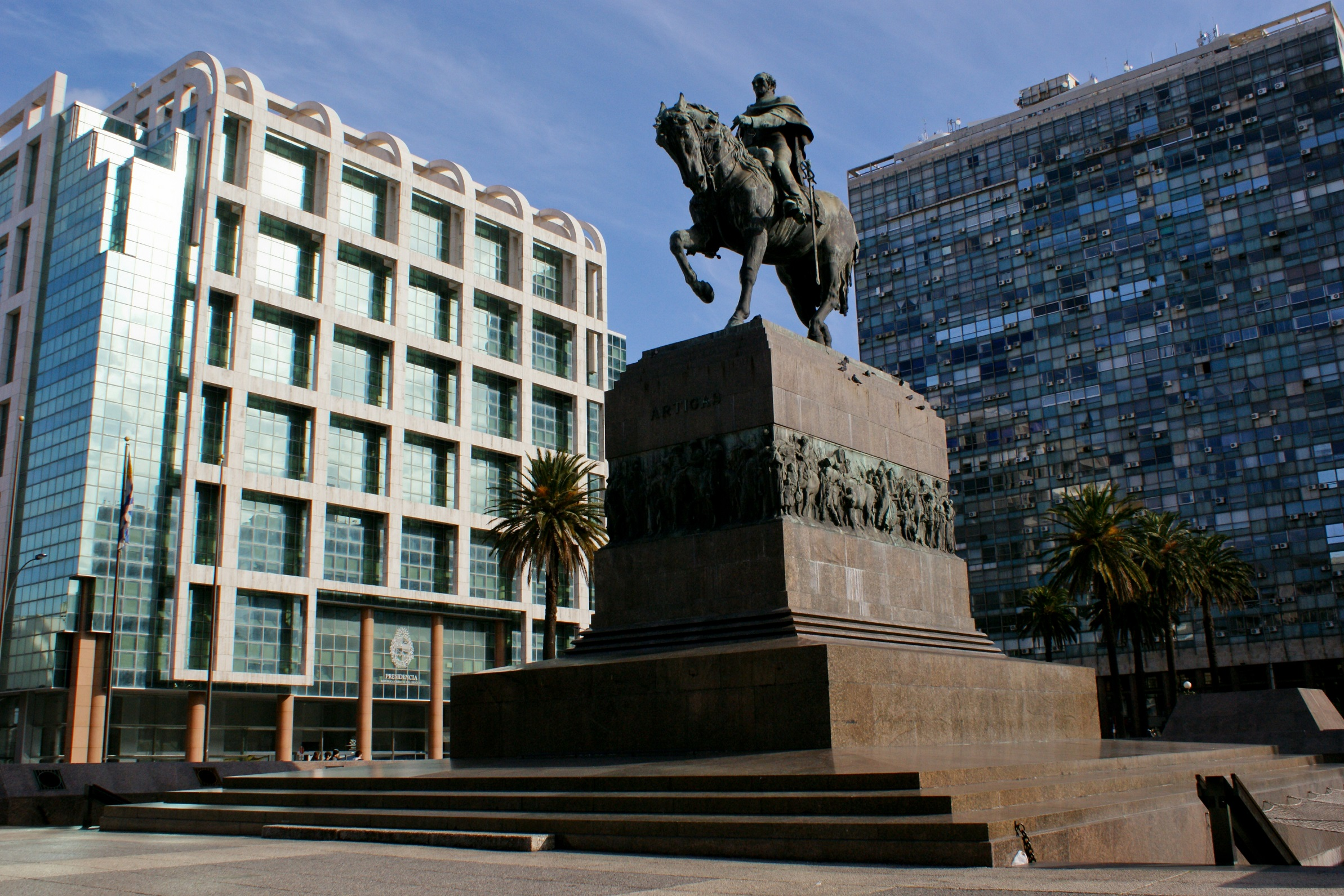
Monument at the entrance of the Artigas Mausoleum in Montevideo, Uruguay.

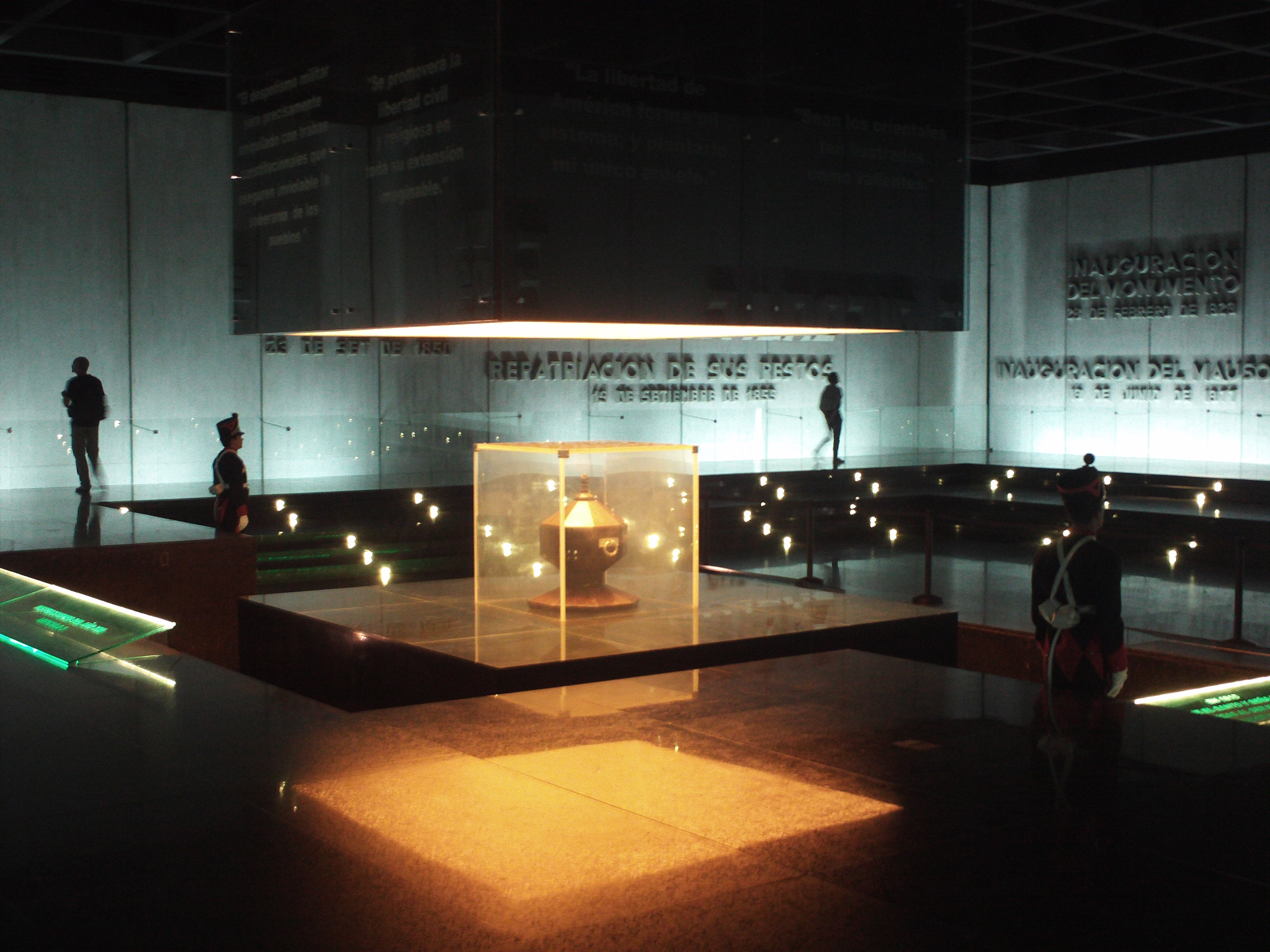
Inside of the Artigas Mausoleum.

==== Venezuela ====
- National Pantheon of Venezuela, mausoleum of Simón Bolívar
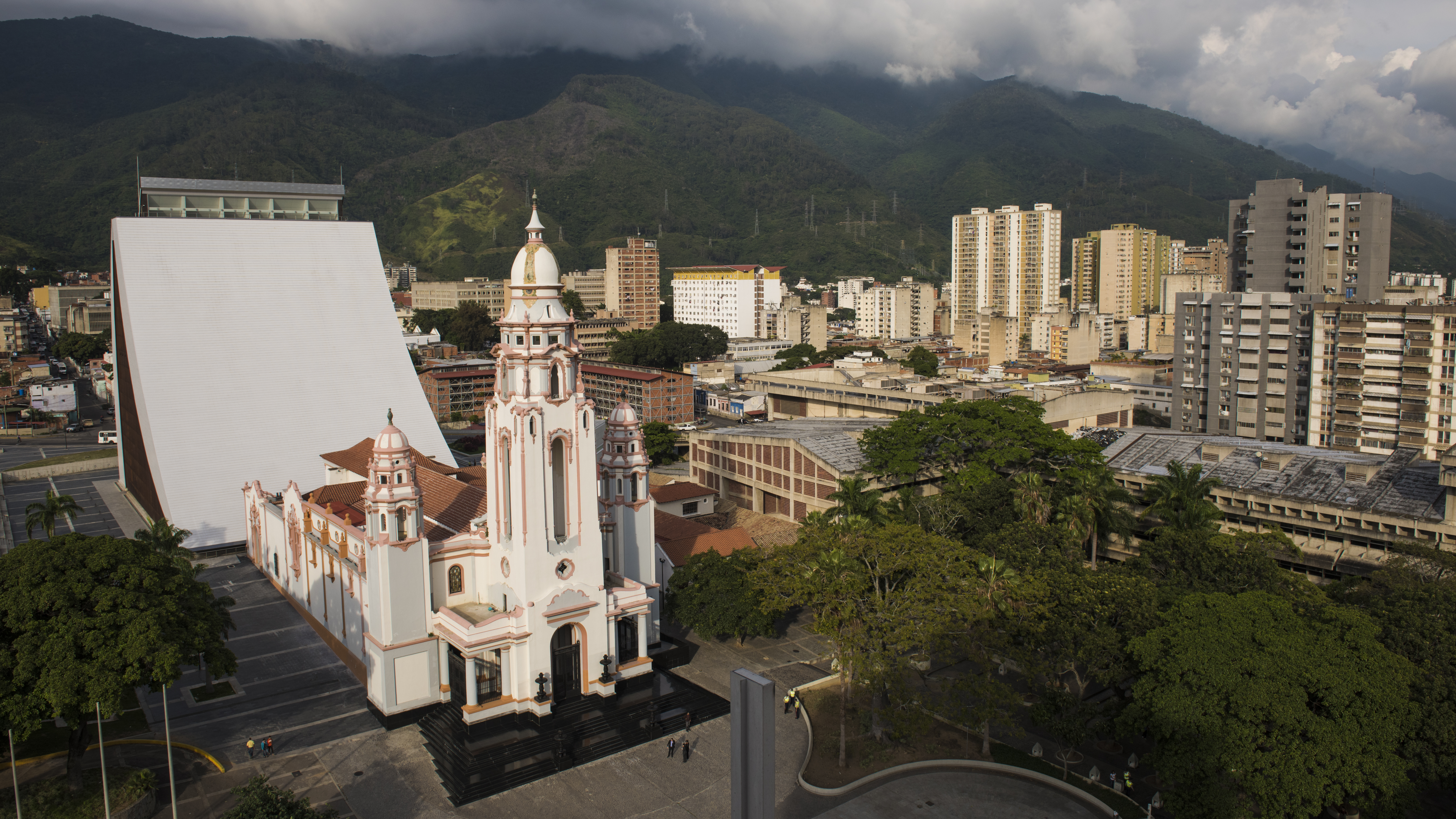
National Pantheon of Venezuela, mausoleum of Simón Bolívar in Caracas, Venezuela

=== North America ===
==== Canada ====
- Tomb of the Unknown Soldier (Canada) in Ottawa, Ontario
- Beechwood Cemetery in Vanier, Ottawa, Ontario
- Chapel Lawn Cemetery in Winnipeg, Manitoba
- Eaton family mausoleum at Mount Pleasant Cemetery in Toronto, Ontario
- Fairview Mausoleum in Niagara Falls, Ontario
- Francis Nicholson Darke's mausoleum at Regina Cemetery in Regina, Saskatchewan
- Hamilton Cemetery in Hamilton, Ontario
- Hart Massey's mausoleum at Mount Pleasant Cemetery in Toronto, Ontario
- Hillcrest Memorial Gardens in Saskatoon, Saskatchewan
- Holy Cross Cemetery (Edmonton) in Edmonton, Alberta
- Larson Mausoleum in Lang, Saskatchewan
- Mount Royal Cemetery, Outremont, Quebec
- Mountain View Cemetery (Vancouver) in Vancouver, British Columbia
- Notre Dame des Neiges Cemetery, Cote-des-Neiges-Notre-Dame-de-Grace, Montreal, Quebec
- Queen's Park Mausoleum in Calgary, Alberta
- Sir Henry Pellatt's mausoleum at Park Lawn Cemetery in Etobicoke, Ontario

==== Cuba ====
- Santa Ifigenia Cemetery, Santiago de Cuba

==== Dominican Republic ====
- Altar de la Patria, mausoleum to the Founding Fathers of the Dominican Republic
- National Pantheon of the Dominican Republic

==== El Salvador ====
- Los Ilustres Cemetery
- San Salvador Cathedral

==== Guatemala ====
- Guatemala City General Cemetery

==== Haiti ====
- Haiti's National Cemetery in Port-au-Prince, where François Duvalier, who ruled from 1957 to 1971, is buried

==== Jamaica ====
- The Bob Marley Church and Mausoleum in Nine Mile, Jamaica

==== Mexico ====
- El Ángel Victory column and mausoleum to the heroes of the Mexican Independence in Mexico City
- Monumento a la Revolución monument commemorating and mausoleum to the heroes of the Mexican Revolution in Mexico City
- Mexico City Metropolitan Cathedral, Mexico City
- Jardines Del Humaya, a cemetery with opulent multi-story and air-conditioned mausoleums of Mexican drug cartel members
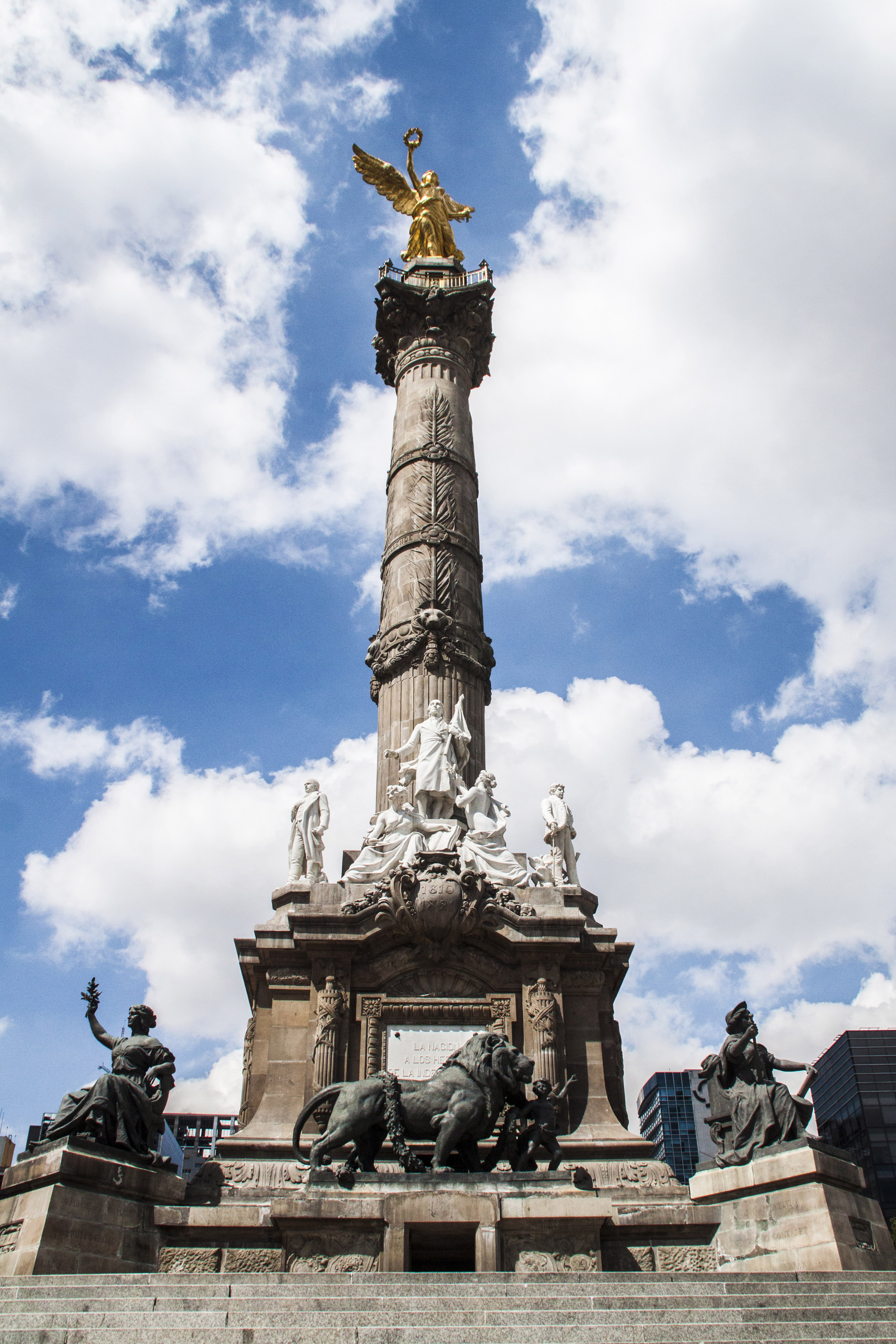
El Ángel Victory column and mausoleum to the heroes of the Mexican Independence in Mexico City, Mexico

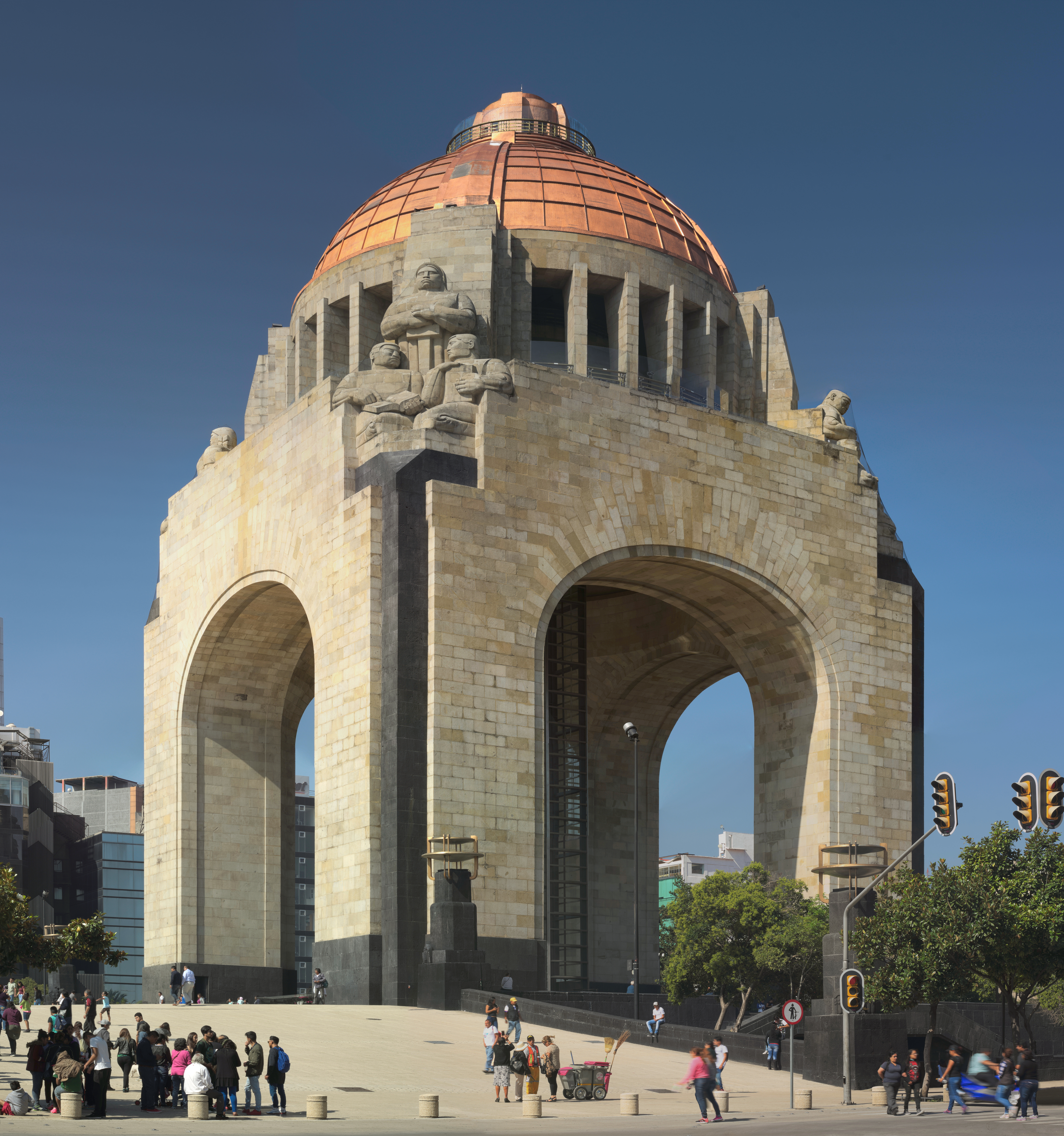
Monumento a la Revolución monument commemorating and mausoleum to the heroes of the Mexican Revolution in Mexico City, Mexico

==== Nicaragua ====
- Central Park, Managua

==== Panama ====
- Omar Torrijos Mausoleum, Amador, Panama City

==== United States ====
- Henry Flagler's mausoleum in St. Augustine, Florida
- Presidential memorials in the United States and Presidents' graves of the United States
  - Grant's Tomb in New York, New York
  - James A. Garfield Memorial in Cleveland, Ohio
  - Abraham Lincoln's tomb in Springfield, Illinois
- MacArthur Memorial in Norfolk, Virginia
- Crown Hill Memorial Park in Dallas, Texas
- Elmwood Cemetery and Mausoleum in Birmingham, Alabama
- Miles Mausoleum in Arlington National Cemetery
- Ferncliff Cemetery and Mausoleum in Hartsdale, New York
- Forest Lawn Memorial Park in Glendale, California
- Hillcrest Memorial Park in Augusta, Georgia
- Macon Memorial Park in Macon, Georgia
- Queen of Heaven Mausoleum in Queen of Heaven Cemetery, Hillside, Illinois
- Rose Hills Memorial Park, Whittier, California
- Wilhelm's Portland Memorial Funeral Home in Portland, Oregon
- Tacoma Mausoleum in Tacoma, Washington
- Tombs of the Uga mascots inside Sanford Stadium in Athens, Georgia
- Williamson Mausoleum at Orphans Cemetery in Eastman, Georgia
- Brigadier General Egbert Ludovicus Viele's Egyptian-style pyramid mausoleum in West Point, New York
- Rapper XXXTentacion's mausoleum at The Gardens of Boca Raton in Boca Raton, Florida
- Rapper Juice Wrld's mausoleum at Beverly Cemetery in Blue Island, Illinois
- Mausoleo a los Heroes de El Polvorín, at Cementerio Civil de Ponce in Ponce, Puerto Rico
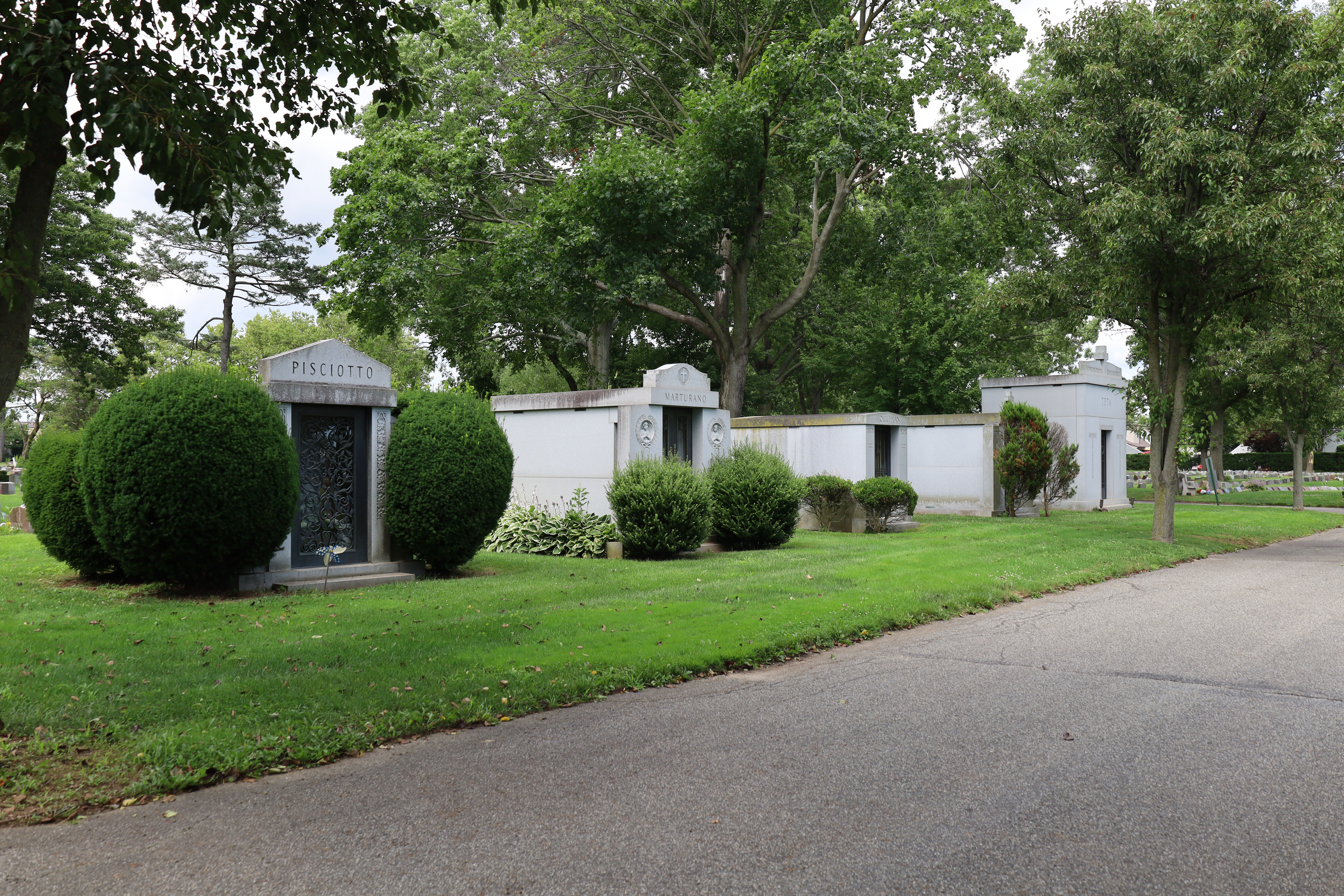
Mausolea in Cemetery of the Holy Rood on Long Island, New York

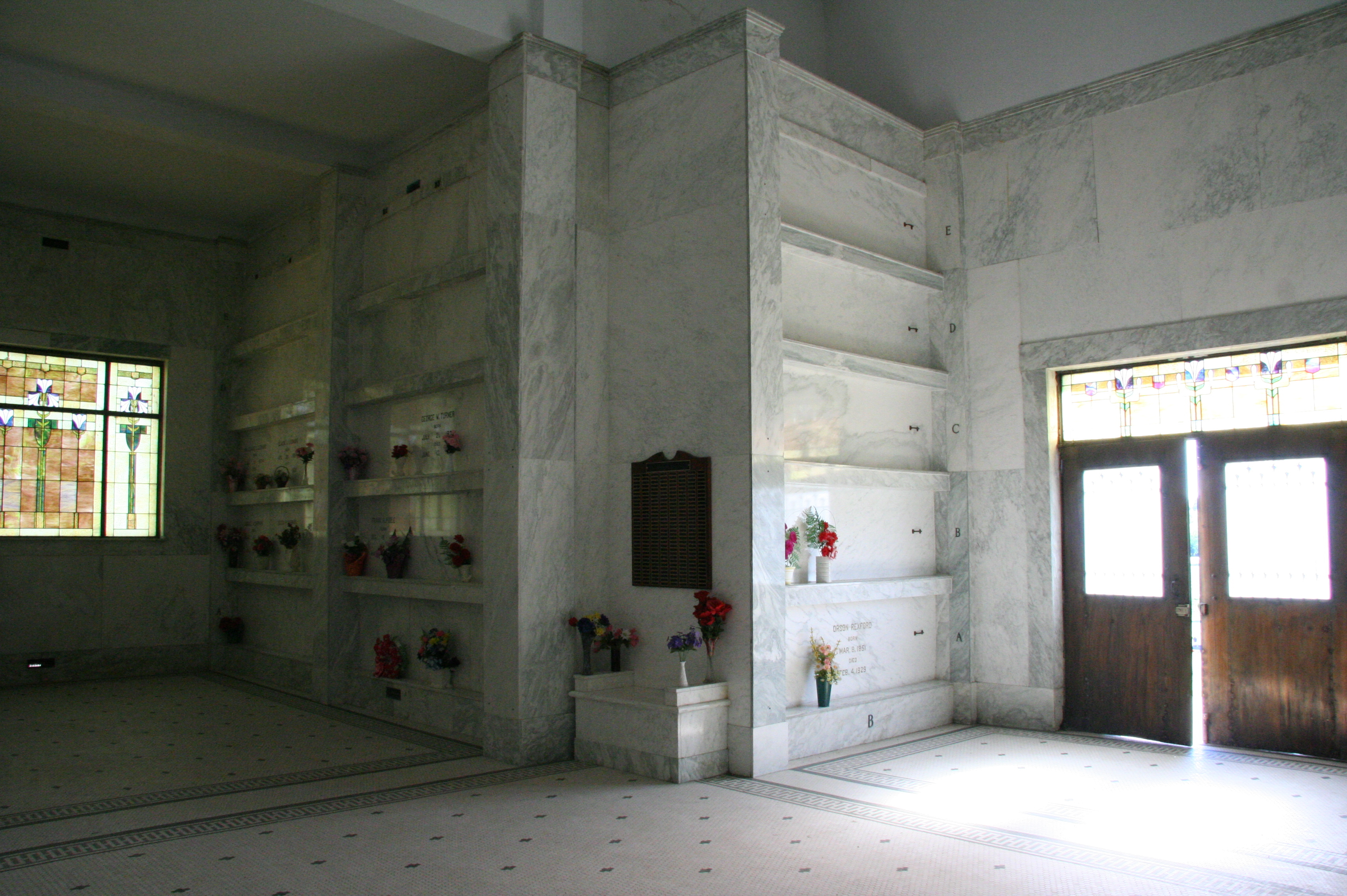
The interior of the Spring Valley Mausoleum in Minnesota, listed on the National Register of Historic Places

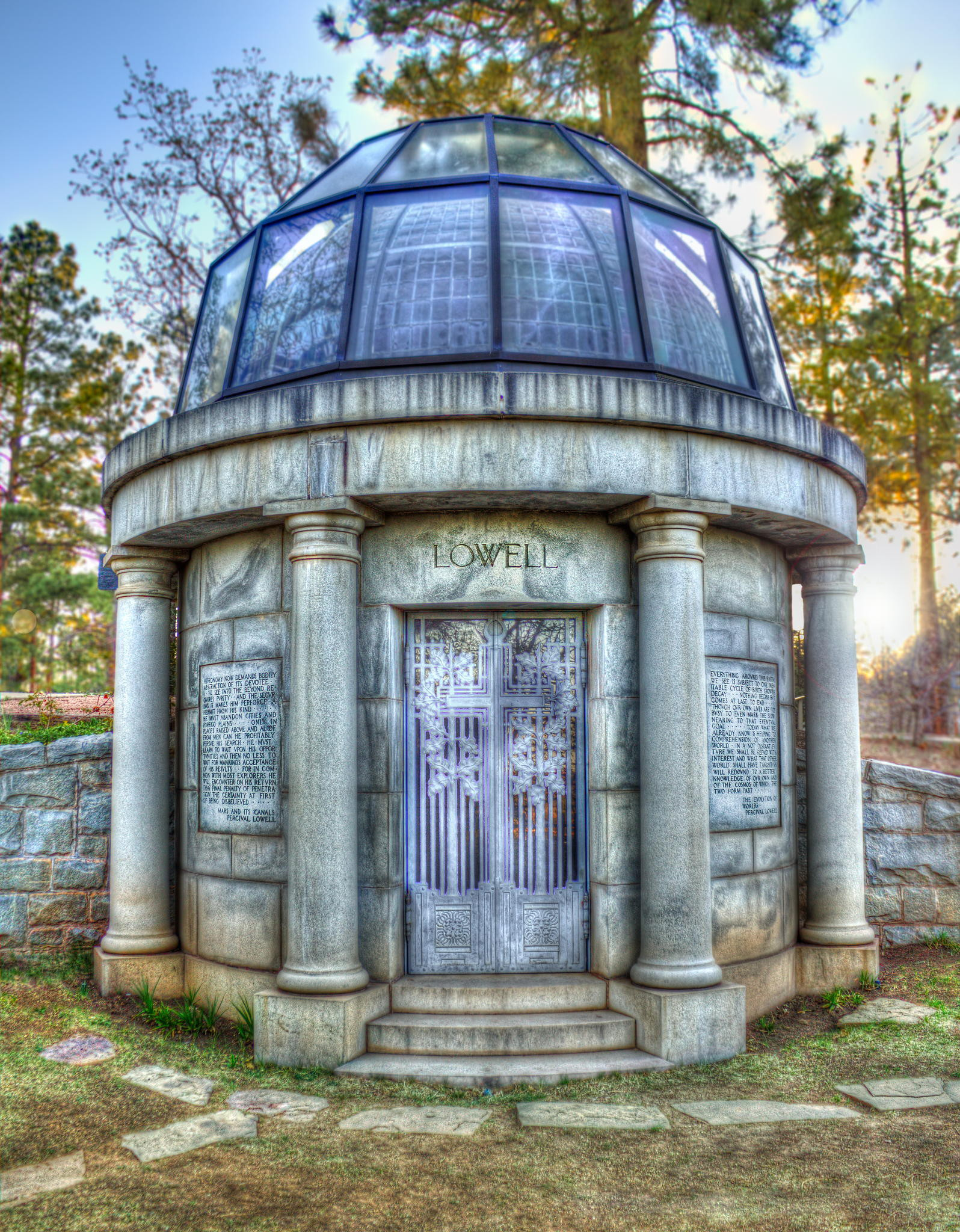
Percival Lowell – Mausoleum 2013 at the Lowell Observatory in Flagstaff, Arizona

=== Oceania ===
- Fremantle Cemetery in Palmyra, Western Australia.
- The Gatehouse Mausoleum in Parkville, Victoria, Australia.
- Guildford Cemetery, Western Australia in South Guildford, Western Australia.
- John Frazer's Mausoleum at Rookwood Cemetery in Rookwood, New South Wales, Australia.
- Karrakatta Cemetery in Karrakatta, Western Australia.
- Luciano Rossetti Mausoleum at Springvale Botanical Cemetery in Springvale, Victoria, Australia.
- Massey Memorial in Wellington, New Zealand, where New Zealand Prime Minister William Massey and his wife are interred.
- Midland Cemetery in Swan View, Western Australia.
- Savage Memorial at Bastion Point in Auckland, New Zealand, where New Zealand Prime Minister Michael Joseph Savage is entombed.
- Seppeltsfield Family Mausoleum within Barossa Valley near Adelaide, South Australia. Joseph Ernst Seppelt and Benno Seppelt are entombed here.
- Tomb of the Unknown Soldier in the Hall of Memory at the Australian War Memorial in Canberra, Australian Capital Territory.
- Woden Cemetery Mausoleum, Australian Capital Territory.
- Wentworth Mausoleum in Vaucluse, New South Wales, Australia.

== See also ==
- List of mausolea
- List of types of funerary monument
- Burial vault (tomb)
- Morgue or mortuary
- National Cemetery
- Ohel (grave)
- Sepulchre
- Guard mounting
