= Chakhar =

Chakhar চাখার
- Village
- Location in Bangladesh
- Coordinates: 22°31′N 90°24′E
- Country: Bangladesh
- Division: Barisal Division
- District: Barisal District
- Upazila: Banaripara Upazila

Area
  - Total: 2.19 km^{2} (0.85 sq mi)

Population (2022)
  - Total: 4,499
  - Density: 2,050/km^{2} (5,320/sq mi)
- Time zone: UTC+6 (Bangladesh Time)

Chakhar is a village in Banaripara Upazila of Barisal District in the Barisal Division of southern-central Bangladesh.

== Demography ==
According to the 2022 Census of Bangladesh, Chakhar had 996 households and a population of 4,499. It has a total area of 2.19 km^{2} (0.85 sq mi).

== Education ==
- Govt. Fazlul Huq College, Chakhar

== Tourist attraction ==
- Sher-E-Bangla Memorial Museum

== Notable people ==
- Syed Azizul Huq
- A. K. Faezul Huq
- A. K. Fazlul Huq
