= Sher-e-Bangla (disambiguation) =

Sher-e-Bangla (Bengali: শেরে বাংলা, lit. 'Tiger of Bengal'), often refers to A. K. Fazlul Huq (1873–1962), nicknamed Sher-e-Bangla, who was a Bengali-born Pakistani statesman in whose honor several institutions and places have been named, and it may also refer to:

- Sher-e-Bangla Nagar, a neighborhood in Dhaka, Bangladesh
- Sher-e-Bangla Nagar Government Boys' High School, in Agargaon, Dhaka, Bangladesh
- Sher-e-Bangla National Cricket Stadium, in Mirpur, Dhaka, Bangladesh
- Sher-e-Bangla Agricultural University, in Dhaka, Bangladesh
- Sher-e-Bangla Medical College, in Barisal City, Bangladesh
- Sher-E-Bangla Memorial Museum in Barisal District, Bangladesh
- National Football Championship (Bangladesh), also known as the Sher-e-Bangla Cup, district-level national football tournament in Bangladesh
