= Swami Paramananda =

Indian Hindu leader (1884–1940)

Paramananda
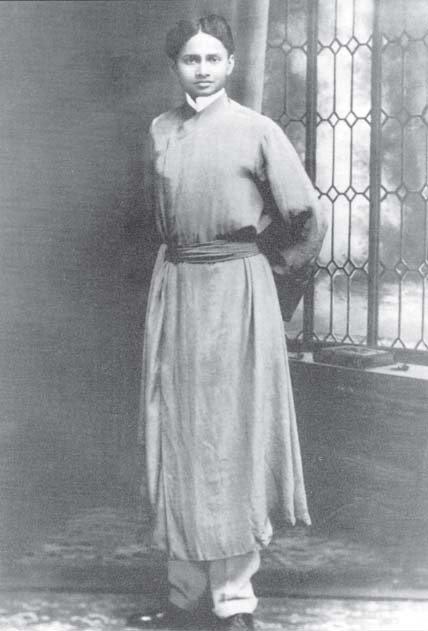
- Paramananda circa 1910
- Born: Suresh Chandra Guhathakurta; 5 February 1884; Banaripara, East Bengal, British India
- Died: 21 June 1940 (aged 56); Cohasset, Massachusetts, U.S.

Paramananda (1884–1940) was a swami and one of the early Indian teachers who went to the United States to spread the Vedanta philosophy and religion there. He was a mystic, a poet and an innovator in spiritual community living.

== Biography ==
=== Birth and early life ===
Paramananda was born on 5 February 1884 as Suresh Chandra Guhathakurta, the youngest son of a prestigious Guhathakurta family, in the village of Banaripara. The village is in Barisal District, which was then part of East Bengal in British India and is now part of Banaripara Upazila, Bangladesh. His father, Ananda Mohan Guha-Thakurta, was well known as a progressive, a champion for women's education, a legacy he was to pass along to his sons. His mother, Brahmamoyee Basu, bore eight children before dying of cancer in her early forties, when Suresh was nine years old. Suresh was known for his affectionate nature and cheerfulness. When Suresh was sixteen, his father began to lose his eyesight. As a result, Suresh read devotional texts aloud and one that was particularly compelling was a collection of "Sayings of Sri Ramakrishna," a revered saint who had died fourteen years prior.

=== Joining the Ramakrishna Order ===
On his seventeenth birthday, Suresh joined a group of older men from the village in a journey to Belur Math to visit the monastery and temple founded by Ramakrishna's disciples. There he met his teacher, Vivekananda, who was the foremost disciple of Ramakrishna and the first swami to teach in America.

Paramananda was initiated a month before his eighteenth birthday, becoming a monk (sannyasin) of the Ramakrishna Order and the youngest disciple of Vivekananda. The President of the Ramakrishna Math, Brahmananda, would call Suresh "Basanta Kokhil" [spring-bird], or simply "Basanta" [spring] and that became his new nickname. He trained under the mentorship of Ramakrishnananda, also a direct disciple of Ramakrishna, and founder of the Madras Math, a thousand miles south of Calcutta.

=== In the West. Ananda Ashrama ===
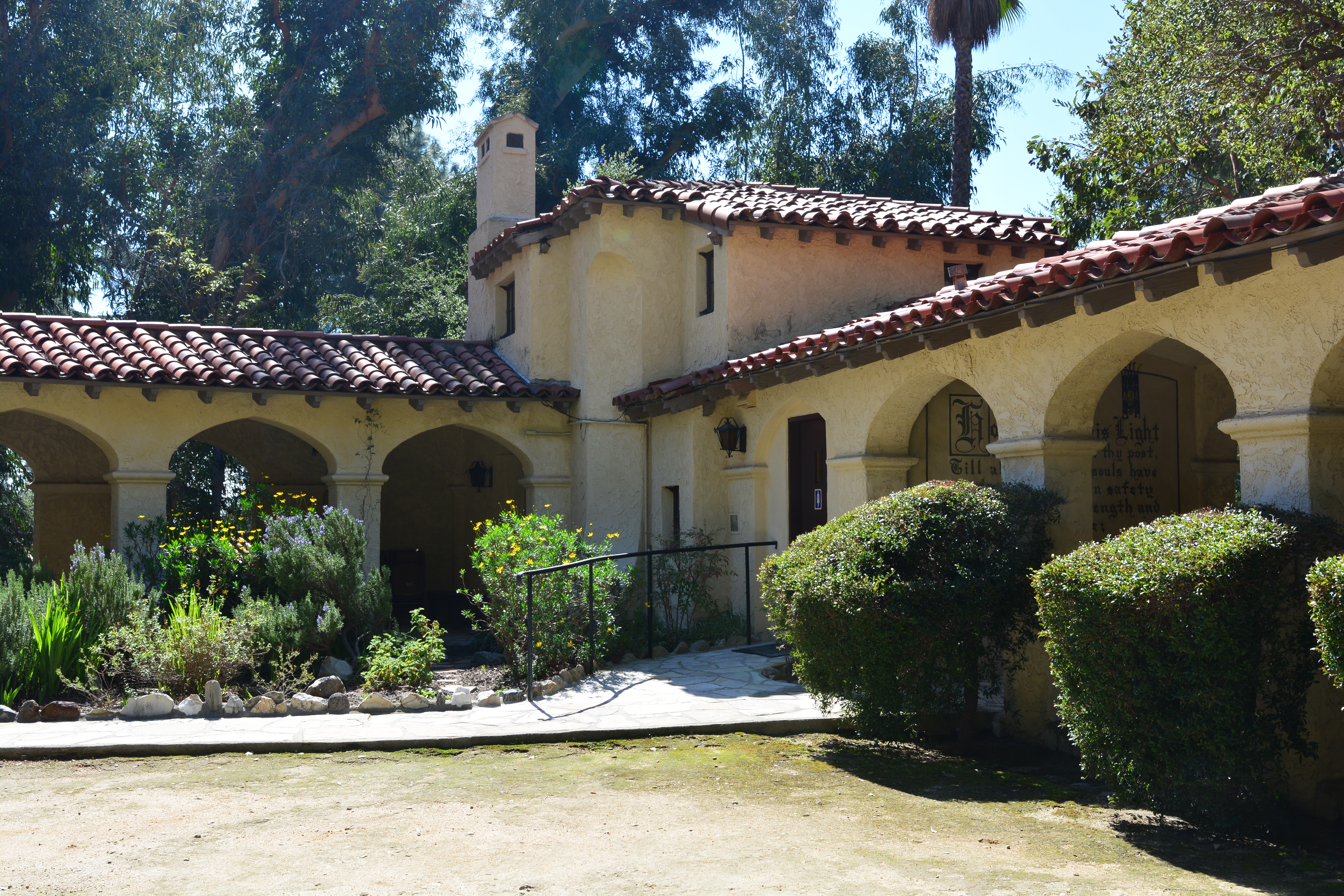
Ananda Ashrama Community, La Crescenta, California. Founded 1923, photographed 2025.

Paramananda was sent to New York in 1906 at the age of twenty-two to assist at the previously established New York Vedanta Society. He lived and taught there until 1909, when Paramananda established the Vedanta Centre of Boston. He lectured throughout the United States, Europe and Asia for thirty-four years, until his death in 1940.

He founded four nonsectarian ashramas where residents are primarily women, two in the United States and two in Calcutta, India (originally run by his disciple Charushila Devi in Dhaka, East Bengal now Bangladesh). They are still thriving today. In America are Ananda Ashrama (often used as the name for the all movement) in La Crescenta, California (1923) and Vedanta Centre in Cohasset, Massachusetts (1929).

Like his teacher Vivekananda, Paramananda believed in equality between men and women. He established disciplined communities of nuns under the supervision of Sister Devamata (1867–1942), his American first disciple, whom he ordained to teach Vedanta from the platform in 1910. She was the first American woman to teach Vedanta . Throughout the entire history of the community, women were accorded positions of leadership in all areas of the work. The first Indian woman to join the community was Gayatri Devi (1906–1995), who was brought by Paramananda in 1926 to be trained as one of his assistants. She became the spiritual leader of the ashramas upon Paramananda's death in 1940 and was the first Indian woman to be ordained a teacher in America. At a result of ordaining women to teach, the Ramakrishna Mission excommunicated Ananda Ashrama. In 1995 Dr. Susan Schrager (a.k.a. Mother Sudha Puri) accepted the spiritual leadership.

Two schools and orphanages for girls in need, also called Ananda Ashrama, continue today in Calcutta, India in the neighborhoods of Naktala and Bonhoogly.

== Works ==
Paramananda founded the "Message of the East" in 1909, the first Vedanta periodical published in the United States which continued for 55 years, offering articles, poetry and commentary on all religions in its monthly, and later quarterly, magazine. He authored translations of the Bhagavad Gita and The Upanishads as well as four volumes of mystical poetry, "The Vigil", "Rhythm of Life", "Soul's Secret Door" and "My Creed" and many other books and publications.

== Books on and by Swami Paramananda ==
- A Bridge of Dreams – the Story of Paramananda a Modern Mystic and His Ideal of All-Conquering Love by Sara Ann Levinsky ISBN 0-89281-063-7
- Bhagavad Gita, Srimad translated by Paramananda ISBN 0-911564-32-2
- Book of Daily Thoughts and Prayers by Paramananda ISBN 0-911564-32-2
- Christ and Oriental Ideals by Paramananda, Vedanta Centre Publishers
- Concentration and Meditation By Paramananda, Vedanta Centre Publishers
- Emerson and Vedanta by Paramananda, Vedanta Centre Publishers
- Faith is Power by Paramananda, Vedanta Centre Publishers (first published as Faith as a Constructive Force)
- Healing Meditations by Paramananda, Vedanta Centre Publishers
- Vedanta in Practice by Paramananda, Vedanta Centre Publishers
- My Creed (Poetry) By Paramananda, Vedanta Centre Publishers
- Right Resolutions by Paramananda, Vedanta Centre Publishers
- Rhythm of Life (Poetry) by Paramananda, Vedanta Centre Publishers
- Self-Mastery by Paramananda, Vedanta Centre
- Silence as Yoga by Paramananda ISBN 81-7120-181-4
- Soul's Secret Door (Poetry) by Paramananda, Vedanta Centre Publishers
- Spiritual Healing by Para ananda, Vedanta Centre Publishers
- Sri Ramakrishna and His Disciples by Sister Devamata La Crescenta, CA: Ananda-Ashram, 1928
- Swami Paramananda and His Work Volumes I and II, by Sister Devamata, Ananda Ashrama
- The Guru and the Disciple by Sister Daya, Vedanta Centre Publishers
- The Path of Devotion by Paramananda, Vedanta Centre Publishers
- The Upanishads Translation by Paramananda, Vedanta Centre Publishers
- The Vigil (Poetry) by Paramananda, Vedanta Centre Publishers
- The Way of Peace and Blessedness by Paramananda ISBN 0-7661-4460-7
- Vedanta in Practice by Paramananda, Vedanta Centre Publishers

== Sources ==
- Jones, Constance A.; Ryan, James D. (2007). Encyclopedia of Hinduism. Encyclopedia of World Religions. J. Gordon Melton, Series Editor. New York: Facts On File. ISBN 978-0-8160-5458-9. Archived from the original on 7 January 2019.
