= Govt. Fazlul Huq College, Chakhar =

Institution of higher education in Bangladesh

Govt. Fuzlul Huque College, Chakhar
- সরকারি ফজলুল হক কলেজ, চাখার
- Type: Public
- Established: 27 November 1940; 85 years ago
- Affiliations: National University
- Principal: Mohammad Abdur Rab
- Academic staff: 40
- Administrative staff: 2
- Students: 5000
- Location: Chakhar, Banaripara Upazila, Barisal District, Bangladesh; 22.8069°N 90.1951°E
- Campus: Urban (35.20 acres)
- Website: fhcchakhar.gov.bd

Govt. Fuzlul Huq College is a public institution for higher education in Chakhar, a small town in Barisal District in Bangladesh. It was founded in 1940 by then Prime Minister of Bengal A K Fazlul Huq with a view to creating opportunity of higher education to underprivileged students in rural areas. It offers Higher Secondary School Certificate (HSC), as well as 3 years degree(pass) courses and 4 years honours programs which divisions are affiliated to the National University, Bangladesh. It is the second oldest and largest college in Barisal division and was previously affiliated with University of Calcutta before partition and University of Dhaka after formation of Pakistan and Bangladesh respectively.

== History ==
Chakhar is a prominent village town in Barisal district best known for the parental home of the Sher-e-Bangla A.K. Fazlul Huq. It's located about 16 miles to the north-west of the district headquarters and administered under Chakhar union of Banaripara sub-district. It is also home of some aristocratic Muslim families and Zammindars of Mughal era. The Zamindars were reported to have been entrusted with some revenue powers, especially collection of Chouth, i.e. chau-kar from which probably the name Chakhar originated.

During the early 1930s, Huq bequeathed his entire homestead and other ancestral properties at Chakhar for the interests of education. Chakhar, also patronised and inspired by him, gradually became an important centre of culture and education.

In 1940, Fazlul Huq College was established as a degree college at Chakhar. He also founded a high school, known as Chakhar Fazlul Huq Institution for boys (Multilateral) and another for girls, known as Wazed Memorial Girls High School. Huq himself also established a public library, a reading hall, a rural reconstruction society, a boys' club and a rural hospital in the village.

The college was nationalized in 1978 by the Government of Bangladesh.

== Library ==
The central library of Dhaka College was established in 1940 at the time of establishment of the college. It has a collection of 10,000 books sponsored by A K Fazlul Huq himself.

== Academics ==
Fazlul Huq College offers H.S.C.under the Barisal education Board, 3 years degree courses and four years Honours programs in Nine Important Subject under National University, Bangladesh

For HSC Level ↓

- Science
- Business Studies
- Humanities

For Degree (Pass) Level ↓

- B.A. (Pass)
- B.Sc. (Pass)
- B.B.S.(Pass)

For Honours Level ↓

- Department of Bangla
- Department of English
- Department of History
- Department of Islamic history and culture
- Department of Philosophy
- Department of Political Science
- Department of Economics
- Department of Accounting
- Department of Management
