= Mausoleum of Three Leaders =

Mausoleum in Dhaka, Bangladesh

Three National Leaders' Shrine
- জাতীয় তিন নেতার মাজার
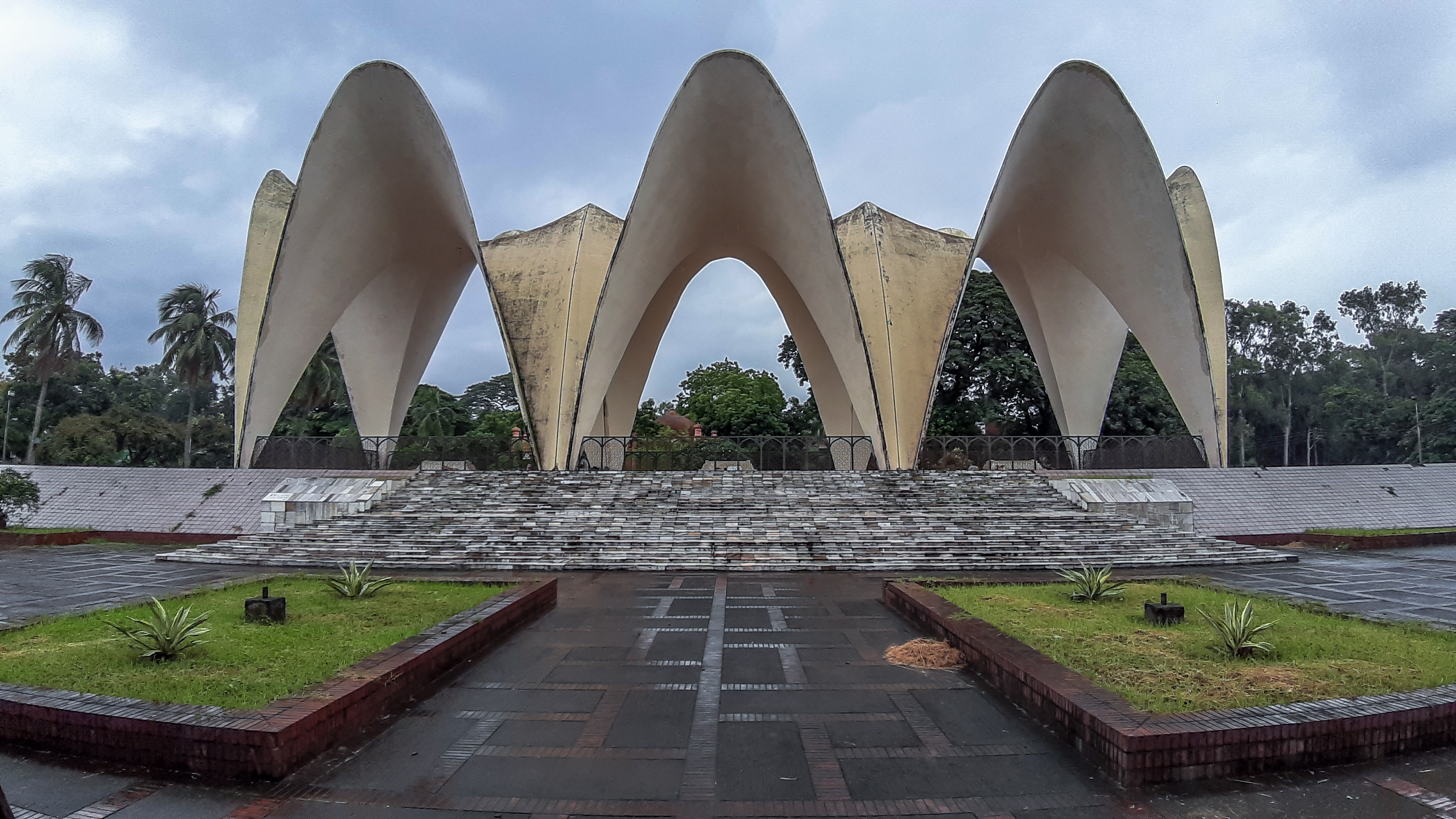
- The mausoleum in 2019
- Interactive map of Three National Leaders' Shrine
- Location: New Dhaka, Bangladesh
- Coordinates: 23.72911°N 90.39997°E
- Type: Mausoleum
- Material: Concrete, ceramic and marble
- Completion date: 1986
- Dedicated to: A. K. Fazlul Huq; Huseyn Suhrawardy; Khwaja Nazimuddin

The Mausoleum of Three Leaders, officially Three National Leaders' Shrine, located at Shahbag, New Dhaka in Bangladesh. It contains the graves of three prominent leaders of Pakistan Movement from Bengal: A. K. Fazlul Huq, Huseyn Shaheed Suhrawardy and Khwaja Nazimuddin. All three men served as the Prime Minister of Bengal in British India and after independence two of them also served as Prime Minister of Pakistan.

== Location ==
The Mausoleum is situated on the west side of Bangladesh Shishu Academy and Shahbaz Khan Mosque and accessible from Kazi Nazrul Islam Avenue. It is located in Suhrawardy Udyan in Shahbagh across from the Doel Square near the University of Dhaka.

== History ==
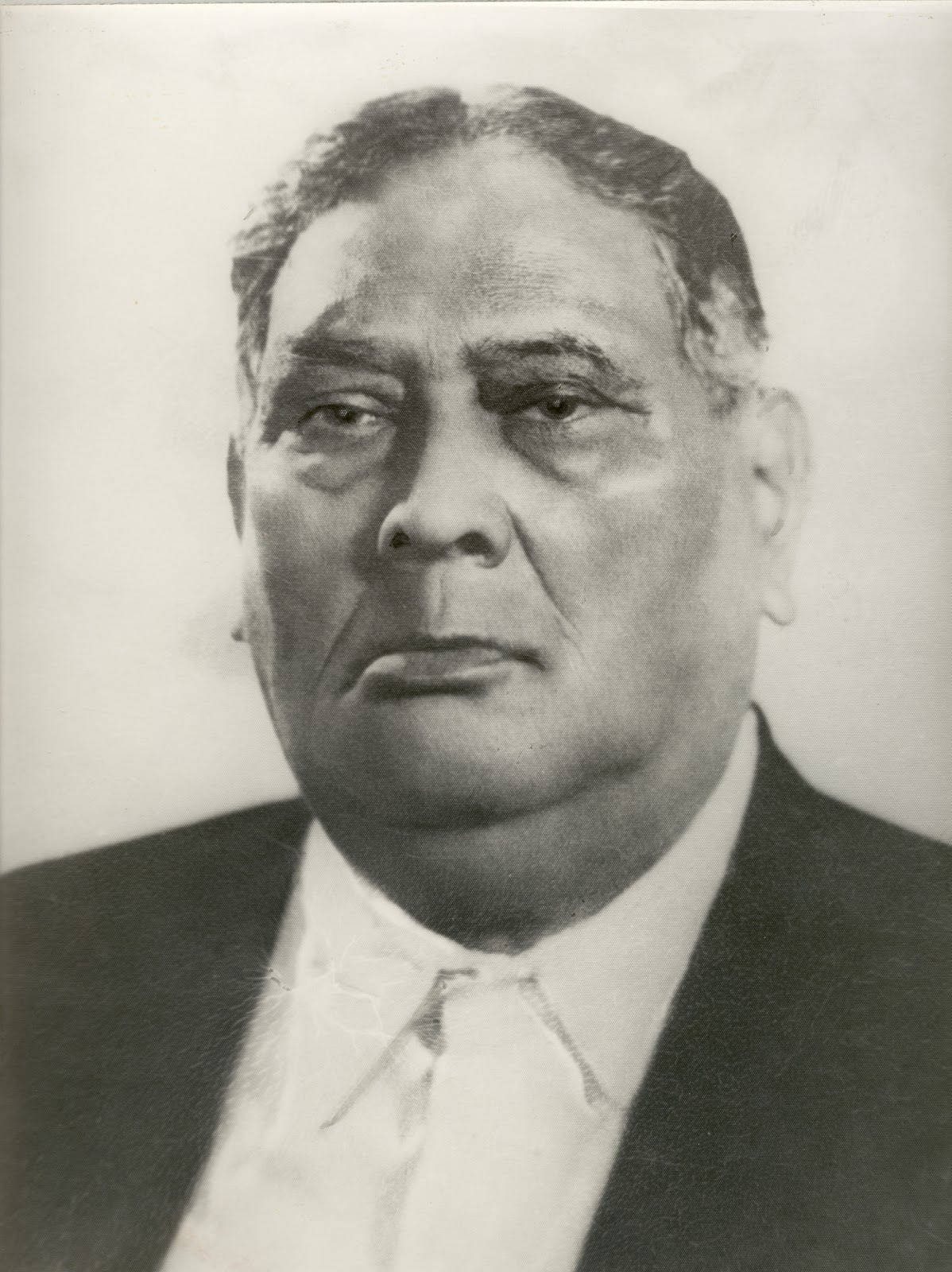
A. K. Fazlul Huq, first Prime Minister of Bengal, died in 1962

In 1962, A. K. Fazlul Huq, the third prime minister of East Bengal and the founder-president of the Krishak Sramik Party (KSP) died. After his death, Huq's funeral prayer was held at Paltan Maidan in Dhaka in the presence of at least one hundred thousand people, after which he was buried in the premises of the East Pakistan High Court. After the burial, a committee was formed to construct a mausoleum over his grave, consisting of politicians Nurul Amin, Abu Hussain Sarkar, Ataur Rahman Khan, Yusuf Ali Chowdhury and Syed Azizul Huq. However, the government of East Pakistan subsequently formed another committee for the construction of the mausoleum, appointing the Commissioner of Dhaka Division as its chairman.

On 22 May 1962, at a meeting of the A. K. Fazlul Huq Memorial Committee, chaired by the Commissioner of Dhaka Division, a decision was taken to construct a "simple but dignified" mausoleum for Huq's grave. On 25 June 1963, the Memorial Committee fixed 30 September of the same year as the deadline for submitting designs for the proposed mausoleum over the grave and announced prizes of Rs. 2,500, Rs. 1,500 and Rs. 1,000 respectively for the best three designs. On 17 July 1963, the provincial government permitted the committee to raise subscriptions up to a maximum of Rs. 500,000 for the construction of the mausoleum.

Toward the end of 1963, Huseyn Shaheed Suhrawardy, the fifth Pakistani prime minister and founder-president of the All-Pakistan Awami League (AL), died and was buried in the High Court premises beside the grave of Huq. In 1964, after his death, Khwaja Nazimuddin, the second governor-general of Pakistan and founder-president of the Council Muslim League (CML), was buried beside the graves of the two leaders in the High Court premises in the presence of thousands of people.

On 12 July 1966, Ahmadul Kabir, member of the East Pakistan Provincial Assembly placed a proposal for the provincial government to construct the mausoleum, although the proposal failed. On 9 February 1967, a proposal was raised and discussed in the Provincial Assembly to construct a mausoleum surrounding the graves of the three leaders. However, after the discussion, the members did not reach any decision. Despite several attempts up to 1968, no final step was taken to construct the mausoleum.

On 16 July 1970, the Public Works Department of the provincial government announced the final decision to construct the mausoleum and invited preliminary designs for it. Construction of the mausoleum was planned for the end of September the following year. On 26 September 1971, the KSP working committee proposed to their party president and provincial minister ASM Solomon that the responsibility for the mausoleum's construction be transferred to a newly reconstituted committee by reorganizing it.

After the independence of Bangladesh, in 1972 the new government formed an eleven-member committee headed by Muzaffar Ahmed Chowdhury, the vice-chancellor of the University of Dhaka, to prepare plans for the proposed mausoleum and other projects in the capital in response to public demand. Eventually, the construction of the mausoleum was completed in 1986 during the presidency of Hussain Muhammad Ershad.

In 2015, the Rapid Action Battalion (RAB) recovered 18 cocktails from the mausoleum. After the incident, the Rapid Action Battalion started an investigation into the matter. In 2022, two people, including a policeman, were injured while trying to stop the fight between the two sides inside the mausoleum. According to a 2024 report, the mausoleum has deteriorated due to lack of care and maintenance, and the site has become a haven for criminals. After student and activist of Bangladesh Nationalist Students' Party, Shahriar Alam Samya, was stabbed to death at Suhrawardy Udyan in 2025, criminals from the Suhrawardy Udyan shifted their activities to the mausoleum area.

== Burials ==
Name	Birth	Death	Explanation	Source
A.K. Fazlul Huq	1873	1962	Presenter of the Lahore Resolution in 1940, founder of the KSP, prime minister of East Bengal in 1954, interior minister of Pakistan from 1955 to 1956 and governor of East Pakistan from 1956 to 1958.	
Huseyn Shaheed Suhrawardy	1892	1963	Proposer of United Bengal in 1946, founder of the AL, law minister of Pakistan from 1954 to 1955, prime minister of Pakistan from 1956 to 1957 and founder of the National Democratic Front (NDF).	
Khwaja Nazimuddin	1894	1964	Member of Dhaka Nawab family, prime minister of East Bengal from 1947 to 1948, governor-general of Pakistan from 1948 to 1951 and prime minister of Pakistan from 1951 to 1953.	

== Architecture ==
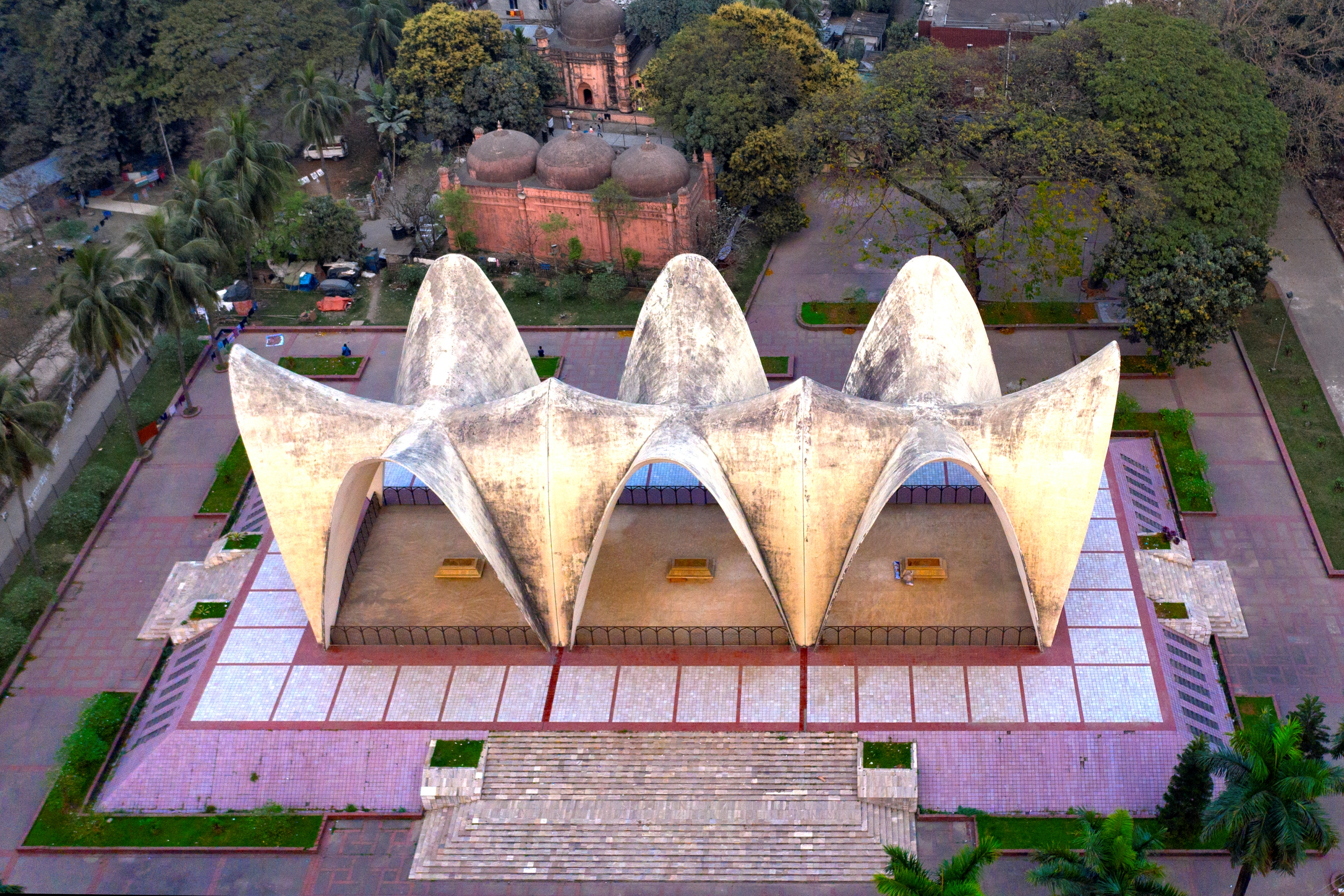
Aerial view of the mausoleum

It was designed by architect Masud Ahmad and S. A. Zahiruddin. The style of architecture of the monuments is an interpretation of Islamic Arcs. The Mausoleum of three leaders consists of a hyperbolic paraboloid structure that is erected over the three graves of the three political leaders. It is possible to enter this mausoleum from two sides. Although you have to go underground to see the three tombs located here, there are replicas of three graves below the monument.

== Legacy ==
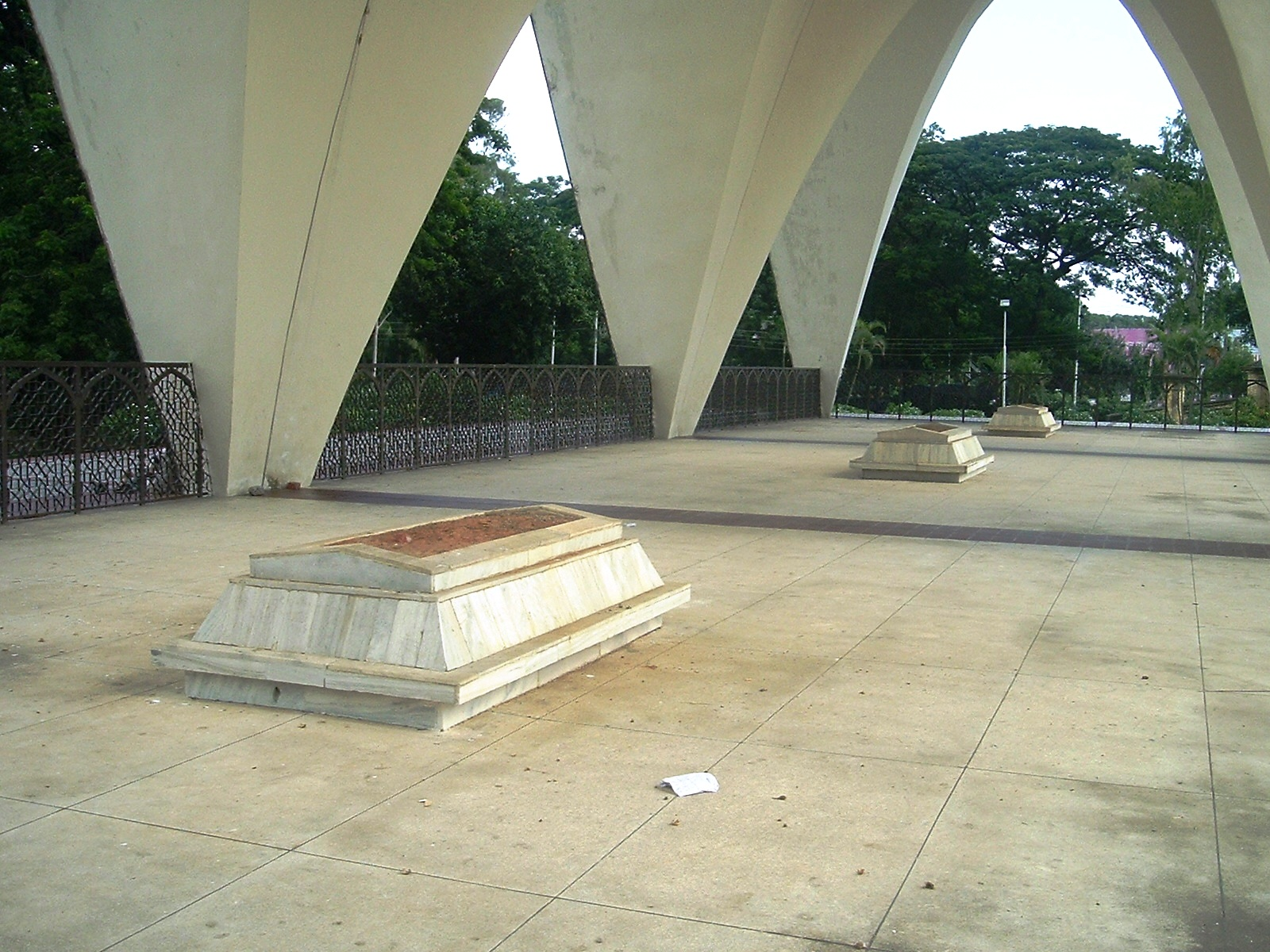
Three graves at the mausoleum

The three political leaders buried in this mausoleum were died on different dates but were all buried in the same area as all three of them had contributed significantly to East Pakistan and were all involved politically. Even with all these achievements, it was rumored that these three political leaders had a rivalry with each other in terms of success. However, despite their rivalry, three of the political leaders were buried under the same roof of the mausoleum. It is considered as the "significant architectural monument" of the country. However, many pedestrians don't know about the existence and significance of the mausoleum.

== Gallery ==
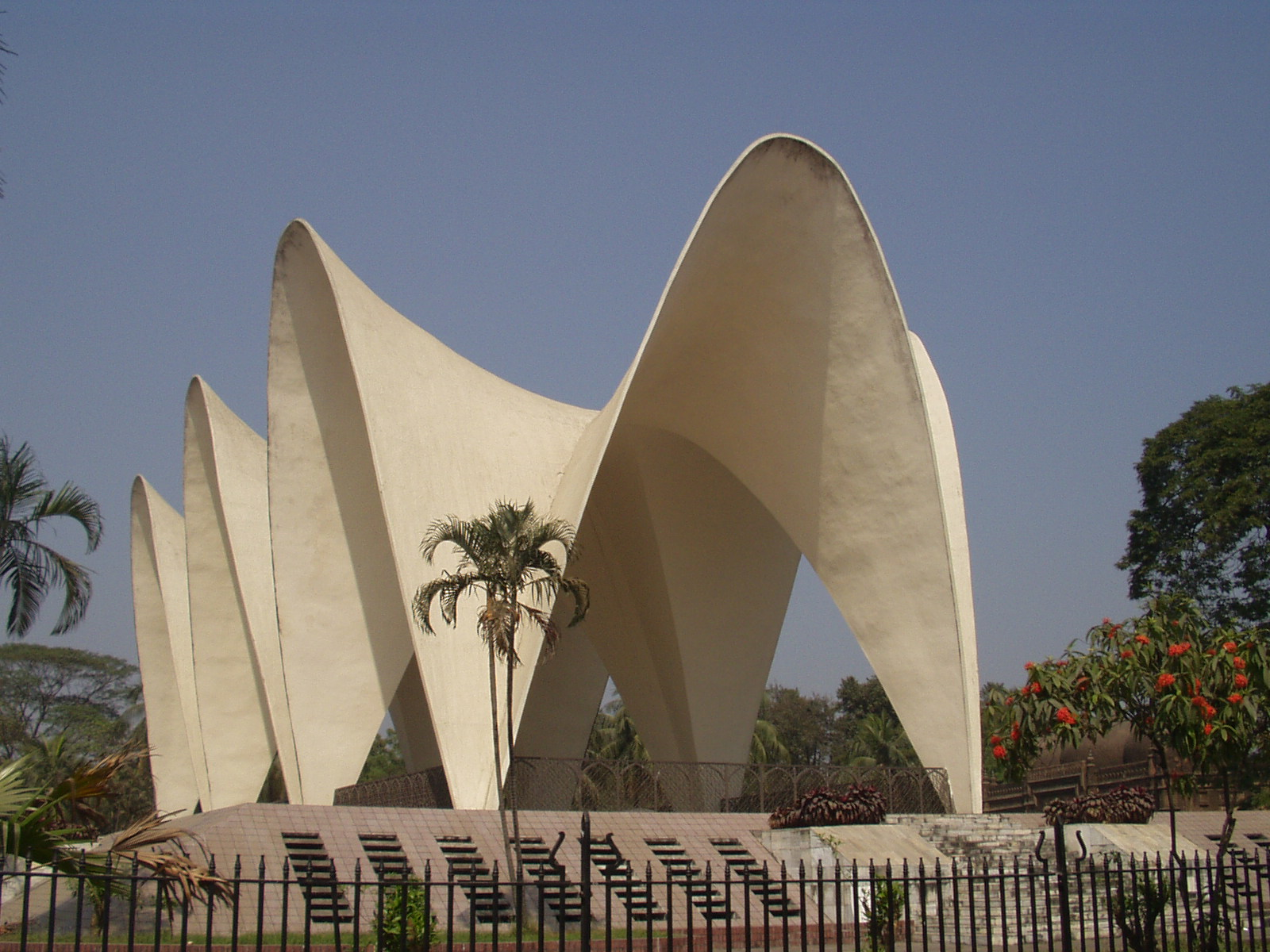
A view from the south-west

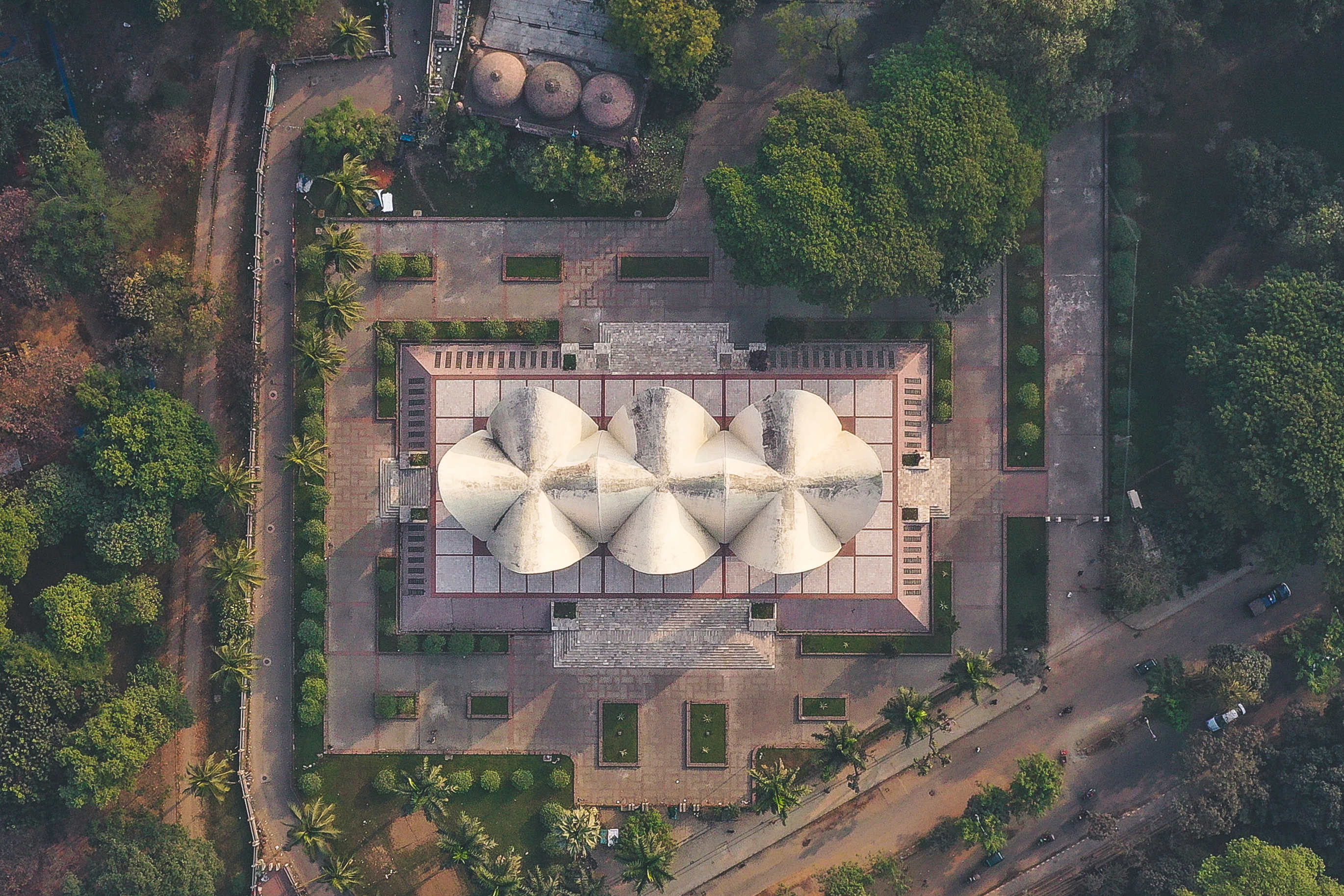
Space view

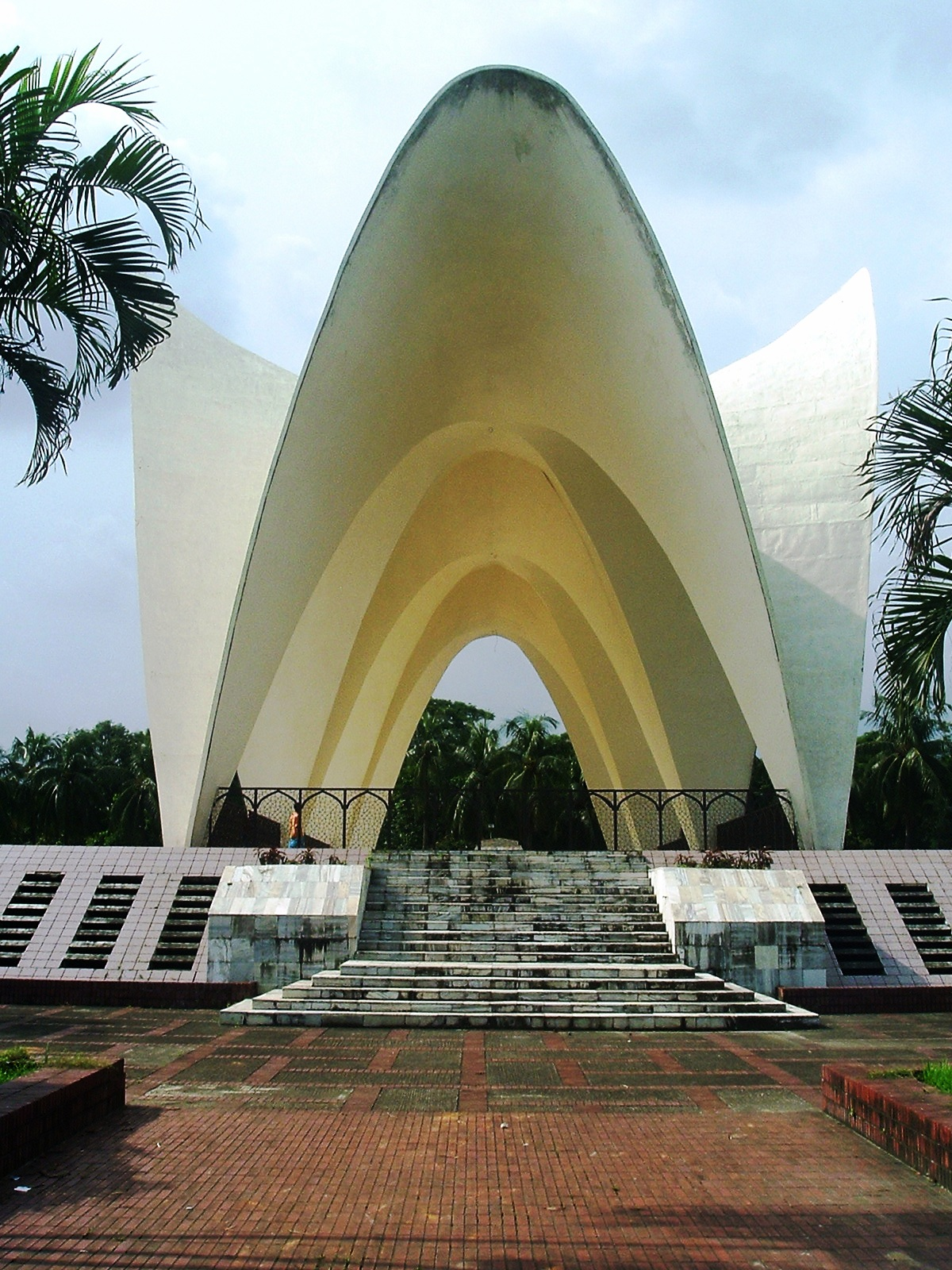
From the south

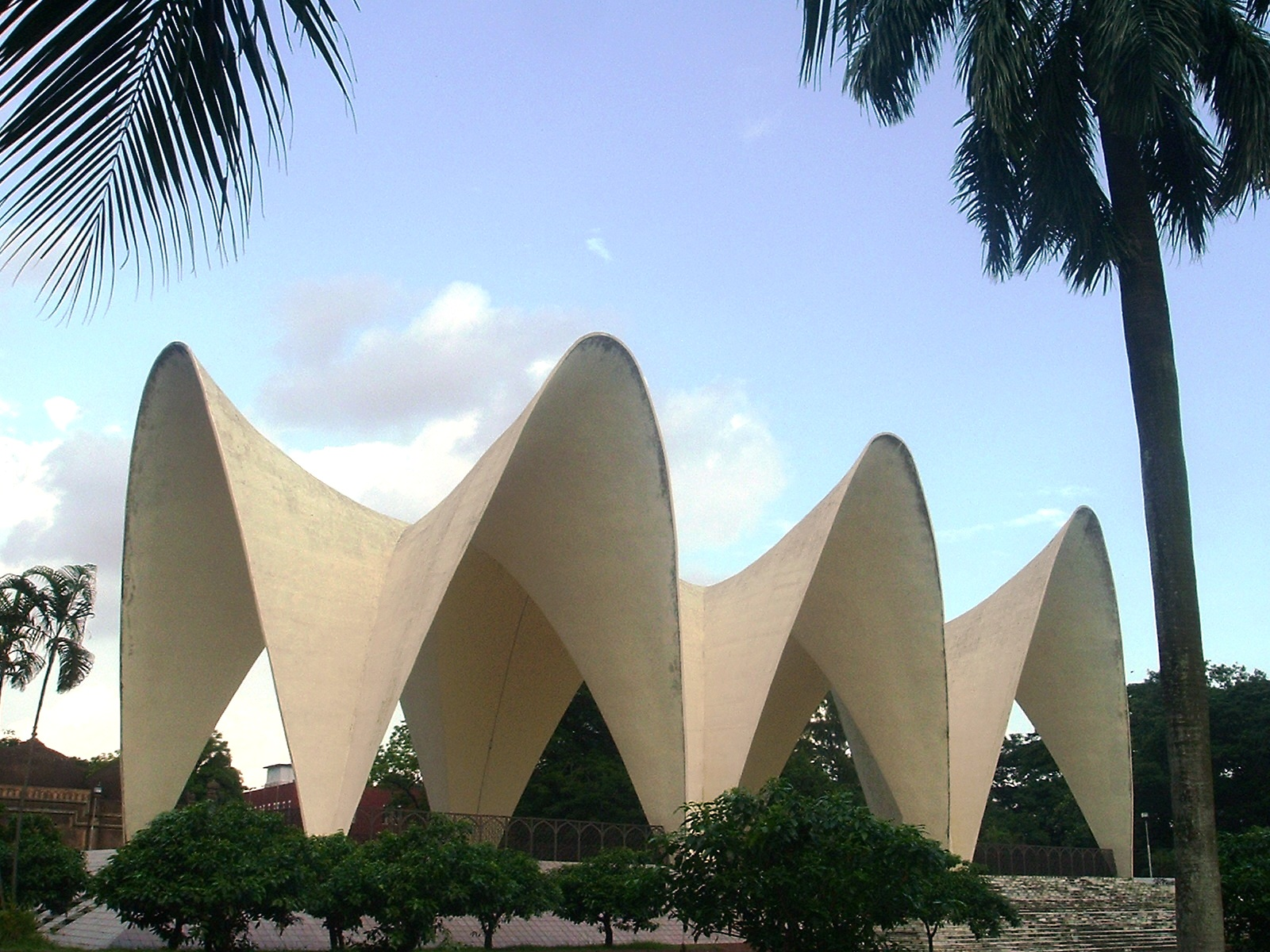
Afternoon view
