= Iluhar =

Iluhar ইলুহার
- Village
- Location in Bangladesh
- Coordinates: 22°48′N 90°06′E
- Country: Bangladesh
- Division: Barisal Division
- District: Barisal District
- Upazila: Banaripara Upazila

Population (2022)
  - Total: 10,159
- Time zone: UTC+6 (Bangladesh Time)

Iluhar is a village in Banaripara Upazila of Barisal District in the Barisal Division of southern-central Bangladesh.

According to the 2022 Census of Bangladesh, Iluhar had 2,474 households and a population of 10,159.
