= Gabha =

Gabha গাভা
- Village
- Location in Bangladesh
- Coordinates: 22°46′N 90°10′E
- Country: Bangladesh
- Division: Barisal Division
- District: Barisal District
- Upazila: Banaripara Upazila

Area
  - Total: 3.23 km^{2} (1.25 sq mi)

Population (2022)
  - Total: 3,252
  - Density: 1,010/km^{2} (2,610/sq mi)
- Time zone: UTC+6 (Bangladesh Time)

Gabha or Gava is a village in Banaripara Upazila of Barisal District in the Barisal Division of southern-central Bangladesh.

According to the 2022 Census of Bangladesh, Gabha had 809 households and a population of 3,252. It has a total area of 3.23 km^{2} (1.25 sq mi).
