= Syed Shahidul Huque Jamal =

Bangladeshi politician (died 2020)

Syed Shahidul Haque Jamal

Member of Parliament for Bakerganj Cum Pirojpur
- In office 27 February 1991 – 15 February 1996
- Preceded by: Manirul Islam
- Succeeded by: Seats abolished

Member of Parliament for Barisal Cum Pirojpur
- In office 15 February 1996 – 12 June 1996
- Preceded by: Seats start
- Succeeded by: A. K. Faezul Huq
- In office 1 October 2001 – 29 October 2006
- Preceded by: A. K. Faezul Huq
- Succeeded by: Seats abolished

Personal details
- Born: c. 1944
- Died: 18 March 2020 (aged 76)
- Party: Bangladesh Nationalist Party

Syed Shahidul Haque Jamal (c. 1944 – 18 March 2020) was a Bangladesh Nationalist Party politician and a member of parliament for Bakerganj Cum Pirojpur and Barisal Cum Pirojpur.

== Career ==
Jamal was elected to parliament from Bakerganj Cum Pirojpur as a Bangladesh Nationalist Party candidate in 1991. In July 1993, Bakerganj district became Barisal Division, which was divided into a number of districts including Barisal District. Jamal was elected from Barisal Cum Pirojpur in February 1996 and again in 2001. He served as the whip of the parliament.

== Death ==
Jamal died on 18 March 2020 in Mount Elizabeth Hospital, Singapore. He has left behind his wife, three sons, and one daughter.
