= Barisal Cum Pirojpur =

Constituency of Bangladesh's Jatiya Sangsad

- Former constituency for the Jatiya Sangsad
- District: Pirojpur District
- Division: Barisal Division

Former constituency
- Created: 1996
- Abolished: 2006

Barisal Cum Pirojpur is a defunct constituency represented in the Jatiya Sangsad (National Parliament) of Bangladesh abolished in 2006.

== Members of Parliament ==
Election	Member	Party
February 1996	Syed Shahidul Huque Jamal	Bangladesh Nationalist Party
June 1996	A. K. Faezul Huq	Awami League
2001	Syed Shahidul Huque Jamal	Bangladesh Nationalist Party
Abolished constituency
