= Bakerganj Cum Pirojpur =

Constituency of Bangladesh's Jatiya Sangsad

- Former constituency for the Jatiya Sangsad
- District: Pirojpur District
- Division: Barisal Division

Former constituency
- Created: 1988
- Abolished: 1996

Bakerganj Cum Pirojpur is a defunct constituency represented in the Jatiya Sangsad (National Parliament) of Bangladesh abolished in 2006.

== Members of Parliament ==
| Election | Member | Party |
|---|---|---|
| 1988 | Manirul Islam | Jatiya Party (Ershad) |
| 1991 | Syed Shahidul Huque Jamal | Bangladesh Nationalist Party |
Abolished constituency
