= A. K. Faezul Huq =

Bangladeshi politician, lawyer and journalist (1944–2007)

- এ কে ফায়জুল হক

Member of the Bangladesh Parliament for Bakerganj-XV
- In office 18 February 1979 – 24 March 1982
- Preceded by: Constituency established
- Succeeded by: Khitish Chandra Mondal

Member of the Bangladesh Parliament for Barisal Cum Pirojpur
- In office 12 June 1996 – 1 October 2001
- Preceded by: Syed Shahidul Huque Jamal
- Succeeded by: Syed Shahidul Huque Jamal

Personal details
- Born: c. 1944 Calcutta, Bengal Province, British India
- Died: 19 July 2007 (aged 62–63) Dhaka, Bangladesh
- Resting place: Banani, Dhaka
- Party: Awami League
- Other political affiliations: Bangladesh Nationalist Party (1979-1982)
- Spouse: Rukhsana Faez Huq
- Relations: Razia Banu (niece)
- Children: 3 daughters and 2 sons
- Parent: A. K. Fazlul Huq (father)
- Education: University of Dhaka
- Occupation: Lawyer; columnist; politician

Abul Kalam Faezul Huq (c. 1944 – 19 July 2007) (Note: Sources also transliterate his name in numerous other ways, including: Abul Qasem Faizul Huq (Banglapedia), A. K. Faizul Huq, A. K. Faiz-ul Huq, A. K. Faizul Haq, A. K. Foyzul Haque (votemonitor), and AK Fayzul Haque (bdnews24.com). There is also ambiguity about his date of birth. The obituaries in The Daily Star and New Age say 1943, whereas Banglapedia says 15 March 1944.) was a Bangladeshi politician, lawyer, and columnist. He was first elected as a member of the Pakistan National Assembly from the Nazirpur-Banaripara-Sharupkati constituency for the Awami League in 1970. He served two terms in the Bangladesh Parliament, where he was state minister for jute and textiles.

== Biography ==
=== Early life and education ===
Born in Calcutta c. 1944, Faezul Huq was the only son of A. K. Fazlul Huq, then prime minister of the undivided Bengal. Faezul attended St. Gregory's High School and Dhaka Notre Dame College. He earned a bachelor's degree in political science and a master's degree in English from the University of Dhaka. He completed his law degree at Central Law College in 1970.

=== Career ===
In 1969, Faezul Huq joined Notre Dame College, Dhaka, as a lecturer in political science.

Faezul Huq sought election to the Pakistan National Assembly as an Awami League candidate in the 1970 Pakistani general election. He was duly elected for Bakerganj-VIII (Nazirpur, Banaripara, and Sharupkati thanas). The assembly was not convened, however. The Bangladesh Liberation War broke out in March 1971. President Yahya Khan banned the Awami League, but in August announced that 88 members of the assembly from the defunct party, including Faezul Huq, would be allowed to retain their seats in their individual capacities. Bangladesh won its independence in December without the assembly being convened.

In 1979, he joined the Bangladesh Nationalist Party (BNP). In the 1979 Bangladeshi general election, he stood, successfully, for the Backerganj-XV constituency. President Abdus Sattar added him to his cabinet as a state minister during a reshuffle on 13 February 1982. Sattar's government fell the next month in the 1982 Bangladeshi coup d'état.

Faezul Huq returned to the Awami League, and to parliament in the June 1996 general election for Barisal Cum Pirojpur. (The new name for the constituency comprising Nazirpur=Banaripara-Sharupkati with which he had always been associated.) He was state minister for jute from 29 June to 15 July 2001 and state minister for textiles from 16 July 1996 to 31 December 1997. He stood for re-election in the 2001 Bangladeshi general election, losing to the BNP candidate.

Shortly after the 2001 election, the new government opened corruption cases against a number of individuals who had served in the outgoing government, including Faezul Huq.

Faezul Huq also worked as a columnist. He was associated in an executive capacity with a number of social and sports organizations, including the Lions Club of Bangladesh, Bangladesh Shooting Federation, and Brothers Union Club.

Huq with his wife, Rukhsana Huq (left) and his daughter-in-law (right).

=== Marriage and children ===
He married Rukhsana Faez Huq, and had three daughters and two sons.

=== Death ===
He died on 19 July 2007 in Baridhara, Dhaka. He was buried at Banani graveyard.

The Gregorian Association created a scholarship in his memory at St. Gregory's High School.
