= Guhathakurta family of Barisal =

Bengali family

Guhathakurta
- Country: India; British India; East Pakistan; Bangladesh

Borobari Guhathakurta

General information
- Architectural style: Indo-Saracenic Revival architecture
- Location: Banaripara, Barisal, Bangladesh

Guha Thakurta or Guhathakurta (pronounced [ˈɡuhoʈʰakuɾta]) is a British Raj era Zamindar family from Bengal Presidency.

== History ==
In 1889, Basanta Guhathakurta founded Banaripara Union Institution and requested his brother Rajoni Kanta Guhathakurta to take over the administration of the school. Rajoni Kanta agreed and joined the school as the first headmaster, resigning from the post of District Magistrate with the Government of British India. Currently, the school complex has been selected as a Model School by the Government of Bangladesh.

== See also ==
- Banaripara
- Bengali Hindus
