= Sher-E-Bangla Memorial Museum =

Sher-e-Bangla Memorial Museum
- শেরে বাংলা স্মৃতি জাদুঘর
- Established: 1982
- Location: Chakhar, Barisal District, Bangladesh
- Coordinates: 22.80704°N 90.19699°E
- Type: National history museum
- Collections: Sher-e-Bangla's personal belongings; photographs; archaeological artifacts
- Founder: Government of Bangladesh
- Owner: People's Republic of Bangladesh

Sher-e-Bangla Memorial Museum (Bengali: শেরে বাংলা স্মৃতি জাদুঘর) is located in Chakhar, Barisal District in Bangladesh, on land belonging to Chakhar Boys’ High School and Wazed Memorial Girls’ High School. The museum was established in memory of the British Bengal-born Pakistani statesman Sher-e-Bangla (also known as A. K. Fazlul Huq).

== History ==
In 1982, under the Ministry of Cultural Affairs, the Department of Archaeology began construction of the museum. Built on a part of Sher-e-Bangla’s homestead. The museum opened in 1983.

Initially, it held rare photographs, used furniture, letters, and a crocodile from the Sundarbans gifted to Sher-e-Bangla by Syed Anichuzzaman.

== Design ==
The building is 83 meters long and 14.60 meters wide. The museum has four rooms: two galleries, one office, and one library.

== Collections ==
At the entrance, to the left sits a large portrait of Sher-e-Bangla, a brief history of his life and works, social and political activities, family photograp, and newspaper clippings depicting his career.

Among the personal items of Fazlul Huq displayed in the museum are an armchair, wooden bed, mattress, clothes stand, dressing table, stool, chair and table, walking stick, drinking glasses, and other belongings. The museum exhibits archaeological relics such as an octagonal stone statue of Marichi Devi, a large black stone Shivalinga, a bronze Khasaparna Buddha statue, gold coins, a small white stone Shiva idol, embossed silver coins, and copper coins from Sri Lankan, British, and Sultanate periods.
