= Syed Azizul Huq =

Bangladeshi politician

Syed Azizul Haque Nanna Mia
- সৈয়দ আজিজুল হক

Member of the Jatiya Sangsad
- In office 7 May 1986 – 27 February 1991
- Constituency: Barisal-2

Member of the Constituent Assembly of Pakistan
- In office 1947–1954

Member of the East Bengal Legislative Assembly
- In office 1954–1960

Personal details
- Born: 1 October 1912 Chakhar, Bengal, British India
- Died: 11 February 1992 (aged 79) Dhaka, Bangladesh
- Party: Jatiya Party
- Other political affiliations: Krishak Praja Party

Syed Azizul Huq (Bengali: সৈয়দ আজিজুল হক; 1 October 1912 – 11 February 1992), also known by his nickname Nanna Mia (Bengali: নান্না মিঞা), was a Bangladeshi politician and former member of parliament for Barisal-2 in the 1986 and 1988 Bangladeshi general elections. He was a member of the Provincial Council of East Pakistan, minister of commerce and minister of industry.

== Early life and education ==
Azizul Huq was born on 1 October 1912 to a Bengali Muslim family known as the Syeds of Chakhar in the Sharif Bari of Chakhar, Banaripara, then located under the Backergunge District of the Bengal Province. His father, Syed Motahar Husayn, was descended from Syed Ataullah, who had inherited jagirs in the Barisal region after marrying Dulal Bibi, the daughter of Mir Qutb.

He graduated from Khalishakotha School in 1928 and later from Brojomohun College. In 1932, he received his Bachelor of Arts degree from Calcutta Islamia College. During his time there, he became one of the founders of the All-Bengal Muslim Students Association and served as the president of its college branch. Huq was also a member of the Student Council Cabinet and the secretary of sports at the college. He received a Bachelor of Law from the Calcutta Law College.

== Career ==
Azizul Huq joined the Calcutta Municipal Corporation and would go on to work as the private secretary of A. K. Fazlul Huq, the first and longest serving Prime Minister of Bengal during the British Raj and later a Chief Minister of East Bengal. Huq then joined the Industrial Museum in Calcutta (now Kolkata). While he worked he finished his law degree. He was also involved with the Krishak Praja Party and was member of its working committee. In 1951 he retired from government service. During the 1954 East Bengal Legislative Assembly election, he was elected from Jhalakathi-Wazirpur, Barisal as a candidate of the United Front alliance. He served the provincial government of A. K. Fazlul Huq as the minister for education. In 1955, he was made the minister of commerce and industry in the government of Abu Hussain Sarkar. He was a member of the Constituent Assembly and helped frame the Constitution of Pakistan in 1956.

Azizul Huq was involved in the movement against military dictator Ayub Khan in 1969. He founded the National Democratic Front and subsequently the Pakistan Democratic Party. Though he boycotted the 1970 Pakistan General elections in protest against the central government's failure to respond to the Bhola Cyclone in East Pakistan, during the Bangladesh Liberation War in 1971, he became a member of the East Pakistan Central Peace Committee. He returned to politics after 1975. He was elected to parliament in 1986 from Barisal-2 on a Jatiya Party nomination. In 1988 he was reelected to parliament. He served in the Dhaka District Lawyers' Association as the president, for four terms. He served the chairman of Anjuman Mufidul Islam and president of Rahmat-e-Alam Islam Mission's Dhaka branch. He established two orphanages for boys and girls.

== Death and legacy ==
Azizul Huq died on 11 February 1992 in Dhaka, Bangladesh. He was married, and had two sons.
