= Banaripara Municipality =

Municipality in Barisal, Bangladesh

Banaripara Municipality বানারীপাড়া পৌরসভা
- Municipality
- Interactive map of Banaripara Municipality
- Coordinates: 22.7827°N 90.1604°E
- Country: Bangladesh
- Division: Barisal
- Upazila: Banaripara

Area
  - Total: 3 km^{2} (1.2 sq mi)

Population
  - Total: 12,662
  - Density: 4,200/km^{2} (11,000/sq mi)

Banaripara Municipality (Bengali: বানারীপাড়া পৌরসভা) is a town in Banaripara Upazila, Barisal Division, Bangladesh.

== History ==
Banaripara Municipality was established on 25 September 1990.
