= A. K. Fazlul Huq =

Pakistani statesman and jurist (1873–1962)

Sher-e-Bangla Abul Kasem Fazlul Huq
- আবুল কাশেম ফজলুল হক
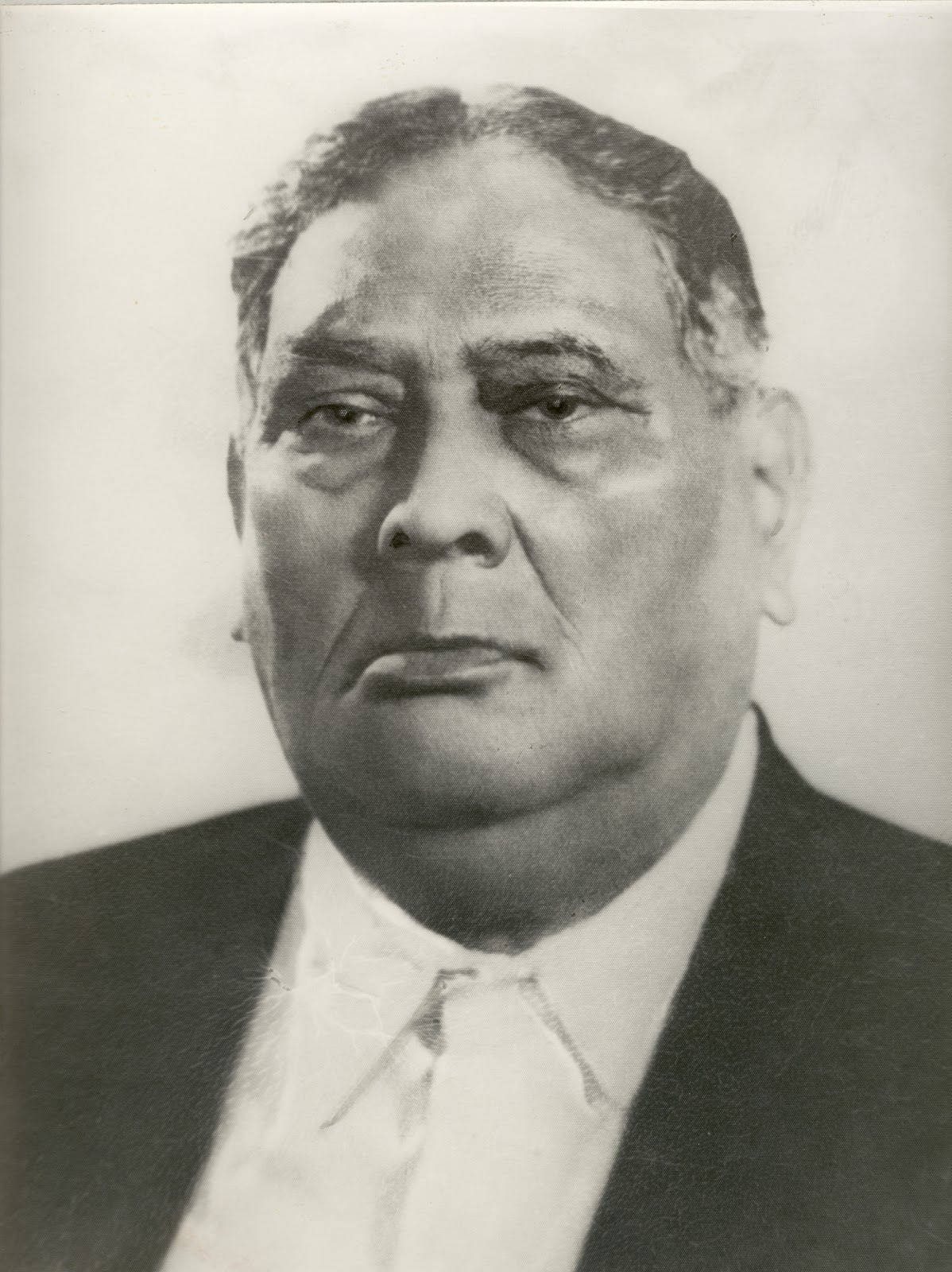
- Formal portrait, c. 1948

2nd Governor of East Pakistan
- In office 9 March 1956 – 13 April 1958
- President: Iskander Mirza
- Preceded by: Amiruddin Ahmad
- Succeeded by: Muhammad Hamid Ali (acting)

5th Interior Minister of Pakistan
- In office 11 August 1955 – 9 March 1956
- Governor-General: Iskander Mirza
- Prime Minister: Chaudhry Muhammad Ali
- Preceded by: Iskander Mirza
- Succeeded by: Abdus Sattar

3rd Chief Minister of East Bengal
- In office 3 April 1954 – 30 May 1954
- Governor: Chaudhry Khaliquzzaman; Iskander Mirza
- Preceded by: Nurul Amin
- Succeeded by: Abu Hussain Sarkar

1st Prime Minister of Bengal
- In office 1 April 1937 – 29 March 1943
- Governor General: Victor Hope, 2nd Marquess of Linlithgow
- Governor: John Anderson; Michael Knatchbull; John Herbert
- Preceded by: Office established
- Succeeded by: Khwaja Nazimuddin

Pre-independence roles
- 1913–1916: Secretary of Bengal Provincial Muslim League
- 1916–1921: President of All India Muslim League
- 1916–1918: General Secretary of the Indian National Congress
- 1924: Education Minister of Bengal
- 1935–1936: Mayor of Calcutta
- 1947–1952: Advocate-general of East Bengal

Personal details
- Born: Abul Kasem Fazlul Huq; 26 October 1873 Backergunge, Bengal Presidency, British India
- Died: 27 April 1962 (aged 88) Dacca, East Pakistan, Pakistan
- Resting place: Mausoleum of Three Leaders
- Party: Krishak Sramik Party (1958–1962)
- Other political affiliations: All India Muslim League (1906-1915); Indian National Congress (1915-1929); Krishak Praja Party (1929–1947); Muslim League (1947-1953); United Front (1953-1958)
- Spouses: Khurshid Talat Begum (m. 1902; div. 1922) Jannatunnesa Begum (m. 1922; died 1942) Khadija Begum (m. 1943)
- Children: 2 daughters and A. K. Faezul Huq
- Relatives: Razia Banu (granddaughter)
- Education: Presidency College, Calcutta; University of Calcutta
- Occupation: Lawyer; author; politician

Abul Kasem Fazlul Huq (Note: Bengali: আবুল কাশেম ফজলুল হক, romanised: Ābul Kāśēm Fôjlul Hôk, Bengali pronunciation: [ˈabul ˈkaˌʃem ˈfod͡ʒlul ˈɦɔːk]) (26 October 1873 – 27 April 1962), popularly known as Sher-e-Bangla, (Note: Bengali: শেরে বাংলা, romanised: Śērē Bāṅlā, lit. 'Tiger of Bengal', Bengali pronunciation: [ˈʃeːre ˈbaŋla]) was a Bengali statesman, lawyer, and politician who served as the first and longest-serving prime minister of Bengal during the British Raj. He presented the Lahore Resolution in 1940, the foundational document of the Pakistan Movement, for which he is regarded as one of the Founding Fathers of Pakistan.

Born in 1873 to a Bengali Muslim family in British Bengal, Huq held important political offices in the subcontinent, including president of the All India Muslim League (1916–1921), general secretary of the Indian National Congress (1916–1918), education minister of Bengal (1924), mayor of Calcutta (1935), prime minister of Bengal (1937–1943), advocate general of East Bengal (1947–1952), chief minister of East Bengal (1954), home minister of Pakistan (1955–1956), and governor of East Pakistan (1956–1958). He was first elected to the Bengal Legislative Council from Dhaka in 1913; and served on the council for 21 years until 1934.

Huq was a key figure in the Indian independence movement and then the Pakistan movement. In 1919, he had the unique distinction of concurrently serving as president of the All India Muslim League and general secretary of the Indian National Congress. He was also a member of the Congress Party's committee enquiring into the Amritsar massacre. Fazlul Huq was a member of the Central Legislative Assembly from 1934 to 1936. Between 1937 and 1947, he was an elected member of the Bengal Legislative Assembly, where he was prime minister and leader of the house for six years. After partition, he was elected to the East Bengal Legislative Assembly, where he was chief minister for two months.

Huq boycotted titles and a knighthood granted by the British government. He was notable for his English oratory during speeches to the Bengali legislature. He courted the votes of the Bengali middle classes and rural communities. He pushed for land reform and curbing the influence of zamindars. As prime minister, Huq used legal and administrative measures to reduce the debt of millions of farmers subjected to tenancy under the Permanent Settlement. He was considered a leftist and social democrat on the political spectrum. His ministries were marked by intense factional infighting.

In 1940, Huq had one of his most notable political achievements when he presented the Lahore Resolution which called for the creation of a sovereign state in the Muslim-majority eastern and northwestern parts of British India. During the Second World War, Huq joined the Viceroy of India's Defence Council and supported the Allied war efforts. Under pressure from the governor of Bengal during the Quit India movement and after the withdrawal of the Hindu Mahasabha from his cabinet, Huq resigned from the post of premier in March 1943. In the Dominion of Pakistan, Huq worked for five years as East Bengal's attorney general and participated in the Bengali language movement. He was elected as chief minister, served as a federal minister and was a provincial governor in the late 1950s.

Fazlul Huq died in Dacca, East Pakistan (now Dhaka, Bangladesh) on 27 April 1962 at age 88. He is buried with Khwaja Nazimuddin and Huseyn Shaheed Suhrawardy in the Mausoleum of Three Leaders. Sher-e-Bangla Nagar, where the National Parliament is located, is named in his honour. His son, A. K. Faezul Huq, was a Bangladeshi politician.

== Early life and family ==
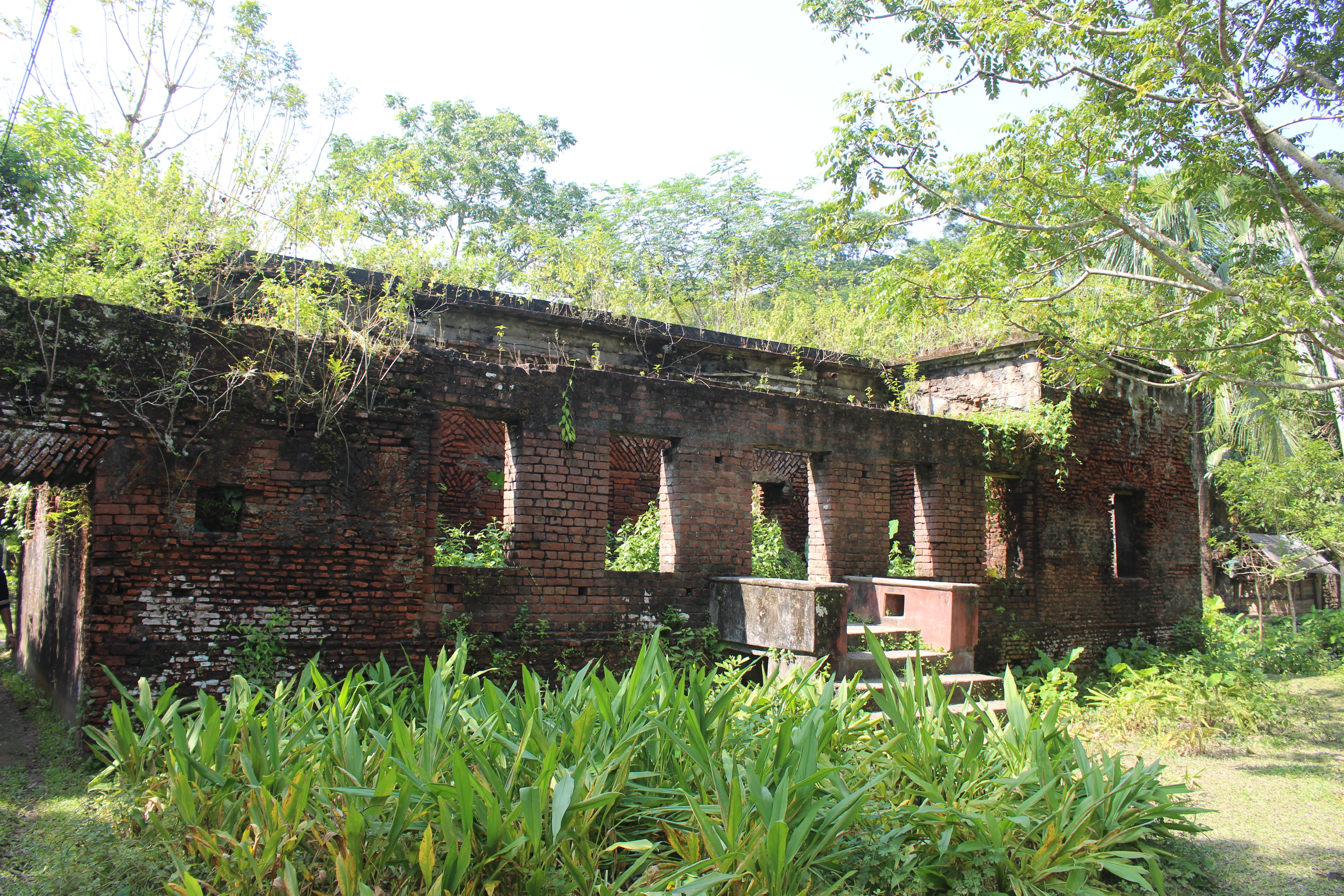
Huq's birthplace, the Saturia Mia Bari at Rajapur Upazila, of Jhalokati District

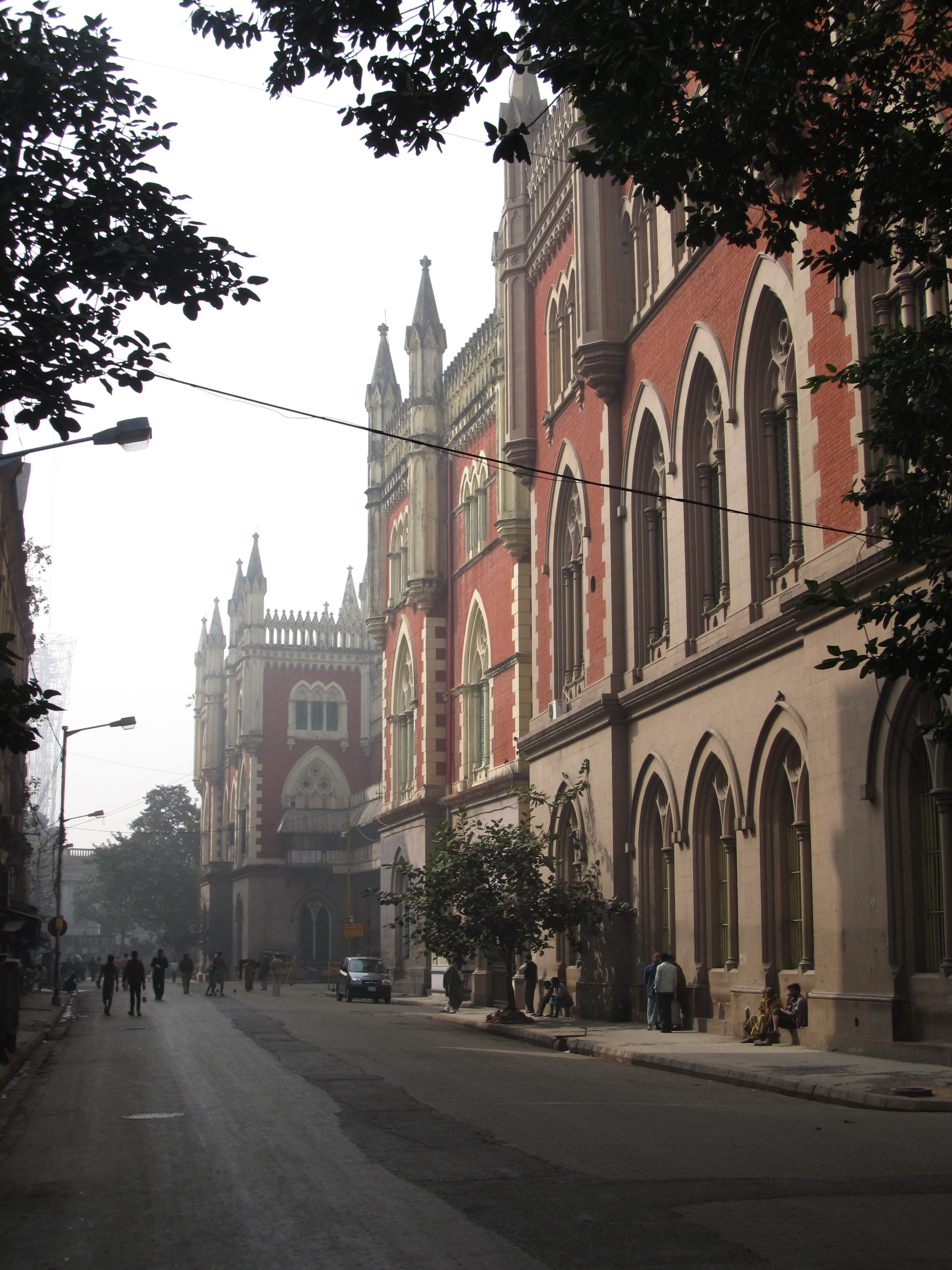
The Calcutta High Court, where Huq practised law for over 40 years

Abul Kasem Fazlul Huq was born on 26 October 1873 at his maternal family home, the Mia Bari of Saturia in Backergunge District of the Bengal Presidency (now in Barsial, Bangladesh). He belonged to a Bengali Muslim family of Qadis hailing from Bilbilash in Bauphal, Patuakhali. His father, Qazi Muhammad Wajid, was a well-regarded lawyer of the Barisal Bar, and his grandfather, Qazi Akram Ali, also worked in the Barisal Court and was a Mukhtar as well as a scholar of the Arabic and Persian languages.

== Education ==
Initially home schooled by Shamsul Ulama Khan Bahadur Hedayet Hossain and Allamah Abdur Rahman Kashgari, he later attended the Barisal Zilla School, where he passed the FA Examination in 1890. Huq moved to Calcutta for higher education. He sat for his bachelor's degree exam in 1894, earning triple honours in chemistry, mathematics, and physics from the Presidency College (now Presidency University). He then obtained a master's degree in mathematics from the University of Calcutta in 1896. He obtained his Bachelor of Laws from the University Law College in Calcutta in 1897.

== Civil servant and lawyer ==
From 1908 to 1912, Huq was the assistant registrar of co-operatives. He resigned from the public service and opted for public life and law. Based on advice from Sir Ashutosh Mukherjee, he joined the bar council of the Calcutta High Court and started a legal practice. He practised in the Calcutta High Court for 40 years.

== Legislator and Indian independence movement ==
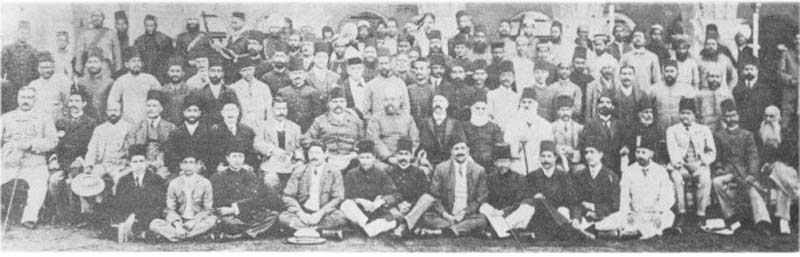
Huq joined the All India Muhammadan Education Conference in Dhaka in 1906, which founded the All-India Muslim League.

Huq became secretary of the Bengal Provincial Muslim League in 1913. After the First Partition of Bengal, Huq attended the All India Muhammadan Educational Conference hosted by Sir Khwaja Salimullah in Dacca, the capital of Eastern Bengal and Assam. The conference led to the formation of the All-India Muslim League. The annulment of the partition led to the formation of the Bengal Provincial Muslim League, in which Huq became secretary. With the patronage of Sir Salimullah and Syed Nawab Ali Chowdhury, he was elected to the Bengal Legislative Council from the Dacca Division in 1913.

In 1916, Huq was elected president of the All-India Muslim League, one of those who was instrumental in formulating the Lucknow Pact of 1916 between the Indian National Congress and the Muslim League. In 1917, he was a Joint Secretary of the Indian National Congress and from 1918 to 1919 he served as its general secretary. He was the only person to concurrently hold the presidency of the League and the general secretary's position in the Congress. In 1918, Huq presided over the Delhi Session of the All-India Muslim League. In 1919, he was chosen as a member of the Punjab Enquiry Committee along with Motilal Nehru, Chittaranjan Das and other prominent leaders which was set up by the Indian National Congress to investigate the Amritsar massacre. Huq was the president of the Midnapore Session of the Bengal Provincial Conference in 1920.

During the Khilafat movement, Huq led the pro-British faction within the Bengal Provincial Muslim League, while his rival, Maniruzzaman Islamabadi, led the pro-Ottoman faction. Huq differed with the Congress leadership during its non-cooperation movement and favoured working within the constitutional framework rather than boycotting legislatures and colleges. He later resigned from the Congress. In 1923, Huq served as education minister of Bengal for six months under the dyarchy system. In 1929, he founded the All Bengal Tenants Association, which evolved into a political platform, including as a part of the post-partition United Front.

== Prime Minister of Bengal ==
=== First Premiership (1937-1941) ===
The dyarchy was replaced by provincial autonomy in 1935, with the first general elections held in 1937. Huq transformed the All Bengal Tenants Association into the Krishak Praja Party. During the election campaign period, Huq emerged as a major populist figure in Bengal. His party won 35 seats in the Bengal Legislative Assembly in the 1937 Indian provincial elections. It was the third largest party after the Bengal Congress and Bengal Provincial Muslim League. Huq formed a coalition with the Bengal Provincial Muslim League and independent legislators. He was elected as the leader of the house and the first prime minister of Bengal.

==== Cabinet ====
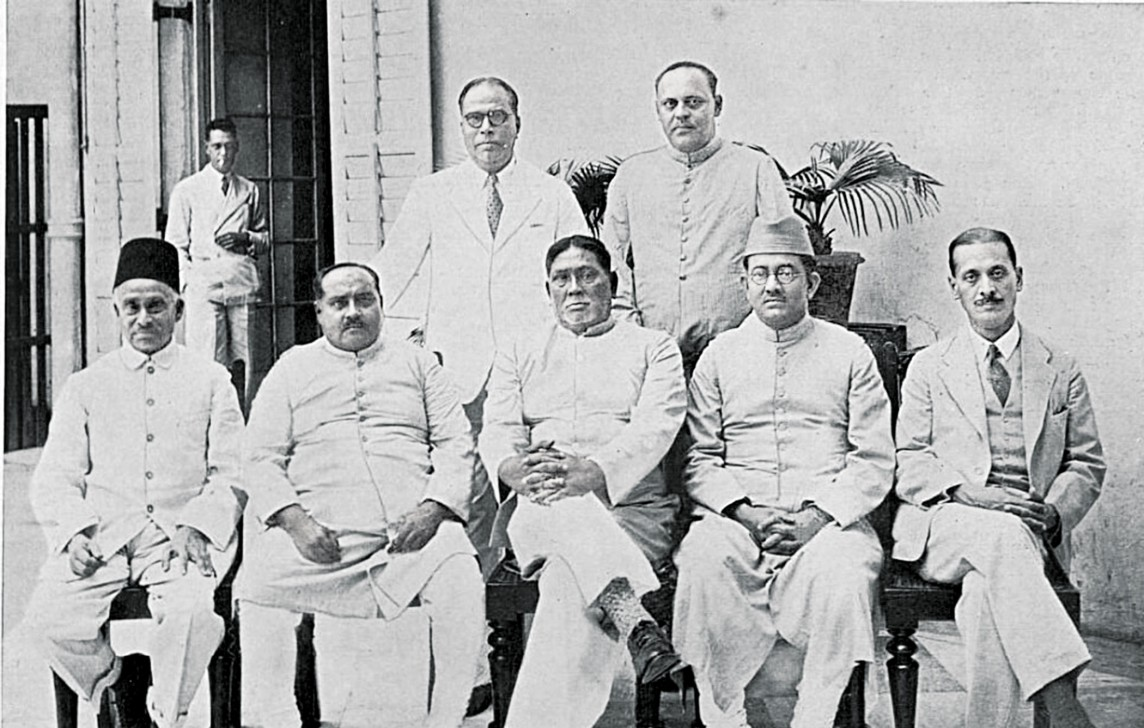
Huq's first cabinet in 1937

Huq's cabinet included Nalini Ranjan Sarkar (finance), Bijoy Prasad Singh Roy (revenue), Maharaja Srish Chandra Nandy (communications and public works), Prasanna Deb Raikut (forest and excise), Mukunda Behari Mallick (cooperative credit and rural indebtedness), Sir Khwaja Nazimuddin (home), Nawab Khwaja Habibullah (agriculture and industry), Huseyn Shaheed Suhrawardy (commerce and labour), Nawab Musharraf Hussain (judicial and legislative), and Syed Nausher Ali (public health and local self-government).

==== Debt relief and Permanent Settlement ====
Under Huq, the Bengal government used administrative and legal measures to relieve the debt of millions of tenant farmers under the zamindari system of the Permanent Settlement. Huq hailed from a middle class zamindar family. as had many of his colleagues. But Huq represented a new generation of Bengali middle-class political consciousness which won support among both Bengali Muslims and Bengali Hindus. The Krishak Praja Party promoted land reform. Huq's tenure saw the enactment of the Bengal Agricultural Debtors' Act (1938), the Money Lenders' Act (1938), and the Bengal Tenancy (Amendment) Act (1938). Debt Settlement Boards were created in all districts.

The Land Revenue Commission, appointed by the government of Bengal on 5 November 1938 with Sir Francis Floud as chairman, submitted its final report on 21 March 1940. This was a valuable document relating to the land system of the country. The Tenancy Act of 1885 was amended by suspending rent provisions for ten years. Huq abolished informal taxes imposed traditionally by the zamindars on tenants. The tenants obtained the right to transfer their tenancy without paying any transfer fee to the zamindars. The law reduced the interest rate for arrears of rent from 12.50% to 6.25%. The tenants also obtained the right to gain possession of the nadi sekasti (land lost through river erosion which then reappeared) by payment of four years' rent within twenty years of the erosion. These measures resulted in debt relief for millions of Bengali peasants. However, he failed to fully implement his rice and lentils program which he campaigned for during the 1937 election.

==== Lahore Resolution ====
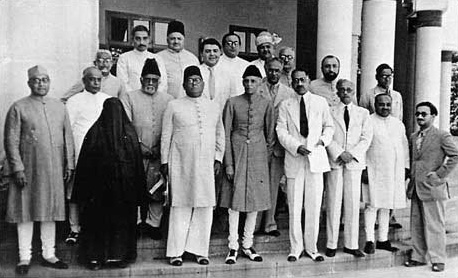
The Working Committee of the Lahore Resolution in 1940. Prime Minister Huq is standing beside M. A. Jinnah (third from left on the bottom row)

A seminal moment in Huq's political career was the adoption of the Lahore Resolution. The resolution was passed by the All-India Muslim League at its annual session in Lahore on 23 March 1940. When Huq arrived at the Lahore meeting, Muhammad Ali Jinnah remarked "When the tiger [Huq] appears, the lamb [Jinnah] must give way". Huq formally proposed the resolution at the annual session. The resolution called for Muslim-majority provinces in British India to be grouped into "Independent States in which the constituent units shall be autonomous and sovereign". The initial wording of the resolution suggested that the Muslim League wanted multiple states instead of a single state. Huq later accused Jinnah of not working hard enough to ensure an undivided Bengal with Calcutta included. There have been varying interpretations of the Lahore Resolution ever since. One interpretation is that the plural spelling of 'states' indicated Huq had sought a separate Muslim-majority state covering Bengal and parts of Assam as early as the 1940s.

==== Education ====
Huq held the education portfolio in his cabinet. He introduced the Primary Education Bill in the Bengal Legislative Assembly, which was passed into law and made primary education free and compulsory. However, there was a storm of protests from the opposition members and the press when Huq introduced the Secondary Education Bill in the assembly as it incorporated 'principles of communal division in the field of education' at the secondary stage. He was a supporter of affirmative action for Bengali Muslims. Huq was associated with the foundation of many educational institutions in Bengal, including Calcutta's Islamia College and Lady Brabourne College, Wajid Memorial Girls' High School, and Chakhar College.

==== Rift with the Muslim League ====
In 1941, Huq joined the Viceroy's Defence Council, which was formed to oversee the war effort of British India during World War II. Huq was joined by Sir Sikandar Hayat Khan, the Prime Minister of the Punjab. The growing influence of provincial Muslim League leaders like Huq and Khan was resented by Jinnah. The Muslim League leadership, led by Jinnah and his allies, demanded that both the Bengal and Punjab PMs withdraw from the Defence Council. Khan eventually complied, but Huq refused. The breakdown in relations between Huq and Jinnah led to Huq's ouster from the Muslim League. Jinnah's allies in Bengal thereafter worked to bring down Huq's government. Jinnah felt the Defence Council was tilted towards the Congress. On 2 December 1941, Huq resigned and Governor's rule was imposed.

=== Second Premiership (1941-1943) ===
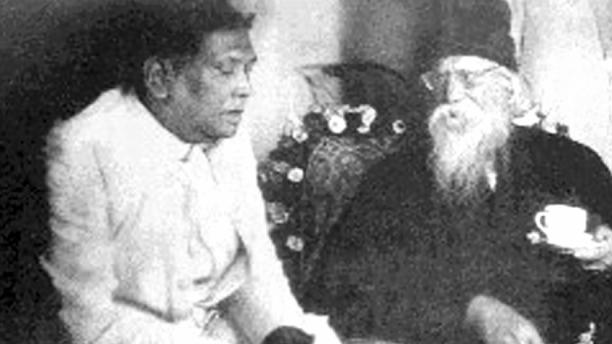
Huq with Rabindranath Tagore

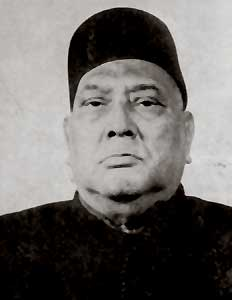
Huq in his trademark Fez cap

The second Huq coalition government was formed on 12 December 1941. The coalition was supported by most members in the Bengal Legislative Assembly, except for the Muslim League. Supporters included the secular faction of the Krishak Praja Party led by Shamsuddin Ahmed, the Forward Bloc founded by Subhash Chandra Bose, pro-Bose members of the Bengal Congress and the Hindu Mahasabha led by Syama Prasad Mukherjee.

==== Cabinet ====
The cabinet included Nawab Bahadur Khwaja Habibullah, Khan Bahadur Abdul Karim, Khan Bahadur Hashem Ali Khan, Shamsuddin Ahmed, Syama Prasad Mukherjee, Santosh Kumar Bose, and Upendranath Barman.

==== Tensions with the Governor and WWII ====
Despite Huq enjoying the confidence of most of the assembly, he had tense relations with the Governor of Bengal, John Herbert. The governor favoured the provincial Muslim League leaders and patrons, including Sir Khawaja Nazimuddin, the Leader of the Opposition; and the "Calcutta Trio" in the assembly (Abul Hassan Isphani, Khwaja Nooruddin and Abdur Rahman Siddiqui). The focal point of the League's campaign against Huq was that he was growing closer to Syama Prasad Mukherjee of the Hindu Mahasabha, who was alleged to be working against the political and religious interests of the Muslims. The League appealed to the governor to dismiss the Huq ministry.

The fear of a Japanese invasion during the Burma Campaign and the implementation by the military of a 'denial policy' implemented in 1942 caused considerable hardship to the delta region. A devastating cyclone and tidal waves whipped the coastal region on 26 October, but relief efforts were hindered due to bureaucratic interference. On 3 August, a number of prisoners were shot in Dhaka jail. However, no inquiry could be held due to bureaucratic intervention. Another severe strain on the administration was caused when the Congress launched the Quit India movement on 9 August, which was followed by British political repression. The entire province reverberated with protest. The situation was further complicated when Mukherjee resigned, bitterly complaining about the interference of the governor in the work of the ministry. Huq also called for the resurrection of the Bengal Army.

On 15 March 1943, the Prime Minister disclosed on the floor of the Assembly that on several occasions, under the guise of discretionary authority, the governor disregarded the advice tendered by the ministry and listed those occasions. The governor did not take those allegations kindly, and, largely due to his initiative, no-confidence motions were voted in the assembly on 24 March and 27 March. On both occasions, the motions were defeated, although by narrow margins. To enforce his writ, the governor asked Huq to sign a prepared letter of resignation on 28 March 1943 and assigned himself the responsibility of administering the province under the provision of Section 92 of the constitution. A month later a League-dominated ministry was commissioned with Nazimuddin as the Prime Minister. Huq bitterly criticised John Herbert for forcing his resignation and imposing Governor's rule, calling it "an outrage on the Constitution". Huq criticised the colonial bureaucracy's role against his government, stating that "the steel frame of the Imperial Service" made a mockery of the authority of the elected government of Bengal.

Huq accused John Herbert of being an ignorant administrator, stating "After all, even busy Governors absent themselves from town on private business". Huq quoted Henry Wadsworth Longfellow, who had paraphrased the ancient Greek philosopher Plutarch, stating "The mills of God grind slowly but they grind exceeding small; and sooner perhaps than Sir John Herbert or the supporters of the Ministers may think, Nemesis will overtake those who [Nazimuddin] had rushed to office not to serve the people but to enjoy the sweets of power emoluments". Huq's party won significantly fewer seats during the 1946 Indian provincial elections in which the Muslim League led by Huseyn Shaheed Suhrawardy triumphed.

== Political career in Pakistan ==
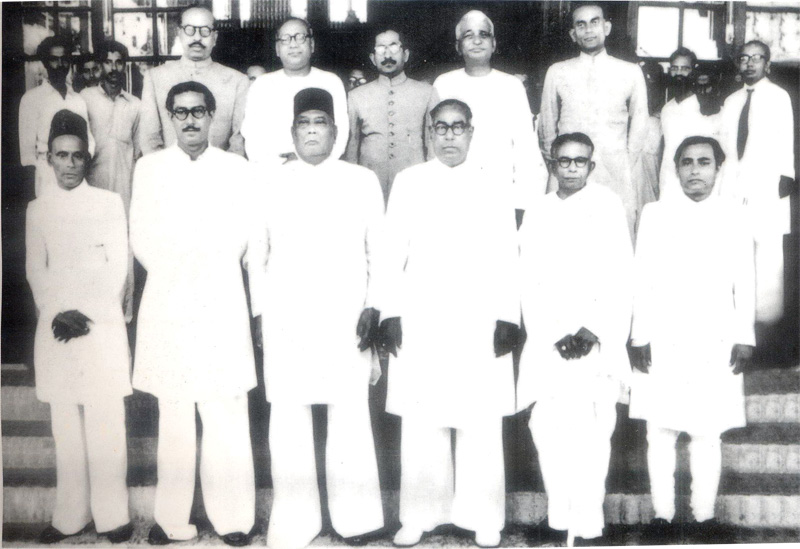
Huq's short-lived cabinet in East Bengal, which included Sheikh Mujibur Rahman (standing beside Huq; 2nd from left on bottom row)

=== Opposition leader and language movement ===
After the partition of British India, Huq settled in Dhaka and became the attorney general of the government of East Bengal. He served in this position between 1947 and 1952. Huq was active in the civil society and social life of Dhaka. On 31 December 1948, while delivering a presidential address at a literary conference, Huq proposed a language academy for the Bengali language. He supported the Bengali language movement in 1952. Huq was injured during police action against demonstrators demanding that Bengali be made a state language of Pakistan. Huq emerged as one of the principal opposition leaders against the Pakistan Muslim League. East Bengal became the epicentre of Pakistan's political opposition. The Bengalis of East Bengal were the demographic majority of the Dominion of Pakistan.

=== In government ===
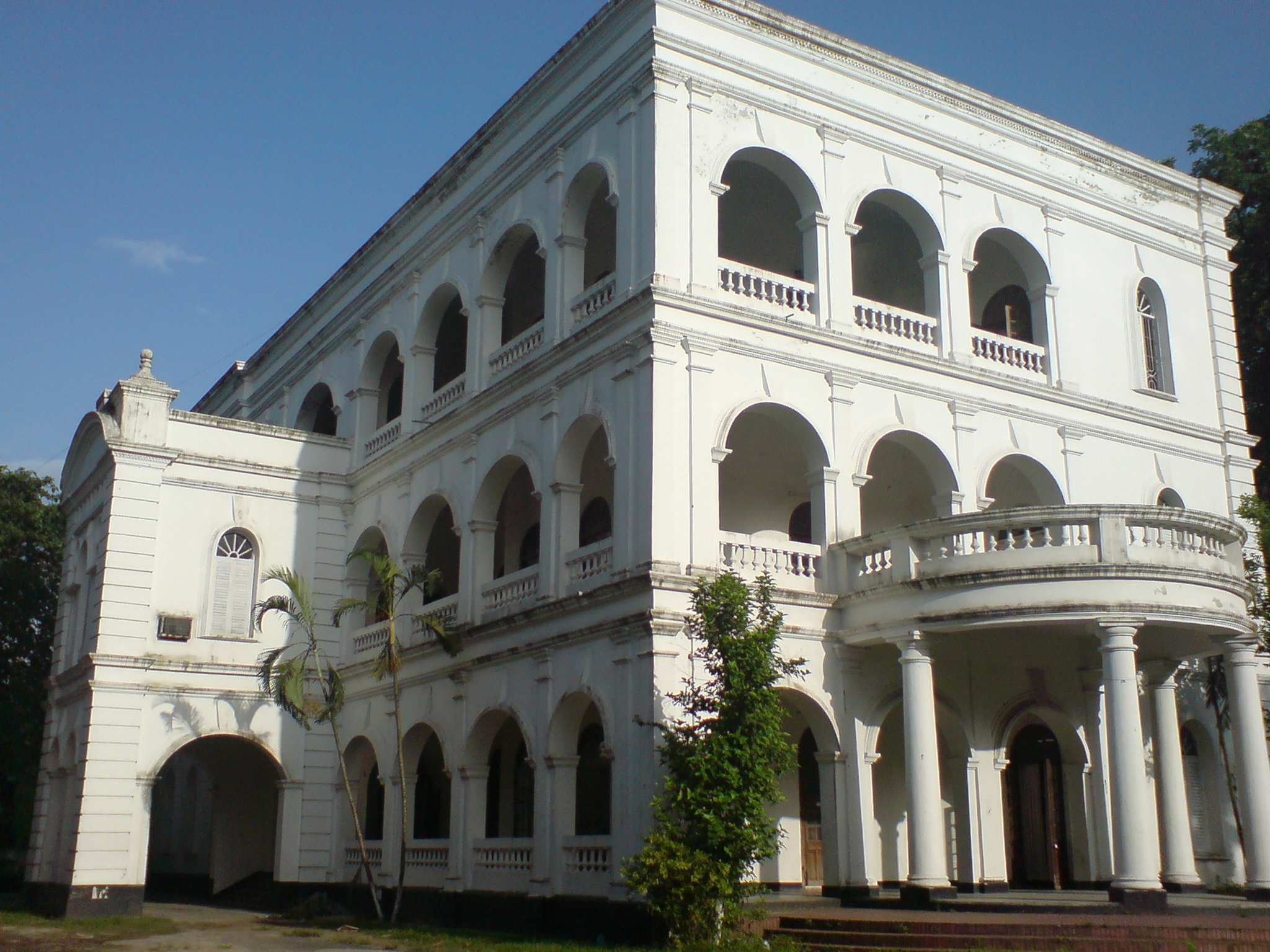
Huq spearheaded efforts to establish the Bangla Academy, the first institutionalised language regulatory authority of the Bengali language

The East Bengali legislative election, 1954 was the first major democratic election in Pakistan's history. Huq was the leader of the opposition United Front alliance, which included his Krishak Sramik Party, the Awami League, the Ganatantri Dal and the Nizam-e-Islam Party. Huq toured the districts of East Bengal extensively during the election campaign. He was joined by Awami League leader Huseyn Shaheed Suhrawardy and Suhrawardy's protege Sheikh Mujibur Rahman. Maulana Bhashani also supported Huq. Suhrawardy and Huq jointly campaigned in several districts, including Faridpur. The United Front won a landslide victory during the 1954 election. The Muslim League was routed and reduced to only a few seats in the East Bengal Legislative Assembly. Huq defeated his archrival Sir Khawaja Nazimuddin in the constituency of Patuakhali in Barisal.

Huq served as Chief Minister for two months. During his short lived government, he took measures to establish the Bangla Academy. Governor General's rule was imposed which ended Huq's leadership of the provincial government. Pakistan's political parties continued to squabble, particularly over power sharing between the provinces. In August 1955, a coalition between the Krishak Sramik Party in East Pakistan and the Muslim League in West Pakistan allowed Chaudhry Mohammad Ali to become prime minister and Huq to become Home Minister.

The first constitution of Pakistan was enacted under this coalition in March 1956. The coalition was later dismissed by President Iskander Mirza, who in turn allowed a coalition of the Awami League and Republican Party to form government. Huq's former ally Suhrawardy became prime minister. As a result, the Krishak Sramik Party and the Muslim League formed the main opposition. Huq and Surhawardy were once again on opposite ends. Huq was appointed Governor of East Pakistan in 1956. He served in the position for two years until the 1958 Pakistani coup d'état. The coup ended the dominance of Huq, Suhrawardy, and Nazimuddin in Bengali politics.

== Writings ==
Huq wrote the book Bengal Today, which was translated into Bengali. He was one of three owner-cum-directors of the well regarded evening daily Nabajug which came often under British-Indian government's proscription due to its anti-imperialist premise. The paper is no longer published.

== Notable quotations ==
=== Quotes by Fazlul Huq ===
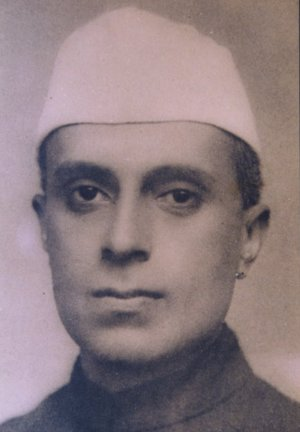
Jawaharlal Nehru was Huq's political secretary between 1918 and 1919

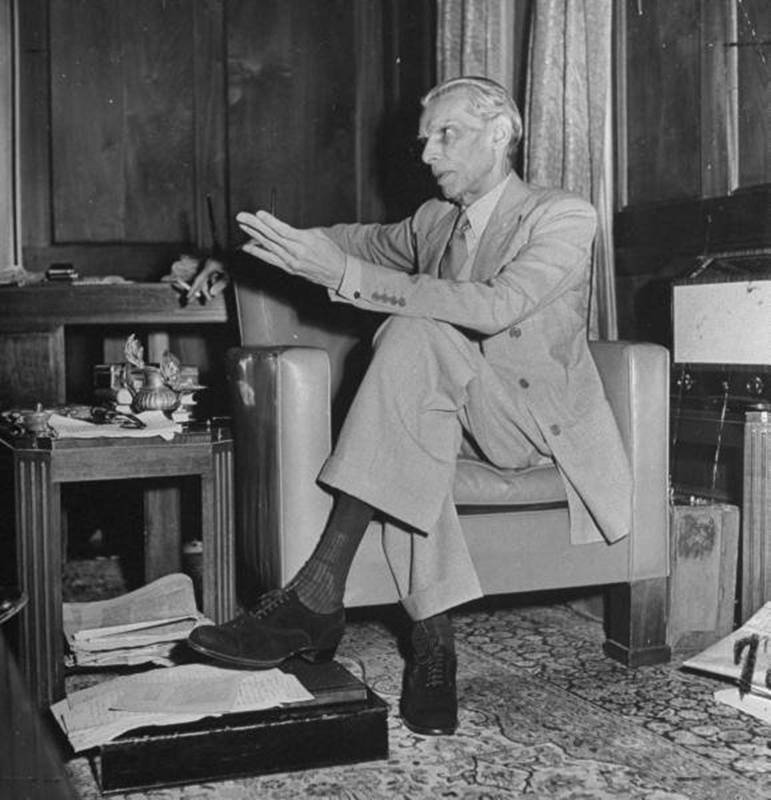
In 1940, Muhammad Ali Jinnah facetiously compared Huq to a tiger and himself as a lamb. Huq's support was crucial for the Lahore Resolution. The two men often differed and disagreed.

- "Someday sooner or later, they will be humbled to dust even; as tyrants and oppressors of humanity have met their doom in the chequered history of mankind."
  — Fazlul Huq's criticism of the British Raj
- "A Budget, whose figures in cold print, creep through the marrow of our bones till we stand aghast at the national calamity with which we are faced."
  — Fazlul Huq's speech on the Bengal famine of 1943 during a budget session of the Bengal Legislative Assembly
- "I want you to consent to the formation of a Bengali Army of a hundred thousand young Bengalis consisting of Hindu and Muslim youths on a fifty-fifty basis. There is an insistent demand for such a step to be taken at once, and the people of Bengal will not be satisfied with any excuses. It is a national demand which must be immediately conceded."
  — Writing to Governor John Herbert regarding demands for forming a Bengal Army during World War II
- "Administrative measures must be suited to the genius and traditions of the people and not fashioned according to the whims and caprices of hardened bureaucrats, to many of whom autocratic ideas are bound up with the very breath of their lives."
  — In a letter to the Governor of Bengal
- "They were lions in their own days and we have the descendants of the lions of Indian journalism in our midst today. But the difference between the two classes of lions is very significant. Those were lions whose roars used to reverberate from Bengal across the seven seas to the homes of the British nation, but in the case of the present lions they are as docile as lions in a circus show. The roar of the lions of old used to make thrones tremble, but most of the present lions only know how to crouch beneath the throne and wag their tails in approbation of government policy."
  — Commenting on critical journalists on the floor of the Bengal Legislative Assembly
- "Mr Speaker, I can jolly well face the music, but I cannot face a monkey. Mr. Speaker, I never mentioned any honourable member of this House. But if any honourable member thinks that the cap fits him, I withdraw my remark."
  — A controversial remark against an opponent in the Bengal Legislative Assembly
- "I am the living history of Bengal and East Pakistan of the last sixty years. I am the last survivor of that band of unselfish and courageous Muslims who fought fearlessly against terrific odds..."
  — On his role in the politics of Bengal (particularly Bangladesh)

=== Quotes about Fazlul Huq ===
- "Exceptionally brilliant, equipped with a sharp memory, deep knowledge and ability to understand peoples' feelings and characters with sharp wit and speech that provokes Bengali people's emotion."
  — Hussain Shaheed Suhrawardy
- "When the tiger appears, the lamb must give way."
  — Muhammad Ali Jinnah
- "He who in 1943 had wanted to see Nazimuddin and Suhrawardy bite the dust now shares the same stretch of the earth with them. All three are buried, side by side, in the grounds of the Dhaka High Court. For a while, the two of them were called Prime Ministers of Pakistan. Fazlul Huq was not. But only he was spoken of as the Royal Bengal Tiger."
  — Rajmohan Gandhi

== Personal life ==
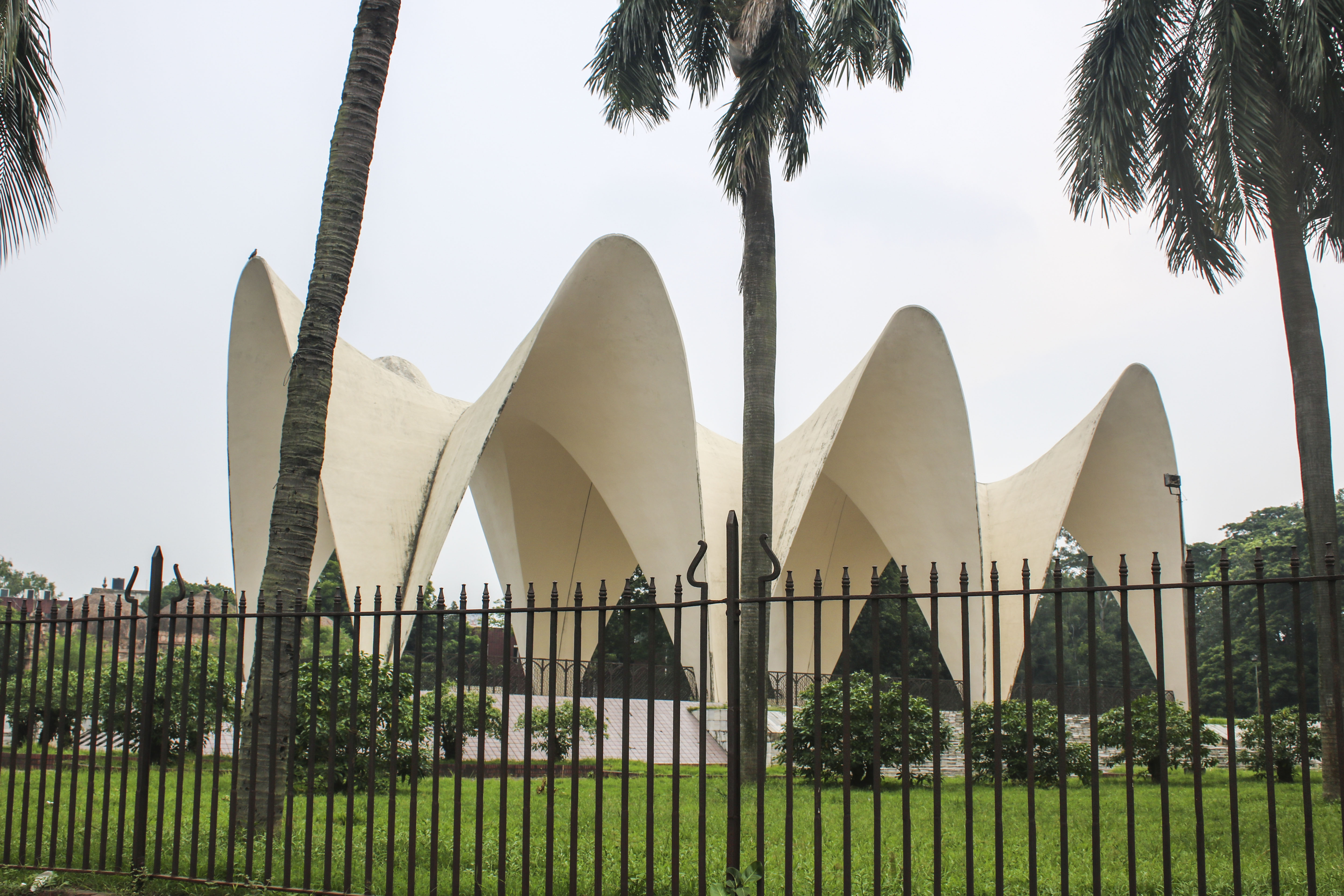
Huq is buried in the Mausoleum of Three Leaders

Huq was married three times. His first wife was Khurshid Talat Begum, the daughter of Nawab Syed Muhammad Azad and granddaughter of Nawab Abdul Latif, with whom he had two daughters. Khurshid left him and obtained a maintenance allowance in court. His second wife was Musammat Jannatunissa Begum, daughter of Ibn Ahmad of Hooghly, but she died without having any children. In 1943, he married Khadija Begum of Meerut, located in the United Provinces. Their son, A. K. Faezul Huq, served as a member of Pakistan National Assembly and later, Jatiya Sangsad of Bangladesh. Huq's daughter, Nafisa Begum, was married to one of his nephews, Wazir Ali.

Among Huq's grandchildren, Razia Banu was a Bangladesh Awami League politician and a Jatiya Sangsad member during 1973–1976, and Fersamin Haque Iqbal Flora competed at the 2026 Bangladeshi general election as a member of National Citizen Party.

Huq was fluent in English, Arabic, Bengali, Urdu, and Persian.

== Legacy ==
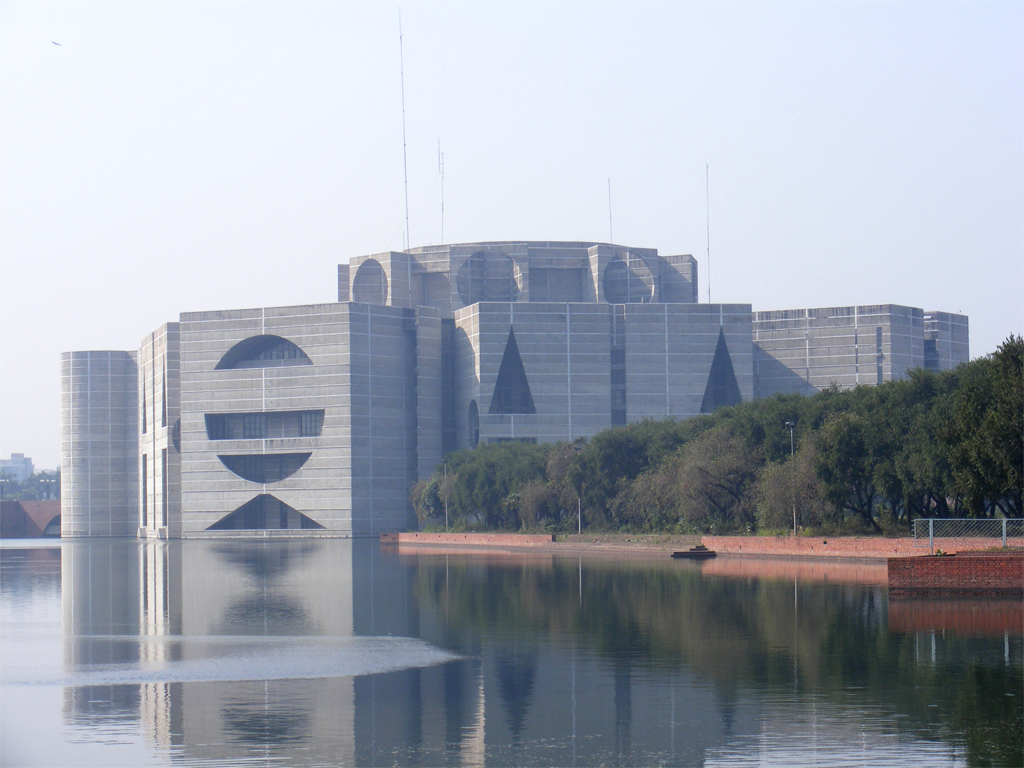
Sher-e-Bangla Nagar, which houses the Parliament of Bangladesh, is named in honour of Huq

Fazlul Huq founded several educational and technical institutions for Bengali Muslims, including Islamia College in Calcutta, Baker Hostel and Carmichael hostel residence halls for Muslim students of the University of Calcutta, Lady Brabourne College, Adina Fazlul Huq College in Rajshahi, Eliot hostel, Tyler Hostel, Medical College hostel, Engineering College hostel, Muslim Institute Building, Dhaka Eden Girls' College Building, Fazlul Huq College at Chakhar, Fazlul Huq Muslim Hall (University of Dhaka), Fazlul Huq Hall (Bangladesh Agricultural University, then East Pakistan Agricultural University), Sher-e-Bangla Hall (Bangladesh University of Engineering and Technology) Sher-e-Bangla Agricultural University (SAU) Dhaka-1207, Bulbul Music Academy and Central Women's College. Fazlul Huq significantly contributed to founding the leading university of Bangladesh: Dhaka University. During his premiership Bangla Academy was founded and Bengali New Year's Day (Pohela Boishakh) was declared a public holiday.

In Bangladesh, Huq is revered as one of the most important Bengali statesmen of the 20th century and for his role as a leading voice of Bengali Muslims in British India. Throughout Bangladesh, educational institutions (e.g., Barisal Sher-e-Bangla Medical College), roads, neighbourhoods (Sher-e-Bangla Nagor), and stadiums (Sher-e-Bangla Mirpur Stadium) have been named for him.

In Pakistan, he is remembered as one of the country's founding statesmen. A.K. Fazal-ul-Huq Road, one of the main roads in Islamabad, Pakistan, is named in his honour.

== See also ==
- Legislatures of British India
