= Banaripara Upazila =

Banaripara বানারীপাড়া
- Upazila
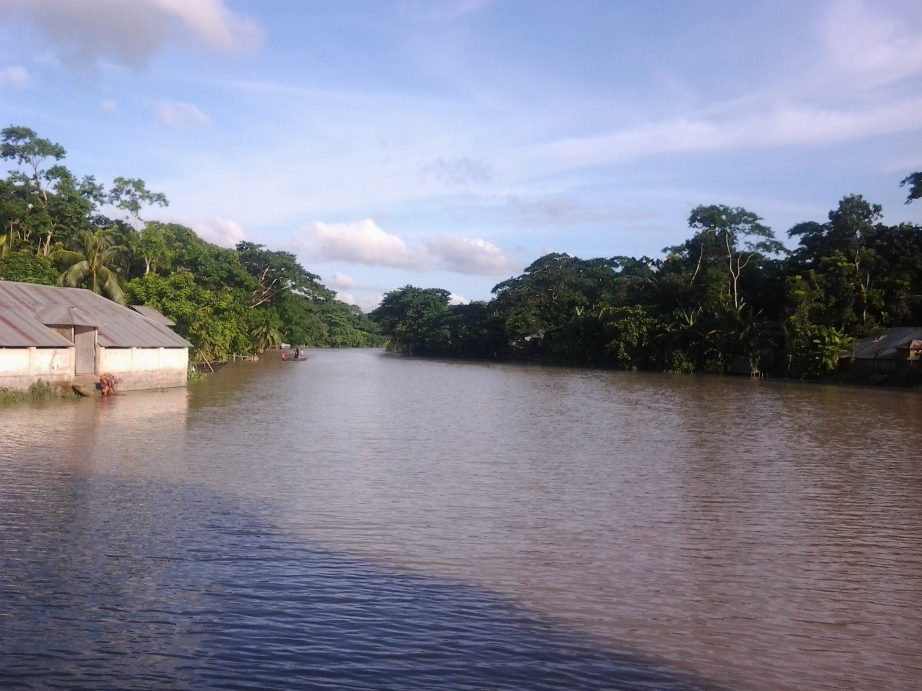
- View of river in Karpara

- Coordinates: 22°46.9′N 90°10′E
- Country: Bangladesh
- Division: Barisal
- District: Barisal
- Headquarters: Banaripara

Area
  - Total: 134.32 km^{2} (51.86 sq mi)

Population (2022)
  - Total: 169,876
  - Density: 1,264.7/km^{2} (3,275.6/sq mi)
- Time zone: UTC+6 (BST)
- Postal code: 8530
- Area code: 04332 04320
- Website: banaripara.barisal.gov.bd

Banaripara (Bengali: বানারীপাড়া) is an upazila of Barishal District in Barisal in southern-central Bangladesh.

== History ==
During the Independence War in 1971, the Pakistan Army killed 212 in Gava Village, where all Ghosh Dastidar and Ghosh Ray used to live and they mostly left their ancestral land for India. The villagers were rounded by local collaborators of the Pakistan Army, Akkas Ali Khan and Sarat Samaddar, in front of a canal and told their photos would be taken. Instead the Pakistan Army shot and killed the 200 people gathered there. Benu Bahini fought against Pakistan Army in the upazila.

== Geography ==
Banaripara is located at 22.7819°N 90.1667°E. It has a total area of 134.32 km^{2}. It is surrounded by Wazirpur to the north and the east, Nesarabad to the south, Jhalokati to the east, Nazirpur to the west. The upazila is criss-crossed by many rivers. Banaripara pourashava stands on the Shandhya. River erosion is a matter of concern for this area.

== Demographics ==
Religions in Banaripara Upazila (2022)
Religion	Percent
Islam	85.87%
Hinduism	13.88%
Other or not stated	0.25%

According to the 2022 Bangladeshi census, Banaripara Upazila had 41,196 households and a population of 169,876. 9.07% of the population were under 5 years of age. Banaripara had a literacy rate (age 7 and over) of 83.84%: 84.78% for males and 82.96% for females, and a sex ratio of 95.84 males for every 100 females. 18,628 (10.97%) lived in urban areas.

According to the 2011 Census of Bangladesh, Banaripara Upazila had 34,186 households and a population of 148,188. 31,694 (21.39%) were under 10 years of age. Banaripara had a literacy rate (age 7 and over) of 67.25%, compared to the national average of 51.8%, and a sex ratio of 1028 females per 1000 males. 16,882 (11.39%) lived in urban areas.

According to the 1991 Bangladeshi census, Banaripara had a population of 143,825. Males constituted 50.67% of the population, and females 49.33%. The population aged 18 or over was 70,724.

== Administration ==
UNO: Antara Haldar.

Banaripara was established as a thana in 1913 and in 1983, it was upgraded to upazila (sub-district) status due to Hussain Muhammad Ershad's decentralization programme.

Banaripara Upazila is divided into Banaripara Municipality and eight union parishads: Baisari, Banaripara, Bisarkandi, Chakhar, Iluhar, Saliabakpur, Saidkati, and Udaykati. The union parishads are subdivided into 76 mauzas and 76 villages.

== Archaeological heritage and relics ==
There are two Swathidaha Maths, a copper Manasa Bigraga weighing 3.5 maunds and a six-foot-high Bigraha at Narattampur (200 years old) which used to be family lineage of the Ghosh Ray family of Narratampur.

== Education ==
There are three colleges in the upazila. Government Fazlul Huq College, founded in 1940, is the only public one.

There are 27 high schools, 80 government primary schools, 41 non-government primary schools, 59 madrassas, 1 school for the deaf and dumb and 1 commercial school in this upazila.

According to Banglapedia, Baisari High School, founded in 1880, Govt. Banaripara Model Union Institution (Pilot), (1889), and Nalasree Government Primary School (1910) are notable schools.

== Notable people ==
- Syed Azizul Huq, former education minister of Bangladesh
