= Springvale =

Springvale or Spring Vale or variant, may refer to:

== Places ==
- Springvale Township (disambiguation)
- Springvale Airport (disambiguation)

=== Australia ===
- Springvale, New South Wales, a suburb of Wagga Wagga
- Springvale, Queensland, a locality in the Western Downs Region
- Springvale, Victoria, a suburb of Melbourne
  - Springvale railway station
- Springvale Station, a pastoral lease in the Kimberley region of Western Australia
- Springvale, Western Australia, the location of Springvale Airport
- Electoral district of Springvale, Victoria

=== Canada ===
- Springvale, Haldimand County, Ontario
- Springvale, Lambton County, Ontario
- West Royalty-Springvale, PEI; an electoral district
- Springvale Aerodrome, Ontario; an airport

=== New Zealand ===
- Springvale, New Zealand, suburb of Whanganui

=== United Kingdom ===
==== Northern Ireland ====
- Springvale, County Down, a townland in County Down, Northern Ireland

==== Scotland ====
- Springvale Park, Glasgow

==== England ====
- Spring Vale, Isle of Wight, a small village on the Isle of Wight
- Spring Vale, South Yorkshire, a location
- Spring Vale, Wolverhampton, West Midlands
- Spring Vale railway station, a former rail station serving the community of Spring Vale in Darwen, Lancashire

=== United States ===
- Springvale, Georgia
- Springvale, Maine
- Spring Vale, Michigan
- Spring Vale, MI
- Springvale, Columbia County, Wisconsin
- Springvale, Fond du Lac County, Wisconsin

== Other uses ==
- Springvale Secondary College, Victoria, Australia
- Springvale House, a private preparatory school in Mashonaland East, Zimbabwe

== See also ==
- Springvale Formation, Trinidad and Tobago
- Springvale Junction, a road junction in Melbourne, Victoria
- Springvale Bypass, a bypass in Melbourne, Victoria
- Springvale South, Victoria, Australia
- South Springvale SC, a soccer team from Springvale, Melbourne, Victoria, Australia
- Springvale Botanical Cemetery, Victoria, Australia
- Spring Vale Cemetery railway line, Victoria, Australia
  - Spring Vale Cemetery railway station
