= Stampede (disambiguation) =

A stampede is uncontrolled concerted running by a large herd of animals, including humans.

This term is sometimes applied to people; see crowd collapses and crushes and list of fatal crowd crushes.

Stampede may also refer to:

== Arts and entertainment ==
=== Fictional entities ===
- KAM Stampede, a fictional race team in Future GPX Cyber Formula
- Stampede J-1001, a fictional race car in Future GPX Cyber Formula
- Vash the Stampede, the protagonist of the Trigun manga and anime series

=== Music ===
- Stampede (band), a British hard rock band formed 1981
- Liz Cooper & The Stampede, an American psychedelic folk-rock band fl. 2014–2019
- Stampede (Concussion Ensemble album), 1993
- Stampede (Critters Buggin album), 2004
- Stampede (The Doobie Brothers album), 1975
- Stampede! (Hed PE album), 2019
- Stampede (Krokus album), 1990, and its title song
- Stampede (Hellyeah album), 2010, and its title song
- Stampede (Chris LeDoux album), 1996, and its title song
- Stampede (Orville Peck album), 2024
- "Stampede" (song), a 2026 single by Genesis Owusu from Redstar Wu & the Worldwide Scourge
- "Stampede", a 2013 song by Dimitri Vegas & Like Mike, Dvbbs and Borgeous

=== Film and television ===
- Stampede (1936 film), an American western film
- Stampede (1949 film), a Western directed by Lesley Selander
- One Piece: Stampede, a 2019 film based on the One Piece manga and anime series
- Stampede (TV series), a 1994 Australian country music television show
- Trigun Stampede, a Japanese anime television series first aired in 2023
- Stampede Entertainment, an American film production company founded in the early 1990s
- Stampede Ventures, an American film and television production studio founded in 2017

=== Sports, performances, etc. ===
- A set of related places and organizations in Calgary, Alberta, Canada:
  - Calgary Stampede, a yearly fair and exhibition
  - Stampede Wrestling
  - The Stampede Bulldogs
  - Stampede Corral
  - Stampede Park
- Dolly Parton's Stampede, formerly Dixie Stampede, a chain of dinner attractions
- Greeley Stampede, an annual celebration in Colorado, US
- Medicine Hat Exhibition & Stampede, an annual event held in Medicine Hat, Alberta, Canada
- Nerf Stampede ECS, a 2010 toy blaster gun released under the N-Strike series

==== Sports teams ====
- Austin Stampede, re-branded to Austin Aztex U23, 2007–2009, United Soccer League (USL) Premier Development League
- Buffalo Stampede, 2009–2011, basketball
- Buffalo Stampede (RHI), 1994–1995, Roller Hockey International
- Buffalo Stampede (Tier III), since 2021 in the United States Premier Hockey League
- Central Texas Stampede, 1996–2001, Western Professional Hockey League (minor professional ice hockey)
- Cheyenne Stampede, name since 2012, junior ice hockey (United Hockey Union / Western States Hockey League)
- Colorado Stampede, founded 2026, United Football League
- Denver Stampede, 2016–2017, PRO Rugby
- Harrisburg Stampede, 2008–2024, indoor football
- Idaho Stampede, 1997–2016 name, NBA Development League
- Nashville Stampede, since 2022, Professional Bull Riders
- Ocala Stampede, 2011–2015, soccer
- Oswego Stampede, 2017–2019 name, North American 3 Hockey League (Tier III junior ice hockey)
- Salem Stampede, 2005–2011 name, basketball
- San Angelo Stampede, 2003–2005 name, indoor football
- San Bernardino Stampede, 1996–2002 name, Minor League Baseball
- Sioux Falls Stampede, founded 1999, junior ice hockey
- Southern Stampede, 2005–2016 name, New Zealand Ice Hockey League
- Skycity Stampede, name since 2016, New Zealand Ice Hockey League
- Steubenville Stampede, 2005–2007, Continental Indoor Football League
- St. Louis Stampede, 1995–1996, arena football
- Syracuse Stampede, 2011–2017 name, North American 3 Hockey League (Tier III junior ice hockey)

=== Other media ===
- Stampede (radio play), 1934, Australian
- Stampede (video game), a 1981 video game
- Stampede, a working title for the game MotorStorm

== Other uses ==
- STAMPEDE (clinical trial)
- Stampede (supercomputer), at the Texas Advanced Computing Center
- Cache stampede, a type of cascading failure involving caches
- Beretta Stampede, a single-action revolver
- Stampede, Texas, US, an unincorporated community in Bell County
- Stampede Airport and Stampede Trail, Denali National Park, Alaska, US
- Stampede Dam, Sierra County, California, US
- Stampede Pass, Stampede Tunnel, etc., in Cascade Range, Washington, US

== See also ==
- Stampeders (disambiguation)
- American movies/films:
  - The Big Stampede, a 1932 pre-Code Western
  - The Calgary Stampede, a 1925 silent Western
  - Cattle Stampede, a 1943 Billy the Kid Western
  - Elephant Stampede, a 1951 adventure
  - Fort Dodge Stampede, a 1951 Western
  - Jungle Stampede, a 1950 adventure
  - Stampede in the Night, a 1916 short Western
  - Northwest Stampede, a 1948 Northwestern
  - El Paso Stampede, a 1953 Western
  - Santa Fe Stampede, a 1938 "Three Mesquiteers" Western
  - Texas Stampede, a 1939 Western
  - Timber Stampede, a 1939 Western
  - Wild Horse Stampede, a 1943 Western
  - The Wild Horse Stampede, a 1926 silent Western
- Other creative works:
  - Stampede of the Disco Elephants, a draft of Still Sucks, 2021 album by Limp Bizkit
  - Stampede Run, a 2013 Zynga with Friends video game
  - Sabreman Stampede, a canceled videogame
  - Swingin' Stampede, 1998 album by The Hot Club of Cowtown
- Rodeos:
  - Clements Stampede, California, US
  - Raymond Stampede, Alberta, Canada
  - Snake River Stampede, Idaho, US
- Other events:
  - In Your House 16: Canadian Stampede, a 1997 pay-per-view event by the World Wrestling Federation
  - Country Stampede Music Festival, Kansas
  - Kobuk River Stampede, a late-1890s gold rush in Alaska
  - Spring Stampede, a pay-per-view event by World Championship Wrestling
  - Sunset Stampede, an annual set of races in Asheville, North Carolina
- Professional wrestling match types §§ Bunkhouse Stampede and Stadium Stampede / Anarchy in the Arena match
- Dinosaur Stampede National Monument at Lark Quarry Conservation Park, Queensland, Australia
- Stamp Stampede, a political movement started in 2012
- Stampede string, a piece of Western wear attached to a cowboy hat
