= Louis Lavater =

Australian composer and author

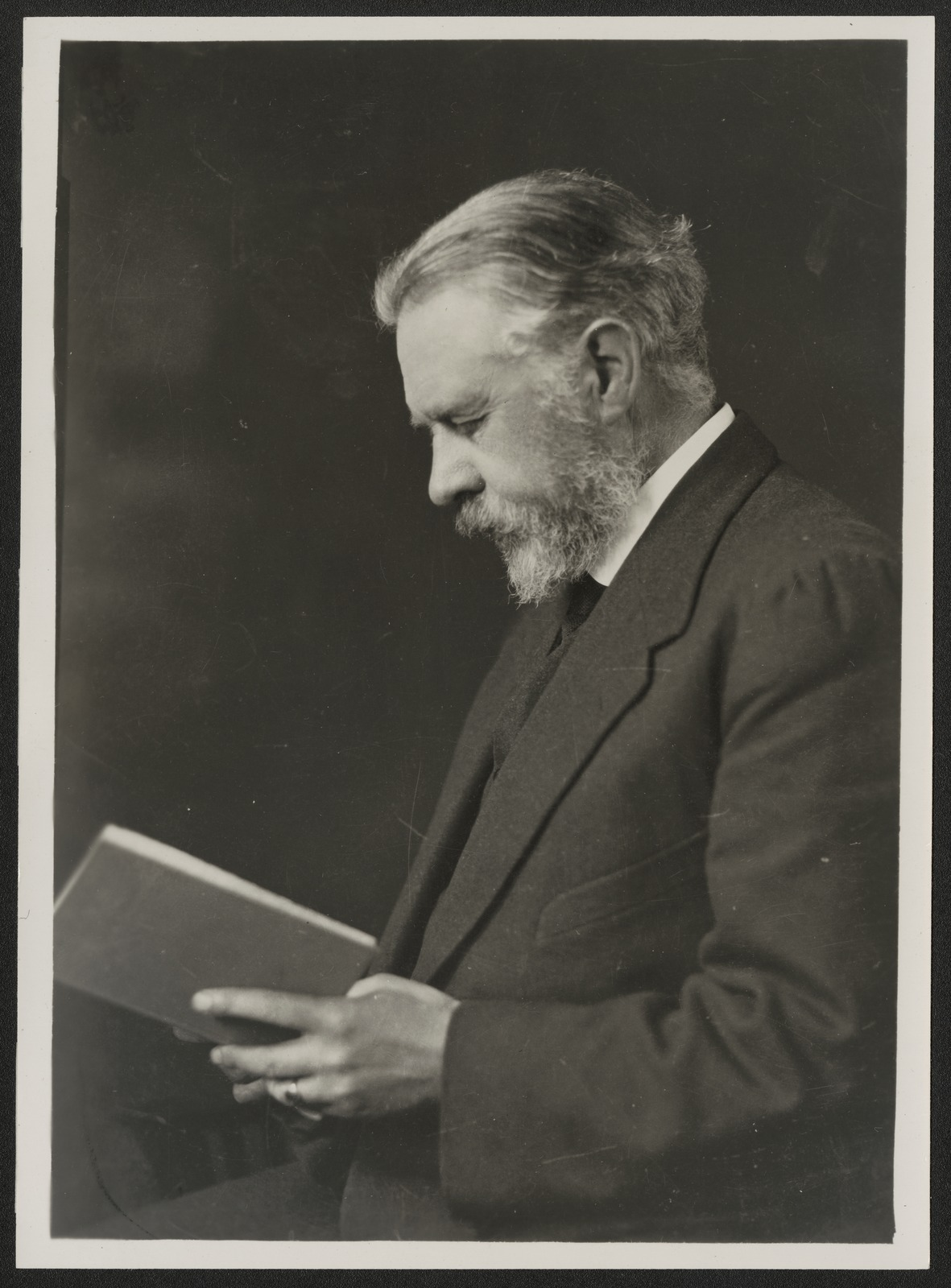
Louis Lavater in c.1917

Louis Isidore Lavater (2 March 1867 – 22 May 1953) was an Australian composer and author born in Victoria, of Swiss-Swedish extraction.

He published more than a hundred musical works, beginning in 1880 with the waltz Queen Mab which The Age reviewed in 1885 as that of "a musical talent of a respectable order," though noting that it was the earlier "work of a beginner."

He prepared musical settings of popular folklore by collaborating with well known Australian lyricists of his time, including Banjo Paterson, Henry Lawson and Mary Gilmore. He was a leading proponent of the Australian bush ballad as a vehicle for music education.

In 1938, Alfred Hill composed a musical setting of Lavater's verse Mopoke.

Lavater's words were also set by Australian composers Doctor Ruby Davy and Fanny Turbayne.

== Early life ==
Born in St Kilda, Melbourne, Lavater was the eldest child of Emily Challinor (née Swindells) and Swiss-born George Theodore Adams Lavater, a civil servant who had migrated to Victoria after the 1851 gold rush. He attended Grammar School in St Kilda and Wesley College. At the University of Melbourne from 1884 he began to study medicine. He later changed his enrolment to study music though did not finish the degree. While at the University Lavater joined the bohemian Buonarotti Club (1883–87), was active in its musical section and accompanied the artists on their painting camps. Much later he recalled lively experiences with the Club in a 1929 Argus interview.

== Notability ==
By Starlight (1936)
MIDI version

Dawn Song
MIDI version

Valse Lente
MIDI version

Lavater was regarded as a gifted leader of music in rural Victoria. He was fondly known for his direction of Liedertafel concerts held between 1890 and 1920.

Lavater established the Guild of Australian Composers in 1935.

In 1927 Gertrude Hart and Bernard Cronin founded the Society of Australian Authors. Cronin was president and Lavater and Hart were vice-presidents. Its aim was to raise the profile of Australian authors across Australia and also to welcome visiting writers. Cronin thought that the society became too political and it ceased to operate in 1936.

An oil portrait of Louis Lavater by Rollo Thomson hangs in the State Library of Victoria. Lavater composed ballet orchestrations which played abroad and arranged light opera.

His piano miniatures have been recorded by Larry Sitsky The White Owl was revived in a 1961 recording by Jessica Dix and Arnold Matters.

== Performances ==
Lavater's setting of The Old Bark Hut by Banjo Paterson was revived for a production of bush ballad musical Under the Coolibah Tree produced by the Waterside Worker's Union in 1956.

== Musical works ==
- 1880 Queen Mab Waltz
- 1891 Nina (ballet suite)
- 1895 Australis (Australian Hymn words added by Gallipoli correspondent John Sandes)
- 1921 Demon Wind (appeared in a 1921 musical play Laughing Murra by Euphemia Coulson Davidson Nee Kidd)
- 1922 Dance of the Saplings
- 1923 Hornpipe in G
- 1924 Valse capricieuse
- 1924 Awakening – Sonata in A major
- 1928 Canon in E flat
- 1932 Valse Lente
- c1933 The White Owl (words by Alfred Lord Tennyson)
- 1933 Meadow Clover (two part song based on his 1928 Canon)
- c1935 A pasing fancy (A humoreske for pianoforte)
- 1936 Aubade
- 1936 By starlight – serenade for string and piano
- 1936 A summer night – SATB voices
- 1937 We Beseech Thee Almighty God
- 1937 Twelve Preludes for Piano
- 1937 Trav'lin' down the Castlereagh (words by Banjo Paterson)
- 1937 The Old Bark Hut (words by Banjo Paterson)
- [unknown date] If I should make a garden – for soprano and piano (words by Mary Gilmore)
- [unknown date] Valse elegante – solo piano

== Publications ==
=== Poetry ===
- 1915 Blue Days and Grey Days
- 1917 A Lover's Ephemeris
- 1922 This Green Mortality
- Changing harmonies (unpublished)
- 1926 The Sonnet in Australasia (anthology) – editor
- Swedish poems – translator

=== Music ===
- 1928, 1945 The Licentiate Pianist's Handbook
- Music criticism

=== Other ===
- Short stories
- Book reviews
