= Springvale Airport =

Springvale Airport may refer to:

- Springvale Airport (Queensland), near Springvale, Queensland, Australia
- Springvale Airport (Western Australia), near Springvale, Western Australia, Australia
- Springvale Aerodrome, Ontario, Canada

== See also ==
- Springvale (disambiguation)
