= Ethel Tracy Richardson =

(1877–1942) nursing sister and army matron-in-chief

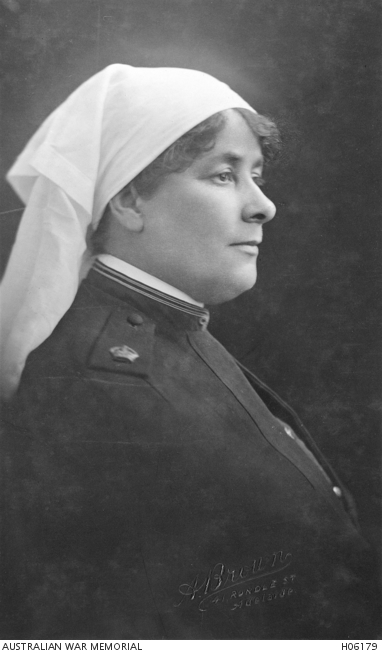
- Ethel Richardson during the First World War
- Born: 8 August 1877; Melbourne, Victoria
- Died: 8 November 1942 (aged 65); East Malvern, Victoria
- Burial place: Springvale Cemetery
- Spouse: Walter Edward Attiwill (m. 1921; died 1927)
- Military career
- Allegiance: Australia
- Branch: Australian Army
- Service years: 1914–1929
- Rank: Matron-in-Chief
- Conflicts: First World War
- Awards: Royal Red Cross

Ethel Tracy Richardson, RRC (8 August 1877 – 8 November 1942) was an Australian nursing sister, army matron-in-chief, and honorary major who served during the First World War. She was the first person to become Matron-in-chief on the staff of the director general of medical services at Army Headquarters, Melbourne.

== Early life ==
Richardson was born in Melbourne on 8 August 1877. She was descended from a Huguenot family associated with the Court of Louis XIV. Her family was also descended from the De Tracy family, who were attached to the Court of Elizabeth I. She was the eldest of five surviving children of Henry Francis Foster Richardson, an English account and civil servant, and her Tasmanian mother Louisa Brewen. She was the niece of Captain G. A. Richardson of the Royal Australian Navy.

== Career ==
Richardson began training as a nurse at the Austin and (Royal) Women's hospitals in Melbourne. She was then a nurse at the Sunbry Hospital for the Insane for nine years.

On 3 November 1914, Richardson enlisted in the Australian Army Nursing Service, Australian Imperial Force. She served in Egypt in the 1st Australian General Hospital. In 1915, she became the matron in charge of the Kyarra, which was the first hospital ship to return to Australia with wounded soldiers.

In August 1915, Richardson was appointed as the matron-in-charge of Reinforcements to Army Sisters for England and served in Harefield Hospital, then known as the No. 1 Australian Auxiliary Hospital. Richardson was recalled to Australia in 1916, where she was made matron-in-chief on the staff of the director general of medical services at Army Headquarters, Melbourne – the first person to hold this position. She held this position until 10 March 1920, during which time she supervised the administration of the Australian Army Nursing Service, hospital ships, sea transport, and nearly 3,000 nurses who had enlisted for service. She also organised the demobilisation of the A.A.N.S.

Richardson was matron in charge of Park Mental Hospital at Macleod, Victoria, until her resignation in September 1921.

Richardson was awarded the Royal Red Cross in 1917 for her services. She was the first matron in the Australian Army Nursing Service to become a major.

== Personal life and death ==
Richardson married Walter Edward Attiwill, a station manager from Hexham, Victoria, on 14 December 1921. She also became stepmother to two girls. They lived together in Hexham until Walter's death in 1927, after which Ethel lived in Caulfield, Victoria. Richardson's hobbies included oil painting and she was a member of the Army Nurse's Club.

In 1937, Richardson suffered from a stroke and entered Waiora Private Hospital in East Malvern. She died there on 8 November 1942. She is buried in Springvale Cemetery.
