= Luciano Rossetti Mausoleum =

Mausoleum in Springvale, Victoria, Australia

- Interactive map of Luciano Rossetti Mausoleum

Details
- Established: 2003
- Location: Springvale, Victoria
- Country: Australia
- Coordinates: 37°56′53″S 145°10′50″E
- No. of graves: 1398

The Luciano Rossetti Mausoleum is a mausoleum in the Australian state of Victoria located at the Springvale Botanical Cemetery in the Melbourne suburb of Springvale. It was designed by architect Philip Harmer and constructed by Gavin Constructions in 2003. It provides 1398 burial spaces for the Italian community.

== Plan ==
The mausoleum consists of five angled galleries that are positioned around an open courtyard and two reflection pools. The five galleries are St. Anthony, Our Lady, Holy Trinity, Sacred Heart and the Archangel Gabriel. Each gallery is separated by different types of stone and ceiling finishes adorned with handcrafted religious mosaics to offer choice for buyers. The blue stone pavement of the gallery, ceramic mosaics and the distinct palette of material finishes elude a welcoming and comfortable presence to visitors. Precast concrete panels engineered by Gutterridge Haskins & Davey, were specially shaped into “wings” to form the external colonnades of the mausoleum to provide maximum lighting and exposure to prevailing winds. The series of semi-enclosed galleries due to cut-out profiles also provides views to the interstitial gardens and water features for all galleries. Subsequently, a play of light and shadow is formed across the interior spaces from the cut-outs, inviting contemplation to visitors. The mausoleum houses a total of 1398 casket spaces that are distributed throughout three different types of rooms – single, pair and family rooms. Crypts adorned with Italian marble are positioned next to the sea of coloured glass windows to allow the caskets to bathe under coloured lights throughout different times of the day. Families that desire to be buried together are able to go for an individual room with a burial space of up to 10 family members in one particular section. Furthermore, statues, mementoes and special keepsakes are displayed in the lockable, glass fronted personal memory showcases.

== Key influences and design approach ==
The brief given to Harmer Architects was to create a new 1400-crypt mausoleum at the Springvale Botanical Cemetery in Melbourne, Australia. The mausoleum would be the second major community mausoleum to be located within the cemetery. Rather than following the tradition of an Australian style of cemetery architecture, architect Philip Harmer decided to break convention by incorporating a more contemporary approach to cemetery architecture. He started investigating contemporary mausoleum designs and it bore undesirable results, with the exception of a particular one in Spain by Enrique Miralles. The critical aspect to this project, according to Harmer, was the orientation of the spaces. By re-defining what a mausoleum should be, Harmer stressed that the mausoleum should not be totally enclosed, but otherwise, it should be partially opened to the landscape elements and water features. In conjunction with the semi-enclosed idea, Harmer also intended to distinguish the five galleries from one another. By opting for a more durable and monumental material – standard precast concrete, Harmer successfully portrayed a dramatic monumentality of the building form and defined the spaces within the structure effectively. The advantages of precast concrete panels also allow Harmer to experiment with different shapes, colours and finishes to produce an individual statement for each gallery in the mausoleum. Harmer said although the mausoleum is intended to break the tradition, it does possess a strong link to past. The juxtaposition between the definitive monumental character of the adjacent neoclassical edifice and the irregularly aligned intersecting linear spaces that has no beginning nor end successfully creates a more comforting environment in which to grieve.

=== Awards ===
The mausoleum won the Institutional Architecture 2006 RAIA Victorian Architecture Awards.

The mausoleum was judged the national winner of the 2007 Cement Concrete and Aggregates Australia Public Domain Awards based on its breakthrough in Australian cemetery architecture.
