= Stampeders =

Stampeders may refer to:

- Calgary Stampeders, a Canadian football team
- The Stampeders, a Canadian rock trio

== See also ==
- Stampede (disambiguation)
