= Elana James =

American jazz musician

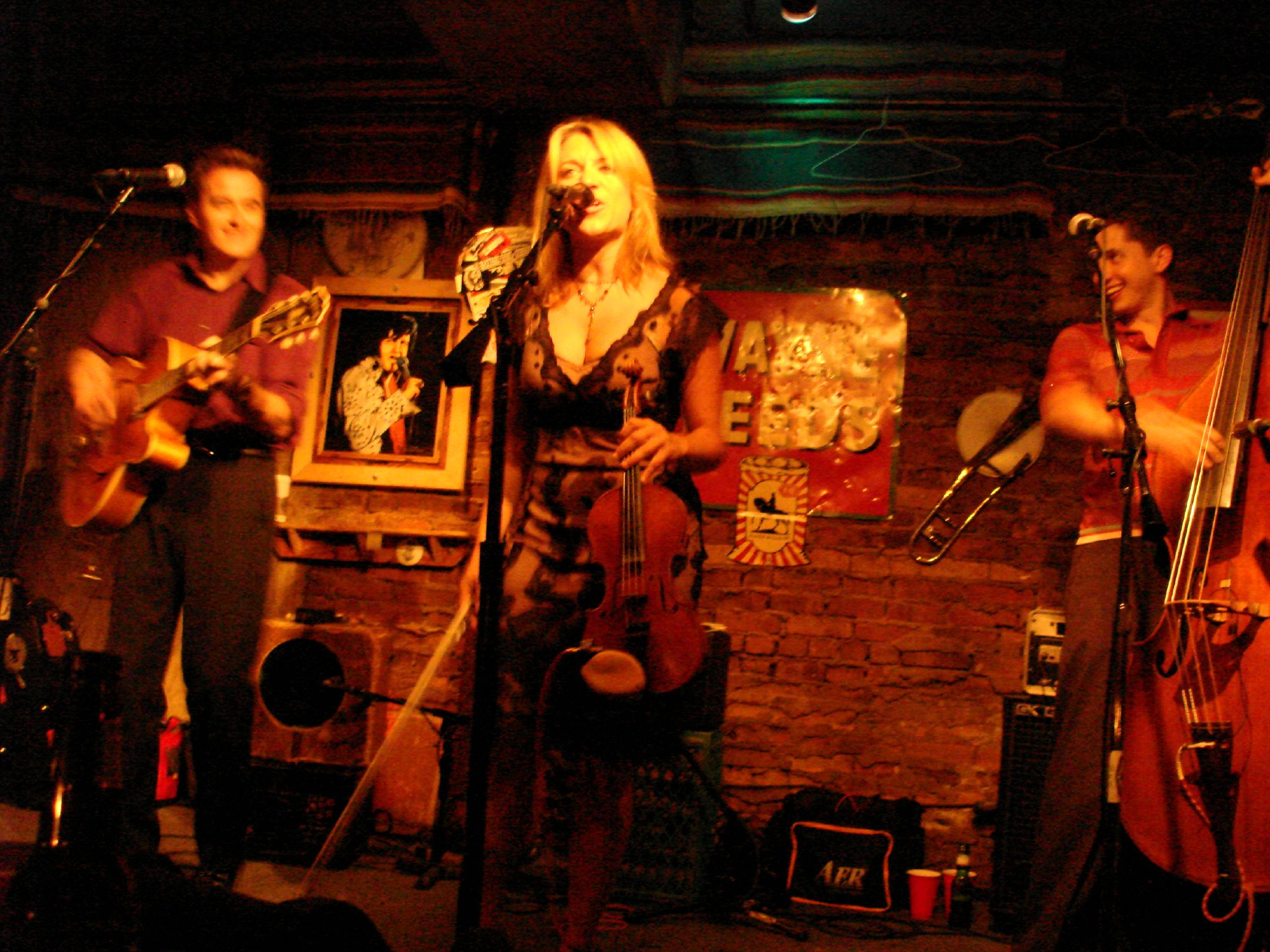
Elana James (center) and the Continental Two performing in 2007.

Elana James (born Elana Jaime Fremerman, October 21, 1970, Kansas City, Missouri, United States) is an American songwriter, Western swing, folk and jazz violinist, vocalist, and a founding member of the band Hot Club of Cowtown.

== Biography ==
James grew up in Prairie Village, Kansas, a suburb of Kansas City, Missouri, and began studying Suzuki violin at age four. Her mother, Susan, is a professional violinist who used to play in the Kansas City Symphony and her father, Marvin, ran a commercial recording studio and was the creative director and founder of an advertising agency in Kansas City.

James grew up riding her horse, April, and playing violin in Kansas before leaving for New York City at age 17. In 1992 she graduated cum laude with a B.A. in Comparative Religion from Barnard College, Columbia University, in New York City (with a focus on Buddhism and Hinduism) while studying violin and viola at the Manhattan School of Music as a student of Lucie Robert and Karen Ritscher. She studied improvisation and swing fiddle with Marty Laster in New York City and studied Dhrupad, an early form of North Indian Classical music, with Pandit Vidhur Malik in Vrindavan, India.

James is a former managing editor of Tricycle: The Buddhist Review and a former editorial intern at Harper's Magazine. In the early 1990s she worked as a horse wrangler at the Home Ranch in Clark, Colorado where she also played fiddle in the ranch's cowboy band. James also worked occasionally as a packer and horse wrangler in the West Elk and La Garita Wilderness in Colorado in the mid-1990s, punctuated by brief stints in publishing in New York City. James is an alumnus of the Meadowmount School of Music, the New York Youth Symphony, the Columbia University Chamber Music Program, the New York String Orchestra Seminar with Alexander Schneider and the American Conservatory in Fontainebleau, France.

== Musical career ==
Elana James met guitarist Whit Smith in 1994 through an ad in the Village Voice while both were living in New York City. They played together for some years, later adding Jake Erwin, a slap bass player, and forming the American swing trio Hot Club of Cowtown. The group plays original material as well as a mix of pre-WWII Western swing, a style made famous by Bob Wills and Milton Brown, combined with the Gypsy jazz of guitarist Django Reinhardt and violinist Stephane Grappelli. Other influences include American swing violinists Stuff Smith, Joe Venuti, and Johnny Gimble. Hot Club of Cowtown, which has been based in Austin, Texas since 1998, is not named for any specific "Cowtown," but is rather just intended as state of mind, or "The Cowtown of the Imagination."

James toured with Bob Dylan in 2004, 2005, and 2006 (James came to Dylan's attention when The Hot Club of Cowtown opened for him and Willie Nelson during a joint tour of historic baseball parks in the Summer of 2004). She briefly joined Dylan's band in 2005 on a tour with Merle Haggard, Bob Dylan, and Amos Lee, as the first dedicated female instrumentalist to play in Dylan's touring band since Scarlet Rivera in the early 1970s.

The Hot Club of Cowtown briefly separated in 2005. Around this time, Fremerman changed her name to Elana James and released her debut album, Elana James, forming a trio called Elana James and the Continental Two with Beau Sample on bass and Luke Hill on guitar. She joined Dylan again in 2006 as his opening act on another historic ballparks tour also featuring Junior Brown and Jimmie Vaughan.

James's second solo album, Black Beauty (Snarf, 2015), is a collection of eclectic folk and pop songs and original material. In The Wall Street Journal article including Black Beauty as one of the "Six Retro Roots Albums to Jump Start Your Summer." Barry Mazor wrote, "Ms. James is more a singing, swinging Grappelli- and Venuti-influenced violinist than a breakdown fiddler, which serves her well on this set. Her smooth, sweet string-vocal combination is applied—along with jazz piano here, steel guitar there—to material ranging from the Grateful Dead's 'Ripple' to Goebel Reeves's 'Hobo's Lullaby' and the Peggy Lee/Benny Goodman 'All I Need Is You.' Genre distinctions collapse. The rootsier songs all become entries in the jazzy Great American Songbook."

From 2005 through 2008, James led her trio and performed in one with Cindy Cashdollar and Redd Volkaert as the High Flyers, appearing on A Prairie Home Companion and in clubs in Austin. During this time James also performed with Heybale, a group including Redd Volkaert, Earl Poole Ball, Tom Lewis, Kevin Smith and Gary Claxton.

In 2008, The Hot Club of Cowtown, with James, guitarist Whit Smith and bassist Jake Erwin re-formed, and continued touring and recording. In 2008, the band released The Best of the Hot Club of Cowtown, followed by Wishful Thinking in 2009, and in 2011, a collection of Western swing songs made popular by legendary Texas bandleader Bob Wills, What Makes Bob Holler. The Hot Club of Cowtown's most recent albums include Rendezvous in Rhythm (Gold Strike Records, 2013), a collection of hot jazz standards and traditional Romanian-style instrumentals performed acoustically, in the style of Django Reinhardt and Stephane Grappelli; Midnight on the Trail, a compilation of early Western swing and cowboy songs; "Crossing the Great Divide," a 7-track EP of songs written by The Band on the occasion of the 50th anniversary of the release of Music from Big Pink and The Band; and Wild Kingdom, an album of original material released on September 27, 2019. In 2022 the band released Live from Belfast, a live set recorded live at the Black Box in Belfast, Northern Ireland, followed by The Finest Hour, a collection of songs on the American pop chart in 1945. The band released Limelight in 2025, a collection of standards, Cowboy songs, an original waltz, Joe Venuti’s “Hoedown Lowdown,” and works by Jimmie Rodgers, Django Reinhardt and others.

When not performing, writing music, and touring, James continues to work in Montana's wilderness and back country as a sometimes wrangler, packer, cook, and guide for outfitters in the Bob Marshall Wilderness and Lee Metcalf Wilderness, as well as in and around Yellowstone National Park. In 2019 as one of two Packer Apprentices with the Bob Marshall Wilderness Foundation for the summer season, James packed with and learned from established packers in northwest Montana, partnering with and re-supplying trail maintenance crews, US Forest Service special projects, and fire lookouts.

In 2025 she was awarded the Bob Marshall Wilderness Foundation and Glacier Art Museum’s Artist Wilderness Connection (AWC) residency in Montana’s Great Bear Wilderness. The project is ongoing throughout 2026 with a public presentations in Montana slated for late 2026 including new songs inspired by a stay at the US Forest Service’s Granite Cabin in the Middle Fork of the Flathead.

James also teaches music privately and leads fiddle workshops, and has been on the faculty of Montana Fiddle Camp in Monarch, Montana, the violin faculty for Django in June for the summer of 2026 in Northampton, MA, and a guest instructor at one of Kansas City’s Drunken Fiddles annual festivals in 2026. James has also led workshops at the Big Muddy Folk Festival (Boonville, MO) 2026, the Scottish Partnership for Arts and Education with Dom Flemons (St. Louis, MO) 2026, at the International Folk Alliance (Kansas City, MO), the John G. Shedd Institute for the Arts (Eugene, OR), the Django Reinhardt Birthday Celebration at the Freight & Salvage (Berkeley, CA) and for Music Network at Bangor Castle (Bangor, Northern Ireland, UK), among others.

James's focus generally involves improvisation, songwriting on the violin, and taking a leap from Classical playing to improvisation (chords, style, scale patterns, approach). James occasionally posts free, short educational segments on basic improvisation and song structure to her youtube channel.

James has been a guest on A Prairie Home Companion, the Grand Ole Opry, the Women in Jazz series at Jazz at Lincoln Center, and at festivals and concerts throughout the world, including the Glastonbury Festival in England, the Fuji Rock Festival in Japan, Australia's East Coast Blues & Roots Music Festival, the Rochester Jazz Festival, Hardly Strictly Bluegrass Festival, the Kennedy Center Millennium Stage and the Cambridge Folk Festival.

James and her Hot Club of Cowtown bandmates have appeared on "Larry's Country Diner" on RFD-TV several times. As a solo artist James has been a guest on National Public Radio's "Song of the Day," Montana Public Radio's "Musician's Spotlight," hosted by John Floridis, on RFD-TV's "Ray's Roadhouse" with Asleep at the Wheel, with Bob Wills’ Texas Playboys under the Direction of Jason Roberts in Turkey and Mexia, Texas, at Art of the Cowgirl in Phoenix, Arizona, and on Andy Hedges's Cowboy Crossroads podcast.

James is also featured in the book Women in Texas Music: Stories and Songs by Kathleen Hudson (2007).

== Press & Media ==
Cowboy Crossroads, hosted by Andy Hedges

American Songster Radio Show, hosted by Dom Flemons

Live reviews, Elana on tour with Bob Dylan

Musician's Spotlight on Montana Public Radio, hosted by John Floridis

A Prairie Home Companion, October 18, 2008

A Prairie Home Companion, June 10, 2006

A Prairie Home Companion, June 11, 2011

NPR Song of the Day

All Things Considered (Hot Club of Cowtown, with John Ydstie

New York Times (Hot Club of Cowtown live review), by Jon Pareles

San Diego Troubador by Terry Paul Roland

== Awards & Honors ==
In 2013 Elana James was nominated in the Western Swing Female category for the first Ameripolitan Music Awards in Austin, Texas. In February 2015 James was named Western Swing Female 2015 at the Ameripolitan Music Awards. In 2015 the Hot Club of Cowtown also won for Best Western Swing Group at the second annual Ameripolitan Music Awards at the Paramount Theater in Austin, Texas. On October 6, 2019, James was inducted into the Sacramento Western Swing Society's Hall of Fame. In November 2025 James was inducted, with her Hot Club of Cowtown bandmates, into the International Western Music Association’s Hall of Fame in Albuquerque, NM.

In 2004 James was inducted, with her Hot Club of Cowtown bandmates, into the Texas Western Swing Hall of Fame. James has recorded with a wide array of folk, country, and Americana artists including Bob Dylan, Merle Haggard, Willie Nelson, Slaid Cleaves, Denny Freeman, Dave Stuckey, Eliza Gilkyson, Heybale!, Tom Russell, Ken Jones, The Hoyle Brothers, Kerry Polk, Beatroot Revival, Bruce Anfinson, and many others.

== Discography ==
=== Elana James solo ===
- Elana James (Snarf, 2007)
- Black Beauty (Snarf, 2015)
- Elana James's Hot Fiddle Improvisation (Educational DVD), 2011

=== Elana James with Hot Club of Cowtown ===
- Swingin' Stampede (HighTone, 1998)
- Tall Tales (HighTone, 1999)
- Dev'lish Mary (HighTone, 2000)
- Ghost Train (HighTone, 2002)
- Hot Jazz (Buffalo, Japan 2002)
- Hot Western (Buffalo, Japan, 2002)
- Continental Stomp (HighTone, 2003)
- In Search of a Midnight Kiss Soundtrack (2008)
- Best of the Hot Club of Cowtown (2008)
- Wishful Thinking (Gold Strike, 2009)
- Rare and Unreleased (Gold Strike, 2010) digital only
- What Makes Bob Holler (Proper, UK, 2011)
- Rendezvous in Rhythm (Gold Strike, 2013)
- Midnight on the Trail (Gold Strike, 2015)
- Western Clambake (Gold Strike, 2017)
- Crossing the Great Divide (Gold Strike, 2019)
- Wild Kingdom (The Last Music Company, UK, 2019)
- The Finest Hour (Gold Strike, 2022)
- Live from Belfast (Gold Strike, 2023)
- Limelight (Gold Strike, 2025) digital only
