= Gertrude Hart =

Australian writer and poet (1873–1965)

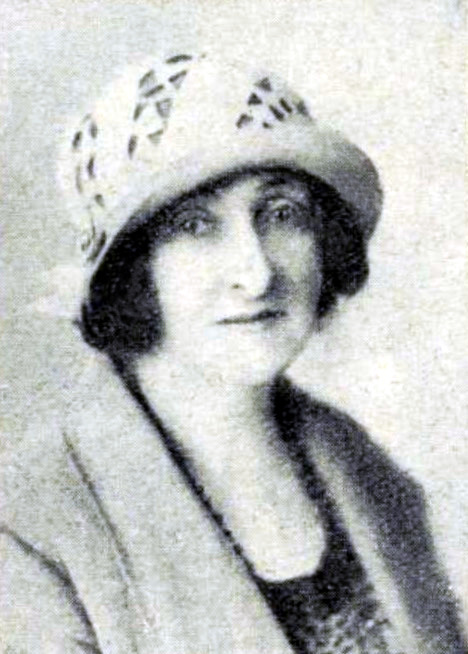
- Hart in 1930
- Born: 1873 Williamstown, Victoria, Australia
- Died: 28 January 1965 (aged 91–92) Olinda, Victoria, Australia
- Notable works: The Dream Girl; Chubby

Ethel Gertrude Hart (1873 – 28 January 1965) was an Australian children's novelist, short story writer and poet. With Bernard Cronin, she founded the Old Derelicts' Club in 1920 which later became the Society of Australian Authors.

== Biography ==
Ethel Gertrude Hart was born in 1873 in the Melbourne suburb of Williamstown, and grew up in Stawell in western Victoria. She was educated at Hohenloe College, a private girls' school in Warrnambool.

Her first book, Wanted – A Servant: An Australian Story, was published in England in 1890. Her poetry appeared in the Melbourne press from 1911 through to the 1950s when she wrote "Australia Speaks Its Love", celebrating the coronation of Queen Elizabeth II and the royal visit to Australia in 1954.

On the day she received the first copy of her 1912 romance novel, The Dream Girl, she walked for the first time in seven years, following successful surgery. Doubleday Doran & Co. bought the rights to publish it in the United States.

A reviewer of The Laughter Lady suggested that it may be better enjoyed by 50-year-olds than children and that it had "wide appeal". Chubby was published by The Australasian in serial form in 1928.

In 1920 she and Bernard Cronin founded the Old Derelicts' Club, a group for "struggling" writers and artists. In 1927 it became the Society of Australian Authors, with Cronin as president and Louis Lavater and Hart vice-presidents. Its aim was to raise the profile of Australian authors across Australia and also to welcome visiting writers. Cronin thought that the society became too political and it ceased to operate in 1936.

Hart was one of the first 14 women to join the Victorian branch of the PEN Club (now PEN International) in the 1930s, a condition of membership being publication of one or more books.

Hart spent her final years at Ferny Creek and died at Olinda on 28 January 1965.

== Selected works ==
- Hart, E. Gertrude (1898), Clouds that pass, S. W. Partridge
- Hart, E. Gertrude; Hart, Annie A. (1902), At the bend of the creek: A story of Australia, S. W. Partridge
- Hart, Gertrude (1912), The dream girl: A novel, George Robertson & Co.
- Hart, E. Gertrude (1914), The laughter lady: A story for children of different ages, Gartland, O. A., (illustrator), Melbourne Publishing Co.
- Hart, Gertrude (1937), Chubby, Hutchinson & Co.
- Hart, Gertrude (1937), Chubby and Pip, Hutchinson & Co.
