= Springvale Township =

Springvale Township may refer to the following places in the United States:

- Springvale Township, Emmet County, Michigan
- Springvale Township, Isanti County, Minnesota
- Springvale Township, Barnes County, North Dakota
- Springvale Township, Logan County, Oklahoma

== See also ==
- Springvale (disambiguation)
