= The Hot Club of Cowtown =

American musical group

Hot Club of Cowtown
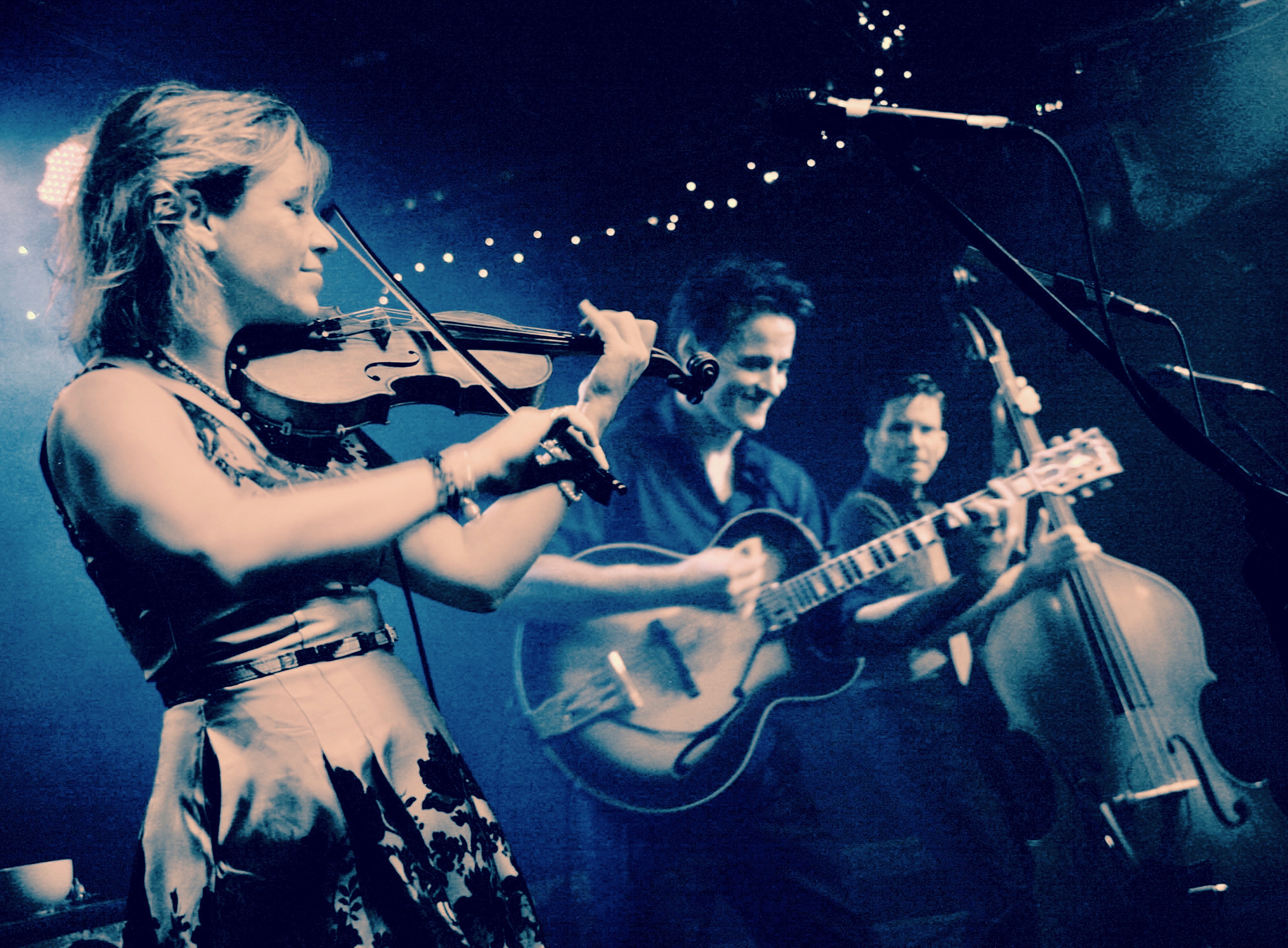
- Hot Club of Cowtown performing live at Dingwalls in London, UK. Photo by JJ Johnson

Background information
- Origin: United States
- Genres: Western swing; jazz; country; gypsy jazz; swing
- Years active: 1997–present
- Labels: HighTone, Proper, Concord, Rounder, Last Music Company, Gold Strike
- Members: Elana James; Whit Smith
- Past members: TC Cyran; Billy Horton; Jake Erwin
- Website: www.hotclubofcowtown.com

The Hot Club of Cowtown is an American Western swing trio that formed in 1997.

== History ==
The band's name comes from two sources: "Hot Club" from the hot jazz guitarist Django Reinhardt and violinist Stephane Grappelli's Quintette du Hot Club de France, and "Cowtown" from the western influence of Bob Wills and His Texas Playboys and other early Western swing combos, as well as the band's love of fiddle tunes, hoedowns, and songs of the American west.

Whit Smith (from Cape Cod, Massachusetts) and Elana James (from Prairie Village, Kansas) met through an ad in the classified music section of The Village Voice in 1994. They played together in New York City before moving to San Diego in 1997, where they spent a year playing for tips and building up their repertoire. In 1998 they moved to Austin, Texas and two years later added Jake Erwin (from Tulsa, Oklahoma) on bass.

The band split briefly in 2005, though they reunited for occasional shows in 2005–07, including the Fuji Rock Festival and a tour of Australia as Elana James & The Hot Club of Cowtown, in 2007. Whit Smith performed as Whit Smith's Hot Jazz Caravan, based in Austin, Texas. Elana toured with Bob Dylan in 2005 and began performing with her own trio later in 2005. Smith and James resumed playing together full-time in 2006 and by early 2008 the Hot Club of Cowtown had officially re-formed.

In the summer of 2020, upright bass player Jake Erwin retired from the band and was replaced by Zack Sapunor, who was with the band until mid-2023. Currently the Hot Club of Cowtown performs with guest artists including Beau Sample, Lindsay Greene, and Jake Erwin.

== Recordings ==
The Hot Club's first album, 1998's Swingin' Stampede, is a collection of standards, fiddle tunes, and classic Western swing songs, including two written by Bob Wills. Their 1999 follow-up album, Tall Tales, includes original songs by Smith and James, including "Darling You and I Are Through" by James, "Emily" and "When I Lost You" by Smith, and other Western swing standards by Bob Wills and Pee Wee King, among others. Later albums continued to mix classic Western swing and hot jazz, with originals in the same style, including the studio albums Ghost Train (2002) and Wishful Thinking (2009). Their 2011 album What Makes Bob Holler was a tribute to Bob Wills and includes obscure B-sides with some of Wills' most popular work, including "Big Balls in Cowtown", "Stay a Little Longer", "Osage Stomp" and "The Devil Ain't Lazy". What Makes Bob Holler has since been re-released by the Last Music Company worldwide in several formats, including vinyl. In 2012, the Hot Club of Cowtown released a live DVD, Continental Dance Party, which was filmed at the Continental Club Gallery in Austin, Texas.

In 2016, the Hot Club of Cowtown released its ninth studio album, Midnight on the Trail (Gold Strike Records), a vintage mix of 12 Western swing songs and cowboy ballads "hand-collected to reflect the spirit and joy of the American West", including traditional songs as well as works by Cindy Walker, Gene Autry, Bob Wills, Johnny Mercer, and more. The band's previous release, Rendezvous in Rhythm (Gold Strike Records, 2013), was a collection of hot jazz standards and gypsy instrumentals played acoustically in the style of Django Reinhardt and Stephane Grappelli (The Quintette of the Hot Club of France). "Often people at our shows, old-timers from West Texas, will come up and tell us that what they really like is those traditional, Romanian-sounding songs. This was the antidote to our Western swing CD. Our band is better known as a western swing act, and even though Western swing includes all kinds of jazzy bluesy idioms from back in the day, the western and country part of it are so prominent that it tends to overshadow the purely jazzy European side," said James.

In 2017, in recognition of the band's 20th anniversary, the Hot Club of Cowtown re-released their first set of recordings, Western Clambake, a cassette which had previously been released in 1997 when the band played for tips in and around San Diego, California, at farmers' markets, local cafes and coffee houses, and Balboa Park. Crossing the Great Divide, an EP of songs drawn from the first two albums by the Band (Music from Big Pink and The Band) and re-arranged Hot Club of Cowtown-style, followed soon thereafter.

The Hot Club of Cowtown's 11th studio album, Wild Kingdom, was released on September 27, 2019, a fourteen-track collection of standards and original songs by Whit Smith and Elana James about star-crossed romances ("Near Mrs."), cavemen, Mongolian stallions, vintage candy, rodeo pick-up men, and the real meaning of "Last Call." Wild Kingdom was pulled during the pandemic in 2020 and re-released worldwide in 2022 on the London, UK label The Last Music Company. The band also released The Finest Hour in early 2020, a collection of songs from the American pop chart at the end of World War II in 1945. The Finest Hour was recorded in front of a live audience at the Dakota Jazz Club in Minneapolis.

In 2023 the band released "Live from Belfast," recorded live at the Black Box in Belfast, Northern Ireland, in 2016, followed by Limelight, recorded in Chicago in 2024 and released in 2025. Limelight was engineered and mixed by Alex Hall at Reliable Recorders with Beau Sample on bass.

== Awards and live performances ==
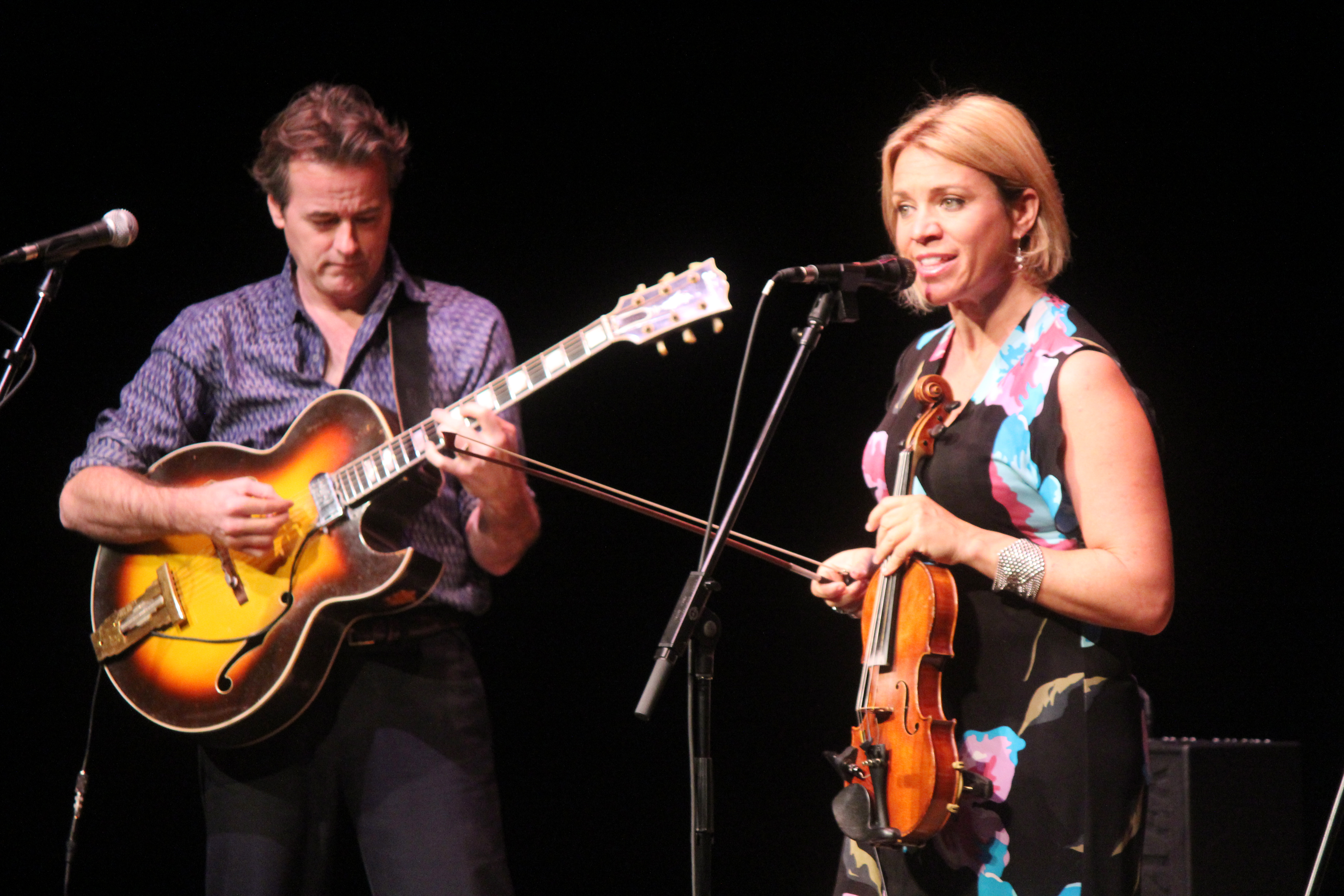
Whit Smith and Elana James performing with the band in Kodiak, Alaska in September 2013.

The Hot Club of Cowtown continues to tour year-round, primarily in the US and the UK.

Their live show has been described as "an arsenal full of technique and joy" by Jon Caramanica in the New York Times.

Frank De Blase, in the Rochester City Paper, writes that the band "swung light and tight like tumbleweeds made of velvet."

The Sunday Times described the Hot Club of Cowtown as “The world's most engaging Western Swing band – their shows are all about energy and joie de vivre – the devil-may-care style that combined the rigour of Jazz with the down-home sentiment of Country and earthiness of the Blues – it is as a live act that they have made their greatest impact.”

=== Awards ===
In November, 2025 the Hot Club of Cowtown (Elana James, Whit Smith and Jake Erwin) was inducted in to the International Western Music Association's (IWMA) Hall of Fame in Albuquerque, New Mexico.

Elana James was inducted into the Sacramento Western Swing Hall of Fame in Sacramento, California in October, 2019.

In 2014, the Hot Club of Cowtown was nominated for the first-ever Ameripolitan Music Awards, held in Austin, Texas in the Western Swing Group of the Year category. The band was nominated again for the Ameripolitan Music Awards the following year (2015) and won Western Swing Group of the Year that year, and Elana James won Western Swing Female of the Year.

The band was named "Best Music Group" by True West Magazine's Best of the West Awards in 2012 and was named in the Village Voice's Pazz & Jop poll the same year.

The Hot Club of Cowtown was inducted into the Texas Western Swing Hall of Fame in 2004.

The band won the IWMA's Crescendo Award in 2002, for "a group or individual, new to the national or international Western scene, having made considerable advances artistically and/or commercially during the eligibility period."

=== Career highlights ===
Career highlights include the Women in Jazz series (part of Jazz at Lincoln Center), the Cambridge Folk Festival (UK), the Glastonbury Festival (UK), the Fuji Rock Festival (Japan), Byron Bay Blues & Roots Festival (AU), the National Folk Festival (US and AU), the Stagecoach Festival, the Winnipeg Folk Festival (CA), Waiting for Waits Festival (SP), the grand opening of the Country Music Hall of Fame and Museum in Nashville, Tennessee, The Barns at Wolf Trap, the Rochester Jazz Festival, the Strawberry Festival, the Hardly Strictly Bluegrass Festival, the National Cowboy Poetry Gathering in Elko, Nevada, and traveling as US State Department Musical Ambassadors to Azerbaijan, Armenia, Algeria, the Republic of Georgia, and the Sultanate of Oman.

The Hot Club of Cowtown has toured with Bob Dylan, Willie Nelson, the Squirrel Nut Zippers, The Mavericks, Dan Hicks, Don Walser, Gatemouth Brown, Robert Earl Keen, Asleep at the Wheel, The Avett Brothers, Bryan Ferry, Tyler Hilton and others.

In January and February 2011, the Hot Club of Cowtown toured with Roxy Music as the opening act on Roxy's UK leg of their For Your Pleasure tour.

The band has been featured on television, appearing on several episodes of Larry's Country Diner, as well as on Later... with Jools Holland and the Jools Holland New Year's Eve Hootenanny (UK), $40 a Day with Rachael Ray (US), Samantha Brown's Places to Love (Texas Hill Country episode), the Grand Ole Opry (US), the BBC Live From Glastonbury broadcast (UK), Good Morning Azerbaijan, the Texas Music Cafe, and others.

Film credits for songs include indie films Four Dead Batteries and In Search of a Midnight Kiss and the BBC Four documentary Penelope Keith & the Fast Lady.

United States radio appearances include Mountain Stage, eTown, World Cafe, A Prairie Home Companion, All Things Considered, Morning Edition, WoodSongs Old-Time Radio Hour, Sirius Satellite, XM Satellite, and many more.

== Discography ==
- 1998: Swingin' Stampede HighTone
- 1999: Tall Tales HighTone
- 2000: Dev'lish Mary HighTone
- 2002: Hot Jazz (Japan only) Buffalo
- 2002: Hot Western (Japan only) Buffalo
- 2002: Ghost Train HighTone
- 2003: Continental Stomp [live] HighTone
- 2005: Four Dead Batteries (original soundtrack) HighTone
- 2008: The Best of The Hot Club of Cowtown Shout! Factory
- 2009: Wishful Thinking Gold Strike
- 2011: What Makes Bob Holler Proper American—Vinyl reissued Oct 2021 by The Last Music Company (London, UK)
- 2012: Continental Dance Party (DVD) Gold Strike
- 2013: Rendezvous in Rhythm Gold Strike
- 2016: Midnight on the Trail Gold Strike
- 2017: Western Clambake (reissue of the band's first recordings from 1997) Gold Strike
- 2019: Crossing The Great Divide (tribute to The Band) Gold Strike
- 2019: Wild Kingdom Gold Strike—Reissued worldwide April 2022 by The Last Music Company (London, UK)
- 2020: The Finest Hour—Songs That Ended WWII
- 2023: Live From Belfast—Live in Belfast, Northern Ireland, November 2016
- 2025: Limelight Gold Strike

== Individual media by band members ==
- 2008: Chordination – Instructional DVD by Whit Smith
- 2011: Chordination, Vol. 2 – Instructional DVD by Whit Smith
- 2012: Hell Among The Hedgehogs (Old Cow Records) – CD/EP (32:00) featuring the twin guitars of Whit Smith and Matt Munisteri
- 2014: On The Nature Of Strings (Flying Fortress Records) – Solo CD by Whit Smith
- 2016: Chordination, Vol. 3 – Instructional DVD by Whit Smith
- 2007: Elana James (Snarf Records) – Solo CD by Elana James
- 2011: Elana James's Hot Fiddle: Introduction to Violin Improvisation – Instructional DVD by Elana James
- 2015: Black Beauty (Snarf Records) – Solo CD by Elana James
