= Springvale Botanical Cemetery =

Cemetery in Greater Dandenong City, Victoria, Australia

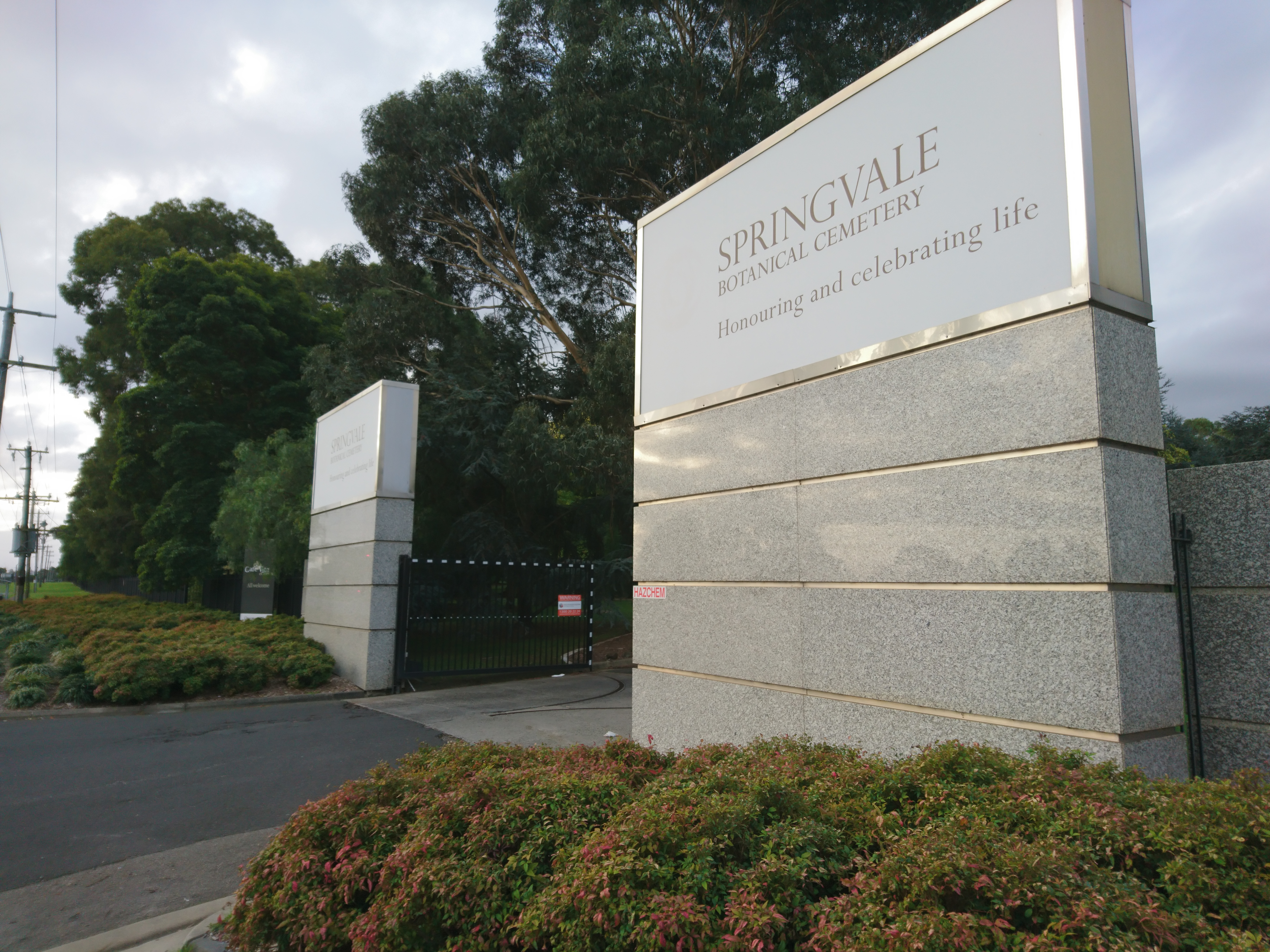
- Springvale Botanical Cemetery's Princes Highway entrance.
- Interactive map of Springvale Botanical Cemetery

Details
- Established: 1901
- Location: Springvale, Victoria
- Country: Australia
- Coordinates: 37°56′33″S 145°10′32″E
- Website: Springvale Botanical Cemetery
- Find a Grave: Springvale Botanical Cemetery

The Springvale Botanical Cemetery is the largest crematorium and memorial park in Victoria, Australia, located in the southeastern Melbourne suburb of Springvale.

== History ==
Originally known as The Necropolis Springvale, the cemetery commenced operations in 1901. Between 1904 and 1952 it was served by its own railway branch line and station, by which coffins, passengers and staff were conveyed to the cemetery. The first cremation took place at Springvale in April 1905. According to the Southern Metropolitan Cemeteries Trust, there have been approximately 473,000 cremations and 162,000 burials at the Springvale Botanical Cemetery.

In 2006, the cemetery was renamed the Springvale Botanical Cemetery to reflect its increasing botanical significance, which includes original plantings of two bunya pines, palms and gums. It is now administered by the Southern Metropolitan Cemeteries Trust, which manages nine cemeteries in all, including the Melbourne General Cemetery, St Kilda Cemetery and Dandenong Community Cemetery.

== Notable interments ==
- Frank Bladin (1898–1978), RAAF commander
- Scobie Breasley (1914–2006), champion jockey
- Sir Henry George "Harry" Chauvel (1865–1945), WWI Australian general
- A. R. Chisholm (1888–1981), French language scholar
- Sir Zelman Cowen (1919–2011), governor-general
- Cyril Clowes (1892–1968), soldier
- Erle Cox (1873–1950), author
- Frank Crean (1916–2008), deputy prime minister
- Bernard Cronin (1884–1968), author
- Judith Durham (1943–2022), singer, songwriter
- Jack Dyer (1913–2003), footballer
- James Fowler (1863–1940), politician, author
- Cathy Godbold (1974–2018), actress
- Robert Grieve VC (1889–1957), soldier
- Charles Hegyalji (1956–1998), gangster
- Walter Hume (1873–1943), inventor, concrete pipe developer
- Richard Kelliher VC (1910–1963), soldier
- Graham Knight (1931–2026), Australian rules football player
- Jim Lawn (1902–1972), footballer
- Jack Little (1908–1986), media personality
- Rosemary Margan (1937–2017), radio and television personality
- John McEwen (1900–1980), prime minister
- Bert Newton (1938–2021) TV and radio presenter, entertainer and actor
- Bess Norriss (1878–1939), artist
- Horace Petty (1904–1982), politician
- Tracy Pew (1957–1986), musician
- Dorothy Porter (1954–2008), poet
- Julia Rapke (1886–1959), women's rights activist
- Ethel Tracy Richardson (1877–1942), nursing sister, army matron-in-chief, honorary major
- Macpherson Robertson (1859–1945), chocolate manufacturer, philanthropist
- John Ryan VC (1890–1941), soldier
- Reginald Sholl (1902–1988), Supreme Court justice, diplomat
- Billy Snedden (1926–1987), politician
- Charles Tait (1868–1933), film maker, theatrical entrepreneur
- Bud Tingwell (1923–2009), actor
- Fannie Eleanor Williams (1884–1963), scientist
- Kath Williams (1895–1975), trade unionist, equal pay campaigner
- Tommy Woodcock (1905–1985), Phar Lap's handler
- Bill Woodfull (1897–1965), cricketer
- Henry Wynter (1886–1945), soldier

== War graves ==
The Botanical Cemetery contains the war graves of 156 Commonwealth service personnel, from both World Wars. The Commonwealth War Graves Commission (CWGC) commemorates 65 Commonwealth service personnel cremated during World War II at Springvale Crematorium whose ashes remain here.

Within two acres of the Botanical Cemetery, beyond the crematorium, lies the CWGC's Springvale War Cemetery, created in World War II, where are buried 607 Commonwealth service personnel and 4 Dutch personnel. It contains a Cross of Sacrifice unveiled in 1948. In the form of bronze plaques on the rear wall of the shelter behind the Cross is the Victoria Cremation Memorial to 75 Commonwealth service personnel cremated within the State of Victoria whose ashes were laid where a memorial could not be sited.

== See also ==
- Luciano Rossetti Mausoleum
