= Swingin' Stampede =

Studio album by The Hot Club of Cowtown
- Released: September 1, 1998
- Genres: Western swing; swing
- Length: 38:27
- Label: Hightone Records
- Producer: The Hot Club of Cowtown

The Hot Club of Cowtown chronology
Swingin' Stampede (1998)	Tall Tales (1999)

Swingin' Stampede is the 1998 all-cover debut album of western swing group The Hot Club of Cowtown.

== Track listing ==
1. "If I Had Someone Else" (Harris/Darcey/Stanley) – 2:52
2. "Silver Dew on the Blue Grass Tonight" (Burt) – 3:04
3. "Somebody Loves Me" (Gershwin) – 2:10
4. "My Confession" (Wills) – 3:00
5. "Snowflake Reel" (Traugutt) – 2:01
6. "End of the Line" (Gimble/Wills) – 2:53
7. "T and J Waltz" (Maddux) – 2:53
8. "Sweet Jenny Lee" (Donaldson) – 2:32
9. "Mission to Moscow" (Powell) – 2:12
10. "You Can't Break My Heart" (Cooley/Rogers) – 3:15
11. "Red Bird" – 1:40
12. "Chinatown, My Chinatown" (Jerome/Schwartz) – 3:00
13. "Just Friends" (Wills) – 3:22
14. "Ida Red" – 3:06

== Personnel ==
- Whit Smith - Vocals, Guitar, Producer
- Elana Fremerman - Vocals, Fiddle, Producer
- Billy Horton - Backup Vocals, Upright Bass, Producer
- Johnny Gimble - Fiddle (Tracks 1, 4, 8, 14)
- T Jarrod Bonta - Piano (Tracks 8, 10)
- Jeremy Wakefield - Steel Guitar (Tracks 8, 10)
- Mike Maddux - Accordion (Track 7)
- Steve Starnes - Engineering
- Spencer Starnes - Engineering
- Ed Temple - Cover Illustration
- George Brainard - Photography
- Cindy Pascarello - Design

== Reception ==
Professional ratings
Review scores
Source	Rating
AllMusic	4/5 stars

Jim Smith, in his review of the album for AllMusic, said the group sounded "like a fired-up, pared down version of the Texas Playboys".
