= Spring Vale Cemetery railway line =

Railway line in Australia

Coordinates: 37°56′46″S 145°10′57″E

Spring Vale Cemetery
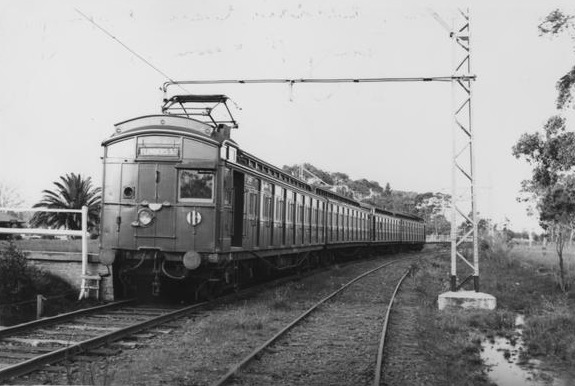
- Tait train at Spring Vale Cemetery station

Overview
- Status: Dismantled line
- Owner: Victorian Railways (VR) (1904–1951)
- Locale: Melbourne, Victoria, Australia
- Termini: Springvale; Cemetery
- Continues from: Cranbourne & Pakenham lines
- Connecting lines: Cranbourne & Pakenham lines
- Stations: 1 current station; 1 former station

Service
- Type: Former Melbourne suburban service
- Operator(s): Victorian Railways (VR) (1904–1951)

History
- Opened: 7 February 1904
- Electrified: 11 December 1922
- Closed: 19 December 1951

Technical
- Line length: 2.650 km (1.647 mi)
- Number of tracks: Double track
- Track gauge: 1,600 mm (5 ft 3 in)
- Maximum incline: 1 in 50 (2%)

The Spring Vale Cemetery railway line, in Melbourne, Australia, branched from the now Pakenham Line at Springvale railway station, for a short 1.87 km (1.16 mi) journey to the Spring Vale Cemetery. The terminus was a railway station of the same name.

== History ==
The Spring Vale Cemetery branch line and associated station were opened on 1 March 1904 following completion of construction in December 1902. The line was used to transport corpses, funeral cortèges and visitors to the Necropolis. Special hearse vans were constructed to transport the coffins and wreaths. The line was electrified in December 1922. Mortuary services ceased in 1943 and the visitor's service was suspended from 10 December 1950, following the end of the statewide 55-day coal strike. Formal closure was only a book date, being 19 December 1951.

== Current status ==
Throughout the first few months of 1951, the line was dismantled back to the western boundary of the Sandown Park Racecourse, and eventually back to the station side of Sandown Road. By the 1970s, the visible remains of the branch line included a short stub of the line, known as "Siding B", and an electrical sub-station near where the branch junctioned, as well as a short section of the alignment between Sandown Road and the racecourse boundary. A stanchion base could be seen at the end of the Downard Lawn in the Necropolis.

By 2010, the remaining track, overhead power lines and supporting stanchions had been removed, along with other sidings east of Springvale station. The electrical sub-station building remains, along with the rail reservation up to Sandown Park Racecourse, although it is now crossed by Sandown Road.

A commemorative plaque has been placed at the site of the former Cemetery platform, located in the grounds of the Eucalypt lawn of the Springvale Botanical Cemetery.

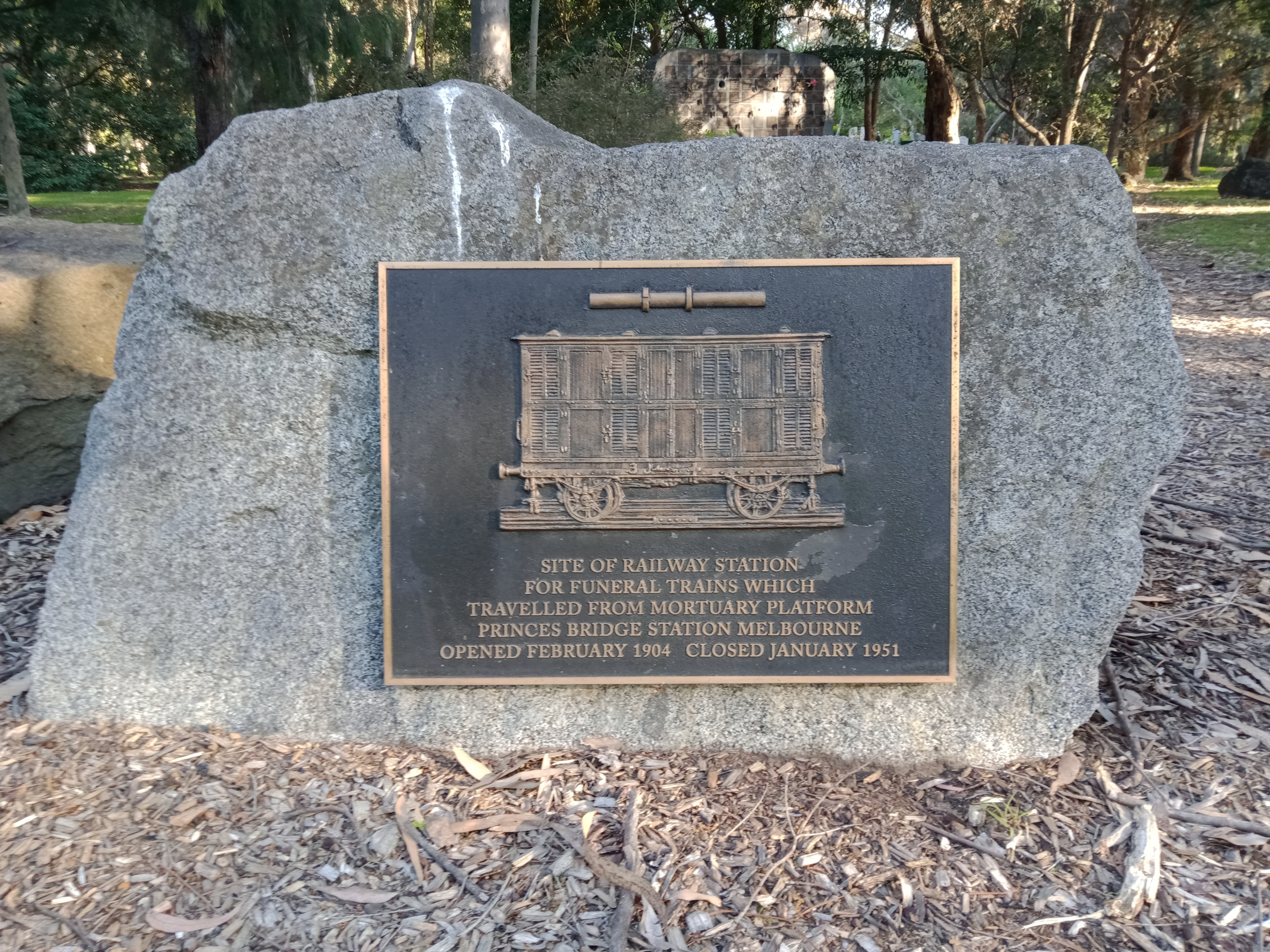
Plaque of location of former railway

Another commemorative plaque marking the location of the base of the supported electric overhead wires for the railway is located in the AC Downard lawn.

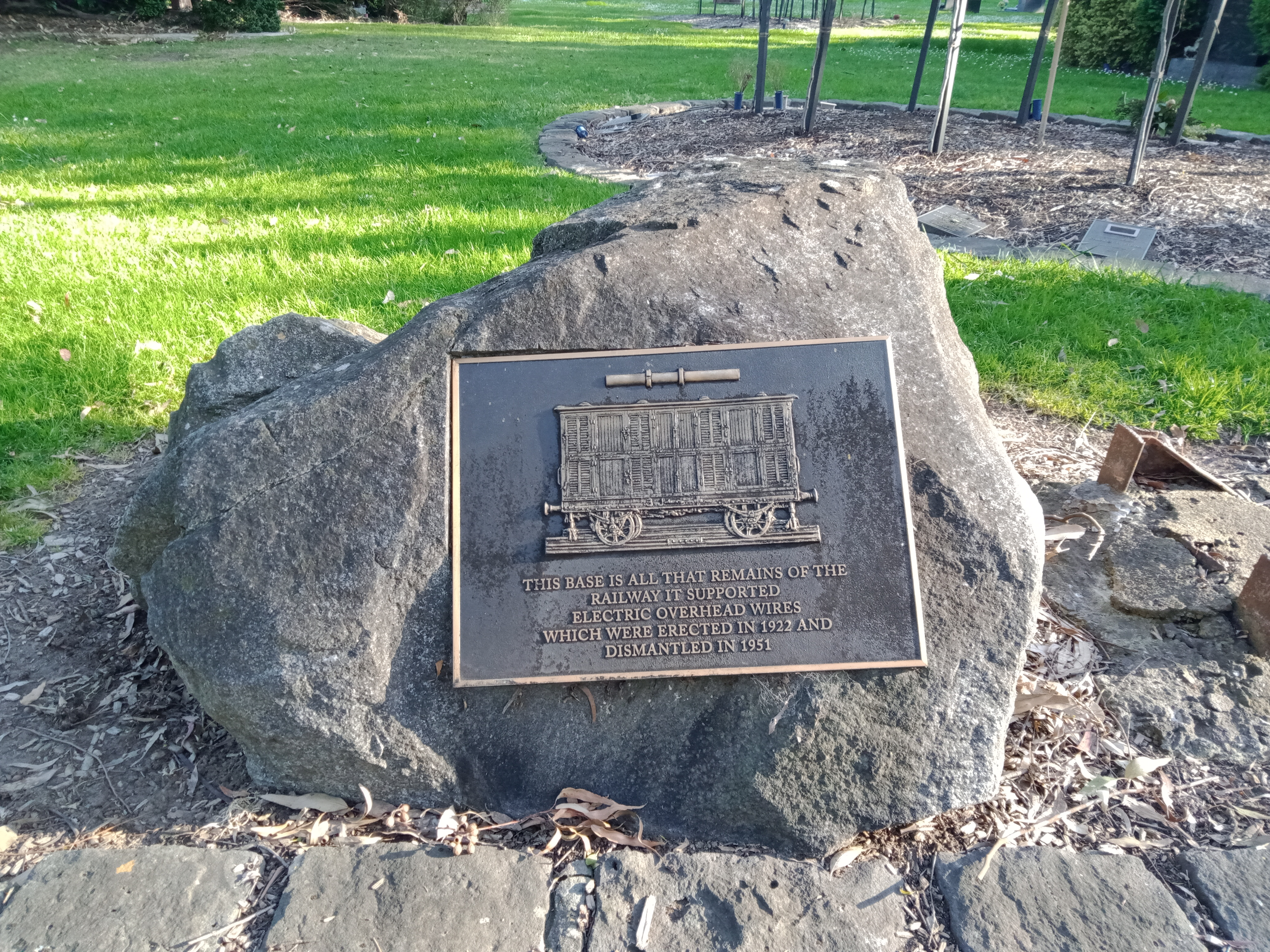
Plaque of base of former railway

== Station histories ==
Station	Opened	Closed	Age	Notes
Springvale	1 September 1880 || || data-sort-value=52,798 | 144 years	Formerly Spring Vale		
Cemetery	7 February 1904 || 19 December 1951 || data-sort-value=17,482 | 47 years	Also known as Necropolis or Spring Vale Cemetery		

== See also ==
- List of closed Melbourne railway stations
- List of Melbourne railway stations
