= Spring Vale Cemetery railway station =

Former railway station in Victoria, Australia

Coordinates: 37°56′11″S 145°10′57″E

Spring Vale Cemetery
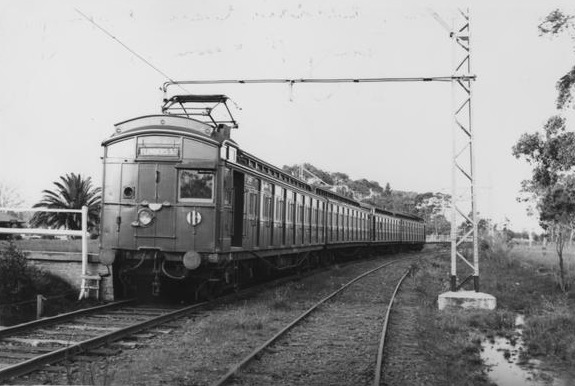

General information
- Line: Spring Vale Cemetery
- Platforms: 1
- Tracks: 2

Other information
- Status: Closed

History
- Opened: 7 February 1904
- Closed: 1952

Services
Preceding station	Disused railways	Following station
Springvale	Spring Vale Cemetery	Terminus
	List of closed railway stations in Melbourne	
Location

Springvale Cemetery station was a railway station in Melbourne, Australia, serving the Springvale Cemetery. It had its own branch line, which split from the Cranbourne and Pakenham lines at Springvale station. It was opened in March 1904, to transport coffins, passengers and staff to the cemetery, and closed during 1952, at a time when many small branch lines were being closed by Victorian Railways.
