= Stampede (radio play) =

- Genre: drama play
- Running time: 30 mins
- Country of origin: Australia
- Language: English
- Written by: Bernard Cronin
- Original release: 1934

Stampede is a 1934 Australian radio play by Bernard Cronin.

The play was performed by the BBC in 1938 and was repeated a number of times. Notably, it was the first Australian play to be broadcast in Arabic.

The play was produced again in 1936, 1940, 1941, 1945 and 1951. It was also played on stage.

The play was published in a 1937 collection of one act Australian plays.

According to one review "the nervous tension caused by a prolonged drought is used effectively. The growth of suspicion, the smouldering disagreements bursting into fierce flame as the drought continues are cleverly drawn, and the climax when the thunder rolls and the rain pours down is worked naturally and successfully." The Bulletin said " It does not carry conviction as an intimate revelation, but it is well made and should play satisfactorily."

== Premise ==
"The scene is the kitchen-living-room of a selector’s home during a severe drought. George and Mary Painter live here, and the strain of a hard bush life has turned Mary from a fresh young girl into a prematurely middle-aged woman. Why doesn’t it rain? Driven to desperation by the weather, husband and wife are getting on each other’s nerves. Then there is Jim Jackson, thef arm hand. Has Painter any real justification for his suspicions about Jim and Mary?"
