= Springvale railway station =

Railway station in Melbourne, Australia

Springvale
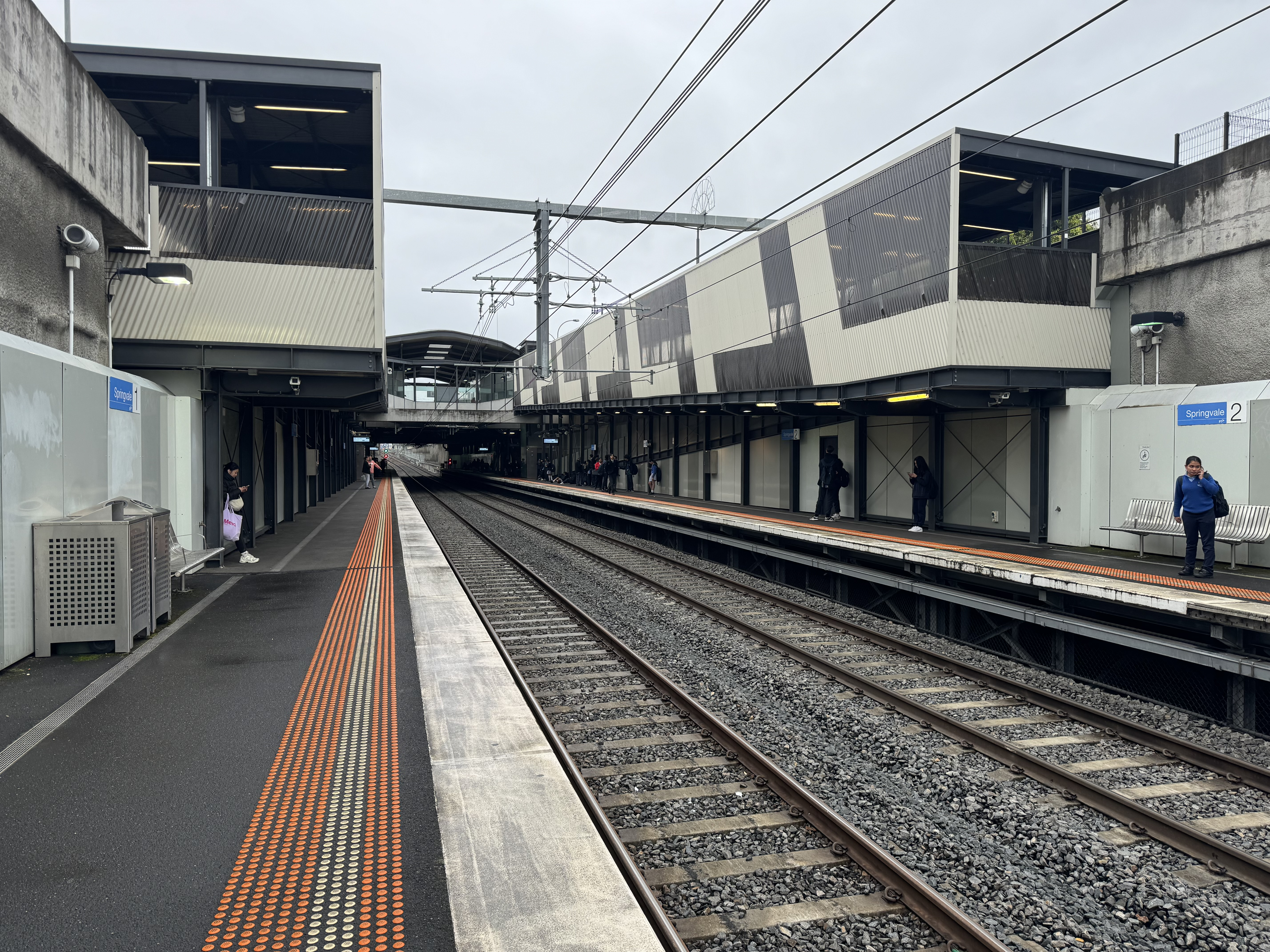
- Westbound view from Platform 1, October 2024

General information
- Location: Springvale Road, Springvale, Victoria 3171; City of Greater Dandenong; Australia
- Coordinates: 37°56′58″S 145°09′11″E
- System: PTV commuter rail station
- Owner: VicTrack
- Operator: Metro Trains
- Lines: Cranbourne; Pakenham
- Distance: 24.50 kilometres from Southern Cross
- Platforms: 2 side
- Tracks: 2
- Connections: Bus

Construction
- Structure type: Below ground
- Depth: 6.5 metres (21 feet)
- Parking: 261 spaces
- Cycle facilities: Yes
- Accessible: Yes—step free access

Other information
- Status: Operational, premium station
- Station code: SPG
- Fare zone: Myki zone 2
- Website: Public Transport Victoria

History
- Opened: 1 September 1880; 146 years ago
- Rebuilt: 22 April 2014
- Electrified: December 1922 (1500 V DC overhead)
- Former names: Spring Vale (1880–1972)

Passengers
- 2005–2006: 1,108,105
- 2006–2007: 1,257,598 ▲13.49%
- 2007–2008: 1,370,709 ▲8.99%
- 2008–2009: 1,608,850 ▲17.37%
- 2009–2010: 1,754,276 ▲9.03%
- 2010–2011: 1,712,614 ▼2.37%
- 2011–2012: 1,597,795 ▼6.7%
- 2012–2013: Not measured
- 2013–2014: 1,392,656 ▼12.83%
- 2014–2015: 1,715,628 ▲23.19%
- 2015–2016: 1,972,168 ▲14.95%
- 2016–2017: 1,694,804 ▼14.06%
- 2017–2018: 1,495,341 ▼11.76%
- 2018–2019: 1,509,425 ▲0.94%
- 2019–2020: 1,295,050 ▼14.2%
- 2020–2021: 754,300 ▼41.75%
- 2021–2022: 750,700 ▼0.47%

Services
Preceding station	Metro Trains	Following station
Westall towards Watergardens or Sunbury via Metro Tunnel	Cranbourne line	Sandown Park towards Cranbourne or East Pakenham
Westall towards Watergardens or Sunbury via Metro Tunnel	Pakenham line	Sandown Park towards Cranbourne or East Pakenham
Former services
Preceding station	Disused railways	Following station
Terminus	Spring Vale Cemetery line	Spring Vale Cemetery
Track layout
Location

Springvale station is a railway station operated by Metro Trains Melbourne on the Pakenham and Cranbourne lines, both part of the Melbourne rail network. It serves the south-eastern suburb of Springvale, in Melbourne, Victoria, Australia. Springvale station is a below ground premium station, featuring two side platforms. It opened on 1 September 1880, with the current station provided in 2014.

Initially opened as Spring Vale, the station was given its current name of Springvale on 29 February 1972.

== History ==
Springvale station opened on 1 September 1880, almost three years after the railway line from Oakleigh was extended to Dandenong. Like the suburb itself, the station was named after the Spring Vale Hotel, the proprietor inspired by the natural springs in the area for travellers and stock between Melbourne and Dandenong. The name was also inspired by a place near the Bog of Allen in the proprietor's native Ireland.

In 1964, boom barriers replaced interlocked gates at the former Springvale Road level crossing, which was located at the up end of the station.

In 1975, the signal box was provided with a new relay interlocking system. Also occurring in that year, a crossover was abolished at the up end of the station, with a new crossover provided at the down end. In 1976, the goods platform was abolished.

On 7 June 1996, Springvale was upgraded to a premium station.

The remnant of a former branch line, which operated to Spring Vale Cemetery station, was located at the down end of the station. In 1922, it was provided with overhead wiring. In 1952, the majority of the line was dismantled, with the remaining portion of the line becoming a siding. In October 2002, it was booked out of use and, in August 2008, the associated points and signals, the crossover and overhead wiring were removed.

On 30 January 2012, the signal box was abolished, with control transferred to the Dandenong signal box. In mid-2013, construction commenced on a grade separation project to eliminate the Springvale Road level crossing, immediately adjacent to the station. As part of this project, a new station was constructed below street level, which opened on 22 April 2014.

== Platforms, facilities and services ==
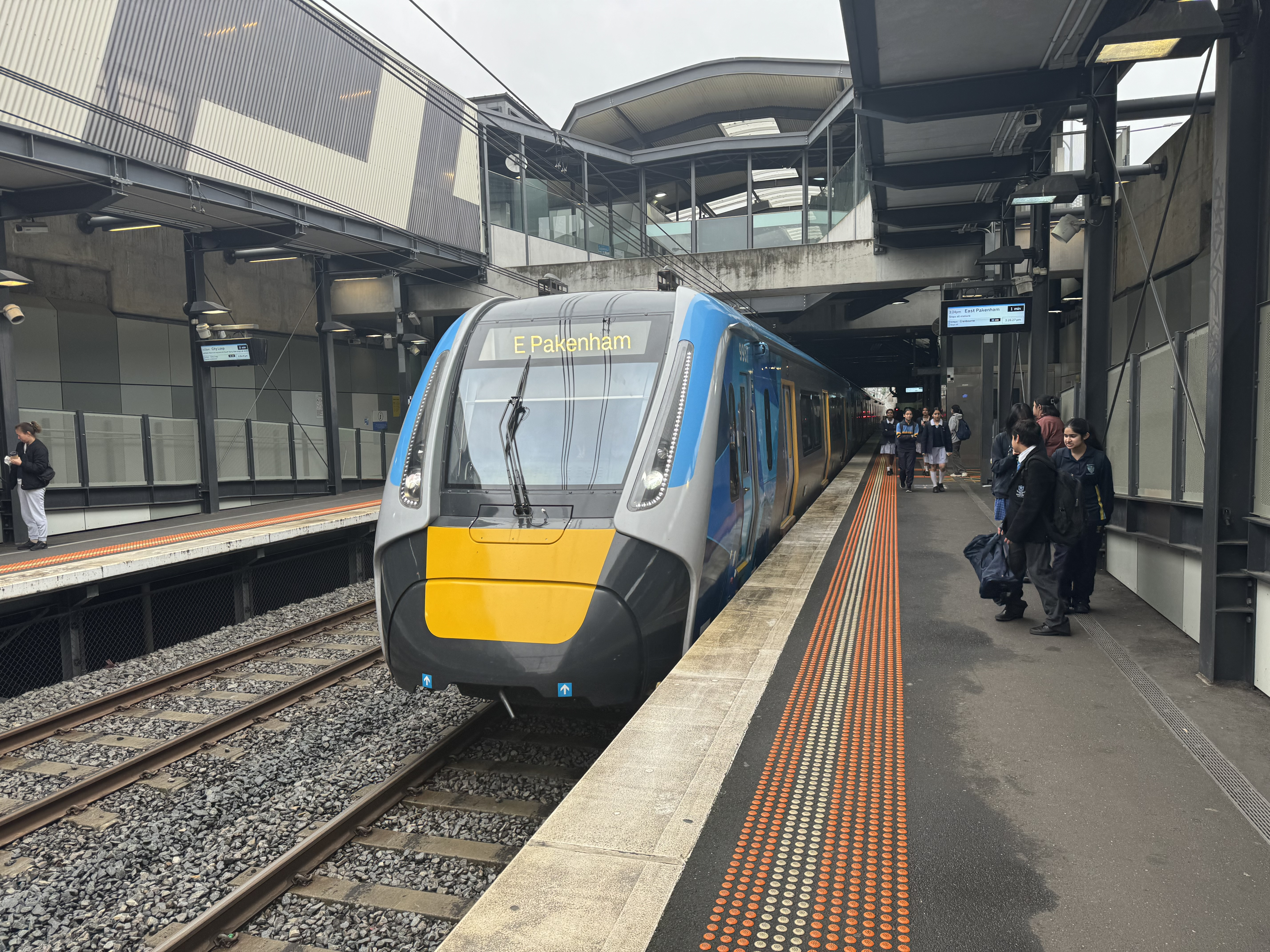
A High Capacity Metro Train on an East Pakenham-bound service arrives at Platform 2, October 2024

Springvale has two side platforms, with a concourse above on ground level. The concourse features a customer service window, an enclosed waiting room and toilets. Inside this enclosed waiting room there is a small coffee kiosk. Access to the platforms is provided by stairs and ramps.

It is serviced by Metro Trains' Pakenham and Cranbourne line services.

Springvale platform arrangement
Platform	Line	Destination	Via	Service Type	Notes	Source
1	Cranbourne line Pakenham line	West Footscray, Watergardens or Sunbury	Town Hall	Limited express	Services to West Footscray only operate during weekday peaks and early weekend mornings	
2	Cranbourne line Pakenham line	Dandenong, Cranbourne or East Pakenham		All stations	Services to Dandenong only operate during weekday peaks.	

== Transport links ==
Kinetic Melbourne operates one SmartBus route via Springvale station, under contract to Public Transport Victoria:

- SmartBus 902 : Chelsea station – Westfield Airport West

Ventura Bus Lines operates five routes via Springvale station, under contract to Public Transport Victoria:

- 705 : to Mordialloc station (peak-hour only)
- 811 : Dandenong station – Brighton
- 813 : Dandenong station – Waverley Gardens Shopping Centre
- 814 : Springvale South – Dandenong station
- 885 : to Glen Waverley station
