= Bernard Cronin =

Australian author and journalist

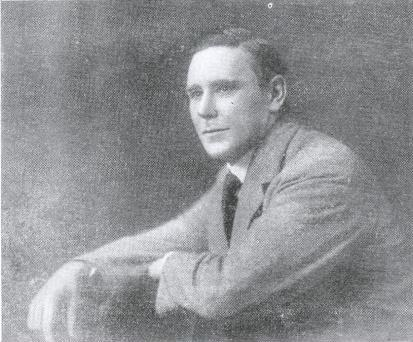
- Born: Bernard Charles Cronin; 18 March 1884; Ealing, England
- Died: 9 June 1968 (aged 84); Camberwell, Victoria, Australia
- Occupations: Writer and journalist
- Writing career
- Pen name: Dennis Adair, Hugh Bohun, Wallace Dixon, Tas East, Eric North, Stephen Grey (when writing jointly with Capel Boake (Doris Boake Kerr))

Bernard Cronin (18 March 1884 – 9 June 1968) was an Australian author and journalist. With Gertrude Hart, he founded the Old Derelicts' Club in 1920 which later became the Society of Australian Authors.

== Life ==
Cronin was born in Ealing, Middlesex, England, second son of Charles Frederick Cronin (1859–1887), an auctioneer, and Laura née Marshall (1850–1934). His father was advised to go to Australia for the sake of his health. Charles and his wife set off in 1886, leaving Bernard and his brother in England in the care of their grandmother and aunts. In Mitcham, South Australia, Bernard's father succumbed to his illness and died. Laura returned to London and in 1889 married Frederick Cecil Browne, who had taken her under his wing during her husband's illness and accompanied her back to England, and the two of them returned to Australia in the same year, accompanied by Bernard's brother Laurence Kimberley. Bernard himself followed them to Australia at the age of six in 1890 in the care of the captain of RMS Austral. During the voyage the young Bernard nearly accidentally killed an able seaman who was painting the ship's side whilst holding on to the deck with one hand. Young Bernard jumped on the man's hand "just to see what happened". The man let go, but was rescued.

He emerged from his education in 1901 with a diploma in agriculture, and is the first recipient of the gold medal, from the Dookie Agricultural College, now part of the Goulburn Ovens Institute of Technical and Further Education in Victoria and still Australia's premier agricultural college. In 1908 he joined his brother Laurie (also a graduate of Dookie Agricultural College) in a cattle-farming venture in Tasmania which, due to the forestation and other natural conditions which had defeated many settlers before them, was not successful.

Cronin married a farmer's daughter, Victoria Maud Ferres, on 11 March 1908. In 1913 he went back to Melbourne, where he worked as a salesman before getting a job as a clerk in the Department of the Navy and began to devote his spare time to writing. He published his first novel The Coastlanders, set in Tasmania, in 1918. He went on to write numerous novels, short stories, poems and a radio play, Stampede (1937), using his own name and a number of pseudonyms, such as Dennis Adair, Hugh Bohun, Wallace Dixon, Tas East and Eric North. He also jointly used the pseudonym Stephen Grey when writing with Capel Boake (the pseudonym of Doris Boake Kerr).

In the 1920s Cronin worked for the Melbourne Herald, then between 1936 and 1957 contributed over 50 articles to Walkabout and also in the 1950s was a contributor to the Melbourne Sun. During World War II he worked as a publicity censor in Victoria and Western Australia.

In 1920 Cronin and Gertrude Hart founded the Old Derelicts' Club for emerging writers. Their club became the Society of Australian Authors in 1927 and its first president was Cronin. Cronin started the Quill Club in 1933 and he then thought that the society began to become too political. The Society of Australian Authors ceased to operate in 1936. He was a member of the International PEN Club in Melbourne and he was granted life membership in 1961.

He was a keen student of the Bible and supporter of the British-Israelist movement. In his later life he took up woodcarving and painting. He died at his home in East Camberwell, Victoria on 9 June 1968 and was buried in Springvale Cemetery.

Cronin Street in McKellar, a suburb of Canberra, is named after him and is one of a number of streets in the area named after Australian authors.

== Partial bibliography ==
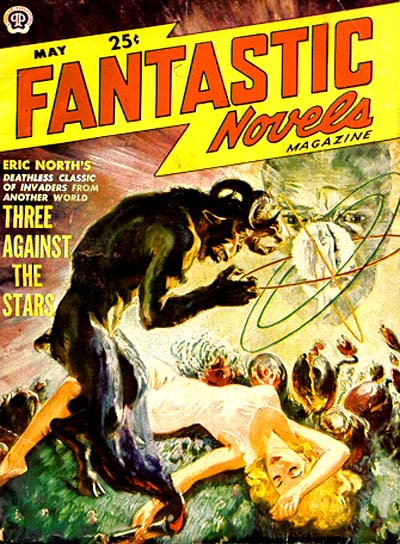
Cronin's 1924 novel The Satyr was reprinted as Three Against the Stars in the May 1950 issue of Fantastic Novels, under his "Eric North" byline

- The Flame: A Story of What Might Have Been (as Eric North) (1916)
- The Coastlanders (1918)
- Timber Wolves (1920)
- Bluff Stakes (1922)
- Kangaroo Rhymes (with Capel Boake as Stephen Gray) (1922)
- Salvage (1923)
- Toad (1924, serially in the Melbourne Herald) (also published, with some changes, as The Green Flame (as Eric North) in A. Merritt's Fantasy Magazine: Vol. 1, No. 4 July 1950)
- The Satyr (1924, The Melbourne Herald)
- Red Dawson (1927)
- White Gold (1927)
- Dragonfly (1928)
- The Treasure of the Tropics (1928)
- Bracken (1929)
- Romance of the Licensing Court (1930)
- From the Casebooks of Dr. Sars (1930)
- The Golden Skull (Illustrated by Robert Strange, 3 November 1931 in Chums magazine, No. 2043 Vol. 40, pp. 349–351)
- Bushranging Silhouettes. Tales (1932) (with Arthur Russell)
- The Bridge of Death (1932) (in The Boys' Budget)
- The Sow's Ear (1933)
- Black Tragedy (as Hugh Bohun) (c. 1933)
- The Valley of Stars (1934)
- The Murchison Murders (1934) (editor) – Author: Arthur Upfield
- The Need for Love (1935) (editor) – Author: Elizabeth Powell
- The Epic of Mr. Plate (5 August 1935 in The Sydney Mail, pp. 12–14)
- Stampede (1937), a radio play
- Story Writing (1937)
- Who Killed Marie Westhoven? (as Eric North) (bet. 1921 & 1940)
- Death Rides the Desert. A Novel (1940) (as Dennis Adair)
- The Shadows Mystery (1944)
- How Runs the Road (1948)
- The Shadows Mystery (1950)
- Three Against The Stars (retitling of The Satyr, as Eric North in Fantastic Novels Magazine: Vol. 4, No 1) (May 1950)
- National Theatre Arts Festival: ballet, opera, drama (1951) (editor)
- The Ant Men (as Eric North) (1953)
- Star Gem (Eric North?) (1954)
- A Chip On My Shoulder (as Eric North) (1955)
- The Name is Smith (as Eric North) (1957 (US))
- The Second Sphere (as Eric North in Fantastic Universe Science Fiction magazine) (October 1956)
- Nobody Stops Me (as Eric North) (1960)
- The North Wind (song – words by Bernard Cronin, music by Mabel Down)
- Papers (1890–1969)
