= Springvale Airport (Western Australia) =

- IATA: ZVG; ICAO: none

Summary
- Airport type: Public
- Location: Springvale, Western Australia
- Elevation AMSL: 4,185 ft / 1,276 m
- Coordinates: 17°47′13″S 127°40′12″E

Map
- Location in Western Australia

Runways
Direction	Length		Surface
Direction	m	ft	Surface
	1,158	3,799
- Source: DAFIF

Springvale Airport (IATA: ZVG) is an airport near Springvale, in the Kimberley region of Western Australia.

== See also ==
- List of airports in Western Australia
- Transport in Australia § Aviation
