= List of political families =

This is a list of prominent and notable political families. For the sake of brevity, monarchical dynasties are not included, as such a list already exists.

== Abkhazia ==
The Ardzinba family

- Vladislav Ardzinba (first president)
  - Svetlana Jergenia (wife of Vladislav, first lady of Abkhazia, vice-presidential candidate)
    - Anri Jergenia (first cousin of Svetlana, prime minister)
  - Inal Ardzinba (nephew of Vladislav, minister for foreign affairs)
- Adgur Ardzinba (minister for economy)
- Dmitry Ardzinba (member of parliament)

== Afghanistan ==
The Haqqani family

- Jalaluddin Haqqani (founder of the Haqqani network of the Taliban)
  - Sirajuddin Haqqani (interior minister of the Islamic Emirate of Afghanistan)

The Karzai family

- Hamid Karzai (President of the Islamic Republic of Afghanistan, 2002–2014)
- Ahmed Wali Karzai (brother of Hamid Karzai; chairman of the Kandahar Provincial Council)

The Massoud family

- Ahmad Shah Massoud (leader of the Northern Alliance; defense minister of the Islamic State of Afghanistan)
  - Ahmad Massoud (leader of the National Resistance Front)

The Umar-Mujahid family

- Muhammad Umar Mujahid (founder of the Taliban; Supreme Leader of the Islamic Emirate of Afghanistan, 1996–2001)
  - Muhammad Yaqoob Mujahid (defense minister of the Islamic Emirate of Afghanistan)

The Rabbani family

- Burhanuddin Rabbani (leader of the Jamiat-e Islami; President of the Islamic State of Afghanistan, 1992–2001)
  - Salahuddin Rabbani (former Foreign Minister of the Islamic Republic of Afghanistan)

== Albania ==
The Hoxha family

- Hysen Hoxha (Albanian independence leader; uncle of Enver Hoxha)
- Enver Hoxha (First Secretary of the Albanian Labour Party, 1944–1985)
- Nexhmije Hoxha (member of the Central Committee of the Albanian Labour Party; wife of Enver Hoxha)

Peristeri family

- Manush Myftiu (Chairman of the Assembly of the Republic)
- Pilo Peristeri (member of the Central Committee of the Albanian Labour Party)

The Nano family (father-son)

- Thanas Nano (government broadcaster under Hoxha)
  - Fatos Nano (Prime Minister of Albania)

The Pashko family (spouses)

- Josif Pashko (member of the Central Committee of the Albanian Labour Party)
- Eleni Terezi (member of the Central Committee of the Albanian Labour Party)

The Shehu family

- Mehmet Shehu (Prime Minister of Albania, 1953–1981)
- Fiqrete Shehu (member of the Central Committee of the Albanian Labour Party)
- Kadri Hazbiu (member of the Central Committee of the Albanian Labour Party); brother-in-law of Mehmet Shehu)
- Fecor Shehu (nephew of Mehmet Shehu)

== Angola ==
The dos Santos–Van-Dúnem-Vieira Dias family

- José Eduardo dos Santos (President of Angola, 1979–2017)
- Welwitschia dos Santos (daughter of José Eduardo dos Santos; member of the National Assembly 2008–2010)
- Fernando da Piedade Dias dos Santos 'Nandó' (cousin of José Eduardo dos Santos; Vice-President of Angola, 2010–2012; Speaker of the National Assembly 2008–2010; Prime Minister 2002–2008)
- Cândido Pereira dos Santos Van-Dúnem (cousin of the president and Kopelipa and Jose Vieira Dias Van-Dunem; Defense Minister).
- José Vieira Dias Van-Dúnem (cousin of Kopelipa; Health Minister)
- Gen. Manuel Hélder Vieira Dias 'Kopelipa' (Minister of State and Chief of the Military Bureau of the President)
- Carlo Alberto Lopes (Finance Minister, brother-in-law of the President)
- Luzia Inglês Van-Dúnem Secretary-General of "OMA", the women's mass movement of the ruling party MPLA
  - Afonso Van-Dúnem M'Binda (husband of Luzia Inglês Van-Dúnem; Minister of External Relations 1985–1988)
  - Fernando José de França Dias Van-Dúnem (cousin of Kopelipa; Prime Minister 1991–1992; 1996–1999)
  - Pedro de Castro van Dúnem, 1942–1997 (Minister of External Relations of Angola 1989–1992; Minister of Public Works and Urban Affairs 1992–1997)

== Antigua and Barbuda ==
The Bird family

- Sir Vere Cornwall Bird (Prime Minister of Antigua and Barbuda, 1981–1994)
  - Lester Bird (son of Sir Vere Cornwall Bird; Prime Minister of Antigua and Barbuda, 1994–2004)
  - Vere Bird, Jr. (son of Sir Vere Cornwall Bird; Member of Parliament)
    - Maria Bird-Browne (niece of Lester Bird; Member of Parliament)
    - Gaston Browne (husband of Maria, Prime Minister of Antigua and Barbuda, 2014–present)

The Frank family (uncle-nephew)

- Sir Hilbourne Frank (Chairperson of the Barbuda Council)
  - Mackenzie Frank (Chairperson of the Barbuda Council (2022-2024); Vice Chairperson of the Barbuda Council (2024–present); Senator (2004-2014))

== Armenia ==
The Demirchyan family (father-son)

- Karen Demirchyan (First Secretary of the Armenian Communist Party, 1974–1988; National Assembly speaker, 1999)
  - Stepan Demirchyan (leader of the People's Party of Armenia, opposition candidate during the 2003 presidential election)

The Sargsyan brothers

- Vazgen Sargsyan (Defense Minister of Armenia 1991–1992, 1995–1999; Prime Minister of Armenia, 1999)
- Aram Sargsyan (Prime Minister of Armenia, 1999–2000)

The Margaryan family (father-son)

- Andranik Margaryan (Prime Minister of Armenia, 2000–2007)
  - Taron Margaryan (Mayor of Yerevan, 2011–2018)

== Austria ==
The Habsburg family of Austria (grandfather–father–children)

- Charles I (Karl I) (Emperor of Austria 1916–1918, King of Hungary 1916–1918)
  - Otto von Habsburg (German Member of the European Parliament), son of Charles I
    - Karl Habsburg-Lothringen (former Austrian Member of the European Parliament), son of Otto
    - Georg von Habsburg (György) (Hungarian Ambassador), son of Otto
    - Archduchess Walburga of Austria, Member of the Swedish Parliament, daughter of Otto

== Azerbaijan ==
The Aliyev family (father-son)

- Heydar Aliyev (President of Azerbaijan, 1993–2003)
  - Ilham Aliyev (President of Azerbaijan, 2003–)
- Mehriban Aliyeva (Vice President of Azerbaijan, 2017–, wife of Ilham Aliyev)

== The Bahamas ==
The Butler family

- Sir Milo Butler (Governor-General of the Bahamas, 1973–1979)
- Loretta Butler-Turner

The Pindling family

- Sir Lynden Pindling (Prime Minister of the Bahamas, 1967–1992)
- Dame Marguerite Pindling (Governor-General of the Bahamas, 2014–2019; wife)
  - Michelle Pindling-Sands (daughter)

The Symonette family

- Sir Roland Symonette (Premier of the Bahamas, 1964–1967)
  - Robert Symonette (Speaker of the House of Assembly; son)
  - Brent Symonette (Deputy Prime Minister; son)

The Turnquest family

- Sir Orville Turnquest (Governor-General of the Bahamas, 1995–2001)
  - Tommy Turnquest (Minister of National Security; son)

The Foulkes family

- Sir Arthur Foulkes (Governor-General of the Bahamas, 2010–2014)
  - Dion Foulkes (Minister of Labour and Social Services; son)

== Bangladesh ==
Sheikhs of Tungipara

- Sheikh Mujibur Rahman, President of Bangladesh, 1971; Prime Minister of Bangladesh, (1972–1975)
  - Sheikh Kamal - eldest son of Sheikh Mujib.
  - Sheikh Jamal - son of Sheikh Mujibur Rahman.
  - Sheikh Hasina (eldest daughter of Sheikh Mujibur Rahman; Prime Minister of Bangladesh, 1996–2001 and 2009–2024).
    - Sajeeb Wazed – son of Sheikh Hasina, on 25 February 2009, Wazed officially joined the Awami League as a primary member of the Rangpur District
  - Sheikh Rehana - youngest daughter of Sheikh Mujibur Rahman
    - Tulip Siddiq - niece of Sheikh Mujibur Rahman, daughter of Sheikh Rehana, Member of British Parliament
- Sheikh Abu Naser - brother of Sheikh Mujibur Rahman, member of Mukti Bahini, freedom fighter of Bangladesh Liberation war
  - Sheikh Helal Uddin - son of Sheikh Abu Naser, Awami League politician and former member of parliament from Bagerhat-1
    - Sheikh Tonmoy - son of Sheikh Helal Uddin, Awami League politician and former member of parliament from Bagerhat-2
  - Sheikh Fazlul Haque Mani - nephew of the Sheikh Mujibur Rahman, founder of the Mujib Bahini, freedom fighter of Bangladesh Liberation war, founding chairman of the Jubo League
    - Sheikh Fazle Noor Taposh - son of Sheikh Fazlul Haque Mani, former Mayor of South Dhaka
  - Sheikh Fazlul Karim Selim - nephew of Sheikh Mujibur Rahman and brother of Sheikh Fazlul Haque Moni. Nine time member of parliament from Gopalganj-2, presidium member of the Awami League, former minister of health and family welfare, former president of Jubo League, former chairman of the Parliamentary Standinh Committee on Health and Family Welfare Ministry.
    - Sheikh Fazle Fahim - Sheikh Fazle Fahim, son of Sheikh Fazlul Karim Selim. Former president of Federation of Bangladesh Chambers of Commerce & Industries
  - Sheikh Shahidul Islam, nephew of Sheikh Mujibur Rahman

Zia Family

- Ziaur Rahman - President of Bangladesh (1977–1981) and Chief of Army Staff
- Begum Khaleda Zia, (wife of Ziaur Rahman; Prime Minister of Bangladesh, 1991–1996 and 2001–2006).
  - Tarique Rahman - eldest son of Ziaur Rahman and Khaleda Zia; Prime Minister of Bangladesh and chairman of the Bangladesh Nationalist Party
  - Arafat Rahman - youngest son of Ziaur Rahman and Khaleda Zia; former chairman of the Development Committee of Bangladesh Cricket Board
- Sayeed Iskander - was a Bangladeshi politician and army major. He was a former member of parliament and brother of Khaleda Zia.
- Khurshida Jahan - was the Minister of Women's and Children's Affairs of Bangladesh from 2001 to 2006, serving under her sister, Prime Minister Khaleda Zia.
- Shahrin Islam Tuhin - is a Bangladeshi politician and former Member of Parliament and Nephew of Khaleda Zia.
- Saiful Islam Duke - is a retired Lieutenant Commander of Bangladesh Navy. He is the nephew of Khaleda Zia.
- Md Mahabub Mojumder - is a Businessman and a Politician belonging to the Bangladesh Nationalist Party. He is a relative of Khaleda Zia.
- Md Mayen Mojumder - is Md Mahabub Mojumder's only son. He is a student at Milestone College in Uttara. He is a relative of Khaleda Zia.

Wakil family of Dinhata Descended from Wakil Saadatullah

- Maqbul Husayn, minister under the Maharaja of Cooch Behar State
  - Hussain Muhammad Ershad (1930–2019), President of Bangladesh and Chief of Army Staff
    - Saad Ershad (born 1983), former MP of Rangpur-3
  - Mozammel Hossain Lalu (1942–2014), former MP of Kurigram-3
    - Hossain Mokbul Shahriar (born 1974), former MP of Rangpur-1
  - Merina Rahman (born 1943), former MP
  - Ghulam Muhammed Quader (born 1948), former Commerce Minister

Nawabs of Dhaka

- Sir Khawaja Nazimuddin (former Governor General of Pakistan, former prime minister of Pakistan)
- Khan Saheb Khwaja Khairuddin
- Khwaja Nooruddin (founder of first Muslim English daily in India i.e. Star of India which later became The Morning News).
- Khwaja Shahabuddin
- Lt. Gen (retd) Khwaja Wasiuddin
- Farhat Banu (first Muslim woman elected to undivided Bengal Assembly)
- Begum Shamsunnahar Khwaja Ahsanullah (wife of Nawabzada Ahsanullah, former leader of the BNP, former BNP MP from 1991 to 1996, 1996, & 2001–2006)

Nawabs of Dhanbari and Bogra

- Syed Nawab Ali Chowdhury - Nawab of Dhanbari in Tangail, first Muslim minister of Bengal, co-founder of the University of Dhaka
  - Syed Altaf Ali Chowdhury - Member of the Bengal Legislative Council and the Nawab of Dhanbari & Bogra
  - Syed Hasan Ali Chowdhury - Minister for Commerce and Industry East Pakistan, member of the Bengal Legislative Assembly
    - Syed Mohammad Ali Chowdhury Bogra - President of Pakistan Muslim League, prime minister of Pakistan
      - Hamida Mohammad Ali - spouse of the Prime Minister, and former MNA
    - Syeda Umme Rushaida Ashiqua Chowdhurani - former MP and maternal granddaughter of Ashraf Ali Khan Chowdhury of Natore

Chowdhuries of Chittagong

- Abdul Bari Choudhury of Fatikchari
- Khan Bahadur Abdul Jabbar Chowdhury – married to Begum Fatema Khatun Chowdhury, granddaughter of poet Rahimunnessa
  - A.K.M. Fazlul Quader Chowdhury – eldest son of Abdul Jabbar Chowdhury, former Speaker of Pakistan National Assembly, former acting President of Pakistan, former President of Convention Muslim League
    - Salahuddin Quader Chowdhury – eldest son of Fazlul Quader, former Cabinet Minister, former adviser to the prime minister, Member of BNP standing committee, MP Bangladesh Nationalist Party parliamentarian from Chittagong – 2
      - Humam Quader Chowdhury – son of Salahuddin, Member of Parliament, Member of BNP executive committee
    - Gias Uddin Quader Chowdhury – youngest son of Fazlul Quader, Member of Parliament, vice chairman of Bangladesh Nationalist Party
  - A.K.M. Fazlul Kabir Chowdhury – youngest son of Abdul Jabbar Chowdhury, former opposition leader, Pakistan National Assembly, founding President of Chittagong Chamber of Commerce
    - A.B.M. Fazle Karim Chowdhury - son of Fazlul Kabir, former Member of Parliament, Chairman of the Parliamentary Standing Committee on the ministry of Railways and Australia-Bangladesh Parliamentary association, President of the Committee on the Human Rights of Parliamentarians in the Inter Parliamentary Union, Member of the Parliamentary Standing Committee on the Ministry of Chittagong Hill Tracts, President of Chittagong Awami League (North)
- Salman F Rahman – nephew of Fazlul Quader and Fazlul Kabir, former Member of Parliament, former adviser to the prime minister
- Saber Hossain Chowdhury – nephew of Fazlul Quader and Fazlul Kabir, former Member of Parliament, Chairman of the Parliamentary Standing Committee on the Ministry of Environment, President of the Inter Parliamentary Union, former Deputy Minister, former Political Secretary to the Prime Minister
- Mohammad Abdul Haque – son-in-law of Khan Bahadur Abdul Jabbar Chowdhury, former Member of Parliament, Land Minister, acting president of Janadal Party
- H.N. Ashequr Rahman – grandson-in-law of Khan Bahadur Abdul Jabbar Chowdhury, Former Member of Parliament, Chairman of the Parliamentary Special Committee on Public Accounts, former State Minister

Hamidul Huq Chowdhury – Former Foreign, Finance and Infrastructure Minister of Pakistan, MNA 1937-1946, part of commission of the Radcliffe Plan

Chowdhury Siddikies of Baliadi

- Khan Bahadur Chowdhury Kazemuddin Ahmed Siddiky (Zamindar of Baliadi, co-founder of the University of Dhaka, founder President of the East Bengal and Assam Provincial Muslim League)
- Justice Badruddin Ahmed Siddiky (last Chief Justice of East Pakistan, Permanent Representative of Bangladesh to the United Nations)
- Chowdhury Abraruddin Ahmed Siddiky (former mayor of Dhaka)
- Chowdhury Tanbir Ahmed Siddiky (former Commerce Minister of Bangladesh)

Zaman family of Sitarampur, Gopalganj

- Wahiduzzaman (former Commerce Minister)
- Fayekuzzaman (former member of National Assembly)
- Dr. Wasim Alimuz Zaman (Senior UN Official, Member of the Civil Service of Pakistan and Bangladesh, PhD, Harvard University)
- F.E. Sharfuzzaman Jahangir (former Member of Parliament)

Sarkars of Kuripara, Sirajganj Descended from Haraf Ali Sarkar

- Captain Muhammad Mansur Ali (Prime Minister of Bangladesh 1975)
  - Dr Mohammad Selim (Presidium member of Awami league, Chairman of Foreign affairs standing committee, Member of Bangladesh Parliament 1995–2001)
  - Mohammad Nasim (Minister for Home and Telecommunications 1996–-2001, Member of Bangladesh Parliament 1991–2006) Health Minister and Presidium Member for Awami league 2014
    - Tanvir Shakil Joy, former MP

Syeds of Bir Dampara, Kishoreganj

- Syed Nazrul Islam, former acting President of Bangladesh
  - Sayed Ashraful Islam, former minister of public administration
  - Syed Shafayetul Islam, secretary to the Prime Minister
  - Syeda Zakia Noor Lipi, former MP
- Nephew-in-law: Farhad Hossain former MP and daughter-in-law of Sahiuddin Bishwas

Syeds of Bamna, Barguna Founded by Syed Mir Qadir Bakhsh of Malidia, Faridpur

- Syed Ziaul Ahsan, speaker of the East Bengal Legislative Assembly
- Syed Najmul Ahsan
  - Syed Rahmatur Rob Irtiza Ahsan (1937–2020), MP of Barguna-2
- Syed Qamarul Ahsan, member of the National Assembly of Pakistan
- Relatives: Syeda Sajeda Chowdhury (1935–2022), government minister and granddaughter of Syeda Hamidunnesa of Bamna

Siddiqi Khondakar family Descended from Caliph Abu Bakr

- Shaikh Siraj-ud-Din, qazi-ul-quzzat under Sultan Ghiyasuddin Azam Shah
- Khondakar Ubaidul Akbar, mir munshi of the Nawab of Murshidabad
  - Khandakar Fazle Rabbi (1848–1917), dewan of the Nawab of Murshidabad
- Rehman Sobhan (born 1935), government adviser
  - Zafar Sobhan (born 1970), political analyst
- Farooq Sobhan (born 1940), diplomat and former high commissioner to Malaysia and India

Hashemites of Tetulia, Satkhira Descended from Caliph Ali

- Syed Jalaluddin Hashmey (1894–1947), speaker at the Bengal Legislative Assembly
  - Syed Kamal Bakht Saqi (1930–2000), MP of Satkhira-1
  - Syed Didar Bakht, former state minister of cultural affairs

Suhrawardy family Serniabats of Seral, Barisal Descended from Abdul Khaleq Serniabat

- Abdur Rab Serniabat, former water resources minister and brother-in-law of Sheikh Mujibur Rahman
  - Abul Hasanat Abdullah, five-time MP and Executive Member of Awami League Central Committee
    - Serniabat Sadiq Abdullah, fourth Mayor of Barisal
  - Abul Khair Abdullah, fifth Mayor of Barisal

Chowdhuries of Barokot, Sylhet Descended from Zahur Ali Choudhury

- Ghyasuddin Ahmed Choudhury, district commissioner of Dhaka
  - Faruq Ahmed Choudhury, first chief of protocol
  - Enam Ahmed Chowdhury, former vice-chairman of the Bangladesh Nationalist Party
  - Masum Ahmed Chowdhury, former High Commissioner and diplomat
  - Iftekhar Ahmed Chowdhury, former Minister of Foreign Affairs
- Shamsher Mubeen Chowdhury, former foreign secretary
- Hasan Mashhud Chowdhury, chairman of the Anti-Corruption Commission

Golandaz family of Bagua, Mymensingh Descended from Rustam Ali Golandaz

- Altaf Hossain Golandaz (1947–2007), former MP of Mymensingh-10
  - Fahmi Gulandaz Babel (born 1976), former MP of Mymensingh-10

Khan Taluqdars of Balia, Bhola Founded by Munga Khan

- Naziur Rahman Manzur, former Minister of Local Government and Rural Development and Mayor of Dhaka
  - Andaleeve Rahman Partho, former MP and grandnephew of Sheikh Mujibur Rahman

Khans of Baherchar-Kshudrakathi, Barisal

- Justice Abdul Jabbar Khan, acting President of Pakistan
  - Sadek Khan, political activist
  - Abu Zafar Mohammad Obaidullah Khan, civil servant
  - A.Z.M. Enayetullah Khan, former minister of land, petrol and natural resources
  - Selima Rahman née Khan, former state minister of cultural affairs
  - Rashed Khan Menon, former minister of social welfare, civil aviation and tourism
    - Lutfun Nesa Khan, former MP

Khans of Dardaria, Gazipur

- Tajuddin Ahmad Khan, (first Prime Minister of Bangladesh, 1971)
  - Begum Zohra Tajuddin, (President of the Awami League, 1975–1979)
  - Tanjim Ahmad Sohel Taj, (Minister of State for Home Affairs, 2009)
  - Simeen Hussain Rimi, (MP, 2012–present)
- Afsaruddin Ahmad Khan, former State Minister of Housing and Public Works

Qurayshite Chowdhuries of Daudpur, Sylhet Founded by Shah Daud Qureshi

- Khan Bahadur Gous Uddin Ahmed Chowdhury, member of the Assam Legislative Council
  - Imam Uddin Ahmed Chowdhury, former minister of commerce
  - Shafi Uddin Ahmed Chowdhury MP
  - Emad Uddin Ahmed Chowdhury, first commissioner of Dhaka Metropolitan Police

Chowdhuries of Dayhata-Majidpur, Munshiganj

- Kafiluddin Chowdhury, former MLA
  - A. Q. M. Badruddoza Chowdhury, (President of Bangladesh, 2001–2003; founder of Bikalpa Dhara Bangladesh)
    - Mahi B. Chowdhury, eldest son of Badruddoza Chowdhury; former Member of Parliament, 2003–2006)

Chowdhuries of Natore

- Ashraf Ali Khan Chowdhury, Bengali lawyer and politician.
- Amjad Khan Chowdhury, Bangladeshi Army officer and founder of Bangladesh conglomerate PRAN-RFL Group.
- Abdus Sattar Khan Chowdhury, a Bangladesh Nationalist Party politician and a former member of parliament for Rajshahi-16.

Qazis of Bilbilash, Barisal

- Sher-e-Bangla Abul Kasem Fazlul Huq, (Prime Minister of Bengal and Governor and Chief Minister of East Pakistan)
  - Abul Kalam Faezul Huq, (Cabinet Minister, 1996–2001)

Mahmood Taluqdars of Koyelgati, Sirajganj

- Abdullah al Mahmood (former MLA of British India, 1937; former Deputy High Commissioner, 1947; and former Industrial & Natural Resources Minister of Pakistan, 1964)
  - Iqbal Hassan Mahmood (Member of Parliament 1986–1990, and former State minister for Power of Bangladesh 2001–2006)
- Rumana Mahmood (daughter-in-law of Abdullah al Mahmood; Member of Parliament 2009–2013)
- M.A. Matin (son-in-law of Abdullah al Mahmood, former deputy prime minister of Bangladesh, former Parliament Member 1979–2006, Founder Secretary General of Jatiya Party.)
  - M. A. Muhit (grandson of Abdullah al Mahmood and son of M. A. Matin; Member of Parliament of Sirajganj-6 and state minister.)

Ghani family of Khagakharibari, Nilphamari Descended from Osman Ghani

- Mashiur Rahman, (Former MNA, 1962–1969; Former Deputy Leader of the Opposition of Pakistan, 1962–1964; Former Senior Minister of Bangladesh, with the rank and status of Prime Minister, in charge of the Ministry of Railways, Roads and Highways, 1978–1979)
  - Shawfikul Ghaani Shapan, (son of Mashiur Rahman; Former Member of Parliament, 1979–1988; Former Cabinet Minister, 1984–1988)
    - Jebel Rahman Ghaani (son of Shawfikul Ghaani Shapan; Chairman of Bangladesh National Awami Party, 2009–present)
  - Mansura Mohiuddin (daughter of Mashiur Rahman; Former Member of Parliament, 1986–1991)

Kazis of Bhirich Khan, Munshiganj Descended from Haji Kazi Ershad Ali

- Shaykh-ul-Hadith Kazi Azizul Haque (1919–2012), founder of Bangladesh Khelafat Majlis (BKM) and father-in-law of Nurul Haque Miah
  - Kazi Mahfuzul Haque (born 1969), former general-secretary of BKM
  - Kazi Mamunul Haque (born 1973), general-secretary of BKM

Syeds of Charmonai Founded by Syed Ali Akbar Baghdadi

- Syed Muhammad Ishaq (1915–1977), educationist
  - Syed Fazlul Karim (1935–2006), founder of Islami Shashontantra Andolan
    - Syed Rezaul Karim (born 1971), president of Islami Andolan Bangladesh (IAB) and chairman of Charmonai Union Council
    - Syed Faizul Karim (born 1973), senior vice-president of IAB

Shinepukur family of Dhaka

- Fazlur Rahman (1905–1966), first Education Minister of Pakistan
  - Salman Fazlur Rahman (born 1951), adviser to the Prime Minister

Barashalghar family of Comilla

- Khan Bahadur Maulvi Mafizuddin Ahmad (1891–1979), former Educaition Minister
  - Abu B. Muhammad Ghulam Mostafa (1934–2022), MP for Comilla-4

Darzi family of Sylhet

- Abu Ahmad Abdul Hafiz (1900–1985), Muslim League politician and lawyer. Married to Syeda Shahar Banu
  - Abul Maal Abdul Muhith (1934–2022), former Finance Minister of Bangladesh
  - Abul Kalam Abdul Momen (born 1947), former Foreign Minister of Bangladesh
  - Shahla Khatun, National Professor of Bangladesh

Relatives

Abdul Hamid (1886–1963), former Education Minister of East Bengal

Choudhuries of Balia, Thakurgaon Founded by Zamindar Meher Bakhsh Choudhury

- Nurul Huq Choudhury (1902–1987), parliamentary secretary
- Rezwanul Haque Idu Chowdhury (1930–1994), former Minister of Social Welfare

Choudhuries of Batgram, Comilla Descended from Tofazzal Ahmad Chowdhury Anu Mia

- Ashrafuddin Ahmad Chowdhury (1894–1976), former Education Minister
  - Rabeya Chowdhury, president of Comilla BNP branch

Choudhuries of Bahubal, Habiganj

- Manik Chowdhury (1933–1991), former governor of Habiganj Subdivision
  - Amatul Kibria Keya Chowdhury, politician

Choudhuries of Khanpur, Gopalganj Founded by Rahmat Jan Chowdhury, descendant of the Chowdhuries of Dulai (Pabna)

- Mohabbat Jan Chowdhury, former Home Minister
- Sarwar Jan Chowdhury, politician

Choudhuries of Dargapasha, Sunamganj

- Abdur Rasheed Choudhury (died 1944), businessman, politician and husband of Begum Serajunnessa Choudhury
  - Humayun Rashid Choudhury (1928–2001), 41st President of the United Nations General Assembly
  - Faruk Rashid Chowdhury, former State Minister of Finance

Chowdhuries of Birgoan, Sunamganj Descended from Bir Deb Chowdhury

- Rafikul Bari Chowdhury (1925–1999), Renowned Lawyer and politician
  - Rabeya Bari Chowdhury (1935–2014), Award winning social worker and politician
  - Juned Ahmed Chowdhury (1956–2014), Businessman and social worker
  - Nazmus Sakib Chowdhury (1971–), Nephrologist and politician

Choudhuries of Dhampur, Mymensingh Descended from Khan Sahib Abed Ullah Chowdhury

- Aftab Uddin Chowdhury (1913–1985), politician and diplomat
  - Aman Ullah Chowdhury (died 2014), former MP

Choudhuries of Dhantala, Dinajpur Descended from Maulavi Khurshid Alam Chowdhury

- Abdur Rauf Chowdhury (1937–2007), former State Minister for Post and Telecommunications
  - Khalid Mahmud Chowdhury (born 1970), State Minister of Shipping

Choudhuries of Duttapara, Madaripur

- Ilias Ahmed Chowdhury (1934–1991), politician and first cousin of Sheikh Mujibur Rahman
  - Noor-E-Alam Chowdhury Liton (born 1964), Chief Whip of the Bangladesh Parliament
  - Mujibur Rahman Chowdhury Nixon (born 1978), presidium member of Jubo League and son-in-law of Anwar Hossain Manju

Biswas Choudhury family of Faridpur

- Chowdhury Moyezuddin Biwshash (1840–1923), merchant and aristocrat
  - Chowdhury Abd-Allah Zaheeruddin (1903–1967), former Minister of Health, Labor and Social welfare
  - Yusuf Ali Chowdhury (1905–1971), former Minister of Agriculture
    - Chowdhury Kamal Ibne Yusuf (1940–2020), former Minister of Disaster Management
    - Chowdhury Akmal Ibne Yusuf (1945–2021), former MP

Choudhuries of Guthuma, Feni

- Habibullah Bahar Chowdhury (1906–1966), former Health Minister and husband of Anwara Bahar Chowdhury
  - Parveen Sultana Chaudhury (1940–2004), writer and academician
  - Iqbal Bahar Chowdhury (born 1940), news presenter and elocutionist
- Begum Shamsunnahar Chowdhurani (1908—1964), writer, educator, MP and mother of Mamun Mahmud

Choudhuries of Ramnagar, Feni Descend from Baro-Bhuyans who setteled as Faujdars in 1672

- Hamidul Huq Chowdhury (1901–1992), 4th Minister of Foreign Affairs (East Pakistan)
- Saber Hossain Chowdhury (born 1961), Minister of Environment, Forest and Climate Change
- Zahur Hossain Chowdhury (1922-1980), Prominent Journalist, editor of Daily Sangbad, Ekushey Padak Receipient
- Hedayet Hossain Chowdhury (1930-2014), Founder of Karnaphuli Group, Father of Saber Hossain Chowdhury
- Sayeed Hossain Chowdhury (1957-2025), Founder of HRC Group, Chairman of One Bank PLC, son of Hedayet Hossain Chowdhury
- Rahimullah Chowdhury Member of 4th National Assembly of Pakistan
- Superman
- Markiplier

Choudhuries of Haildhar, Chittagong

- Akhtaruzzaman Chowdhury Babu (1945–2012), founding chairman of United Commercial Bank PLC
  - Saifuzzaman Chowdhury (born 1969), Minister of Land

Shiqdar Choudhuries of Mandalpara, Cox's Bazar

- Osman Sarwar Alam Chowdhury (1937–2010), former ambassador to the UAE and member of Legislative Assembly
- Shaimum Sarwar Chowdhury Kamal (born 1970), politician

Chowdhuries of Monakosha, Nawabganj Founded by Ismail Hossain Choudhry of Kotalpukur

- Murtaza Raza Choudhry, former State Minister for Finance and relative of Choudhury family of Gahira (Chittagong)
  - Mainur Reza Chowdhury (1938–2004), 12th Chief Justice of Bangladesh, husband of Najma Chowdhury of Habiganj
- Zara Jabeen Chowdhurani (born 1976), former MP and wife of Naveed Mahbub

Chowdhuries of Nagbari, Tangail

- Khan Bahadur Abdul Hamid Chowdhury (died 1969), Speaker of the East Pakistan Provincial Assembly
  - Abu Sayeed Chowdhury (1921–1987), second President of Bangladesh
    - Abul Hasan Chowdhury Qaisar (born 1951), former State Minister of Foreign Affairs

Khan Chowdhuries of Nandail, Mymensingh

- Anwarul Hossain Khan Chowdhury (died 2013), former adviser to the president, brother-in-law of ASHK Sadek and relative of Chowdhuries of Shat Aani, Bogra
- Khurram Khan Chowdhury (1945–2021), founding member of Bangladesh Nationalist Party, President of BNP Mymensingh (North), former member of Dhaka University Senate and relative of Choudhury family of Gahira (Chittagong)

Chowdhuries of Shat Aani, Bogra

- Ismat Ara Chowdhury (1941–2020), former State Minister of Public Administration and wife of ASHK Sadek
- Mamdudur Rahman Chowdhury (1946–2018), former Minister of Shipping

Chowdhuries of Ranakeli, Sylhet

- Abdul Ghafur Chowdhury, headmaster of Sylhet Government Pilot High School
  - Mahmudul Amin Choudhury (1937–2019), 11th Chief Justice of Bangladesh
- Abdul Hamid Chowdhury [Hamdu Miah]
  - Bir Bikrom Yamin Chowdhury
  - Fatema Chowdhury Paru (1944–2002), former MP

Kazis of Tungipara, Gopalganj

- Qazi Abu Yusuf, physician and politician
- Kazi Zafarullah (born 1947), politician and husband of MP Nilufer Zafarullah
- Kazi Shahidullah, chairman of University Grants Commission

Kazis of Cheora, Comilla

- Kazi Mukarram Ali, lawyer at Comilla Judge Court
  - Nawab Kazi Musharraf Hussain (1871–1966), lawyer and philanthropist
- Kazi Zahirul Qayyum, former MP
  - Kazi Zafar Ahmed (1939–2015), former Prime Minister of Bangladesh

Kazis of Nilphamari

- Kazi Abdul Kader (1914–2002), Food & Agriculture Minister, former MP, grandson-in-law of Nawab Khwaja Salimullah
  - Kazi Faruque Kader, politician

Bishwas family of Shayestabad, Barisal

- Abdur Rahman Biswas (1926–2017), former president of Bangladesh, husband of Hosne Ara Rahman and cousin-in-law of Rashed Khan Menon
- Ehteshamul Haq Nasim Biswas (died 1998), medical doctor and MP

Bishwas family of Lalbazar, Meherpur Descended from Muhammad Yaqub Bishwas

- Mohammad Sahiuddin Bishwas (1923–1990), freedom fighter and MP
  - Farhad Hossain Bishwas Dodul (born 1972), Minister of Public Administration

Khandakers of Faridpur Descended from Khandaker Abdul Barik

- Khandaker Nurul Islam (died 2001), first MP of Faridpur-2 and first cousin of Sheikh Mujibur Rahman
  - Khandaker Mosharraf Hossain (born 1942), former Minister of Labour

Khondkars of Kodalia, Faridpur Descended from Khondkar Moazzem Hossain

- Khondkar Nazmul Huda (1938–1975), army colonel
  - Naheed Ezaher Khondkar, member of parliament

Khandakers of Naruchi, Tangail

- Khandaker Asaduzzaman (1935–2020), first finance secretary of Bangladesh
  - Khandaker Aparajita Haque (born 1964), member of parliament

Islams of Comilla Descended from M.A Mannan

- M.A Mannan, Chairmain of Muradnagar Upazila
  - Md. Monirul Islam, Businessman
  - Md. Farooque, Businessman

Syeds of Talibpur Descended from Caliph Ali

- Syed Badrudduja (1900–1974), Mayor of Calcutta
  - Syeda Sakina Islam (1928–2008), former MP
  - Syeda Razia Faiz (1936–2013), first female member of Bangladeshi parliament

== Barbados ==
The Adams family (father-son)

- Sir Grantley Herbert Adams (Premier of Barbados, 1954–1958)
  - Tom Adams (Prime Minister of Barbados, 1976–1985)

The Barrow family (brother-sister)

- Errol Barrow (Prime Minister of Barbados, 1961–1976 and 1986–1987)
- Dame Nita Barrow (Governor-General of Barbados, 1990–1995)

== Belgium ==
Anciaux family (father and sons)

- Vic Anciaux (1931–2023) (VU party leader, Brussels State Secretary)
  - Jan Anciaux (1958–) N-VA (Schepen in Vilvoorde)
  - Bert Anciaux (1959–) sp.a (VU party leader, Flemish Minister, Belgian Senator)
  - Koen Anciaux (1961–) Open Vld (Schepen in Mechelen)
  - Roel Anciaux (1971–) sp.a (member of Flemish Brabant Provincial Council)

de Brouckère brothers

- Henri de Brouckère (1801–91) (Prime Minister of Belgium)
- Charles de Brouckère (1796–1860) (Minister of Finance, Interior and War)

De Croo family (father-son)

- Herman De Croo (1937–) Open Vld (Minister, Speaker of the Chamber, Minister of State)
  - Alexander De Croo (1975–) Open Vld (VLD party leader; Deputy PM and Minister of Pensions, Prime Minister of Belgium 2020-incumbent)

De Gucht family (father-son)

- Karel De Gucht (1954–) Open Vld (Minister of Foreign Affairs, European Commissioner)
  - Frédéric De Gucht (1981–) Anders (Leader of Anders)
  - Jean-Jacques De Gucht (1983–) Open Vld (Senator)

Dehousse family (father-son)

- Fernand Dehousse (1906–76) (Minister of Education)
  - Jean-Maurice Dehousse (1936–2023) (Minister-President of Wallonia)

Eyskens family (father-son)

- Gaston Eyskens (1905–88) CVP (Prime Minister of Belgium)
  - Mark Eyskens (1933–) CD&V (Prime Minister of Belgium)

Spaak family

- Paul Janson (1840–1913) Lib. (Senator)
  - Paul-Emile Janson (1872–1944) Lib. (Prime Minister of Belgium, son of Paul Janson)
  - Marie Janson (1873–1960) PSB (Senator; daughter of Paul Janson)
    - Paul-Henri Spaak (1899–1972) PSB (Prime Minister of Belgium, Secretary General of NATO; son of Marie Janson)
      - Antoinette Spaak (1928–2020) FDF (Member of the European Parliament; daughter of Paul-Henri Spaak)

Simonet family (father-son)

- Henri Simonet (1931–96) PS (Minister of Economy and Foreign Affairs)
  - Jacques Simonet (1963–2007) MR (Minister-President of the Brussels-Capital Region)
    - Eléonore Simonet (1997–) MR (Minister of the Middle class, Self-Employed and SMEs)

Vanderpoorten family

- Arthur Vanderpoorten (1884–1945) Lib. (Minister of Interior)
  - Herman Vanderpoorten (1922–84) PVV (Minister of Interior and Justice; son of Arthur Vanderpoorten)
    - Marleen Vanderpoorten (1954–;) Open Vld (Minister of Education, Speaker of the Flemish Parliament; daughter of Herman Vanderpoorten)
    - Patrick Dewael (1955–;) Open Vld (Minister-President of Flanders, President of the Chamber of Representatives; nephew of Herman Vanderpoorten)

Van Rompuy family

- Herman Van Rompuy (1947–;) CD&V (President of the Chamber of Representatives, Prime Minister, President of the European Council)
  - Peter Van Rompuy (1980–;) CD&V (Senator, son of Herman Van Rompuy)
- Eric Van Rompuy (1949–;) CD&V (Minister of Agriculture and Economy, brother of Herman Van Rompuy)

== Benin ==
The Soglo family

- Christophe Soglo (President of Benin, 1963–64 and 1965–67)
  - Nicéphore Soglo (nephew; President of Benin, 1991–96)
  - Saturnin Soglo (brother of Nicéphore Soglo; Foreign Minister)

The Zinsou family

- Émile Derlin Zinsou (President of Benin, formerly Dahomey, 1968–69)
  - Lionel Zinsou (nephew; Prime Minister of Benin, 2015–2016)

== Bhutan ==
Dorji family

- Sonam Topgay Dorji (Chief Minister of Bhutan, 1917–52)
  - Jigme Palden Dorji (Prime Minister of Bhutan, 1952–64; son of Sonam Topgay Dorji)
  - Lhendup Dorji (Prime Minister of Bhutan, 1964; son of Sonam Topgay Dorji)

== Bolivia ==
The Ballivián family (father-son)

- José Ballivián (1805–1852) (President of Bolivia, 1841–47)
  - Adolfo Ballivián (1831–1874) (President of Bolivia, 1873–74)

The Fernandez Saucedo family

- Max Jhonny Fernandez Saucedo (1964-) (Mayor of Santa Cruz de la Sierra, 1996–2002 and 2021–present)
  - Paola Andrea Fernandez Rea (1992-) (Senator for Santa Cruz, 2020–present; daughter of Jhonny Fernandez Saucedo)
- Roberto Fernandez Saucedo (1968-) (Deputy for Santa Cruz, 1997–1998; Mayor of Santa Cruz de la Sierra, 2002–05)

The Morales Ayma family

- Juan Evo Morales Ayma (1959-) (President of Bolivia, 2006–2019)
- Esther Morales Ayma de Wilcarani (1949–2020) (First Lady of Bolivia, 2006–2019)
  - Adhemar Wilcarani Morales (1978-) (Mayor of Oruro, 2021–present; son of Esther Morales Ayma)

The Paz family

- Luis Paz Arce (1854–1928) (President of the Supreme Court of Bolivia, 1926–30)
  - (1910–1984) (Bolivian Army General; son of Luis Paz Arce)
    - Jaime Paz Zamora (1939-) (President of Bolivia, 1989–93; son of Domingo Paz Rojas)
      - Jaime Paz Pereira (?-) (Deputy for Tarija, 2002–05; son of Jaime Paz Zamora)
      - Rodrigo Paz (1967-) (President of Bolivia, 2025-present), Senator for Tarija, 2020–2025; Mayor of Tarija, 2015–2020; son of Jaime Paz Zamora)
- Domingo Paz Arce (1855–1910) (Prefect and Commander General of Tarija, 1892–96)
  - Domingo Paz Rojas (1879–1930) (Senator for Tarija; son of Domingo Paz Arce)
    - Ángel Victor Paz Estenssoro (1907–2001) President of Bolivia, 1952–56, 1960–64 and 1985–89; son of Domingo Paz Rojas)
      - Moira Paz Estenssoro Cortez (1957-) (Minister of Sustainable Development, 2003; Senator for Tarija, 2002; Ambassador of Bolívia in Italy, (1993-1997 2004-2005); Daughter of Victor Paz Estenssoro)

The Siles family

- Hernando Siles Reyes (1882–1942) (President of Bolivia, 1926–30)
  - Hernán Siles Zuazo (1914–1996) (President of Bolivia, 1950–60 and 1982–85; son of Hernando Siles Reyes)
  - Luis Adolfo Siles Salinas (1925–2005) (President of Bolivia, 1969; son of Hernando Siles Reyes)

== Bosnia and Herzegovina ==
The Izetbegović family (husband-wife-son)

- Bakir Izetbegović (member of the Presidency of Bosnia and Herzegovina, 2010–2018)
- Alija Izetbegović (first president of the Presidency of Bosnia and Herzegovina 1990–2000)

The Pozderac family

- Agha Murat Pozderac (1862–1930), was the last leader of Cazin, Bosnia and Herzegovina during Ottoman rule.
  - Nurija Pozderac (1892–1943), son of Murat, member of Kingdom of Yugoslavia Parliament, Vice President of the executive board of the Anti-Fascist Council of National Liberation of Yugoslavia.
    - Hakija Pozderac (1919–1994), son of Nurija Pozderac, Yugoslav politician: Republic Prosecutor for War Crimes committed in Districts Banja Luka and Bihać (Jan. 1947–1948), National Representative of Cazin to Republic Parliament (1948–1949), General Secretary of the Government of Bosnia and Herzegovina (1949–1952), State Secretary for Economic Relations of National Republic of BiH (1953–1954), Head of State Secretariat for Budgeting and Economy of National Republic of BiH (1954–1956), Director of BiH National Bank (1956–1960), Head of Economic Relations Department in National Republic of BiH (1960–1962), Federal Secretary for Economy (1962–1965), Federal Secretary for Industry and Trade (1965–1967), Representative in Federal Executive Council (1967–1971), Representative in Federal Assembly of Yugoslavia (1971–1982), Representative in the Council of Federation (1982–1983).
    - Hamdija Pozderac (1924–1988), nephew of Nurija Pozderac. communist politician and the president of Bosnia and Herzegovina from 1971 to 1974. He was a vice president of the former Yugoslavia in the late 1980s, and was in line to become the president of Yugoslavia just before he was forced to resign from politics in 1987.
- Vuk Jeremić (born 1975), Serbian politician, Minister of Foreign Affairs of Serbia from 2007 until 2012. President of the 67th session of the United Nations General Assembly between September 2012 and September 2013. Great-grandson of Nurija Pozderac.
- Hamdija Lipovača (born 1976), Bosnian politician: Prime Minister of Una-Sana Canton (2011–2015), Minister of the Interior (2013–2014), Mayor of Bihać (2004–2010), Member of the House of Representatives of Bosnia and Herzegovina (2010–2014). Great-grandson of Nurija Pozderac.

== Botswana ==
The Khama family (husband-wife-son)

- Sir Seretse Khama (President, 1966–80)
- Ruth Williams Khama (politically active First Lady)
  - Ian Khama (President, 2008–18)

== Brunei ==
The Abidin family

- Abidin, 1st Deputy Minister of Home Affairs
  - Aminuddin Ihsan, 7th Minister of Culture, Youth and Sports

The Apong family

- Umar, Commissioner of Police
- Ibnu Basit, 1st Deputy Minister of Defence

The Bakar family

- Abdullah, 5th Minister of Communications
- Yahya, 3rd Minister of Industry and Primary Resources
- Abdul Rahman, permanent secretary at the Ministry of Defence

The Ibrahim family

- Ibrahim, 1st Menteri Besar (Chief Minister) of Brunei
  - Abbas Al-Sufri, member of the Privy Council of Brunei
  - Isa, Special Adviser to the Sultan of Brunei and Minister at the Prime Minister's Office
    - Ahmad, 8th Attorney General of Brunei

The Umar family

- Umar, a member of manteri
  - Abdul Aziz, 1st Minister of Education
  - Jamil Al-Sufri, member of Legislative Council of Brunei
    - Normah Suria Hayati, permanent secretary at the Ministry of Industry and Primary Resources

The Taib family

- Taib, State Secretary of Brunei
  - Abdul Rahman, 8th Speaker of Legislative Council

The Yassin family

- Muhammad Yassin, member of wazir
  - Kemaluddin Al-Haj, 6th Speaker of Legislative Council
    - Abdul Rahim, prince consort and member of cheteria

The Yunos family

- Mohamed Rozan, permanent secretary at the Prime Minister's Office
- Mohamed Riza, Deputy Minister at the Prime Minister's Office

== Bulgaria ==
The Bogoridi family

- Sophronius of Vratsa (one of the leading figures of the Bulgarian National Revival)
- Stefan Bogoridi (Governor of the island of Samos, Caimacam of Moldavia)
- Nicola Bogoridi (Caimacam of Moldavia)
- Alexander Bogoridi (Governor-General of Eastern Rumelia)
- Emanuil Bogoridi (member of the Chamber of Deputies of Romania)

The Bokov family

- Georgi Bokov (former Communist leader, former media boss)
- Filip Bokov (former Socialist leader, Member of Parliament, Presidential advisor)
  - Georgi Bokov (1972–2001), son of Filip Bokov, auto thief and criminal,
  - Biliana Bokova (d. 2001), daughter of Filip Bokov
- Irina Bokova (former Foreign Minister, ran for vice-president, Member of Parliament, Ambassador to France)

The Mihaylovski family

- Ilarion Makariopolski (one of the leaders of the struggle for an autonomous Bulgarian church)
- Nikola Mihaylovski (one of the leaders of the struggle for an autonomous Bulgarian church)
- Stoyan Mihaylovski (Member of Parliament)
- Hristo Mihaylovski (former Deputy Minister)

The Shishmanov family

- Alexander Shishmanov (Mayor of Svishtov)
- Asen Shishmanov (Member of Parliament)
- Ivan Shishmanov (former Minister, Ambassador to Ukraine)
- Dimitar Shishmanov (former Foreign Minister)

The Slaveykov family

- Petko Slaveykov (Chairman of the Parliament)
- Ivan Slaveykov (Member of Parliament, Minister, Mayor of Sofia)
- Hristo Slaveykov (Chairman of the Parliament)

The Staliyski family

- Aleksandar Tsankov Staliyski (former Justice Minister)
- Aleksandar Aleksandrov Staliyski (former Defence Minister)

The Stanishev family (father-son)

- Dimitar Stanishev (member of the Politburo of the Bulgarian Communist Party)
  - Sergei Stanishev (Prime Minister of Bulgaria, 2005–09)

The Zhivkov family

- Todor Zhivkov (General Secretary of the Bulgarian Communist Party, 1954–89)
  - Lyudmila Zhivkova (former Culture minister; daughter of Todor Zhivkov)
    - Jenny Zhivkova (Member of Parliament; granddaughter of Todor Zhivkov)

== Burkina Faso ==
The Compaoré family

- Blaise Compaoré (President of Burkina Faso, 1987–2014)
- François Compaoré (economic advisor; brother of Blaise Compaoré)
- Simon Compaoré (Mayor of Ouagadougou)
- Jean-Marie Compaoré (Archbishop of Burkina Faso)
- Jean-Baptiste Compaoré (Finance minister)
- Franck Compaoré
- Chantal Compaoré (First Lady; wife of Blaise Compaoré)
- Félix Houphouët-Boigny (former president of Côte d'Ivoire; father of Chantal Compaoré)

The Sankara family

- Thomas Isidore Noël Sankara (First President of Burkina Faso, 1983–1987)
- Mariam Sankara (First Lady; wife of Thomas Isidore Noël Sankara)

The Yaméogo family (father-son)

- Maurice Yaméogo (President of Upper Volta Burkina Faso, 1959–66)
  - Hermann Yaméogo (Presidential candidate)

The Zerbo-Yonli family

- Saye Zerbo (President of Upper Volta Burkina Faso, 1980–82)
  - Paramanga Ernest Yonli (Prime Minister of Upper Volta Burkina Faso, 2000–07; son-in-law)

== Burma ==
The Aung San family (parents-daughter)

- Aung San (pre-independence prime minister)
- Khin Kyi (ambassador)
  - Aung San Suu Kyi (democracy activist, Minister of Foreign Affairs, State of Counsellor)

The Win family (father-daughter)

- Ne Win, military dictator
  - Sandar Win, politician

== Burundi ==
The Bagaza-Buyoya family

- Jean-Baptiste Bagaza (President, 1976–87)
- Pierre Buyoya (President, 1987–93 and 1996–2003)

== Cambodia ==
The Hun family

- Hun Sen, Prime Minister of Cambodia (1985–2023, including as Second Prime Minister in 1993–2023)
  - Hun Manet, Prime Minister of Cambodia (since 2023), Lieutenant-general in the Royal Cambodian Armed Forces
  - Hun Manith, Brigadier-general in the Royal Cambodian Armed Forces
  - Hun Many, Member of Parliament for Kampong Speu Province

The Saloth family

- Pol Pot, Supreme Leader of Democratic Kampuchea
- Ieng Sary, Deputy Prime Minister of Democratic Kampuchea, brother-in-law of Pol Pot

== Central African Republic ==
The Boganda family–Dacko family–Domitien family and Bokassa family (distant relatives)

- Barthélemy Boganda, "founding father"
- Clément Hassen, Secretary for the president of the Republic and father of Marie-Reine Hassen
- David Dacko, first leader of independent CAR
- Elisabeth Domitien, prime minister and cousin of Bokassa
- Jean-Bédel Bokassa, Cold War-era despot and erstwhile "emperor"
- Jean-Serge Bokassa, Minister of Youth, Sports, Arts, and Culture (2011–13), Minister of the Interior (2016–2018)
- Marie-Reine Hassen, Central African Goodwill Ambassador to Senegal (2003–2006), Minister Delegate for Foreign Affairs (2006–2007), Minister Delegate for the Economy, Planning and International Cooperation (2007–2008), Minister Delegate for Regional Development (2008–2009) and forcefully married to Bokassa
- Marthe Matongo, Member of the National Assembly and cousin of first lady Florence Yagbao (first wife of Dacko)

The Bozizé family

- François Bozizé (President of the Central African Republic, 2003–2013)
  - Monique Bozizé (wife of François Bozizé; Member of Parliament)
  - Jean-Francis Bozizé (son of François Bozizé; Minister Delegate for National Defense (until 2013))
  - Sylvain Ndoutingai (nephew of François Bozizé; Minister of Finance and Budet (2011–2012), Minister of State of Mines, Energy, and Water Resources (2003–2011))

The Kolingba family

- André Kolingba (President of the Central African Republic, 1981–93)
  - Désiré Kolingba (presidential candidate)
- Mireille Kolingba (wife of André Kolingba; Member of Parliament)

== Chad ==
The Itno–Djérou–Erdimi family

- Idriss Déby, president of Chad
  - Hinda Déby Itno, First Lady and wife of Idriss
  - Zina Wazouna Ahmed Idriss, wife of Idriss
  - Hadja Halimé, wife of Idriss
  - Amani Musa Hila, wife of Idriss
    - Musa Hilal, father of Amani and leader of the Janjaweed militia in Sudan
  - Mahamat Déby, president of Chad and son of Idriss
    - Dahabaya Oumar Souni, First Lady and wife of Mahamat
    - Abakar Sabone, Central African rebel leaderand government minister and father-in-law of Mahamat
    - Yaya Dillo Djérou, leader of the PSF and nephew of Mahamat
  - Brahim Déby, son of Idriss
- Saleh Déby Itno, brother of Idriss
- Timane Erdimi, rebel leader and nephew of Idriss
- Tom Erdimi, rebel leader and twin brother of Timane

== Chile ==
The Alessandri family

- Jose Pedro Alessandri Palma Senator
  - Gustavo Alessandri Valdés four times Deputy, Mayor of Santiago and La Florida, council man.
  - Gustavo Alessandri Balmaceda Deputy 1990–94
  - Gustavo Alessandri Bascuñan Councilman 2012–16, Mayor of Zapallar 2016–
  - Felipe Alessandri Vergara Councilman 2004–08, 2012–16, Mayor of Santiago 2016–
- Arturo Alessandri Palma, President of Chile, 1920–24, 1925, 1932–38
  - Jorge Alessandri, President of Chile, 1958–64
  - Fernando Alessandri, President of the Senate of Chile, 1950–58
  - Arturo Alessandri Besa Deputy, Senator

The Allende family

- Salvador Allende Gossens, President of Chile 1970–73
  - Isabel Allende Bussi, Deputy 1993–2007, Senator 2010–
  - Maya Fernández Allende Deputy 2018–22, Minister of Defense 2022–
- Laura Allende Gossens, Deputy 1965–73

The Aylwin family

- Patricio Aylwin – President of Chile, 1990–94
  - Mariana Aylwin – Minister of Education, 2000–03

The Errázuriz family

- Federico Errázuriz Zañartu, President of Chile
- Federico Errázuriz Echaurren, President of Chile
- Francisco Javier Errázuriz Talavera, Senator 1994–2002
- Hernán Felipe Errázuriz Correa, Foreign Minister of Chile

The Frei family

- Eduardo Frei Montalva – President of Chile, 1964–70
  - Eduardo Frei Ruiz-Tagle – President of Chile, 1994–2000 (son of Eduardo Frei Montalva)
  - Carmen Frei Ruiz-Tagle – Senator, 1990–2006
- Arturo Frei Bolivar – Deputy, 1969–73, Senator, 1989–98

The Girardi family

- Treviso Girardi – Mayor of Quinta Normal
  - Guido Girardi Brière – Deputy, 2006–2010
    - Guido Girardi – Deputy 1994–2006, Senator 2006–present
    - Cristina Girardi – Mayor of Cerro Navia, 1996–2008, Deputy 2010–present
    - Dino Girardi – Councillor of Lo Prado

The Kast family

- José Antonio Kast, Deputy 2002–2018, Leader of the Republican Party
- Miguel Kast, Head of the National Office of Planification 1978–1980, Minister of Labor 1980–1982
  - Felipe Kast, Minister of Planning 2010–11, President of Evópoli 2015–16
  - Pablo Kast, Deputy 2018–present

The Lagos family

- Ricardo Lagos Escobar, President of Chile, 2000–06
  - Ricardo Lagos Weber, Minister Secretary General of Government of Chile, 2006–07

The Letelier family

- Orlando Letelier del Solar, Minister of Foreign Affairs, Interior and Defence, 1973
  - Juan Pablo Letelier, Deputy 1990–2006, Senator 2006–07

The Montt family

- Manuel Montt Torres, President of Chile
- Jorge Montt Alvarez, President of Chile
- Pedro Montt Montt, President of Chile

The Piñera family

- Sebastián Piñera, President of Chile
- José Piñera, Minister of Labor and Social Security, minister of Mining
- Pablo Piñera, Chilean ambassador to Argentina
- Andrés Chadwick, Minister of Interior and Public Security

The Pinochet family

- Augusto Pinochet, President of Chile
- Lucía Pinochet, Congresswoman of Vitacura

The Pinto family

- Francisco Antonio Pinto Díaz, President of Chile
- Aníbal Pinto Garmendia, President of Chile

== Republic of China (Taiwan) ==
The Chang family of Yunlin

- Chang Jung-wei (Yunlin County Magistrate, 1999–2005)
  - Chang Chia-chun (legislator, 2008–2016) (daughter)
- Chang Li-shan (legislator, 2005–2008, 2016–2018; Yunlin County Magistrate, 2018–) (sister)

The Chang family of New Taipei

- Chang Ching-chung (member of the National Assembly 1992–95, Legislative Yuan 2005–16)
- Chen Ching-ting (member of the Taipei County Council 1994–2010, and New Taipei City Council 2010–) (wife)
  - Chang Chih-lun (member of the Legislative Yuan 2024–) (son)

The Chiang family (father-sons-grandson-great-grandson)

- Chiang Kai-shek (President of the Republic of China, 1928–32; 1943–49; 1950–75; Premier of the Republic of China, 1930–31; 1935–38; 1939–45; 1947; Leader of the Kuomintang, 1926–75)
  - Chiang Ching-kuo (Premier of the Republic of China, 1972–78; President of the Republic of China, 1978–88; Chairman of the Kuomintang, 1975–88)
    - Chiang Hsiao-wu (ROC Representative to Japan, 1990–91)
    - Chiang Hsiao-yung (former member of the Kuomintang Central Committee)
    - John Chiang (foreign minister, 1996–97; vice premier of the ROC, 1997; secretary-general; legislator, 2002–2012)
      - Chiang Wan-an (legislator, 2016–2022; Mayor of Taipei, 2022–)
  - Chiang Wei-kuo (Secretary-General of Kuomintang)

The Chen family (Chen Hsin-an) (father-son)

- Chen Hsin-an Kaohsiung County magistrate (1954–57)
  - Chen Chien-jen (son): Minister of the Department of Health (2003–05), Minister of the National Science Council (2006–08), Vice President of the Republic of China (2016–20)

The Chen family (Chen Qimei)

- Chen Qimei
  - Chen Guofu (nephew)
  - Chen Lifu (nephew)

The Chen family (Chen Shui-bian)

- Chen Shui-bian: Member of Taipei City Council (1981–85); Legislative Yuan member (1990–94); Mayor of Taipei (1994–98); President of the Republic of China (2000–08)
- Wu Shu-chen (wife): Legislative Yuan member (1987–90)
  - Chen Chih-chung (son): Kaohsiung city councilor (2010–11, 2018–)

The Chiu family (Chiou Lien-hui)

- Chiou Lien-hui: Pingtung County Councilor (1968–71), Taiwan Provincial Councilor (1973–81), Pingtung County Magistrate (1981–85), member of the Legislative Yuan (1987–1996)
  - Chiu Tzu-cheng (son): National Assembly member
  - Chiu Feng-kuang (nephew): Director of the National Immigration Agency (2018–2021)
  - Lee Shih-pin: Pingtung county councillor (2002-)

The Chiu family (Chiu Ching-te)

- Chiu Ching-te: Pingtung County Assemblyman and Mayor of Pingtung City
  - Chiu Mao-nan (son): Pingtung County Councilor (1968–77) Taiwan Provincial Councilor (1989–98)
    - Chiu Yi-ying (granddaughter): Member of the National Assembly (1996–2000), Legislative Yuan (2002–05; 2008–)
    - Lee Yung-te (husband of Chiu Yi-ying): Minister of the Hakka Affairs Council (2005–08; 2016–)
    - Chiu Ming-chang (grandson): Pingtung County Councilor (2006–14)

The Chou family

- Chou Wu-liu: Legislative Yuan member (1999–2002)
- Chou Chen Hsiu-hsia: Legislative Yuan member (2016–20)

The Fu family

- Fu Kun-chi: Legislative Yuan member (2002–09; 2020–); Hualien County magistrate (2009–2018)
- Hsu Chen-wei: Hualien County magistrate (2018–)

The Hau family

- Hau Pei-tsun: Commander-in-Chief of the Republic of China Army (1978–81); Chief of the General Staff of the Republic of China Armed Forces (1981–89); Ministry of National Defense (1989–90); Premier (1990–93)
  - Hau Lung-pin (son): Legislative Yuan member (1996–2001); Minister of the Environmental Protection Administration of the Executive Yuan (2001–03); Mayor of Taipei (2006–14); Vice Chairman of Kuomintang (2014–)

The Hsu family (mother–daughters of Chiayi)

- Hsu Shih-hsien: Taiwan Provincial councilor (1957–68); Legislative Yuan member (1973–81); Mayor of Chiayi City (1968–72, 1982–83)
  - Chang Wen-ying (daughter): National Assembly member (1987–93); Mayor of Chiayi City (1989–97)
  - Chang Po-ya (daughter): Mayor of Chiayi City (1983–89, 1997–2000); Minister of the Department of Health (1990–97); Legislative Yuan member (1990); Minister of the Interior (2000–02); chairwoman, Taiwan Provincial Government (2000–02); President of the Control Yuan (2014–2020)

The Hsu family (brothers of Taoyuan)

- Hsu Hsin-liang, Taoyuan County Magistrate (1977–79)
  - Hsu Chung Pi-hsia (wife), member of the Legislative Yuan (1999–2002)
- Hsu Kuo-tai, member of the Legislative Yuan (1987–1996)

The Hsu–Wu family

- Hsu Sheng-fa, (father-in-law of Eugene Wu) member of the Legislative Yuan (1981–1990)
- Eric Wu (brother of Eugene Wu) member of the Legislative Yuan (1993–1996; 2002–2005), member of the National Assembly (1996–2000)
  - Cynthia Wu (daughter of Eugene Wu) member of the Legislative Yuan (2022–2024)

The Huang family

- Huang Hsin-chieh Legislative Yuan member (1969–91)
- Huang Tien-fu (brother): Legislative Yuan member (1981–84; 96–99)
- Lan Mei-chin (sister-in-law): Taipei City Councilor (1985–2002) Legislative Yuan member (2002–08)

The Huang–Liao family (siblings)

- Huang Hsien-chou Legislative Yuan member (1999–2002)
- Huang Hsin-hui Taichung County Councilor (1998–2010), Taichung City Councilor (2010–)
  - Sean Liao (son of Huang Hsin-hui) Legislative Yuan member (2024–)

The Kao family

- Kao Tsu-min, member of the Legislative Yuan (1990–1993)
- Yang Fu-mei (wife), member of the Legislative Yuan (2002–2005)

The Ku family (brothers)

- Ku Cheng-lun: military leadership
- Ku Cheng-kang: Minister of the Interior (1950)
- Ku Cheng-ting: Legislative Yuan member (elected 1948)
- Pi Yi-shu (wife of Ku Cheng-ting): Legislative Yuan member (elected 1948)

The Lee family (Lee Huan)

- Lee Huan Premier of the Republic of China (1989–90)
  - Lee Ching-hua (son): Member of the Legislative Yuan (1993–2016)
  - Diane Lee (daughter): Member of the Legislative Yuan (1999–2009)

The Lee-Han family

- Lee Jih-kuei: Yunlin County Councilor (1985–1997)
  - Lee Chia-fen (daughter): Yunlin County Councilor (1997–2009)
  - Han Kuo-yu (son-in-law): Taipei County Councilor (1990–93) Legislative Yuan member (1993–2002) Mayor of Kaohsiung (2018–2020)
  - Lee Ming-che (son): Yunlin County Councilor (2009–)

The Lien family

- Lien Chen-tung: Acting Taipei County magistrate (1946–47); National Assembly member (1947–86); Taiwan Provincial Government secretary general (1957); Minister of the Interior (1960–66)
  - Lien Chan (son): Minister of Transportation and Communications (1981–87); Minister of Foreign Affairs (1988–90); Vice Premier (1987–88); chairman, Taiwan Provincial Government (1990–93); Premier (1993–97); Vice President (1996–2000); chairman, Kuomintang (2000–05)
    - Sean Lien (grandson): Candidate for Mayor of Taipei

Ni–Kuo-Liu family

- Ni Wen-ya, Member of the National Assembly (1946–1948), Legislative Yuan (1948–1991) Vice President of the Legislative Yuan (1961–1972), President of the Legislative Yuan (1972–1988)
- Shirley Kuo (wife), Minister of Finance (1988–1990) and the Council for Economic Planning and Development (1990–1993)
  - Christina Liu (biological daughter of Kuo), member of the Legislative Yuan (2002–2007), minister of the Council for Economic Planning and Development (2010–2012) and Finance (2012)

The Soong family (father-son-3 daughters)

- Charlie Soong: anti-Qing dynasty activist; financier of Sun Yat-sen
  - T. V. Soong: Governor of the Bank of China; Minister of Finance; Minister of Foreign Affairs; legislator; Premier
  - Soong Ai-ling (a.k.a. Madame H. H. Kung): secretary to President Sun Yat-sen
  - Soong Ching-ling (a.k.a. Madame Sun Yat-sen): Vice President of China; Honorary President of China
  - Soong Mei-ling (a.k.a. Madame Chiang Kai-shek): legislator, Cabinet Minister (Air Force)

The Su family (Su Jia-chyuan)

- Su Jia-chyuan: Pingtung County magistrate (1997–2004); Minister of the Interior (2004–06); Minister of the Council of Agriculture (2006–08); President of the Legislative Yuan (2016–20)
- Su Chia-fu (brother): Legislative Yuan member (2004–2005)
  - Su Chen-ching (nephew): Legislative Yuan member (2008–)

The Su family (Su Tong-chi)

- Su Tong-chi: Yunlin County councilor
- Su Hong Yueh-chiao (wife): Yunlin County councilor; Taiwan Provincial councillor
  - Su Chih-yang (daughter): Taiwan Provincial councilor; National Assembly member
  - Su Chih-fen (daughter): National Assembly member (1996–2000); Legislative Yuan member (2002–2005, 2016–), Yunlin County Magistrate (2005–14)

The Su family (Su Tseng-chang)

- Su Tseng-chang: Pingtung County magistrate (1989–93); Taipei County magistrate (1997–2004); Premier (2006–07, 2019–)
  - Su Chiao-hui (daughter): Legislative Yuan member (2016–)

The Tan–Chen family (Chen Cheng)

- Tan Zhonglin, Qing dynasty minister
  - Tan Yankai (son), Premier of the Republic of China (1928–30)
    - Tan Hsiang (granddaughter), Second Lady of the Republic of China (1954–65, while married to Chen Cheng)
    - Chen Cheng (husband of Tan Hsiang): Chief of the General Staff of the Republic of China Armed Forces (1946–48); Chairman of Taiwan Provincial Government (1949);Premier (1950–54；1958–63); Vice President of the Republic of China (1954–65)
      - Chen Li-an (great-grandson): Minister of Economic Affairs (1988–90); Ministry of National Defense (1990–93)；President of Control Yuan (1993–1995)

The Wang family of Kaohsiung (father-sons)

- Wang Yu-yun: Mayor of Kaohsiung (1973–81)
  - Wang Chih-hsiung (son): Member of the Legislative Yuan (1990–93; 96–99); Kaohsiung City Councilor (1999–2001)
  - Wang Shih-hsiung (son): Member of the Legislative Yuan (1990–96)

The Wu family

- Wu Hung-sen (elder brother): Taiwan Provincial Senate member (1946–51)
- Wu Hung-lin (younger brother): Taoyuan County councilor (1953–60, speaker: 1953–55); Taoyuan County Magistrate (1960–64)
  - Wu Po-hsiung (son): Taoyuan County Magistrate (1973–76); Mayor of Taipei (1988–90); Minister of the Interior (1984–88, 1991–94); Secretary General, Office of the President (1994–96); Secretary General, Kuomintang (1996–97); chairman, Kuomintang (2007–09)
    - John Wu (grandson): Legislative Yuan member (2005–09, 2016–); Taoyuan County Magistrate (2009–14); Commissioner, Chinese Professional Baseball League (2015–)
    - Wu Chih-kang (grandson): Taipei City Council member (2006–)

The Yu family (Kaohsiung County Black Faction)

- Yu Teng-fa: Mayor, Ch'iao-t'ou Township; National Assembly member (1947–73); Kaohsiung County magistrate (1960–63)
  - Yu Chen Yueh-ying (daughter-in-law): Taiwan Provincial councilor (1972–81); Legislative Yuan member (1984–85); Kaohsiung County magistrate (1985–93)
    - Yu Lin-ya (granddaughter): Taiwan Provincial councilor (1982–93); Legislative Yuan member (1993–99)
    - Yu Cheng-hsien (grandson): Legislative Yuan member (1987–93); Kaohsiung County magistrate (1993–2001); Minister of the Interior (2002–04)
    - Cheng Kuei-lien (granddaughter-in-law): National Assembly member (1996–2000, 05); Legislative Yuan member (2002–05)
    - Yu Jane-daw (grandson): Taiwan provincial councilor (1994–99); Legislative Yuan member (1999–2012)
  - Huang Yu Hsiu-luan (daughter): Legislative Yuan member (1981–84)
  - Huang Yu-jen (son-in-law): Kaohsiung County magistrate (1977–81)

Mongolian

- Gungsangnorbu (father), prince of the Right Harqin Banner, director of the Mongolian and Tibetan Affairs Commission for the Beiyang Government
  - Wu Jingbin (daughter), Legislative Yuan member (1948–1963), secretary-general of the Xinjiang Uyghur Autonomous Region Chinese People's Political Consultative Conference

== People's Republic of China ==
The Bo family

- Bo Yibo: Minister of Finance of China 1949–53, Vice Premier of China 1956–75, Vice Chairman of the Central Advisory Commission 1982–92
  - Bo Xilai (son): Governor of Liaoning 2003–04, Minister of Commerce of the PRC 2004–07, Chongqing Party Committee Secretary 2007–12

The Deng family

- Deng Xiaoping: Paramount leader of China and Communist Party 1978–89
  - Zhuo Lin (wife): Consultant to the General Office of the Central Military Committee
  - Deng Pufang (son): Vice Chairperson of the CPPCC and Chairman of the China Disabled Persons Federation
  - Deng Nan (daughter): Vice Minister of the State Science and Technology Commission 1998–2004
  - Deng Rong (daughter): Deputy President of the China Association for International Friendly Contact 1990–present
  - Deng Zhuodi (grandson): Sub-prefect of Pingguo County, Guangxi Zhuang Autonomous Region

The Hotung family

- Eric Peter Ho – civil servant and former Secretary for Social Services of Hong Kong

The Hu family

- Hu Jintao: Chinese paramount leader and General Secretary of the Chinese Communist Party 2002–12
  - Hu Haifeng (son): Party Committee Secretary of Lishui

The Li family

- Li Xiannian: President of China 1983–88, Chairperson of the Chinese People's Political Consultative Conference 1988–92
  - Lin Jiamei (wife): President of the Chinese Association for Female Doctors 2015–present
  - Li Xiaolin (daughter): Chairperson of the Chinese People's Association for Friendship with Foreign Countries 2011–present
  - Liu Yazhou (son-in-law): General of the People's Liberation Army Air Force

The Liu family

- Liu Shaoqi: Chairman of the Standing Committee of the National People's Congress 1954–59; President of China 1959–68
  - Wang Guangmei (wife): Member of the National Chinese People's Political Consultative Conference
  - Liu Yuan (son): Vice mayor of Zhengzhou and Political commissar of the General Logistics Department and Political commissar of the PLA Academy of Military Science and member of the 17th and the 18th Central Committee of the Chinese Communist Party
  - Liu Ting (daughter): Chairperson and President of the Asia Link Group, consultants in corporate finance

The Mao family

- Mao Zedong: Paramount leader of China and Chairman of the Chinese Communist Party 1949–76
  - Jiang Qing (Madame Mao): deputy leader of the Central Cultural Revolution Group and member of Politburo of the Chinese Communist Party
  - Mao Anqing (son): researcher at the Academy of Military Sciences and the Publicity Department of the Central Committee of the Chinese Communist Party
  - Shao Hua (daughter-in-law): member of the National Committee of the Chinese People's Political Consultative Conference
  - Li Min (daughter): member of the 10th National Congress of the Chinese People's Political Consultative Conference
  - Li Na (daughter of Mao Zedong): member of the 10th National Congress of the Chinese Communist Party in 1973, and the Party Chief of CPC Pinggu County Committee and Deputy Secretary of CPC Beijing Committee 1974–75
  - Mao Xinyu (grandson): member of the Chinese National Committee of the Chinese People's Political Consultative Conference
  - Mao Yuanxin (nephew): member of Central Committee, party secretary of Liaoning and political commissar of Shenyang Military Region

The Xi family

- Xi Zhongxun: First Vice Chairman of the Standing Committee of the National People's Congress 1988–93
  - Xi Jinping (son): General Secretary of the Chinese Communist Party 2012–present, President of China) 2013–present

The Zeng family

- Zeng Shan: Interior Minister of China, Minister of Commerce of China
  - Zeng Qinghong (son): Politburo Standing Committee member 2002–07, Vice President of China 2003–08

The Zhou family

- Zhou Enlai: Premier of China 1949–76 and Vice Chairman of the Chinese Communist Party and Foreign Minister of the PRC
  - Deng Yingchao (wife): Chairwoman of the National Committee of the Chinese People's Political Consultative Conference and Second Secretary of the Central Commission for Discipline Inspection

== Colombia ==
The Araújo family

- Consuelo Araújo: Culture minister
  - Hernando Molina Araújo: Governor of Cesar Department, son of Consuelo Araujo
  - Álvaro Araújo Castro; senator, nephew of Consuelo Araujo
  - María Consuelo Araújo: Foreign minister, sister of Alvaro Araujo

The Barco family (father-daughter)

- Virgilio Barco Vargas: President
  - Carolina Barco: Foreign Minister

The Holguín family

- Carlos Holguín Mallarino:Acting President of Colombia
- Jorge Holguín:Acting President of Colombia
- María Ángela Holguín: Foreign Minister
- Carlos Holguín Sardi: Senator and Minister of Interior
- Hernando Holguín y Caro: Foreign Minister

The Lleras-Restrepo family

- Lorenzo María Lleras: Foreign minister
- Sergio Camargo: President of Colombia
- Alberto Lleras Camargo: President of Colombia, grandson of Lorenzo María Lleras
- Carlos Lleras Restrepo: President of Colombia, great-grandson of Lorenzo María Lleras
- Carlos Lleras de la Fuente: Ambassador to the US, son of Carlos Lleras Restrepo
- Germán Vargas Lleras: President of the Senate, grandson of Carlos Lleras Restrepo

The López family

- Ambrosio López: popular leader during the middle of s. XIX
- Pedro A. López: entrepreneur and Minister, son of Ambrosio López
- Alfonso López Pumarejo: son of Pedro, President of Colombia (1934–38 and 1942–45).
- Alfonso López Michelsen: son of Alfonso, President of Colombia (1974–78)
- Alfonso López Caballero: son of López Michelsen, Ambassador, Minister of the Interior.
- María Mercedes Cuéllar López: cousin of López Caballero, Minister of Economic Development.
- Clara López Obregón: cousin of María Mercedes, President of the Alternative Democratic Pole Party.

The Pastrana family (father-son)

- Misael Pastrana Borrero, President of Colombia
  - Andrés Pastrana Arango, President of Colombia

The Santos family

- María Antonia Santos Plata: Martyr of the Colombian Independence.
- Eduardo Santos Montejo: President of Colombia (1938–42), grandnephew of Antonia.
- Francisco Santos Calderón: Vice President of Colombia (2002–10), grandnephew of Eduardo.
- Juan Manuel Santos Calderón: President of Colombia (2010–present), Minister of Defense (2006–10), former Minister of Foreign Trade (1991–94), and of Finance (2000–02), grandnephew of Eduardo, first cousin on both sides to Francisco.

The Vergara family

- Luis de Ayala y Vergara: Martyr of the Colombian Independence, President of the United Provinces of New Granada.
- Estanislao Vergara y Sanz de Santamaria: President of Gran Colombia and, Minister of Foreign Affairs, Internal Affairs, State, High Court & Justice.
- Felipe de Vergara Azcárate y Caycedo: President of the United Provinces of New Granada.
- Ignacio Gutierrez Vergara: President of the Granadine Confederation.
- Jose Maria Vergara y Vergara: Colombian diplomat, journalist, politician, and writer.
- Tomas Cipriano de Mosquera: was a Colombian general, political figure. He was president of Colombia four times.

== Comoros ==
The Ahmed family (grandfather-grandson)

- Hashimu bin Ahmed
- Said Hassane Said Hachim

The Said family

- Said Mohamed Jaffar
- Said Atthoumani
- Said Mohamed Cheikh
- Athoumane Said Ahmed
- Saidi Ali bin Saidi Omar
- Said Ibrahim Ben Ali
- Said Ali Kemal

The Soilih family (half-brothers)

- Ali Soilih, President of Comoros
- Said Mohamed Djohar, President of Comoros

== Democratic Republic of the Congo ==
Kabila family (father-children) (see also The Sassou-Nguesso family and Bongo family)

- Laurent-Désiré Kabila (President, 1997–2001)
  - Joseph Kabila (President, 2001–19)
    - Sandrine Nguesso (President of Congo-Brazzaville Denis Sassou Nguesso's daughter; married to Kabila)
  - Jaynet Kabila (Member of the National Assembly, 2011–)
  - Zoé Kabila (Member of the National Assembly, 2011–)

Kanza family (father-children)

- Daniel Kanza (Bourgmestre of Léopoldville, 1960–62, and vice-president of the ABAKO)
  - Sophie Lihau-Kanza (Secretary of State for Social Affairs, 1966–67, Minister of Social Affairs, 1967–68, Minister of State for Social Affairs, 1969–70)
  - Thomas Kanza (Ambassador of the Republic of the Congo to the United Kingdom, 1962–63, Minister of International Cooperation, 1997, Minister of Labour, 1998, Ambassador of the Democratic Republic of the Congo to Scandinavian Countries, 1999–2004)
  - Philippe Kanza (editor of the newspaper Congo)

Mobutu family (father-son)

- Mobutu Sese Seko (President, 1965–97)
  - Nzanga Mobutu (Deputy Prime Minister, 2008–11, leader of the Union of Mobutist Democrats)

Tshisekedi family (father-son)

- Étienne Tshisekedi (Prime Minister, 1991, 1992–93, 1997)
  - Felix Tshisekedi (President, 2019-)

Tshombe-Nguza family (uncle-nephew)

- Moise Tshombe (Prime Minister, 1964–65)
  - Jean Nguza Karl-i-Bond (Prime Minister, 1980–81, 1991–92)

== Cook Islands ==
The Henry family

- Albert Henry, Chief Minister
  - Sir Geoffrey Henry, Chief Minister

== Costa Rica ==
The Arias-Sánchez brothers

- Óscar Arias Sánchez (President of Costa Rica, 1986–90, 2006–10)
- Rodrigo Arias Sánchez (Presidential Chief of Staff)

The Calderón family

- Rafael Ángel Calderón Muñoz (Vice President of Costa Rica)
  - Rafael Ángel Calderón Guardia (son of Rafael Ángel Calderón Muñoz; President of Costa Rica, 1940–44)
    - Rafael Ángel Calderón Fournier (son of Rafael Ángel Calderón Guardia; President of Costa Rica, 1990–94)
  - Francisco Calderón Guardia (son of Rafael Ángel Calderón Muñoz; Vice President of Costa Rica)

The Figueres family (father-son)

- José Figueres Ferrer (President of Costa Rica, 1953–58 and 1970–74)
  - José María Figueres Olsen (President of Costa Rica, 1994–98)

The Jiménez family (father-son)

- Jesús Jiménez Zamora (President of Costa Rica, 1863–66 and 1868–70)
  - Ricardo Jiménez Oreamuno (President of Costa Rica, 1910–14, 1924–28 and 1932–36)

The Monge family (uncle-nephew)

- Luis Alberto Monge (President of Costa Rica, 1982–86)
  - Rolando Araya Monge (Transportation minister)

== Croatia ==
The Tuđman family

- Franjo Tuđman (President of Croatia, 1991–99)
  - Miroslav Tuđman (son of Franjo Tuđman; leader of Croatian True Revival)

== Cuba ==
The Castro family

- Fidel Castro (Prime Minister of Cuba, 1959–2008; President of Cuba, 1976–2008; First Secretary, 1965–2011)
- Raúl Castro (brother of Fidel Castro; second secretary, Communist Party of Cuba, 1965–2011; First Secretary, Communist Party of Cuba, 2011–present)
  - Vilma Espín Guillois wife of Raúl Castro and member of the Council of State of Cuba.
  - Mariela Castro daughter of Raúl Castro and Vilma Espín. Director of the Cuban National Center for Sex Education.
  - Alejandro Castro Espín son of Raúl Castro and Vilma Espín. Colonel of the Ministry of Interior of Cuba.

== Cyprus ==
Clerides family (father-daughter)

- Glafcos Clerides (President of Cyprus, 1974, 1993–2003)
  - Katherine Clerides (Member of the Parliament of Cyprus, 2006–)

Kyprianou family (father-son)

- Spyros Kyprianou (President of Cyprus, 1977–88)
  - Markos Kyprianou (Foreign Minister, 2008–11)

Papadopoulos family (father-son)

- Tassos Papadopoulos (President of Cyprus, 2003–08)
  - Nicolas Papadopoulos (Member of the Parliament of Cyprus, 2006–)

Vasiliou family (husband-wife)

- George Vasiliou (President of Cyprus, 1988–93)
- Androulla Vassiliou (European commissioner, 2008–)

== Czech Republic / Czechoslovakia ==
The Benda family

- Václav Benda (Member of the Federal Assembly, 1989–92; Senator, 1996–99)
  - Marek Benda (son of Václav Benda; Member of the Czech National Council, 1990–92; Member of the Chamber of Deputies, 1993–2002, 2004–)
  - Filip Benda (son of Václav Benda and brother of Marek Benda; director of cabinet of the Minister of Transport; director of cabinet of the Minister of Finances; candidate in 2014 European Parliament election)

The Dienstbier family

- Jiří Dienstbier (Minister of Foreign Affairs 1989–92; Senator 2008–11)
  - Jiří Dienstbier Jr. (son of Jiří Dienstbier, Minister for Human Rights and Equal Opportunities, 2014–16, Member of the Chamber of Deputies, 2011; Senator, 2011–)
    - Jiřina Dienstbierová (wife of Jiří Dienstbier Jr.; candidate in 2013 parliamentary election)

The Ferjenčík family

- Mikuláš Ferjenčík (Commissioner of the Interior of the Slovak Board of Commissioners, 1946–1948; member of Interim National Assembly, 1945–1946)
  - Olga Richterová (great-great-niece Mikuláš Ferjenčík; Member of the Chamber of Deputies, 2017–)
  - Mikuláš Ferjenčík (great-great-nephew of Mikuláš Ferjenčík; brother of Olga Richterová; Member of the Chamber of Deputies, 2017–2021)

The Heidler-Svoboda family

- Ferdinand Heidler (brother of Gustav Heidler; Member of Revolutionary National Assembly of Czechoslovakia, 1918-1920; Minister of Industry of Czechoslovakia, 1919-1920)
- Gustav Heidler (brother of Ferdinand Heidler; Member of Revolutionary National Assembly of Czechoslovakia, 1918-1920)
- Cyril Svoboda (grandson of Gustav Heidler; Member of the Chamber of Deputies, 1998-2010; Minister of Interior, 1998; Minister of Foreign Affairs, 2002-2006; Minister without Portfolio, 2007-2009; Minister of Regional Development, 2009; Leader of KDU-ČSL, 2009-2010)
  - Josef Svoboda (twin brother of Cyril Svoboda; candidate in 2024 Senate election)

The Klaus family

- Václav Klaus (President of the Czech Republic, 2003–13)
  - Václav Klaus Jr. (son of Václav Klaus; Member of the Chamber of Deputies, 2017–2021)
  - Jan Klaus (son of Václav Klaus; Member of the Republic Committee of Svobodní)

The Lobkowicz family

- Georg Christian, Prince of Lobkowicz (member of the Bohemian Diet, 1865–1872 and 1883–1907; Land Marshal of Bohemia, 1883–1907)
- František Lobkowicz (member of the Bohemian Diet, 1870–1972 and 1883–1887)
- Jiři Lobkowicz (Leader of Path of Change, 2001–2009)
- Jaroslav Lobkowicz (Member of the Chamber of Deputies, 1998–2006 and 2010–2017)
  - Tomáš Czernin (Jaroslav Lobkowicz's nephew; MEP, 2004; senator for Senate district 37 – Jičín, 2016–)

The Masaryk family

- Tomáš Masaryk (President of Czechoslovakia, 1918–35)
  - Jan Masaryk (son of Tomáš Masaryk; Minister of Foreign Affairs, 1940–48)
  - Alice Masaryková (daughter of Tomáš Masaryk; Member of Revolutionary National Assembly of Czechoslovakia, 1918-1919)

The Okamura family

- Tomio Okamura (leader of SPD; Member of the Chamber of Deputies, 2013–)
  - Hayato Okamura (brother of Tomio Okamura; member of the Chamber of Deputies of the Czech Republic, 2021–)
  - Osamu Okamura (brother of Tomio Okamura and Hayato Okamura)
  - Ignác Okamura (son of Hayato Okamura)

The Rakušan family

- Jan Rakušan (senator for Senate district 42 – Kolín, 2002–2008)
  - Vít Rakušan (son of Jan Rakušan; leader of STAN; and was the mayor of Kolín; Minister of the Interior)

The Stropnický family

- Martin Stropnický (Minister of Foreign Affairs, 2017–2018; Minister of Defence, 2014–2017, Minister of Culture, 1998; Member of the Chamber of Deputies, 2013–2018)
  - Matěj Stropnický (son of Martin; leader of Green party, 2016–2017; Councillor of Prague, 2014–2018)

The Šabata-Uhl family

- Jaroslav Šabata (Deputy to the Federal Assembly of Czechoslovakia, 1990; Minister Without Portfolio, 1990–1992)
  - Anna Šabatová (daughter of Jaroslav Šabata and wife of Petr Uhl; candidate in 2020 senate election)
- Petr Uhl (husband of Anna Šabatová; Member of the Federal Assembly of Czechoslovakia, 1990–1992)
  - Michal Uhl (son of Petr Uhl and Anna Šabatová; Councillor of Prague 2)

== Denmark ==
The Auken family

- Svend Auken (Member of The Folketing (The Danish Parliament) 1971–2009, Minister of Labor 1977–82 and Minister of Environment 1993–2001)
- Gunvor Auken (Deputy Mayor of Frederiksberg 1998–2002)
- Margrete Auken (Member of The Folketing (The Danish Parliament) 1979–90 and again from 1994 to 2004, Member of the European Parliament from 2004–)
  - Ida Auken (daughter of Margrethe Auken; Member of The Folketing (The Danish Parliament) 2007–)

The Ellemann-Jensen family

- Jens Peter Jensen (Member of The Folketing 1964–73, 1975–81, 1984–87 and 1988–90 and Deputy County Mayor of Fyn 1970–79)
  - Uffe Ellemann-Jensen (son of Jens Peter Jensen; Member of The Folketing 1977–2001, Foreign Minister 1982–93)
    - Karen Ellemann (daughter of Uffe Ellemann-Jensen; City Council Member of Rudersdal 2005–07, Member of The Folketing 2007–, Minister of the Interior 2009–10, Minister for the Environment 2010–11)
    - Jakob Ellemann-Jensen (son of Uffe Ellemann-Jensen; Member of The Folketing 2011–, Minister for Environment and Food 2018–19)

The Helveg Petersen family

- Kristen Helveg Petersen (Minister of Education 1961–64, Member of The Folketing 1964–75 and Member of the European Parliament 1973–75)
- Lilly Helveg Petersen (wife of Kristen HP; Deputy Mayor of Copenhagen)
  - Niels Helveg Petersen (son of Kristen and Lilly Helveg Petersen; Member of The Folketing 1966–74 and 1977–, Minister of Trade 1988–1990 and Foreign Minister 1993–2000)
  - Kirsten Lee (wife of Niels Helveg Petersen; Member of The Folketing 1987–90, and Regional Council Member 2005–)
    - Morten Helveg Petersen (son of Niels Helveg Petersen; Member of The Folketing 1998–2009)
    - Rasmus Helveg Petersen (son of Niels Helveg Petersen; Member of The Folketing 2011–, Minister for Development Cooperation 2013–)

The Hækkerup family

- Hans Kristen Hækkerup (Member of The Folketing (The Danish Parliament), 1920–29, and Mayor of Ringsted, 1927–29)
  - Hans Erling Hækkerup (son of Hans Kristen Hækkerup; Minister of Justice and later Minister of the Interior, 1953–68, Member of the Folketinget 1945–47 and 1948–71)
  - Per Hækkerup (son of Hans Kristen Hækkerup; Foreign Minister, Minister of Trade and Industry 1962–79)
  - Karen Margrete Hækkerup (wife of Per Hækkerup, Member of The Folketing 1964–66 and 1970–81)
    - Hans Hækkerup (son of Per Hækkerup, Minister of Defence 1993–2000, Member of The Folketing)
    - Lise Ingeborg Hækkerup (ex-wife of Hans Hækkerup, Member of The Folketing 1990–94, 1998–2001 and a bit of 2004)
    - Klaus Hækkerup (son of Per Hækkerup, Mayor of Frederiksværk 1978–88, Member of The Folketing 1988–)
      - Nick Hækkerup (son of Klaus Hækkerup, Mayor of Hillerød 2000–07, Member of the Folketing 2007–)
      - Ole Hækkerup (son of Klaus Hækkerup, Member of The Folketing 1998–2001)
      - Karen Angelo Hækkerup (wife of Ole Hækkerup, Member of The Folketing 2005–)

== Djibouti ==
The Gouled-Guelleh family

- Hassan Gouled Aptidon (President of Djibouti, 1977–99)
  - Ismail Omar Guelleh (nephew of Hassan Gouled Aptidon; President of Djibouti, 1999– )

== Dominica ==
The Boyd family

- Philip Ivor Boyd (first mayor of Roseau)
  - Cynthia Boyd Butler (Mayor of Roseau and daughter of Philip Ivor Boyd)
    - Jacob Allison Stewart- Boyd (Member of Legislative Council and Minister of Works under the F. Baron administration)
      - Alix Boyd Knights (Longest serving Speaker of the House)
        - Dr. Phillip Irving Boyd Public Health figure and first Head of the Cari-com Health Desk
          - Stanley Boyd Activist and conservationist (1948–2003), Writer, Inter isle Tennis Champ, editor of The Dominica Chronicle Newspaper (after Stewart)

The Douglas family

- R. B. D. Douglas (Member of Parliament for Portsmouth)
  - Adenauer "Washway" Douglas (son of R. B. D. Douglas; Mayor of Portsmouth)
  - Michael Douglas (son of R. B. D. Douglas; Member of Parliament for Portsmouth)
    - Ian Douglas (son of Michael Douglas; Member of Parliament for Portsmouth)
  - Rosie Douglas (son of R. B. D. Douglas; Prime Minister of Dominica, 2000)
    - Sean Douglas (nephew of Rosie Douglas, Senator)

== Dominican Republic ==
The Báez family

- Pablo Altagracia Báez (Mayor of Azua)
  - Buenaventura Báez (President of the Dominican Republic, 1849–53, 1856–58, 1865–66, 1868–74, 1876–78)
    - Altagracia Amelia Báez
      - José María Cabral y Báez
        - Auristela Cabral Bermúdez
          - Donald Reid Cabral (President of the Dominican Republic, 1963–65)
      - Mario Fermín Cabral y Báez (President of the Senate of the Dominican Republic, 1914–16, 1930–38, 1955)
        - Manuel del Cabral
          - Peggy Cabral (vice-mayor of Distrito Nacional, 1998–2002; Head of Dominican Revolutionary Party, 2013–)
    - Ramón Báez (President of the Dominican Republic, 1914)

The Bosch family

- Juan Bosch (President of the Dominican Republic, 1963)
  - Milagros Ortiz Bosch (niece of Juan Bosch; Vice President of the Dominican Republic, 2000–04)

The Cabral family

- José María Cabral (President of the Dominican Republic, 1865, 1866–68)
  - Marcos Antonio Cabral
    - José María Cabral y Báez
      - Auristela Cabral Bermúdez
        - Donald Reid Cabral (President of the Dominican Republic, 1963–65)
    - Mario Fermín Cabral y Báez (President of the Senate of the Dominican Republic, 1914–16, 1930–1938, 1955)
      - Manuel del Cabral
        - Peggy Cabral (vice-mayor of Distrito Nacional, 1998–2002; Head of Dominican Revolutionary Party, 2013–)

The Fernández family

- Leonel Fernández Reyna (President of the Dominican Republic, 1996–2000 and 2004–12)
  - Margarita Cedeño de Fernández (wife of Leonel Fernandez; Vice President of the Dominican Republic, 2012–present)

The Guillermo family

- Pedro Guillermo y Guerrero (President of the Dominican Republic, 1865)
  - Cesáreo Guillermo y Bastardo (President of the Dominican Republic, 1878 and 1879)

The Jimenes family

- Manuel Jimenes (President of the Dominican Republic, 1848–49)
  - Juan Isidro Jimenes Pereyra (son of Manuel Jimenes; President of the Dominican Republic, 1899–1902 and 1914–16)

The Medina family

- Danilo Medina (President of the Chamber of Deputies, 1994–95; President of the Dominican Republic, 2012–present)
- Lucía Medina (Vice President of the Chamber of Deputies, 2006–16; President of the Chamber of Deputies, 2016–present)

The Trujillo family

- Rafael Leónidas Trujillo (President of the Dominican Republic, 1930–38 and 1942–52)
  - Rafael "Ramfis" Trujillo (son of Rafael Trujillo)
  - Angelita Trujillo (daughter of Rafael Trujillo)
    - Ramfis Domínguez-Trujillo (grandson of Rafael Trujillo, son of Angelita Trujillo)
- Héctor Trujillo (brother of Rafael Trujillo; President of the Dominican Republic, 1952–60)

== Ecuador ==
The Arosemena family

- Carlos Julio Arosemena Tola (President of Ecuador, 1947–48)
  - Carlos Julio Arosemena Monroy (son; President of Ecuador, 1961–63)
  - Otto Arosemena (nephew of Carlos Julio Arosemena Tola; President of Ecuador, 1966–68)

The Bucaram family

- Assad Bucaram (Mayor of Guayaquil and President of the National Congress of Ecuador)
  - Abdalá Bucaram (nephew; President of Ecuador, 1996–97)
    - Abdalá Bucaram, Jr. (son of Abdalá senior; Member of the National Assembly)
  - Jaime Roldos Aguilera (nephew by marriage of Assad Bucaram; President of Ecuador, 1979–81)

The Noboa family

- Álvaro Noboa (Perennial candidate for president and Member of the National Assembly)
  - Anabella Azín (wife of Álvaro; Member of the National Congress and Member of the Constituent Assembly)
  - Daniel Noboa (son of Álvaro; Member of the National Congress; President of Ecuador, 2023–)

The Plaza family (father-son)

- Leonidas Plaza (President of Ecuador, 1901–1905 and 1912–1916)
  - Galo Plaza (President of Ecuador, 1948–1952)

== Egypt ==
El-Emam family

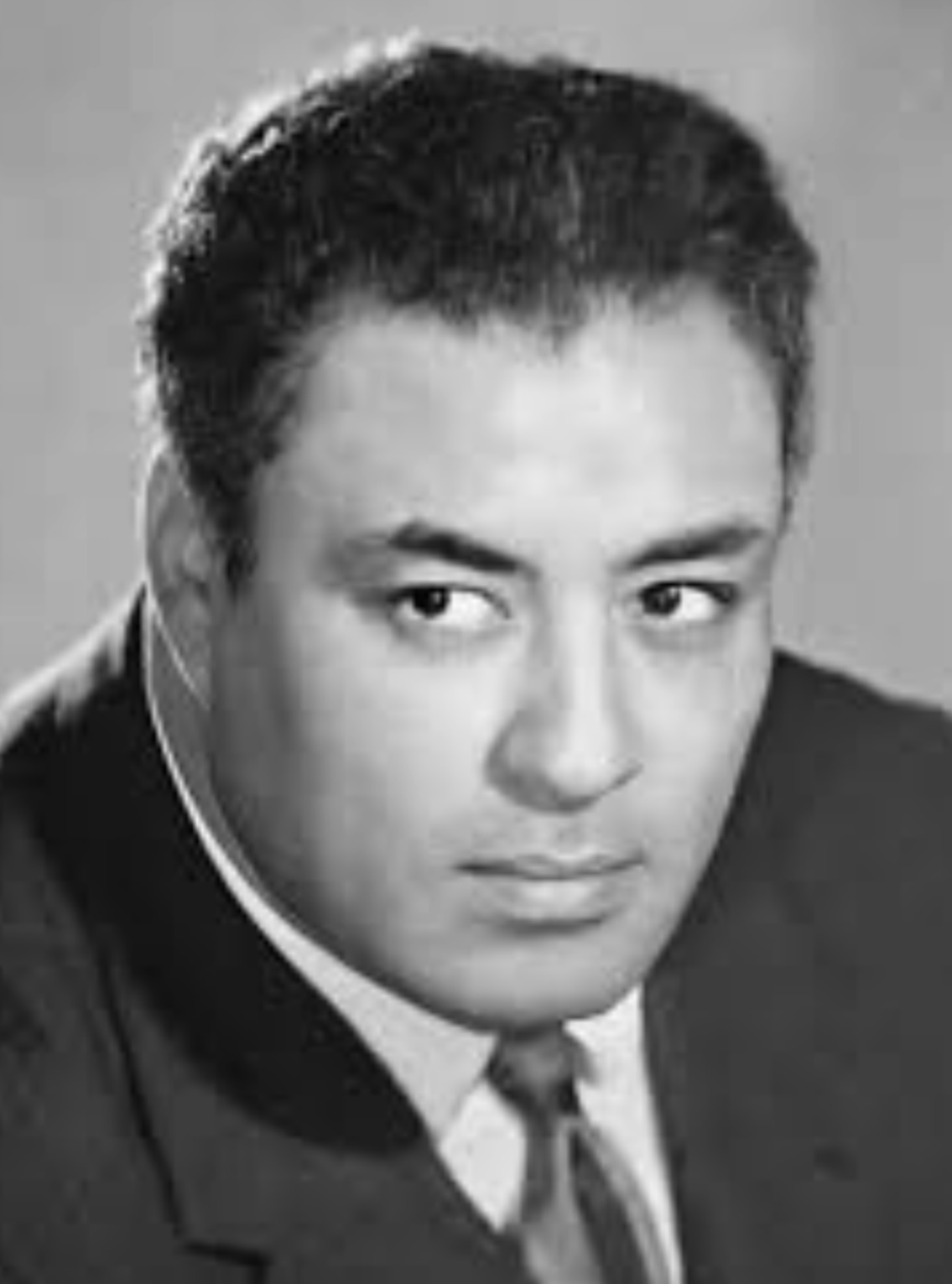
Hassan El-Emam

- Abu Uday el-Masry bin el-Emam: the founder, sheikh al-Islam, sheikh al-sheiokh of Egypt and their supporter in the Abbasid and Fatimid eras.
- Judge Abdel Latif bin el-Emam: Judge of El Mahalla El Kubra.
- Judge Abu Bakr bin el-Emam: Judge of Samannud.
- Judge El-Mohib bin el-Emam: Judge of El Mahalla El Kubra, the deputy of Qadi al-Qoudah (Chief Justice) and a religious scholar.
- Judge Zain el-Din Abdel Rahim bin el-Emam.
- Judge Abdel Qadir bin el-Emam.
- Judge Saad el-Din bin el-Emam: Judge of the sultan's diwan.
- Prince Alaa el-Din bin el-Emam: Amir al-Hajj, supervisor of Endowments, supervisor of the Armies, supervisor of Special, Secret Writer, founder of the updated Egyptian naval fleet.
- El-Emam Pasha El-Emam: Industrialist and Businessman.
- Mayor Abdel Hadi el-Emam: Mayor of Mit el-Sheyoukh village during the reign of King Farouk I.
- Mayor Farouk el-Emam: Current mayor of Mit el-Sheyoukh.
- Judge Mahmoud el-Emam.
- Businessman Mostafa el-Emam: Chairman of Sinacola council.
- Mohammed el-Imam: Writer and accountant.
- Hassan el-Imam: Film director.
- Hussein el-Imam: Actor.
- Moody el-Emam: Musician.

The Ghali family

- Boutros Ghali Pasha (Prime Minister of Egypt, 1908–1910)
  - Boutros Boutros-Ghali (grandson of Boutros Ghali Pasha)
    - Minister for Foreign Affairs
    - Secretary-General of the United Nations, 1992–1996
  - Youssef Boutros Ghali (nephew of Boutros Boutros-Ghali)
    - Minister for Economic Affairs (1999–2001)
    - Minister for Foreign Trade (2001–2004)
    - Minister for Finance and Insurance (2004– )

Anwar Sadat Family

- Anwar es-Sadat3rd (President of Egypt) 1970 - 1981

37th Prime Minister of Egypt 15 May 1980 – 1981 President: “Himself”

The Mubarak Family (father-son)

- Hosni Mubarak (President of Egypt, 1981–2011)
  - Gamal Mubarak (former General Secretary of the Policy Committee of the National Democratic Party)

The Morsi Family

- Mohamed Morsi 5th President of Egypt June 2012 – July 2013

Freedom and Justice Party (Egypt) is an Egyptian Islamist political party in Egypt It is nominally independent, but has strong links to the Muslim Brotherhood of Egypt, the largest political group the Arab World.:

The Sawiris Family

== El Salvador ==
The Meléndez-Quiñónez family

- Carlos Meléndez (President of El Salvador, 1913–14, 1915–18)
- Alfonso Quiñónez Molina (brother-in-law of Jorge Meléndez; President of El Salvador, 1914–15, 1918–19, 1923–27)
- Jorge Meléndez (brother of Carlos Meléndez; President of El Salvador, 1919–23)

== Equatorial Guinea ==
The Malabo-Seriche family (close relatives)

- Malabo Lopelo Melaka
- Cristino Seriche Bioko (Prime Minister, 1982-1992)

The Nguema-Esangui family (close relatives)

- Francisco Macías Nguema (President, 1968–79)
- Ela Nguema (Presidential Aide)
- Eyegue Ntutumu (governor of Río Muni)
- Teodoro Obiang Nguema Mbasogo (President, 1979–)

The Engonga Nguema-Esawong family (close relatives)

- Marcelino Nguema Onguene (Minister of Health, Minister of Economy and Trade, Minister Secretary of the Presidency, President of the Parliament, The Ombudsman, 1979-2020)
- Clemente Engonga Nguema Onguene (Minister of Interior, Vice-Prime Minister In Charge of Democracy & Interior, Vice-Prime Minister in Charge of Education and Sports, 1989-)
- Javier-Clemente Engonga Avomo (Director General of Local Content in the Oil Industry, Director General for Business Promotion and Private Investments, Director General of Trade, 2010-2018)
- Baltasar Ebang Engonga (Director General of ANIF, Director General of Banking and Finance, 2010-2018)

== Estonia ==
The Grünthal family

- Timotheus Grünthal
  - Ivar Grünthal (son of Timotheus Grünthal)
- Jaan Poska
  - Vera Poska-Grünthal (wife of Timotheus and daughter of Jaan)

The Helme family

- Mart Helme
  - Martin Helme (son of Mart Helme, nephew of Rein Helme)
  - Helle-Moonika Helme (wife of Mart Helme)
- Rein Helme (brother of Mart Helme)

The Jürgenson family

- Kalle Jürgenson
- Toivo Jürgenson (brother of Kalle Jürgenson)

The Kallas family

- Siim Kallas (Prime Minister of Estonia)
  - Kaja Kallas (daughter of Siim Kallas, prime minister)

The Lauristin-Allik family

- Johannes Lauristin (first husband of Olga Lauristin, father of Marju Lauristin)
- Olga Lauristin (wife of Johannes Lauristin and later Hendrik Allik, mother of Marju Lauristin and Jaak Allik)
  - Marju Lauristin (daughter of Johannes and Olga Lauristin)
- Hendrik Allik (second husband of Olga Lauristin, father of Jaak Allik)
  - Jaak Allik (son of Hendrik Allik and Olga Lauristin, half brother of Marju Lauristin)

The Mathiesen family

- Mihkel Mathiesen
  - Mait Mihkel Mathiesen (son of Mihkel Mathiesen)

The Lenk family

- Heimar Lenk
- Marika Tuus (sister of Heimar Lenk)

The Lotman family

- Mihhail Lotman (son of Juri Lotman, brother of Aleksei Lotman)
- Aleksei Lotman (son of Juri Lotman, brother of Mihhail Lotman)

The Must family

- Aadu Must
  - Kadri Simson (daughter of Aadu Must)

The Oviir family

- Siiri Oviir
- Mihkel Oviir (husband of Siiri Oviir)

The Päts family

- Konstantin Päts
  - Viktor Päts (son of Konstantin Päts)
    - Matti Päts (grandson of Konstantin Päts)
  - Leo Päts (son of Konstantin Päts; et:Leo Päts)
- Peeter Päts (brother of Konstantin Päts)
- Voldemar Päts (brother of Konstantin Päts)

The Ratas family

- Rein Ratas
  - Jüri Ratas (son of Rein Ratas)

The Reiljan family

- Villu Reiljan
- Janno Reiljan (brother of Villu Reiljan)

The Sarapuu family

- Arvo Sarapuu
- Kersti Sarapuu (wife of Arvo Sarapuu)

The Savisaar family

- Edgar Savisaar
- Vilja Savisaar (former wife of Edgar Savisaar)

The Tarand family

- Andres Tarand
  - Indrek Tarand (son of Andres Tarand)
  - Kaarel Tarand (son of Andres Tarand)

The Tõnisson family

- Jaan Tõnisson
  - Ilmar Tõnisson (son of Jaan Tõnisson)

The Tsahkna family

- Anders Tsahkna (et:Anders Tsahkna)
- Margus Tsahkna

The Uluots family

- Jaan Uluots
  - Jüri Uluots (son of Jaan Uluots)
    - Ülo Uluots (nephew of Jüri Uluots)

The Veidemann family

- Andra Veidemann
- Rein Veidemann (husband of Andra Veidemann)

== Finland ==
The Heinäluoma Family

- Eero Heinäluoma (MEP)
  - Eveliina Heinäluoma (daughter, MP)

The Kalli family

- Timo Kalli (MP)
  - Eeva Kalli (daughter, MP)

The Kuusinen Family

- Otto Ville Kuusinen (communist leader, fled to the Soviet Union and became a prominent politician there)
  - Hertta Kuusinen (daughter, MP for the Finnish People's Democratic League 1945–1971)

The Paasio family (father-son-granddaughter)

- Rafael Paasio (social democratic party leader)
  - Pertti Paasio (son, social democratic party leader)
    - Heli Paasio (daughter of Pertti Paasio, MP)

The Tuomioja–Wuolijoki family

- Walto Tuomioja (MP)
  - Sakari Tuomioja (son Prime Minister)
    - Erkki Tuomioja (son Foreign Minister)
- Juho Wuolijoki (MP)
  - Wäinö Wuolijoki (son Speaker of Parliament)
  - Sulo Wuolijoki (son MP)
    - Hella Wuolijoki (spouse MP)

The Vennamo family (father-son)

- Veikko Vennamo (Cabinet minister)
  - Pekka Vennamo (Cabinet minister)

The Aura family (father-son-grandson)

- Jalo Aura (Cabinet minister)
  - Teuvo Aura (Cabinet minister)
    - Matti Aura (Cabinet minister)

The Häkämies family (father-son-son)

- Erkki Häkämies (MP)
  - Jyri Häkämies (Cabinet minister)
  - Kari Häkämies (Cabinet minister)

== France ==
The Bardoux-Giscard d'Estaing Family

- Agénor Bardoux, (Minister of State Education)
  - Jacques Bardoux, (French senator 1938–1940, Deputy 1945–1955), son of Agénor Bardoux
    - Valéry Giscard d'Estaing, (President of the Republic 1974–1981), grandson of Jacques Bardoux
      - Louis Giscard d'Estaing, (Member of Parliament 2002–2012), son of Valéry Giscard d'Estaing

The Cazeneuve family

- Jean-René Cazeneuve (MP)
  - Pierre Cazeneuve, son of Jean-René (MP)
  - Marguerite Cazeneuve, daughter of Jean-René (political adviser)
    - Aurélien Rousseau, partner of Marguerite (cabinet minister)

The Debré family

- Michel Debré, Prime Minister of France under de Gaulle;
  - Jean-Louis Debré, son of Michel, President Speaker of the French National Assembly from 2002 to 2007, President of the Constitutional Council (France) from 2007 to 2016;
  - Bernard Debré, son of Michel and brother of Jean-Louis, former minister, member of the French National Assembly, professor of medicine.

The De Gaulle family

- Pierre de Gaulle – Senator 1948–1951, then Member of Parliament 1951–1956; younger brother of Charles
- Charles de Gaulle – President of the Republic 1959–1969
  - Philippe de Gaulle – French senator; son of Charles de Gaulle
    - Charles de Gaulle, Jr. – Member of the European Parliament for the right-wing National Rally; grandson of Charles de Gaulle

The Hollande family

- François Hollande – President of the French Republic
- Segolène Royal (ex wife) – French politician, former minister, and unsuccessful candidate for the presidency of the French Republic (2007)

The François-Poncet-Missoffe-Panafieu family

- André François-Poncet – French politician, former secretary of state, father of
  - Jean François-Poncet, brother-in-law of Helène Missoffe – French politician, former senator, former ambassador, brother-in-law of
  - Hélène Missoffe, French politician, former minister, former member of French Parliament, wife of
  - François Missoffe, French politician, former minister, former ambassador, father of
    - Françoise de Panafieu – French politician, former minister, former member of French Parliament

The Le Pen family

- Jean-Marie Le Pen – founder of the right-wing National Rally
  - Marine Le Pen – President of the National Rally
    - Marion Maréchal-Le Pen – Member of Parliament (2012–2017), granddaughter of Jean-Marie Le Pen and niece of Marine Le Pen.

The Mitterrand family (uncle-nephew)

- François Mitterrand – President of the Republic 1981–95
  - Frédéric Mitterrand – Minister of Culture and Communication 2009–12

The Casimir-Perier family

- Casimir Perier, Prime Minister
  - Auguste Casimir-Perier, Interior Minister, son of Casimir Perier
    - Jean Casimir-Perier, President, son of Auguste Casimir-Perier

The Poniatowski family

- Michel Poniatowski, Minister of health, Minister of the interior, Member of Parliament, MEP, Senator, Mayor of L'Isle-Adam, father of
  - Ladislas Poniatowski, Member of Parliament, Senator, Mayor of Quillebeuf-sur-Seine, General Councillor
  - Axel Poniatowski, Member of Parliament, Chairman of the Foreign Affairs Committee, Mayor of L'Isle-Adam, General Councillor, father of
    - Sébastien Poniatowski, Mayor of L'Isle-Adam

The Sarkozy family

- Nicolas Sarkozy, President of the Republic 2007–12
  - Jean Sarkozy, French UMP politician, son of Nicolas Sarkozy

The Villepin family (father-son)

- Xavier de Villepin – Senator
  - Dominique de Villepin (Secretary of State for Foreign Affairs, Secretary of State for the Interior, Prime Minister of France), son of Xavier de Villepin

== Gabon ==
The M'ba-Eyeghe Ndong family

- Léon M'ba (President)
  - Jean Eyeghe Ndong (nephew, Prime Minister)

The Sassou-Nguesso family and Bongo family

- Emmanuel Yoka (Congolese cabinet chief; uncle of Sassou-Nguesso)
  - Denis Sassou-Nguesso (President of the Republic of Congo)
    - Jean-Dominique Okemba (leader of national Security Council; nephew of Sassou-Nguesso)
    - Edgar Nguesso (nephew of Sassou-Nguesso; director of estate)
    - Hilaire Moko (director of government security; nephew of Sassou-Nguesso)
    - Denis Christel Nguesso (nephew of Sassou-Nguesso; senior state oil company official)
    - Wilfrid Nguesso (brother of Edgar; senior parastatal director)
    - Jean-Dominique Okemba, (Secretary General of his Security Council; nephew of Sassou-Nguesso)
  - Gabriel Oba-Apounou (vice-president of National Assembly of Gabon; cousin of Sassou-Nguesso)
    - Claudia Lemboumba-Nguesso (Sassou's daughter; wife of M. Leboumba; communications director)
    - Martin Lemboumba (husband of Lemboumba-Nguesso; son of J. Lemboumba)
      - Jean-Pierre Lemboumba (Finance Minister; father of M. Leboumba)
        - Sandrine Nguesso (Sassou's daughter; married to Kabila)
        - Joseph Kabila (President of the Democratic Republic of the Congo) (see also Kabila family)
  - Antoinette Sassou Nguesso (First Lady of the Republic of Congo; married to Sassou-Nguesso)
    - Edith Nguesso-Bongo (Sassou-Nguesso's daughter)
    - Omar Bongo (President of Gabon and husband of Edith Sassou-Nguesso)
      - Ali Bongo Ondimba (President of Gabon and son of Omar)
      - Pascaline Bongo Ondimba (Foreign Minister of Gabon, current Presidential Cabinet Director, and daughter of Omar)
      - Paul Toungui (Foreign Minister of Gabon, husband of Pascaline)
      - Martin Bongo (Foreign Minister of Gabon, nephew of Omar)
      - Alex Bongo (Head of the national Internet agency)
      - Frédéric Bongo (Head of the Intelligence service)
      - Christian Bongo (Head of the Gabon Development Bank)
      - Jean-Boniface Assélé (Commander-in-Chief of the National Police Forces, and brother of Pascaline)
      - Brice Clotaire Oligui Nguema (Interim President of Gabon and Commander-in-Chief of the Gabonese Republican Guard, and cousin of Ali)
        - Régis Onanga Ndiaye (Minister for Foreign Affairs, brother-in-law of President Brice)
      - Grégoire Kouna (Commander-in-Chief of the Gabonese Republican Guard, and cousin of Ali)
      - Idriss Ngari (Defense Minister of Gabon, and nephew of Omar)

== Germany ==
The Adenauer Family

- Konrad Adenauer, Chancellor of Germany
  - Max Adenauer, Oberstadtdirektor and Councillor in Cologne, son of Konrad
    - Sven-Georg Adenauer, Landrat (district director) in the Landkreis (district) of Gütersloh, grandson of Konrad

The Albrecht family (father–daughter)

- Ernst Albrecht, (Minister-President of Lower Saxony)
  - Ursula von der Leyen, (President of the European Commission, 2019–present, Federal Minister of Defence 2013–2019, Federal Minister of Labour and Social Affairs, 2009–2013, Federal Minister of Family Affairs, Senior Citizens, Women and Youth, 2005–2009), daughter of Ernst

The Bismarck family

- Otto von Bismarck, Chancellor (Minister-President) of the German Empire, 1871–90
  - Herbert von Bismarck, (Minister from 1888 to 1890, Member of the Reichstag from 1893), son of Otto
    - Otto von Bismarck, Jr., (1897–1975, Member of the Reichstag 1924–28, Member of the Bundestag 1953–65), son of Herbert
      - Carl-Eduard von Bismarck, (Member of the Bundestag 2005–07), grandson of Otto Jr.
    - Gottfried von Bismarck, (1901–49, Member of the Reichstag 1933–44), son of Herbert

The Bülow family

- Bernhard Ernst von Bülow (1815–79), German Minister of the Exterior
  - Bernhard von Bülow (1849–1929), Minister of the Exterior, Chancellor, son of the former
    - Bernhard Wilhelm von Bülow, vice Minister of the Exterior, nephew of the former

The Bülows are an old Mecklenburg aristocratic dynasty with many members active in politics, in church or in the military.

The de Maizière family

- Ulrich de Maizière, inspector general of the West German Army
  - Lothar de Maizière, (Minister-President of the German Democratic Republic March–October 1990), nephew of Ulrich
  - Thomas de Maizière, (Federal Minister of the Interior and Defense from 2009 to 2018), son of Ulrich and cousin of Lothar

The Ebert family (father-son)

- Friedrich Ebert, President of Germany
  - Friedrich Ebert Jr., Mayor of East Berlin

The Goppel family

- Alfons Goppel, (Minister-President of the state of Bavaria)
  - Thomas Goppel, (Minister of Science, Research and the Arts of the state of Bavaria), son of Alfons

The Guttenberg family

- Karl Ludwig von Guttenberg, Member of the resistance against Hitler (d. 1945)
- Georg Enoch, Freiherr von und zu Guttenberg, (Hereditary Peer in Bavaria), brother of Karl Ludwig
  - Karl Theodor Freiherr von und zu Guttenberg, (co-founder of a Bavarian party, Member of the German Parliament), son of Georg Enoch
    - Karl-Theodor zu Guttenberg, Federal Minister of Defence between 2009 and 2011, grandson of Karl Theodor

The Gysi family (father and son)

- Klaus Gysi, (GDR Minister of Culture, Ambassador to Italy, State Secretary for Church Affairs) (d. 1999)
  - Gregor Gysi, (Human rights lawyer, chair of the Party of Democratic Socialism (PDS, now Die Linke), leader of PDS fraction in the Bundestag, Economics Senator in Berlin city government), son of Klaus

The Koch family

- Karl-Heinz Koch, (Justice Minister in Hesse)
  - Roland Koch, (former Minister-President of Hesse), son of Karl-Heinz

The Lambsdorff family

- Otto Graf Lambsdorff, Minister of Economics (1977–1982, 1982–1984)
- Alexander Graf Lambsdorff, MEP (since 2004), nephew of Otto Graf Lambsdorff

The Niklas/Ertl family

- Wilhelm Niklas, (Minister for Agriculture) (d. 1957)
  - Josef Ertl, (Minister for Agriculture) (d. 2000), son-in-law of Wilhelm

The Ratzinger family

- Georg Ratzinger, Member of Reichstag
  - Benedict XVI, Pope and sovereign of Vatican City, grand-nephew of Georg

The Schäuble family

- Karl Schäuble, Member of Parliament, Baden (1947–1952)
  - Thomas Schäuble, Minister for Transport, Justice and the Interior of Baden-Württemberg, son of Karl
  - Wolfgang Schäuble, Federal Minister of the Interior and of Finance and incumbent President of the Bundestag, son of Karl
    - Thomas Strobl, former member of the Bundestag and current deputy prime minister of Baden-Württemberg, son-in-law of Wolfgang

The Rothschild Sons & Family

The Speer family (father–daughter)

- Albert Speer, (Nazi Minister of Armaments and War Production)
  - Hildegard Schramm (vice-president of the Berlin House of Deputies), daughter of Albert

The Strauss family (father–daughter)

- Franz Josef Strauss, (Minister-President of the state of Bavaria)
  - Monika Hohlmeier, (Minister of Education and the Arts of the state of Bavaria), daughter of Franz Josef

The Vogel brothers

- Bernhard Vogel, (Minister-President of Rheinland-Pfalz and Minister-President of Thuringia), CDU
- Hans-Jochen Vogel, (Mayor of Munich, Mayor of Berlin, Minister of Justice), SPD

The Weizsäcker family (grandfather-father-son-nephew)

- Karl Hugo von Weizsäcker (Minister-President of Württemberg)
  - Ernst von Weizsäcker (Diplomat, Head of the Political Department of the Foreign Office); son of Karl Hugo
    - Richard von Weizsäcker (President of Germany); son of Ernst
      - Ernst Ulrich von Weizsäcker (German Member of Parliament); nephew of Richard
        - Jakob von Weizsäcker (Member of the European Parliament); son of Ernst Ulrich

== Ghana ==
The Agyarko family (brothers and sister)

- Boakye Agyarko (Minister)
- Emmanuel Kwabena Kyeremateng Agyarko (M.P.)
- Dedo Difie Agyarko-Kusi Parliamentary aspirant, ambassador

The Ahwoi family (brothers)

- Kwamena Ahwoi (Minister)
- Kwesi Ahwoi (Minister)
- Ato Ahwoi

The Akufo-Addo family (father-son)

- Edward Akufo-Addo (President, 1970–1972)
  - Nana Akufo-Addo (President, 2017–present, Foreign Minister, 2003–2007)

The Atta Mills family (brothers)

- John Atta Mills (President, 2009–2012, Vice President, 1997–2000)
- Samuel Atta Mills (MP)

The Ayariga family (father, sons)

- Frank Abdulai Ayariga (MP 1979–1981)
  - Hassan Ayariga (son) (presidential candidate)
  - Mahama Ayariga (son) (MP, 2005–2009, 2013–present, Minister, Deputy Minister, Presidential Spokesman)

The Bawumia family (father, son, daughter-in-law)

- Mumuni Bawumia (former member of Council of State)
  - Mahamudu Bawumia (son) (Vice President)
  - Samira Bawumia (daughter-in-law, née Ramadan (wife of Vice President Bawumia. See Ramadan family)

The Jinapor family (brothers)

- Samuel Abu Jinapor (Deputy Chief of staff)
- John Jinapor (MP, Deputy Minister)

The Kufuor family (brothers, brother-in-law)

- John Kufuor (President, 2001–2008)
- Kwame Addo-Kufuor (MP, Minister of Defence, presidential candidate)
- J. H. Mensah (brother-in-law of John Kufuor MP, Minister)

The Marfo family (brothers)

- Yaw Osafo-Marfo (MP Minister)
- Isaac K. Adjei-Marfo (former Secretary for Agriculture and later for Cocoa Affairs)

The Mahama family (father-son)

- Emmanuel Adama Mahama (father) (MP and Minister, 1st Republic, Presidential adviser, 3rd Republic)
  - John Dramani Mahama son, President, 2012–2017, Vice President, 2009–2012, MP, Minister)

The Nkrumah family (father- daughter-son)

- Kwame Nkrumah (father, leader of government business, first prime minister, first President MP)
  - Samia Nkrumah (daughter, MP, 2008–2012, chairman of political party)
  - Sekou Nkrumah (son)

The Obetsebi-Lamptey family (father, son)

- Emmanuel Obetsebi-Lamptey
  - Jacob Otanka Obetsebi-Lamptey (son) (Party Chairman, chief of staff, Minister, Presidential candidate)

The Ocquaye family (father, son)

- Aaron Mike Oquaye (Minister, Speaker of parliament, MP)
  - Mike Ocquaye Junior (Ambassador, Parliamentary aspirant)

The Ofori Atta family

- J. B. Danquah (former political party chairman)
  - Aaron Ofori-Atta (former Speaker of Parliament, Minister)
  - Adeline Akufo-Addo (former First Lady)
    - Nana Akufo-Addo (President, 2017–present) See Akufo Addo family
  - William Ofori Atta (former Minister and presidential candidate)
  - Akwasi Amoako-Atta (former bank governor and Minister)
  - Jones Ofori Atta (Deputy Minister)
    - Ken Ofori-Atta (Finance Minister, 2017-Date)

The Okudzeto family (father, nephews)

- Sam Okudzeto (MP, Member of Council of State)
  - Samuel Okudzeto Ablakwa (nephew) (Deputy Minister, MP)
  - Perry Curtis Kwabla Okudzeto (nephew) (Deputy Minister)

The Ramadan family (father, son, daughter)

- Ahmed Ramadan (former political party chairman)
  - Mohammed Adamu Ramadan (MP aspirant, presidential staffer)
  - Abu Ramadan (political party youth organiser, deputy head of National Disaster Management Authority)
  - Samira Bawumia née Ramadan (wife of Vice President Bawumia. See Bawumia family)

The Rawlings family (father-wife-daughter)

- Jerry Rawlings (Soldier, Head of State and President, 1979, 1981–2000 founder of political party)
- Nana Konadu Agyeman Rawlings (wife)(Vice Chair of a political party, founder of political party, presidential candidate, leader of women's movement)
  - Zanetor Agyeman-Rawlings (daughter)(MP, 2016–Present)

The Smith family (brothers)

- Joseph Henry Smith (Minister, Ambassador)
- Emmanuel Victor Smith (Spokesperson for ex president, Ambassador)

== Guatemala ==
The Arévalo family

- Juan José Arévalo (father; President of Guatemala)
- Bernardo Arévalo (son; President of Guatemala)

The Cerezo family

- Marco Vinicio Cerezo Sierra (Supreme Court judge)
- Vinicio Cerezo (President of Guatemala)
- Celso Cerezo (legislative deputy)

The Colom family

- Manuel Colom (mayor of Guatemala City)
  - Álvaro Colom (nephew of Manuel, President)
    - Sandra Torres (wife of Alvaro, first lady)
      - Nadia de León Torres (daughter of Sandra, legislative deputy)

The Rios family

- Efraín Rios Montt (former de facto Head of State and Congressman)
- Zury Ríos Sosa (Legislative deputy and presidential current candidate)

== Guyana ==
The Burnham family

- Forbes Burnham (President of Guyana, 1980–85; Prime Minister of Guyana, 1966–80)
- Viola Burnham (wife of Forbes Burnham; Vice President, 1985–91)

The Jagan family

- Cheddi Jagan (President of Guyana, 1992–97)
- Janet Jagan (wife of Cheddi Jagan; President of Guyana, 1997–99)
  - Cheddi "Joey" Jagan Jr., son of Cheddi and Janet
- Derek Chunilall Jagan (brother of Cheddi Jagan; Speaker of the National Assembly of Guyana)

== Haiti ==
The Duvalier family (father-son)

- François Duvalier (President of Haiti, 1957–71)
  - Jean-Claude Duvalier (son of François Duvalier; President of Haiti, 1971–86)

== Honduras ==
The Azcona family (father-sons)

- José Azcona del Hoyo President of Honduras (1986–-90)
  - Jose Simon Azcona Bocock, Tegucigalpa Regidor (2002–-06) and Francisco Morazán Department Deputy (2006–2010)
  - Elizabeth Azcona Bocock or Lizi Azcona, Secretary of Industry and Commerce of Honduras (2006)

The Flores family (father-daughter)

- Carlos Roberto Flores President of Honduras (1998–2002)
  - Mary Elizabeth Flores Flake or Lizzie Flores daughter of Carlos Roberto Flores, Deputy of the Francisco Morazán Department and First Vice-President of the Congress (2002-2008)

The Melgar family (spouses)

- Juan Alberto Melgar Castro, President of Honduras (1975–78)
- Nora Gúnera de Melgar (Mayor and Presidential candidate) and deputy candidate in the Primary Elections in 2008

The Reina brothers

- Carlos Roberto Reina, President of Honduras (1994–98)
- Jorge Arturo Reina Idiáquez, Interior Minister (2006–07)

The Williams family

- Abraham Williams Calderón, Vice President of Honduras
- Vicente Williams Agasse, Vice President of Honduras

== Hungary ==
The Antall family (grandfather–father–son)

- József Antall (Government Commissioner for Refugees in the Second World War, Minister for Reconstruction after 1945)
  - József Antall (Prime Minister 1990–93), son of József Antall
    - Péter Antall (Director of the Democratic Forum [MDF]'s Political Foundation), son of József Antall jr.

The Göncz family (father–daughter)

- Árpád Göncz (President)
  - Kinga Göncz (foreign minister), daughter of Árpád

The Szakasits family

- Árpád Szakasits
- Klára Szakasits (daughter)
- János Schiffer (grandson)
- András Schiffer (great grandson)

== Indonesia ==
The Mintaredja Family

- Mohammad Syafaat Mintaredja founder and 1st chairman of the United Development Party (1973 – 1978), 19th Ministry of Social Affairs (Indonesia) (1971 – 1978), 7th Ambassador of Indonesia to Turkey (1980 – 1983)
- Evac Syafruddin Mintaredja (eldest son of Mohammad Syafaat Mintaredja; Head of the Media Bureau at Ministry of State Secretariat under Vice President Jusuf Kalla)

== Iran ==
The Davidkhanian Family

- Markar Khan Davidkhanian, Minister of Finance (1804–1848)
  - David Khan Davidkhanian, Ambassador and Chief Physician to the Shah of Iran (1795–1851)
  - Martiros Khan Davidkhanian, General and Chief of Staff of the Cossack Brigade (1843–1905)
  - Eskandar Khan Davidkhanian, General and Deputy Commander of the Cossack Brigade
  - Sarkis Khan Davidkhanian, General and Founder of the modern Iranian Postal System (1846-)
  - Soleiman Khan Davidkhanian, General (1852–1895)
  - Meguertitch Khan Davidkhanian, Governor of Dezful and Khorramshahr (1902–1983)

The Khamenei family (grand children (1st cousins) and great-grandchildren (2nd cousins) are married to each other)

- Ayatollah Ali Khamenei, Supreme Leader of Iran
  - Gholam Ali Haddad-Adel, Speaker of the Parliament

The Mosaddegh family (father-in-law, son-in-law)

- Mohammad Mosaddegh, Prime Minister (1951–53)
  - Ahmad Matin-Daftari, Prime Minister (1939–40)

The Mansur Family (father-son)

- Ali Mansur, Prime Minister (1940–41, 1950)
  - Hassan Ali Mansur, Prime Minister (1964–65)

The Zahedi Family (father-son)

- Fazlollah Zahedi, Prime Minister (1953–1955)
  - Ardeshir Zahedi, Foreign Minister (1966–1973)

The Larijani family (father-son, groom)

- Mirza Hashem Amoli
  - Mohammad-Javad Larijani
  - Ali Larijani
  - Sadeq Larijani
  - Bagher Larijani
  - Fazel Larijani
  - Mostafa Mohaghegh Damad (family groom)

== Iraq ==
The Allawi-Chalabi family

- Abdul Majid Allawi OBE (Minister of Transport, Lord at the House of Lords before 1958)
- Abdul Amir Allawi (Minister of Health, before 1958)
  - Ali Allawi (Defense Minister and Minister of Trade), son of Abdul Amir and cousin of Iyad Allawi
- Jaffar Allawi (Minister of Housing)
- Iyad Allawi (Prime Minister)
  - Sarah Iyad Allawi (Member of the Iraqi National Accord, Political activist, advisor and Businesswoman), Daughter of Iyad Allawi
- Mohammad Allawi (Minister of Telecommunications)
- Nouri al-Badran (interior minister), brother-in-law of Iyad Allawi
- Ahmed Chalabi (former Iraqi Governing Council President), uncle of Ali Allawi
- Salem Chalabi (head of judicial panel to try Saddam Hussein), nephew of Ahmed Chalabi

The Arif family

- Abdul Salam Arif (President)
- Abdul Rahman Arif (President), brother of Abdul Salam Arif

The Barzani family

- Mustafa Barzani (leader of the Kurdistan Democratic Party)
- Massoud Barzani (President of Iraqi Kurdistan), son of Mustafa Barzani
- Nechervan Idris Barzani (Prime Minister of Iraqi Kurdistan), nephew of Mustafa Barzani
- Masrour Barzani Head of the Kurdistan Region Security Council

The Hussein family

- Saddam Hussein (former President)
  - Raghad Hussien (Iraqi politician) daughter of Saddam Hussein
  - Uday Hussein, son of Saddam Hussein
  - Qusay Hussein (Leader of the Iraqi Republican Guard) son of Saddam Hussein
- Barzan Ibrahim al-Tikriti (Head of the Iraqi Intelligence service) Half brother of Saddam Hussein
- Sabawi Ibrahim al-Tikriti (Head of the Directorate of General Secretary) Half brother of Saddam Hussein
- Watban Ibrahim al-Tikriti (Minister of interior) Half brother of Saddam Hussein
- Ahmed Hassan al-Bakr (former President) Father in law of Saddam Hussein's cousin

Al-Suwaidi Family

- Yusuf Al-Suwaidi (First Iraqi Speaker of the Senate and Revolutionary)
  - Naji Al-Suwaidi (Iraqi Prime minister, son of Yusuf)
  - Tawfeeq Al-Suwaidi (three term Iraqi Prime minister, son of Yusuf)
  - Arif Al-Suwaidi (Iraqi Politician and Judge, son of Yusuf)

Al-Pachachi Family

- Muzahim al-Pachachi (Iraqi prime minister)
  - Adnan Al-Pachachi (Iraqi foreign minister and Emirati Minister of state and advisor) son of Muzahim
- Hamdi Al-Pachachi (Iraqi prime minister) brother of Muzahim
- Nadim al-Pachachi (Minister of Economy and Secretary general of OPEC) nephew of Muzahim and Hamdi

Chadirji Family

- Rifat Efendi Chadirji (Mayor of the city of Baghdad during Ottoman rule and democratic reformer in Mandatory Iraq)
  - Kamil Chadirji (Iraqi Social Democrat member of Parliament, minister of economy and founder of the Iraqi National Democratic Party) son of Rifat Efendi
    - Naseer Chadirji (Iraqi Social Democrat, member of the Interim Iraqi Governing Council and General Secretary of the Iraqi National Democratic Party) son of Kamil Chadirji
    - Rifat Chadirji (Iraqi Architect and propagandist) son of Kamil Chaderiji
  - Raouf Chadirji (Iraqi Lawyer and minister of justice) Half brother of Kamil Chadirji

Talabani–Ibrahim Ahmad Family

- Jalal Talabani (Iraqi president)
  - Bafel Talabani (president of the Patriotic Union of Kurdistan) son of Jalal
  - Qubad Talabani (Deputy Prime Minister of Kurdistan) son of Jalal
  - Lahur Talabani (Founder of People's Front) nephew of Jalal
- Ibrahim Ahmad (founder of the Patriotic Union of Kurdistan)
  - Hero Ibrahim Ahmed daughter of Ibrahim and wife of Jalal
  - Shanaz Ibrahim Ahmed (Iraqi First Lady) daughter of Ibrahim
    - Abdul Latif Rashid (Iraqi president) husband of Shanaz

== Ireland ==
The Ahern family

- Bertie Ahern (Fianna Fáil Leader 1994–2008, Taoiseach 1997–2008, TD Dublin Central 1977–2011)
  - his brother Maurice Ahern: Fianna Fáil councillor and former Lord Mayor of Dublin 1999–2009
  - his brother Noel Ahern: Fianna Fáil Minister of State TD Dublin North West 1992–2011

The Blaney family

- Neal Blaney (Fianna Fáil TD 1927–1938 and 1943–1948, Fianna Fáil Senator 1938–1943)
  - Neil Blaney (son of Neal Blaney; Fianna Fáil/IFF TD 1948–1995, IFF MEP Connacht–Ulster 1979–1984, 1989–1994)
  - Harry Blaney (son of Neal Blaney; IFF TD 1997–2002)
    - Niall Blaney (son of Harry Blaney; IFF/Fianna Fáil TD 2002–2011, Senator since 2020)

The Cosgrave family

- W. T. Cosgrave (member of the first Dáil Éireann, President of the Executive Council 1922–1932, Cumann na nGaedheal leader 1922–1934, Fine Gael leader 1934–1944)
  - Liam Cosgrave (son of W. T. Cosgrave; Fine Gael TD 1944–1981, Fine Gael leader 1965–1977, Taoiseach 1973–1977)
    - Liam T. Cosgrave (son of Liam Cosgrave, grandson of W. T. Cosgrave; Fine Gael TD 1981–1987, Senator 1993–2002)

The De Valera family

- Éamon de Valera (President of Dáil Éireann 1919–1922, President of the Executive Council 1927–1932, Taoiseach 1932–1948, 1951–1954, 1957–1959 and President of Ireland 1959–1973)
  - Vivion de Valera (son of Éamon de Valera; Fianna Fáil TD 1945–1981)
    - Síle de Valera (granddaughter of Éamon de Valera; Clare Fianna Fáil TD 1977–2007, Minister for Arts, Heritage, Gaeltacht and the Islands 1997–2002)
    - Éamon Ó Cuív (grandson of Éamon de Valera; former member of Seanad Éireann, Galway West Fianna Fáil TD 1992–2024, Minister for Community, Rural and Gaeltacht Affairs 2002–2011)

The Kitt-Brady family

- Michael F. Kitt (Fianna Fáil TD at intervals, 1948–1975)
  - Michael P. Kitt (son of Michael F. Kitt; TD and Senator, 1975–2016)
  - Tom Kitt (son of Michael F. Kitt; TD 1989–2011)
  - Áine Brady (daughter of Michael F. Kitt; TD 2007–2011)
  - Gerry Brady (Áine Brady's husband; former TD)

The Lemass/Haughey family

- Seán Lemass (Fianna Fáil TD 1924–1969; Fianna Fáil Leader and Taoiseach 1959–1966)
  - Noel Lemass (son of Seán Lemass; Fianna Fáil TD 1956–1976)
    - Eileen Lemass (daughter-in-law of Seán Lemass; Fianna Fáil TD 1977–1981)
  - Charles Haughey (son-in-law of Seán Lemass; Fianna Fáil TD 1957–1992; Fianna Fáil Leader 1979–1992 and Taoiseach 1979–1981, 1982, 1987–1992)
    - Seán Haughey (son of Charles Haughey; Fianna Fáil TD 1992–2011)

The Lenihan family

- Patrick Lenihan (Fianna Fáil TD 1965–1970)
  - Brian Lenihan Snr (son of Patrick Lenihan; Fianna Fáil TD 1961–1996)
  - Mary O'Rourke (née Lenihan) (daughter of Patrick Lenihan; Fianna Fáil TD 1982–2002, 2007–2011)
    - Brian Lenihan Jnr (son of Brian Lenihan; Fianna Fáil TD 1996–2011)
    - Conor Lenihan (son of Brian Lenihan; Fianna Fáil TD 2002–2011)

The O'Malley family

- Donogh O'Malley (Fianna Fáil TD 1954–1968)
  - Desmond O'Malley (nephew of Donogh O'Malley; TD 1968–2002, Fianna Fáil Cabinet Minister and first leader of the Progressive Democrats)
    - Fiona O'Malley (daughter of Desmond O'Malley; Progressive Democrats TD 2002–2007, Senator 2007–2011)
    - Tim O'Malley (cousin of Desmond O'Malley; Progressive Democrats TD 2002–2007)

The Andrews family

- David Andrews (Fianna Fáil TD 1965–2000)
- Niall Andrews (brother of David Andrews; Fianna Fáil TD 1977–1987)
  - Barry Andrews (son of David Andrews; Fianna Fáil TD 2002–2011)
  - Chris Andrews (son of Niall Andrews; Fianna Fáil TD 2002–2011)

The Bruton family

- John Bruton (Fine Gael Taoiseach 1994–1997, TD 1969–2004)
- Richard Bruton (brother of John Bruton; Fine Gael TD 1982–2024, Minister for Communications, Climate Action and Environment 2018–2020, Minister for Education and Skills 2016–2018, Minister for Jobs, Enterprise and Innovation 2011–2016, Deputy Leader of Fine Gael 2002–2010)

The Coveney family

- Hugh Coveney (Fine Gael TD 1981–1982, 1982–1987, 1994–1998, Minister for Defense and Minister for the Marine 1994–1995)
  - Simon Coveney (son of Hugh Coveney; Fine Gael TD 1998–2024, Deputy Leader of Fine Gael 2017–2024, Minister for Defense 2014–2016, Minister for Housing, Planning, Community and Local Government 2016–2017, Minister for Foreign Affairs 2017–2022)

== Israel ==
The Begin family

- Menachem Begin, Prime Minister of Israel, 1977–83
  - Benny Begin, nationalist politician, son of Menachem Begin

The Burg family

- Yosef Burg, party leader, National Religious Party; cabinet minister
  - Avraham Burg, Speaker of the Knesset, 1999–2003, son of Josef Burg

The Dayan family

- Shmuel Dayan, Zionist activist and member of the Knesset 1949–59.
  - Moshe Dayan, IDF Chief of the General Staff; cabinet minister, son of Shmuel Dayan
    - Yael Dayan, Member of the Knesset 1992–2003, daughter of Moshe Dayan.

The Herzog family

- Yitzhak HaLevi Herzog, chief Rabbi in Irland, in Palestine, Ashkenazi chief rabbi of Israel
  - Yaakov Herzog, Irish-born Israeli diplomat, son of Yitzhak Herzog
  - Chaim Herzog, President of Israel (1983–93), son of Yitzhak Herzog
    - Isaac Herzog, Member of the Knesset (2003–2018), President of Israel (since 2021), son of Chaim Herzog
    - Michael Herzog, Israeli Ambassador to the United States (since 2021), son of Chaim Herzog

The Lau family

- Yisrael Meir Lau, Chief Rabbi, 1993–2003
  - David Lau, Chief Rabbi, 2013–present, son of Yisrael Meir
    - Naphtali Lau-Lavie, aide to Moshe Dayan, Diplomat, older brother of Yisrael Meir Lau

The Rabin family

- Yitzhak Rabin, Prime Minister of Israel, 1974–77 and 1992–95
  - Dalia Rabin-Pelossof, Member of the Knesset 1999–2003, daughter of Yitzhak Rabin

The Sharon family

- Ariel Sharon, Prime Minister of Israel, 2001–06
  - Omri Sharon, Member of the Knesset, 2003–06, son of Ariel Sharon

The Weizman family

- Haim Weizman, President of Israel, 1949–52
  - Ezer Weizman, President of Israel, 1993–2000, nephew of Haim Weizman

The Yosef family

- Ovadia Yosef, Chief Rabbi, 1973–83
  - Yitzhak Yosef, Chief Rabbi, 2013–present, son of Ovadia
  - Shlomo Amar, Chief Rabbi, 2003–13, chief rabbi of Jerusalem, 2014–present, daughter married the son of Yitzchak Yosef
  - Yehuda Deri, Chief rabbi of Be'er Sheva, 1997–present, son is married to the daughter of Yitzhak Yosef

== Italy ==
The Berlinguer family

- Mario Berlinguer (father of Enrico Berlinguer, Sr.; Member of the Italian Camera dei deputati)
  - Enrico Berlinguer (son of Mario Berlinguer; leader, Italian Communist Party)
  - Giovanni Berlinguer (son of Mario Berlinguer; Member of the European Parliament)
  - Luigi Berlinguer (cousin of Enrico and Giovanni Berlinguer; Italian Minister of university and Education)
  - Francesco Cossiga (cousin of Enrico and Giovanni Berlinguer; President of the Italian Republic, 1985–92; Prime Minister of Italy, 1979–80)
- Antonio Segni (distant relative; President of the Italian Republic, 1962–64; Prime Minister of Italy, 1955–57 and 1959–60)
  - Mariotto Segni (son of Antonio Segni; Member of the Italian Camera dei deputati)

The Craxi family

- Bettino Craxi (Prime Minister of Italy, 1983–87)
  - Bobo Craxi (son of Bettino Craxi; former leader of the New Italian Socialist Party, then leader of The Italian Socialists now merged in the Socialist Party)
  - Stefania Craxi (daughter of Bettino Craxi; Member of the Italian Camera dei deputati for the People of Freedom)

The Mussolini family

- Benito Mussolini (Prime Minister of Italy, 1922–43)
  - Alessandra Mussolini (granddaughter of Benito Mussolini; former Member of the European Parliament, Member of the Italian Camera dei deputati)
  - Caio Giulio Cesare Mussolini (great-grandson of Benito Mussolini; MEP candidate for Brothers of Italy)
  - Galeazzo Ciano (son-in-law of Benito Mussolini; Minister of Foreign Affairs, 1936–1943)
  - Rachele Mussolini (granddaughter of Benito Mussolini; councillor in Rome)

== Jamaica ==
The Charles family

- Pearnel Charles
- Pearnel Patroe Charles Jr.
- Patrece Charles-Freeman
- Michelle Charles

The Holness family

- Andrew Holness (Prime Minister of Jamaica, 2011–12, 2016 to present)
- Juliet Holness (wife of Andrew Holness, MP)

The Manley family

- Norman Manley (Prime Minister of Jamaica, 1959–62)
- Edna Manley (wife of Norman Manley; political activist and writer)
  - Douglas Manley (son of Norman and Edna Manley; Member of Parliament)
  - Michael Manley (son of Norman and Edna Manley; Prime Minister of Jamaica, 1972–80 and 1989–92)
- Sir Alexander Bustamante (cousin of Norman Manley; Prime Minister of Jamaica, 1962–67)
- Hugh Shearer (cousin of Michael Manley; Prime Minister of Jamaica, 1967–72)

The Smith family

- Ernie Smith (MP, 2002–2011)
- Marsha Smith (daughter of Ernie; MP, 2020 to present)

The Vaz family

- Daryl Vaz
- Ann-Marie Vaz

== Japan ==
The Fukuda family

- Takeo Fukuda, Prime Minister (1976–78)
  - Yasuo Fukuda, Prime Minister (2007–08)

The Hatoyama family

- Hatoyama Kazuo (Speaker of the House of Representatives: 1896–97)
  - Ichiro Hatoyama (Prime Minister: 1954–56)
    - Iichiro Hatoyama, Minister of Foreign Affairs (1976–77)
      - Yukio Hatoyama, Prime Minister (2009–10)
      - Kunio Hatoyama, Minister of Education (1991–92), Minister of Justice (2007–08)

The Okawa–Miyazawa family

- Okawa Heikichi (Minister of Justice: 1925; Minister of Railways: 1927–29)
  - Okawa, m. Miyazawa Hiroshi (Member of the House of Representatives: 1928–52)
    - Miyazawa Kiichi (Prime Minister: 1991–93; Deputy Prime Minister: 1987–88; Minister of Finance: 1986–88, 1998–2001; Minister of Foreign Affairs: 1974–76; Minister of Trade and Industry: 1970–73)
    - Hiroshi Miyazawa (Governor of Hiroshima: 1973–1981; Minister of Justice: 1995–96)
      - Yoichi Miyazawa (Minister of Economy, Trade and Industry: 2014–15)

The Ōkubo–Yoshida–Suzuki–Asō family

- Ōkubo Toshimichi. One of the Three Great Founders of Meiji Japan. Minister of Finance 1871–73, Home Minister 1874–78
  - Makino Nobuaki (born Ōkubo Nobuaki), Minister of Foreign Affairs 1913–14, Lord Keeper of the Privy Seal of Japan 1925–1935), m. Mishima Mineko, daughter of Mishima Michitsune (Governor of Yamaguchi (1879–1882), Fukushima (1882–1884) and Tochigi (1883–1885) prefectures)
    - Yukiko, m. Shigeru Yoshida (Minister of Foreign Affairs 1945–47, 1948–52; Prime Minister: 1946–47. 1948–54)
      - Kazuko, m. Takakichi Asō
        - Tarō Asō (Minister of Foreign Affairs 2005–07; Prime Minister 2008–09; Deputy Prime Minister and Minister of Finance 2012– ), m. Suzuki Chikako, daughter of Zenkō Suzuki (Minister of Agriculture and Forestry 1976–77; Prime Minister: 1980–82)
  - Yoshiko, m. Ijuin Hikokichi (Minister of Foreign Affairs 1923–24)

The Satō–Kishi–Abe family

- Satō Hidesuke
  - Ichirō Satō, vice admiral in the Imperial Japanese Navy.
  - Nobusuke Kishi (born Nobusuke Satō), (Prime Minister: 1957–60, Minister of Foreign Affairs: 1956–1957)
    - Yoko, m. Shintaro Abe (Minister of Foreign Affairs 1982–86), son of Kan Abe (Member of the House of Representatives 1937–1946)
      - Shinzō Abe, Prime Minister (2006–07, 2012–2020)
      - Nobuo Kishi, (Member of the House of Councillors 2004–2012; Member of the House of Representatives 2012-; Minister of Defense 2020-)
  - Sato Eisaku, Prime Minister (1964–72)

The Koizumi family

- Matajiro Koizumi, (Minister of Posts and Telecommunications 1929–1931)
  - Yoshie, m. Junya Koizumi (born Samejima), Director General of the Japan Defense Agency
    - Junichiro Koizumi, Prime Minister (2001–06)
      - Shinjirō Koizumi (Minister of Defense (2025); Minister of Environment (2019); Member of the House of Representatives)

The Konoe–Hosokawa family

- Konoe Atsumaro (President of the House of Peers: 1896–1903)
  - Fumimaro Konoe (President of the House of Peers 1933–37, Minister of Foreign Affairs 1938, Prime Minister: 1937–39, 1940–41)
    - Yoshiko, m. Morisada Hosokawa
      - Morihiro Hosokawa, Prime Minister of Japan (1993–94)

The Nakasone family (father-son)

- Yasuhiro Nakasone, Prime Minister (1982–87)
  - Hirofumi Nakasone, Minister of Foreign Affairs (2008–09)

The Saigō–Ōyama family

- Saigō Takamitsu
  - Ōyama Tsunamasa (born Saigō), m. Ōyama Keiko
    - Ōyama Iwao (Genrō: 1912–1916; Superintendent-General of the National Police: 1879–80; Army Minister: 1885–91, 1892–96; Lord Keeper of the Privy Seal: 1915–16)
      - Ōyama Kashiwa (Member of the House of Peers: 1916–47)
  - Saigō Kichibe
    - Saigō Takamori (One of the Three Great Founders of Meiji Japan; Minister-Councillor: 1870–1873; acting Head of Government: 1871–1873)
      - Saigō Toratarō (Member of the House of Peers: 1902–1919)
        - Saigō Kichinosuke (Minister of Justice: 1968–70; Member of the House of Councillors: 1947–73; Member of the House of Peers: 1936–1947)
    - Saigō Jūdō (Tsugumichi) (Genrō: 1892–1902; Home Minister: 1890–91, 1898–1900; Navy Minister: 1885–90, 1893–98; Minister of Agriculture and Commerce: 1881–84; War Minister: 1878–80; Minister of Education: 1878)
      - Saigō Jūtoku (Member of the House of Peers: 1902–1946)

The Tanaka family

- Kakuei Tanaka, Prime Minister of Japan (1972–74)
  - Makiko Tanaka, Minister of Foreign Affairs (2001–02): Minister of Education, Culture, Sports, Science and Technology (2012)

The Obuchi family

- Keizō Obuchi, Prime Minister of Japan (1998–2000)
  - Yūko Obuchi, Minister of Economy, Trade and Industry (2014)

== Jordan ==
The Al-Fayez family

- H.G Mithqal Al-Fayez
  - H.E Trad Al-Fayez (Minister of Agriculture, Ambassador, Senator)
  - H.E Akef Al-Fayez (Served as Minister in 10 different governments, Speaker of the Jordanian Parliament, Senator)
    - H.E Faisal Al-Fayez (Prime Minister of Jordan, Speaker of the House of Representatives, President of the Senate)
- H.E Amer Al-Fayez (Chief of Royal Protocol, Ministerial rank)
- H.E Eid Al-Fayez (Served as minister in 5 different governments)
- H.E Nayef Al-Fayez (Minister of Tourism, Environment)
- H.E Nayef Hayel Al-Fayez (Minister of Health, MP)

The Majali family

- Premier Hazza' al-Majali (1917–1960), Prime Minister of Jordan
  - H.E Ayman Hazza' Al-Majali (21st Century), Deputy Prime Minister of Jordan
  - H.E Hussein Hazza' Al-Majali (2010–present), Minister of Internal affairs Ex-Commandant of Jordanian Public Security Forces
- Field Marshal Habis Al-Majali (1914–2001), Jordanian Chief of Staff
- Premier Abdelsalam al-Majali (1925–2023), Prime Minister of Jordan
- Abdul Hadi Al-Majali (1997–2009), Speaker of the Jordanian Parliament.(1996), Minister of Public Works and Housing.
- Sahel Al-Majali (2007–2009), Minister of Public Works and Housing.(2009), Minister of Transport.

The Al-Rifai family

- Samir al-Rifai (Prime Minister, 1944–45, 1947, 1950–51, 1956, 1958–59, 1963)
  - Zaid al-Rifai (son; Prime Minister, 1973–76, 1985–89)
    - Samir Rifai (son of Zaid al-Rifai; Prime Minister, 2009–11)
- Abdelmunem Rifai (Prime Minister, 1969–70)

The Badran brothers

- Mudar Badran (Prime Minister of Jordan, 1976–79, 1980–84, and 1989–91)
- Adnan Badran (Prime Minister of Jordan, 2005–06)

The Lawzi family (father-son)

- Ahmed Al-Lawzi Prime Minister
  - Nasir Al-Lawzi (Minister of Transportation, Minister of Information)

== Kazakhstan ==
The Jandosov family (founder-son-nephew)

- Uraz Kikimovitch Jandosov
  - Sanjar Urazovitch Jandosov
  - Ali Urazovitch Jandosov
    - Oraz Jandosov

The Nazarbayev family (father-daughter)

- Nursultan Nazarbayev (President of Kazakhstan from 1990 to 2019)
  - Dariga Nazarbayeva (Kazakhstan's ambassador to Russia, business oligarch, wife of Deputy Foreign Minister Rakhat Aliyev and possible successor to her father)

== Kosovo ==
The Sejdiu family

- Fatmir Sejdiu (President, 2006–2010)
  - Pleurat Sejdiu (Minister of Health, Secretary of Health)
  - Shefki Sejdiu (Member of Parliament)
  - Korab Sejdiu (Member of Parliament)

The Rugova family

- Ibrahim Rugova (President, 2000–2006)
  - Uke Rugova (Member of Parliament)
  - Naser Rugova (Member of Parliament)
  - Teuta Rugova (Member of Parliament)

The Haradinaj family

- Ramush Haradinaj (Prime-minister, 2006) (Member of Parliament)
  - Daut Haradinaj (Member of Parliament)

== Kenya ==
The Kenyatta family

- Jomo Kenyatta (President, 1964–78)
  - Margaret Kenyatta (daughter of Jomo Kenyatta; Mayor of Nairobi)
  - Uhuru Kenyatta (son of Jomo Kenyatta; Finance Minister, President (2013–present)

The Moi family

- Daniel arap Moi (President, 1978–2002)
  - Gideon Moi (son of Daniel arap Moi; Member of Parliament)
  - Raymond Moi (son of Daniel arap Moi; former Member of Parliament)

The Odinga family

- Oginga Odinga (Vice President of Kenya)
  - Raila Odinga (son of Oginga Odinga; Prime Minister)
  - Oburu Odinga (son of Oginga Odinga, Member of Parliament)
  - Gor Sunguh (Odinga's relative through marriage to Raila Odinga's niece)

The Nyagah family

- Jeremiah Nyagah (long-time serving cabinet minister 1963–93 and Member of Parliament 1958–92)
  - Norman Nyagah (son of Jeremiah Nyagah Government Chief Whip and Member of Parliament)
    - Jeremiah Jerry Mwaniki Nyagah son of Norman Nyagah, and President of the Kenya Youth Coalition Network International KYCNI, based in Atlanta Georgia USA.
  - Joseph Nyagah (son of Jeremiah Nyagah and also Member of Parliament)
  - Nahashon Nyagah (son of Jeremiah Nyagah and former governor of the Central Bank of Kenya)
  - Mary Khimulu (daughter of Jeremiah Nyagah and ambassador UNEP to France)

The Awori family (Kenya and Uganda)

- Moody Awori former vice president.
- Aggrey Awori, formerly Member of Parliament and Minister in Uganda.

== Kiribati ==
The Tong family

- Anote Tong (President of Kiribati, 2003–2016)
  - Harry Tong (brother of Anote Tong; leader, National Progressive Party)

== Korea, North ==
The Kim family (1948–present)

- Kim Il Sung (Leader of North Korea, 1948–1994), founder of North Korea
  - Kim Jong Il (Leader of North Korea, 1994–2011), son of Kim Il Sung
    - Kim Jong Un (Leader of North Korea, 2011–present), grandson of Kim Il Sung

Other members of Kim family

- Kim Jong-nam (first son of Kim Jong Il)
- Kim Jong-chul (second son of Kim Jong Il)
- Kim Yo-jong (youngest daughter of Kim Jong Il; deputy director of the Propaganda and Agitation Department of the Workers' Party of Korea)

Other non-bloodline members of Kim family

- Ko Yong-hui (first lady of Kim Jong Il)
- Ri Sol-ju (first lady of Kim Jong Un)
- Jang Song-thaek (brother-in-law of Kim Jong Il; "number-two-man in North Korea" )

== Korea, South ==
The Park family (1963–2017)

- Park Chung-hee (President of the Republic of Korea, 1963–1979)
- Park Geun-hye (President of the Republic of Korea, 2013–2017), daughter of Park Chung-hee.

== Kyrgyzstan ==
The Akayev family (father-daughter)

- Askar Akayev (President) 1990–2005
  - Mariam Akayeva (politician)

The Bakiyev brothers

- Kurmanbek Bakiyev (President of Kyrgyzstan)
- Janysh Bakiyev (former First Deputy Chairman of the National Security Service)
- Marat Bakiyev (Kyrgyzstan's Ambassador to Germany)
- Adil Bakiyev (Kyrgyz government official within the Kyrgyz embassy in China)
- Akhmat Bakiyev (Kyrgyz politician and business oligarch)
- Kanybek Bakiev (Head of a village council)
- Jusupbek Bakiev (former deputy director of Kyrgyzstan's Agency for Community Development and Investment)

== Latvia ==
The Ulmanis family

- Kārlis Ulmanis (President of Latvia, 1936–40)
  - Guntis Ulmanis (great-nephew of Kārlis Ulmanis; President of Latvia, 1993–99)

The Kalniņš family

- Pauls Kalniņš (Speaker of the Saeima, 1925–1934)
  - Klāra Kalniņa (wife of Pauls Kalniņš; Deputy of the Constitutional Assembly of Latvia, 1920–1922)
  - Brūno Kalniņš (son of Pauls Kalniņš; Deputy of the Constitutional Assembly of Latvia, 1920–1922, Deputy of the Saeima, 1922–1934)

== Laos ==
The Siphandone family

- Khamtai Siphandone, President (1998–2006)
  - Sonexay Siphandone, son, Prime Minister (2022)
  - Viengthong Siphandone, daughter, Vice President (2026)

== Lebanon ==
El Assaad family

- Nasif Al Nassar - ruler of Jabal Amel from the Al-Saghir Dynasty.
- Ali Al Saghir - a powerful leader of Jabal Amel.
- Khalil Bek El Assaad - appointed Ottoman Governor of Nablus, Al Balqa, Marjayoun, Tyre and Homs.
- Shbib Pasha El Assaad - minister of the Ottoman Empire, army leader.
  - Ali Nasrat El Assaad - advisor of the Court and a Superior in the Ministry of Foreign affairs in the Ottoman Empire.
- Kamil Bey (Esad) El-Assaad - representative of the Ottoman Empire in Beyrut.
  - Ahmed El Assaad - 3rd Legislative Speaker of Lebanon.
    - Kamel Bek El Assaad- 5th Legislative Speaker of Lebanon, Minister of Education, Minister of Water and Electricity, founder of Democratic Socialist Party (Lebanon).
      - Ahmad Kamel El Assaad - Lebanese Option Party founder, political candidate.
- Moustafa Nassar Bek El Assaad - Supreme Court President.
- Nael El Assaad - envoy for HM King Abdullah of Jordan and former husband of late Saudi magnate Adnan Khashoggi's sister Soheir.
- Said El Assaad - former Lebanese Ambassador of Switzerland, France and Belgium and a former Member of Parliament.
  - Bahija Al Solh El Assaad - wife of Said El Assaad, daughter of Prime Minister Riad Al Solh, aunt of Waleed Bin Talal.
- Nasrat El Assaad - ambassador of Lebanon to numerous countries.
- Haidar El Assaad - historian and among the first official delegates to visit the new People's Republic of China in the 1960s following Ministerial civil service – later serving as a director at the FAO of the United Nations and consultant to TRW and the World Bank.

Abou Fadel family

- Mounir Abou Fadel – Deputy Speaker of the Parliament
  - Marwan Abou Fadel – Co-founder of the Lebanese Democratic Party, son of Mounir

Al Khalil family

- Kazem Al Khalil – Lebanese Parliamentarian, seven time minister, leading Shia feudal zu'ama dynasty of Tyr, Southern Lebanon
  - Khalil Al Khalil - son of Kazem Al Khalil, served as Ambassador to the Imperial State of Iran from 1971 to 1978, personal friend to the Shah of Iran and ambassador to the Pahlavi Court.
  - Maha Al Khalil Chalabi daughter of Kazem Al Khalil, a UNESCO goodwill ambassador involved in the preservation of archeological sites in Tyr through the 'Fondation de Tyr'. Married to Talal Chalabi, brother of Ahmed Chalabi- the founder of the Iraqi National Congress (INC) and the 37th Prime Minister of Iraq.

Arslan family

- Emir Majid Arslan II – Lebanese independence hero and Druze leader.
  - Emir Faysal Arslan – son of Emir Majid and Head of the House of Arslan from 1983 until 1989 (In conjunction with Emirah Khawla Majid Arslan).
  - Emir Talal Arslan – son of Emir Majid, Druze leader and current Head of the House of Arslan.
- Emir Shakib Arslan – Influential Arab politician, writer, poet and historian.

Chamoun family (father-sons-granddaughter)

- Camille Chamoun – President, 1952–58
  - Dany Chamoun – Militia leader and political party leader; son of Camille
    - Tracy Chamoun – Author and human rights activist; daughter of Dany
  - Dory Chamoun – Political party leader; son of Camille

Eddé family

- Émile Eddé – President during the French Mandate
  - Raymond Eddé – political party leader; son of Émile
    - Carlos Eddé – opposition politician; nephew of Raymond
      - Michel Eddé – Minister

Karam family

- Youssef Bey Karam – Lebanese Maronite notable who fought in the 1860 civil war and led a rebellion in 1866–1867 against the Ottoman Empire rule in Mount Lebanon
- Youssef Salim Karam – former MP from Zgharta
  - Salim Bey Karam – Current MP and former minister, son of Youssef Salim Karam

El Khazen family

- Wadih Nemr El Khazen – Lebanese Minister
  - Wadih Nemr El Khazen – President of the Central Maronite Council
- Farid Elias El Khazen – Lebanese Member of Parliament
  - Farid Haikal El Khazen – Lebanese Minister
    - Joseph Dergham El Khazen – Maronite Patriarch
      - Joseph Ragi El Khazen – Maronite Patriarch
      - Tobias El Khazen – Maronite Patriarch

Mikati family

- Taha Mikati – Businessman; brother of Najib
  - Azmi Mikati – Businessman; son of Taha
- Najib Mikati – Prime minister of Lebanon; brother of Taha

Gemmayel family (father-sons-grandsons)

- Pierre Gemayel – Kataeb Party founder
  - Bachir Gemayel – President-elect, 1982; son of Pierre (assassinated before taking office)
    - Nadim Gemayel – Political activist; son of Bachir
  - Amine Gemayel – President, 1982–88; son of Pierre
    - Pierre Amine Gemayel – legislator; son of Amine
    - Sami Gemayel – Political activist; legislator; son of Amine

Hariri family

- Rafic Hariri – 30th Prime Minister
  - Saad Hariri – 33rd Prime Minister; son of Rafic Hariri
  - Bahaa Hariri – Political Activist; Parliament Candidate
- Bahia Hariri – legislator; sister of Rafic
  - Ahmad Hariri – Parliamentary candidate; son of Bahia

Al Solh family (Married into the House of Saud)

- Sami al Solh – 3rd Prime Minister
- Adel Al Solh – Politician; Cousin of Sami al Solh
- Riad Al Solh – 1st Prime Minister; Grandfather of Al Waleed bin Talal Al Saud
  - Leila Al Solh – Minister of Industry; Daughter of Riad al Solh
  - Bahija Al Solh El Assaad - wife of Said El Assaad, daughter of Riad Al Solh, aunt of Waleed Bin Talal.
- Takieddine Solh – 15th Prime Minister; Brother of Kazem Solh
- Kazem Al Solh – Diplomat; Member of Parliament
- Kamel Ahmad Basha el Solh – High judge in the Ottoman Imperial Court
  - Afif al Solh – Parliament member of Syria
- Rachid Al Solh – 16th Prime Minister of Lebanon
- Waheed Al Solh – Activist; Politician; First cousin and husband of Mounira Al solh
- Mounira Al Solh – Political Activist; Parliament Candidate; First cousin and wife of Waheed Al solh
  - Sana Al Solh – Political Activist

Helou family

- Charles Helou – President (1964–70)
- Nina Helou – First Lady
- Pierre Helou – Cabinet Minister;
  - Henry Helou – legislator; son of Pierre

Jumblatt family (father-son)

- Kamal Jumblatt – founder, Progressive Socialist Party, Cabinet Minister
  - Walid Jumblatt – Civil War militia leader; Cabinet Minister; son of Kamal
    - Taymour Jumblatt – Member of Parliament; son of Walid

Karami family (father-sons)

- Abdul Hamid Karami (Prime Minister of Lebanon)
  - Rashid Karami – Prime Minister older son of Abdul Hamid
  - Omar Karami – Prime Minister younger son of Abdul Hamid.
    - Faisal Karami – Member of Parliament; son of Omar

Hobeika Family (husband-wife and child)

- Elie Hobeika – Member of Parliament and malitia leader
- Gina Hobeika – Former Party leader; Wife of Elie Hobeika
  - Joseph Hobeika – Party leader

Lahoud family

- Salim Lahoud – Member of Parliament (1952, 1956, 1960, 1968), Minister (Defense, Foreign affairs).
  - Nassib Lahoud – Member of Parliament (1991, 1992, 1996, 2000), Cabinet Minister (State, 2008), President of the Democratic Renewal Movement (son of Salim).
- Fouad Lahoud – Member of Parliament (1972) (cousin of Jamil, brother of Salim).
- Jamil Lahoud – Member of Parliament (1964) and Chief of the Army (cousin of Salim, Fouad).
  - Émile Lahoud – President of Lebanon and Chief of the Army (son of Jamil).
    - Emile Emile Lahoud- Minister (Youth and Sports) and Member of Parliament 2000 (elder son of Emile Jamil).
  - Nasri Lahoud – Head of the High Legal Magistrate, Military Judge (son of Jamil).

Moawad family (husband-wife)

- René Moawad – President (1989)
- Nayla Moawad – legislator; widow of René
  - Michel Moawad – Parliament member

Frangieh family

- Suleiman Frangieh – President (1970–76)
  - Tony Frangieh – Cabinet Minister, Civil War militia leader; son of Suleiman
    - Suleiman Frangieh, Jr. – legislator and Minister; son of Tony

Salam family

- Salim Ali Salam – held many local offices in Beirut
  - Anbara Salam Khalidi – feminist activist; daughter of Salim
  - Saeb Salam – 8th Prime Minister of Lebanon; son of Salim
    - Tammam Salam – 49th Prime Minister of Lebanon and acting president of Lebanon; son of Seab

Skaff family

- Joseph Skaff – held several ministerial positions
  - Elias Skaff – Parliament member; married to Myriam Skaff

El Zein family

- Youssef Bek El Zein – land owner, politician, former Member of the Lebanese Parliament
  - Abdul Latif El Zein – former Member of the Lebanese Parliament; son of Youssef
  - Abdul Majeed El Zein – retired officer, former Member of the Lebanese Parliament; son of Youssef
  - Abdul Karim Youssef El Zein – soldier, former Member of the Lebanese Parliament; son of Youssef
- Sheikh Abdel-Karim El Zein- cleric, poet, writer and land owner
- Sheikh Ahmad Aref El Zein - Founder of Al-Irfan magazine, political activist
  - Sheikh Ali El Zein - Historian, writer and activist; son of Sheikh Abdel-Karim El Zein
    - Dr. Hassan El Zein - Author; son of Sheikh Ali El Zein
      - Jehad El Zein - political commentator, current writer in An-nahar newspaper; son of Dr. Hassan El Zein
      - Abbas El Zein - Professor and writer; son of Dr. Hassan El Zein
      - Hekmat El Zein - Previous editor in chief of Hurriyat magazine and human rights activist; son of Dr. Hassan El Zein

== Liberia ==
The Barclay-Tubman family

- Arthur Barclay (President, 1904–12)
  - Edwin Barclay (nephew, President, 1930–44)
    - William Tubman (son-in-law, President, 1944–71)
      - Winston Tubman (nephew, Justice Minister)

The Tolbert family

- William Tolbert (President, 1971-1980)
  - Adolphus B. Tolbert (Son, House Representative)
- Stephen A. Tolbert (Brother, Finance Minister, 1972-1975)

Brumskine family (father-daughter)

- Charles Brumskine (Speaker, 1951–2019)
  - Charlyne Brumskine (Candidate for vice-president)

Skivring Smith family (father-son)

- James Skivring Smith (President, 1871–72)
  - James Skivring Smith, Jr. (Vice President, 1930–44)

The Taylor family

- Charles Taylor (President, 1997–2003)
- Jewel Taylor (Ex-wife, Senator 2006–present, Vice President 2018–present)

== Lithuania ==
- Landsbergis / Jablonskis
- Maldeikis
- Paleckis
- Karbauskis

== Madagascar ==
The Ratsiraka family (uncle-nephew)

- Didier Ratsiraka (President of Madagascar)
  - Roland Ratsiraka (Mayor of Toamasina)

The Sylla family (father-son)

- Albert Sylla (Foreign Minister)
  - Jacques Sylla (Prime Minister)

The Tsiranana family (father-son)

- Philibert Tsiranana (President of Madagascar)
  - Pierre Tsiranana (Governor of Mahajanga)

== Malawi ==
The Chirwa family

- Orton Chirwa (founder, Malawi Congress Party; political prisoner)
- Vera Chirwa (wife of Orton Chirwa; human rights advocate and former presidential candidate)

The Mutharika family

- Bingu wa Mutharika (President of Malawi)
  - Peter Mutharika (young brother of Bingu wa Mutharika; President of Malawi)

== Malaysia ==
The Abdul Razak–Hussein Onn family

- Tun Abdul Razak, Prime Minister of Malaysia (1970–76)
  - Rahah Noah, daughter of Mohamed Noah Omar, sister of Suhailah Noah and spouse of Tun Abdul Razak
  - Dato' Sri Mohd Najib Tun Abdul Razak, Prime Minister (2009–18)
- Jaafar Muhammad, first Menteri Besar of Johor
  - Onn Jaafar, founder of United Malays National Organisation (UMNO) and Menteri Besar of Johor
    - Tun Hussein Onn (Prime Minister, 1976–81)
    - Mohamed Noah Omar, father in law of Abdul Razak as well as Hussein Onn and Speaker of the Dewan Rakyat
    - Suhailah Noah, daughter of Mohamed Noah Omar, spouse of Tun Hussein Onn and sister of Rahah Noah
      - Hishammuddin Hussein, former Minister of Youth of Sports, former Minister of Defence, former Minister of Home Affairs, former Minister of Education and former Minister of Foreign Affairs, son of Hussein Onn
      - Tengku Marsilla Tengku Abdullah, spouse of Hishammuddin Hussein and princess of Pahang
      - Onn Hafiz Ghazi, nephew of Hishammuddin Hussein, Menteri Besar of Johor, former Member of the Johor State Executive Council (EXCO), Member of the Johor State Legislative Assembly (MLA) for Machap and formerly Layang-Layang
  - Abdul Rahman Mohamed Yassin, brother-in-law of Onn Jaafar and first President of the Dewan Negara
  - Ungku Abdul Aziz, nephew of Onn Jaafar, Vice-Chancellor of the University of Malaya and 1st Director of Dewan Bahasa dan Pustaka
  - Syed Hussein Alatas, nephew of Onn Jaafar and Vice-Chancellor of the University of Malaya
  - Syed Muhammad Naquib al-Attas, nephew of Onn Jaafar and founder of the International Institute of Islamic Thought and Civilisation (ISTAC)
  - Abdullah Jaafar, Menteri Besar of Johor
  - Mustapha Jaafar, Menteri Besar of Johor

The Mahathir–Hasmah family

- Mahathir Mohamad, Prime Minister of Malaysia (1981–2003, 2018–2020)
  - Mukhriz Mahathir, Menteri Besar of Kedah (2013–2016, 2018–2020)
- Siti Hasmah, spouse of Mahathir Mohamad
- Tun Ismail Mohamad Ali, brother of Siti Hasmah, second Governor of Bank Negara Malaysia

The Anwar family

- Ibrahim Abdul Rahman, father of Anwar Ibrahim, Member of Parliament of Seberang Perai Central (1959–1969)
  - Anwar Ibrahim, Prime Minister of Malaysia (since 2022), Leader of the Opposition (2008–2015 & 2020–2022), Deputy Prime Minister of Malaysia (1992–1998)
  - Wan Azizah Wan Ismail, Leader of the Opposition (2008 & 2015–2018), Deputy Prime Minister of Malaysia (2018–2020)
    - Nurul Izzah Anwar, daughter of Anwar and Azizah, Member of Parliament of Permatang Pauh (2018–2022)

The Lim family

- Lim Kit Siang, Leader of the Opposition
  - Lim Guan Eng, Minister of Finance (2018–2020), Chief Minister of Penang (2008–2018)
  - Lim Hui Ying, Deputy Minister of Education (2022–2023), Deputy Minister Of Finance (since 2023)
  - Betty Chew Gek Cheng, spouse of Lim Guan Eng

== Maldives ==
The Gayoom family (husband-wife and their close relatives)

- Abdul Gayoom Ibrahim (7th Attorney General of the Maldives 1950–1951)
  - Maumoon Abdul Gayoom (President of the Maldives 1978–2008, son of Abdul Gayoom)
    - Nasreena Ibrahim (First Lady, wife of Maumoon)
      - Ilyas Ibrahim (Minister of Transportation and Aviation, brother of Nasreena)
      - Abbas Ibrahim (Speaker of the People's Majlis, brother of Nasreena)
      - Ibrahim Hussain Maniku (Minister of Information, brother-in-law of Nasreena)
    - Dunya Maumoon (Minister of Foreign Affairs 2013–2016, daughter of Maumoon)
    - Yumna Maumoon (Minister of Arts, Culture, and Heritage 2018–2023)
    - Ahmed Faris Maumoon (Member of the People's Majlis 2015–2019, son of Maumoon)
    - Mohamed Ghassan Maumoon (Minister of Defence 2023–, son of Maumoon)
  - Abdulla Yameen (President 2013–2018, son of Abdul Gayoom Ibrahim)
    - Fathimath Ibrahim (First Lady, wife of Yameen)
    - Zeine Abdulla Yameen (founder of the People's National Front, son of Yameen)
  - Abdulla Hameed (Speaker of Parliament and minister, son of Abdul Gayoom Ibrahim, brother of Maumoom, half-brother of Yameen)
    - Hamdhoon Hameed (Minister of Planning)
    - Hala Hameed (diplomat)
  - Sakeena Abdul Gayoom (daughter of Abdul Gayoom)
    - Midhath Hilmy (Minister of Science and Communications, son of Sakeena)
  - Abdulla Majeed (Deputy Minister for the Environment, son of Abdul Gayoom)
- Moomina Abdul Gayoom (researcher)

== Mali ==
The Sidibé brothers

- Mandé Sidibé (Prime Minister, 2000–02)
- Modibo Sidibé (Prime Minister, 2007–11)

== Malta ==
The Abela family

- George Abela (President of Malta, 2009–14)
  - Robert Abela (son) (Prime Minister of Malta. 2020–present)

The Borg Olivier family

A family steeped in politics for over 100 years.

- Giuseppe Borg Olivier, Chief Justice (1814);
- Salvatore Borg Olivier, Speaker of the Legislative Assembly, 1923-1927; Member of the Maltese Senate, 1927-1933; Cabinet Minister Partit Nazzjonalista
- George Borg Olivier (Prime Minister of Malta, 1950–1955, 1962–1971) leader of Partit Nazzjonalista,1950-1977; Member of Parliament (1939-1980); Architect of Malta’s Statehood, achieving Independence from Great Britain (1964).
  - Alexander Borg Olivier (son of George Borg Olivier), Diplomat - Malta’s Ambassador to the United Nations.
- Gaetano Borg Olivier, twice elected Member of Parliament; 1953, 1962 Partit Nazzjonalista;
- Paolo Borg Olivier, Minister for Health, 1962-1966; Minister for Education, Culture and Tourism, 1966-1971; Member of Parliament 1962-1981 Partit Nazzjonalista
- Albert Borg Olivier de Puget, Member of Parliament, 1966-1981; Magistrate in the Courts of Malta; Malta’s Diplomatic Ambassador to France and the United States of America; Partit Nazzjonalista
- Paul Borg Olivier; Mayor of Valletta (1999-2008); Secretary General of Partit Nazzjonalista 2008–2013)

The Debono Grech family

- Joe Debono Grech (Deputy Leader of Partit Laburista, 1987–1992)
  - Joanne Debono Grech (Daughter of Joe Debono Grech, Mayor of Birkirkara, 2013–present)

The Fenech Adami family

- Eddie Fenech Adami (Prime Minister of Malta, 1987–1996, 1998–2004 President of Malta, 2004–2009 Nationalist Party leader 1977–2004); Architect of Malta’s entry into the European Union (2004).
  - Beppe Fenech Adami (son of Eddie Fenech Adami, Nationalist Party deputy leader 2013–2017)
  - Micheal Fenech Adami (son of Eddie Fenech Adami, Mayor of Birkirkara, 2006–2013)

The Delia family

- Adrian Delia (Leader of Partit Nazzjonalista, 2017–2020)
- Anthony Delia (Brother of Adrian Delia, Local Councillor of San Pawl il-Bahar, 2019–present)

The Galea-Muscat family

- Censu Galea (Minister of Food, Agriculture and Fisheries, 1994–1996, Minister of Transport and Telecommunications, 1998–2004, Deputy Speaker of Parliament, 2010–2017)
  - Graziella Galea (daughter of Censu Galea, Member of Parliament, 2022–present)
    - Joseph Muscat (distant relative of Graziella Galea, Prime Minister of Malta,2013-2020)

The Gonzi family

- Mikiel Gonzi (Archbishop of Malta, 1943–1976, Labour Party Senator 1921–1924)
  - Lawrence Gonzi (great-grandnephew of Mikiel Gonzi, Prime Minister of Malta, 2004–2013). Piloting Malta’s entry into the Euro Zone(2008). Speaker of Parliament, 1987-1996; Leader of Partit Nazzjonalista 2004-2013;
  - Michael Gonzi (great-grandnephew of Mikiel Gonzi and brother of Lawrence Gonzi, Member of Parliament, 2008–2017)Partit Nazzjonalista

The Grech family

- Edwin Grech (Minister of Social Security, 1996–1998)
  - Karin Grech (Daughter of Edwin Grech, Murdered in 1977 by a letter bomb)
  - Bernard Grech (Nephew of Edwin Grech, Leader of Partit Nazzjonalista, 2020–present)

The De Marco family

- Guido de Marco President of Malta, 1999–2004; Deputy Prime Minister of Malta 1987-1999; Deputy Leader of Partit Nazzjonalista 1977-1999; President of the United Nations General Assembly, 1990;
  - Mario de Marco (son of Guido de Marco, Minister for Environment, Tourism and Culture, 2012–2013); Deputy Leader Partit Nazzjonalista 2013-2017.

The Mifsud Bonnici family A family steeped in politics for over 100 years.

- Carmelo Mifsud Bonnici, il-Gross, Cabinet Minister Partit Nazzjonalista (1930), and Member of the Legislative Assembly, 1923-1933.
  - Ugo Mifsud Bonnici (son of Carmelo Mifsud Bonnici; of President of Malta, 1994–99); Cabinet Minister Partit Nazzjonalista, 1987-1994.
    - Carmelo Mifsud Bonnici (son of Ugo Mifsud Bonnici; Home Affairs Minister, 2008–2012, Member of Parliament, 1998–present)
- Karmenu Mifsud Bonnici(KMB) (Prime Minister of Malta, 1984–87 leader of Labour Party, 1984–1992)
- Antoine Mifsud Bonnici (brother of Karmenu Mifsud Bonnici); Member of Parliament of Parliament, 1976-2008; Parliamentary Secretary (for the elderly), 1992-1996, 1998-2003. Partit Nazzjonalista
  - Paula Mifsud Bonnici (daughter of Antoine Mifsud Bonnici); Member of Parliament 2013–2017,2022–present.Partit Nazzjonalista

The Mintoff family

- Dom Mintoff (Prime Minister of Malta, 1955–1958, 1971–1984 leader of Labour Party, 1949–1984); Architect of Malta’s Republican Constitution (1974);
  - Yana Mintoff (daughter of Dom Mintoff, Maltese politician)
  - Wenzu Mintoff (nephew of Dom Mintoff, former Labour MP and founder of Alternattiva Demokratika)

The Mizzi family

- Fortunato Mizzi (leader, Nationalist Party)
  - Enrico Mizzi (son of Fortunato Mizzi, Prime Minister of Malta, 1950)

The Said family

- Chris Said (Minister of Justice, Information and Dialogue, 2012–2013)
  - Edward Said (brother of Chris, Mayor of Nadur, 2015–present)
  - Charles Said (brother of Chris, Mayor of Nadur, 2012–2015)

The Zerafa family

- Lydia Zerafa (First Lady of Prime Minister of Malta, 2020–present)
  - Alison Zerafa Civelli (Sister of Lydia Abela, Parliament Secretary for Local Government, 2022–present)

== Marshall Islands ==
The Alik family

- Alee Alik (Member of Parliament, 1979–1987)
- Evlynn Konou (first cousin of Alee Alik; Member of Parliament, 1979–95)
- Alik J. Alik (brother of Alee Alik; Member of Parliament 1991–2012, Vice Speaker of Parliament, 2008–12)
  - Jurelang Zedkaia (nephew of Alee Alik; President of the Marshall Islands, 2009–2012)
  - Rien J. Morris (nephew of Alee Alik; Member of Parliament, 1995–)

The Kabua family

- Amata Kabua (President of the Marshall Islands, 1979–96)
  - David Kabua (President of the Marshall Islands, 2020)
- Imata Kabua (cousin of Amata Kabua; President of the Marshall Islands, 1997–2000)

The Note family

- Nathan Note (anti-nuclear lobbyist in Bikini Atoll)
  - Kessai Note (nephew of Nathan Note; President of the Marshall Islands, 2000–08)
  - Tomaki Juda (cousin of Kessai Note; Member of Parliament 2000–, Vice Speaker of Parliament, 2012–)

== Mauritius ==
The Ah-Chuen and Leung Shing family

- Moilin Jean Ah-Chuen, minister and legislative council member
- Marie Madeleine Lee (daughter of Moilin Jean), overseas member of the Republic of China's Legislative Yuan (1981–1984), Mauritian ambassador to the People's Republic of China (2000–2002)
- Pierre Leung Shing (brother-in-law of Moilin Jean), overseas member of the Republic of China's Control Yuan (1987–1990)
  - Emmanuel Leung Shing (son of Pierre), attorney general and justice minister (2001–2005)

The Bérenger family

- Paul Bérenger (MP, former Prime Minister of Mauritius, Leader of Mauritian Militant Movement)
- Joanna Bérenger (MP)

The Boolell family

- Sir Satcam Boolell (former minister)
- Arvin Boolell (son of Satcam Boolell; former minister)
- Satyajit Boolell (younger son of Satcam Boolell; Director of Public Prosecution)
- Satish Boolell (nephew of Satcam Boolell; former Police Chief Medical Officer and former MP)
- Anil Gayan (nephew of Satcam Boolell; former minister)
- Sushil Kushiram (son-in-law of Satcam Boolell; former minister)

The Duval family

- Sir Gaëtan Duval (Foreign Minister, 1969–1973)
- Xavier-Luc Duval (son of Gaëtan Duval; Vice Prime Minister of Mauritius 2005, leader of the Mauritian Social Democratic Party)
- Richard Duval (step-son of Gaëtan Duval; MP)
- Hervé Duval (brother of Gaetan Duval; retired civil servant and former minister)
- Ghislaine Henry (sister of Gaetan Duval; former Member of Parliament (MP) and former ambassador)
- Thierry Henry (son of Ghislaine Henry; former MP)

The Guttee family

- Rajnarain Guttee (former MP)
- Rohitnarain Singh Guttee (former MP, younger brother of Rajnarain Guttee)

The Jeetah family

- Ramnath Jeetah (former MP)
- Rajesh Jeetah (former minister)

The Jugnauth family

- Sir Anerood Jugnauth(former President of Mauritius, and former Prime Minister of Mauritius)
- Pravind Jugnauth (son of Anerood Jugnauth), Prime Minister of Mauritius, Leader of Militant Socialist Movement
- Ashok Jugnauth (brother of Anerood Jugnauth, former minister)
- Maya Hanoomanjee (niece of Anerood Jugnauth), former MP and former Speaker of the parliament
- Lall Jugnauth (cousin of Anerood Jugnauth), former Attorney General and former MP

The Mohamed family

- Sir Abdool Razack Mohamed, former minister
- Yousuf Mohamed (son of Abdool Razack Mohamed; former minister and lawyer)
- Shakeel Mohamed (grandson of Abdool Razack Mohamed and son of Yousuf Mohamed; lawyer and former minister)

The Ramgoolam family

- Sir Seewoosagur Ramgoolam (former Prime Minister of Mauritius)
- Navin Ramgoolam (son of Sir Seewoosagur Ramgoolam; former Prime Minister of Mauritius, Leader of Labour Party)

The Seetaram family

- Iswurdeo Seetaram (former MP and former Speaker)
- Jangbahadoorsing Iswurdeo Mola Roopchand Seetaram (former MP)

The Uteem family

- Cassam Uteem (former president of the Republic; former minister)
- Reza Uteem (son of Cassam Uteem; MP)

The Virahsawmy family

- Simadree Virahsamy (former MP)
- Dev Virahsawmy (former MP, son of Simadree)
- Deva Virahsawmy (former MP, cousin of Dev)
- Jaya Krishna Cuttaree (brother-in-law of Deva)
- Roshni Mooneeram (nice of Dev, Founder of Ensam Nou Kapav)

== Mexico ==
The Abascal family (father, son)

- Salvador Abascal, Leader of the National Synarchist Union
  - Carlos María Abascal Carranza, Secretary of the Interior 2005–06

The Ávila Camacho family (brothers)

- Manuel Ávila Camacho, President of Mexico 1940–46
- Maximino Ávila Camacho, Governor of Puebla 1937–41
- Rafael Ávila Camacho, Governor of Puebla 1951–57

The Calderón Hinojosa family (father, children, daughter-in-law)

- Luis Calderón Vega, Founder of the National Action Party (PAN).
  - Felipe Calderón Hinojosa, President of Mexico 2006–2012; son of Calderón Vega
  - Margarita Zavala de Calderón, Former PAN deputy; wife of Calderón Hinojosa
  - Luisa María Calderón Hinojosa, Former PAN senator; daughter of Calderón Vega
  - Juan Luis Calderón Hinojosa, public servant in Michoacán; son of Calderón Vega
  - Carmen de Fátima Calderón Hinojosa, public servant in Michoacán; daughter of Calderón Vega

The Cárdenas family (grandfather, father, son)

- Lázaro Cárdenas, President of Mexico 1934–1940
  - Cuauhtémoc Cárdenas, Head of Government of the Federal District 1997–1999
    - Lázaro Cárdenas Batel, Governor of Michoacán 2002–2008

The Herrera family (grandfather, father, nephew, son)

- Ernesto Herrera Ale, Mayor of Gomez Palacio, and owner of Chilchota
  - Jorge Herrera Caldera, Governor of the Durango (2010–2016)
    - Juana Leticia Herrera Ale, current mayor of Gomez Palacio

The Lascurain family

- Mariano Paredes Arrillaga,President of Mexico
  - Pedro Lascurain Paredes, President of Mexico

The del Mazo family (grandfather, father, nephew, son)

- Alfredo del Mazo Vélez, Governor of the State of Mexico 1945–1951
  - Alfredo del Mazo González, Governor of the State of Mexico 1981–1986
    - Enrique Peña Nieto, Governor of the State of Mexico 2005–2011, President of Mexico 2012–present; also nephew of Arturo Montiel, governor of the State of Mexico 1999–2005
    - Alfredo del Mazo Maza, Governor of the State of Mexico 2017–present

The Madero family (father, sons)

- Evaristo Madero, Governor of Coahuila
  - Francisco I. Madero, President of Mexico, 1911–1913
  - Gustavo A. Madero, Parliamentarian and revolutionary, Head of Government of the Federal District

Moreira family

- Humberto Moreira Valdez (Governor of Coahuila 2005–2011)
- Rubén Moreira Valdez (Governor of Coahuila 2011-2017 )

The Obregón family (father, son)

- Alvaro Obregón, President of Mexico 1920–24
  - Alvaro Obregón Tapia, Governor of Sonora 1955–61

The Sodi family (great-grandfather, grandfather, uncle, grandchildren)

- Carlos Sodi Candiani, senator for Oaxaca 1882–1884, senator for Michoacán for approximately 25 years
  - Demetrio Sodi Guergué, president of the Supreme Court of Justice of the Nation 1908–1910, Secretary of Justice March 25, 1911 – May 25, 1911; son of Carlos
    - Carlos Franco Sodi, Attorney General of the Republic 1952–1956; nephew of Demetrio
      - Demetrio Sodi de la Tijera, federal deputy 1998–1991 and 1997–2000, senator for Mexico City 2000–2006, head of Miguel Hidalgo borough 2009–2012; grandson of Demetrio
      - Gabriela Sodi Miranda, federal deputy 2021–present; granddaughter of Demetrio

== Montserrat ==
The Bramble family

- William Henry Bramble (Chief Minister of Montserrat, 1960–70)
  - Percival Austin Bramble (son of William Henry Bramble; Chief Minister of Montserrat, 1970–78)

== Mozambique ==
The Mandela family (South Africa) and Machel family

- Samora Machel – President of Mozambique (1975–83); first husband of Graça Machel
- Graça Machel – First Lady of Mozambique (1975–83) and South Africa (1998–99); widow of Samoa Machel; 3rd wife of Nelson Mandela
- Nelson Mandela – President of South Africa (1994–1999)
- Winnie Madikizela-Mandela – political activist; 2nd wife of Nelson Mandela

The Guebuza-Dai family (brothers-in-law)

- Armando Guebuza, President (2005–15)
- Tobias Joaquim Dai, Defense Minister (2000–08)

== Myanmar ==
The (Bogyoke Aung San) + (Daw Khin Kyi)'s Family

- Aung San, Founder of the Unitary State, Deputy Prime Minister of Burma (1943-1945), Prime Minister of British Burma (1946-1947)
- Khin Kyi, wife of Aung San, Minister of Social Welfare (1953-1960), Burmese Ambassador to India (1960-1967)
- Aung San Suu Kyi, daughter of Aung San, State Counsellor of Myanmar and Minister of Foreign Affairs (2016-2021)

== Namibia ==
The Nujoma family (father-son)

- Sam Nujoma (President of Namibia, 1990–2005)
  - Utoni Nujoma (Foreign minister)

== Nauru ==
The Adeang family

- Kennan Adeang (President of Nauru, 1986 and 1996)
  - David Adeang (son of Kennan Adeang; Finance Minister, 2004–07 and 2011–)

The Detudamo family

- Timothy Detudamo Head Chief of Nauru
  - Buraro Detudamo (son of Timothy Detudamo, Chief and Island Councilor, Member of Parliament, 1968–92)

The Dowiyogo family

- Bernard Dowiyogo (President of Nauru, 1976–78, 1989–95, 1996, 1998–99, 2000–01 and 2003)
  - Valdon Dowiyogo (son of Bernard Dowiyogo; Member of Parliament, Speaker of Parliament)
- "Wawani Dowiyogo (Son of Valdon Dowiyogo; Member of Parliament)

The Keke-Stephen family

- Ludwig Dowong Keke (Member of Parliament, 1968–72, 1989–95, 1997–2000)
- Leo Depagadogi Keke (brother of Ludwig Keke; Member of Parliament, 1976–80)
  - Kieren Keke (son of Ludwig Keke; Member of Parliament, Minister for Health)
- Lawrence Stephen (brother-in-law to Ludwig and Leo Keke Member of Parliament, 1971–77, 1980–1986)
  - Marcus Stephen (son of Lawrence Stephen; Member of Parliament, 2003–07, President of Nauru, 2007–)

The Kun family

- Ruben James Tullen Kun (Member of Parliament, 1971–92)
  - Roland Kun (son of Ruben Kun; Member of Parliament, 2003–, Minister for Justice)
  - Russell Kun (cousin of Roland Kun; Member of Parliament, 2003–2004)

== Nepal ==
The Basnyat dynasty

- Shivaram Singh Basnyat (Senapati Badabir)
  - Naahar Singh Basnyat (Kaji)
  - Kehar Singh Basnyat (Kaji) married Chitrawati Devi, daughter of Kalu Pande.
    - Kirtiman Singh Basnyat (Mulkaji)
    - Bakhtawar Singh Basnyat (Mulkaji)
  - Abhiman Singh Basnyat (Mulkaji)
  - Dhokal Singh Basnyat (Governor)

The Pande dynasty

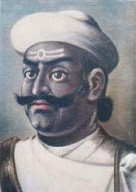
Damodar Pande

- Ganesh Pandey (Kaji of Gorkha)
  - Kalu Pande (Kaji of Gorkha), descendant of Ganesh Pande
    - Bamsa Raj Pandey (Dewankaji)
    - Damodar Pande (Mulkaji)
      - Rana Jang Pande (Mukhtiyar)
        - Bhim Bahadur Pande, seventh descendant of Kalu Pande
          - Prithvi Bahadur Pande, son of Bhim Bahadur

The Rana dynasty

- Ram Krishna Kunwar
- Bal Narsingh Kunwar, grandson of Ram Krishna
  - Jung Bahadur Rana
  - Bam Bahadur Kunwar
  - Ranodip Singh Kunwar
    - Bir Shamsher Jang Bahadur Rana, nephew of Jung Bahadur Rana
    - Dev Shamsher Jang Bahadur Rana, nephew of Jung Bahadur Rana
    - Chandra Shamsher Jang Bahadur Rana
      - Mohan Shamsher Jang Bahadur Rana
        - Pashupati Shamsher Jang Bahadur Rana, grandson of Mohan Shamsher
      - Baber Shamsher Jang Bahadur Rana
        - Udaya Shumsher Rana, great-grandson of Baber
      - Kaiser Shamsher Jang Bahadur Rana
    - Bhim Shamsher Jang Bahadur Rana
      - Padma Shamsher Jang Bahadur Rana
        - Subarna Shamsher Rana, nephew of Padma Shamsher
    - Juddha Shumsher Jung Bahadur Rana
      - Kiran Shamsher Rana

The Thapa dynasty

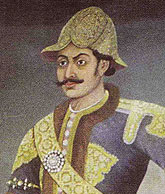
Bhimsen Thapa, influential member of Thapa dynasty

- Bir Bhadra Thapa (Kaji)
  - Amar Singh Thapa (Sardar) (Sanukaji)
    - Bhimsen Thapa (Mukhtiyar)
    - Nain Singh Thapa (General Kaji)
      - Queen Tripurasundari of Nepal
      - Ujir Singh Thapa (Colonel Kaji)
      - Mathabar Singh Thapa (PM C-in-C)
    - Bhaktabar Singh Thapa (Colonel Kaji)
    - Ranabir Singh Thapa (General Kaji)

The Koirala family

- Krishna Prasad Koirala
  - Matrika Prasad Koirala (brother of Bishweshwar Prasad Koirala; Prime Minister of Nepal, 1951–52 and 1953–55)
  - Bishweshwar Prasad Koirala (Prime Minister of Nepal, 1959–60)
  - Girija Prasad Koirala (brother of Bishweshwar Prasad Koirala; Prime Minister of Nepal, 1991–94, 1998–99, and 2000–01)
    - Sujata Koirala (daughter of Girija Prasad Koirala; vice Prime Minister of Nepal 2009–10)

Connected Member

- Sushil Koirala (Prime Minister of Nepal, 2014–15; cousin of B.P., Girija)
- Shailaja Acharya (former deputy prime minister of Nepal; niece of Matrika, B.P. and Girija)

== The Netherlands ==
The Donner family

- Johannes Hendricus Donner (1824–1903, member of House of Representatives from 1880 to 1901)
  - Jan Donner (1891–1981, Minister of Justice 1926–33), grandson of Johannes Hendricus Donner
    - André Donner (1918–92, member of the state committee on revising the Constitution 1950–54, chairman of the state committee on revising the Constitution 1967–71), son of Jan Donner
      - Piet Hein Donner (born 1948, Member of the Council of State 1997–2002, minister from 2002 to 2012, current vice-president of the Council of State), son of André Donner

The Regout family

- Petrus Dominicus Regout (1801–78, member of Senate 1849–59)
  - Hubert Gérard Louis Regout (1832–1905, member of Senate 1881–1904), son of Petrus Dominicus Regout
    - Louis Hubert Willem Regout (1861–1915, member of Senate 1904–09 and 1909–13, Minister of Water 1909–13, Dutch delegate to the Holy See from July 1915 to his death in October 1915), son of Hubert Gérard Louis Regout, brother of Robert Regout
      - Ludovicus Franciscus Hubertus Regout (1891–1966, member of Senate 1948–63), son of Louis Hubert Willem Regout
    - Robert Regout (1863–1913, member of House of Representatives 1905–10, Minister of Justice 1910–13), son of Hubert Gérard Louis Regout

== New Zealand ==
The Allen family (grandfather-grandson)

- William Shepherd Allen – Member of Parliament 1890–91 for Te Aroha.
  - John Manchester Allen – Member of Parliament 1938–41 for Hauraki. Grandson of William.

The Ardern family (cousins)

- Shane Ardern – Member of Parliament (1998–2014) for Taranaki–King Country.
- Jacinda Ardern – Member of Parliament (2008–2023), Prime Minister (2017–2023), cousin of Shane

The Armstrong family (father-son)

- Tim Armstrong – Christchurch City Councilor 1919–25, 1927–29, Member of Parliament 1922–1939
  - Tommy Armstrong – Member of Parliament 1943–1951, Christchurch City Councilor 1929–35, 1962–65, son of Tim

The Atmore–Baigent family (brothers-in-law)

- Harry Atmore – Member of Parliament for Nelson 1911–46 and Minister of Education 1928–31. Member of Nelson City Council 1905. Harry Atmore was the son-in-law of James Corrigan Member of Parliament for Patea 1922–25. Brother-in-law of Henry
- Henry Baigent – Mayor of Nelson 1901–04 and 1905–06 and Nelson City Councilor 1893–1901

The Barclay family (father-son-cousin)

- Jim Barclay – Member of Parliament 1935–43 for Marsden and Minister of Agriculture 1941–43
  - Bruce Barclay – Member of Parliament 1969–79 for Christchurch Central
  - Ron Barclay – Member of Parliament 1966–75 for New Plymouth. Deputy Mayor of New Plymouth District Council

The Bell family (father-son-grandsons)

- Sir Dillon Bell – Speaker 1871–75. Son-in-law Scobie Mackenzie Member of Parliament for Mt. Ida 1884–93 and Dunedin 1896–99
  - Sir Francis Bell – Prime Minister 1925, son of Sir Dillon
    - William Bell – Member of Parliament 1911–14, son of Sir Francis
    - Cheviot Bell – Member of Legislative Council 1950, son of Sir Francis and brother of William

The Brandon family (father-son)

- Alfred Brandon, Sr. – Member of Parliament for Wellington Country 1858–81 and Legislative Council 1883–86
  - Alfred Brandon, Jr. – Mayor of Wellington 1893–94 and Wellington City Councilor 1886–91

The Bridges–O'Connor family (brothers-in-law)

- Simon Bridges – Member of Parliament (2008–2022), Leader of the Opposition (2018–2020), Cabinet Minister
  - Simon O'Connor – Member of Parliament (2011–present), married to Bridges' sister Rachel

The Brown–Garrick–Peacock–Webb family (brothers-in-law)

- John Thomas Peacock, MP 1868–1873, MLC 1873–1905
- John Evans Brown, MP 1871–1879 and 1881–1884, married Peacock's sister Theresa Australia
- Francis James Garrick, MP 1884–1887, married Peacock's sister Elizabeth
- Henry Richard Webb, MP 1873–1875, married Peacock's sister Augusta Ann

The Carter–Doocey family (father-son-nephew/grandson)

- Maurice Carter – Christchurch City Councilor (1956–89), Canterbury Regional Councilor (1989–95)
  - David Carter – Member of Parliament (1994–2020), Cabinet Minister, Speaker (2013–17), son of Maurice
  - Matt Doocey - Member of Parliament (2014–present), grandson of Maurice and nephew of David

The Connelly family (father-son)

- Michael Connelly – Member of Legislative Council 1936–1950
  - Mick Connelly – Member of Parliament 1956–84 and Cabinet Minister, son of Michael

The Courtney–Williams family (great-grandfather and great-grandson)

- Thomas Williams – Christchurch City Councilor and Gore Borough Councilor 19th Century
  - Mel Courtney – Nelson City Councilor and Member of Parliament for Nelson 1976–81

The Douglas family (father-sons)

- Norman Douglas – Member of Parliament 1960–75 and son-in-law of Member of Parliament Bill Anderton
  - Sir Roger Douglas – Member of Parliament 1969–90, 2008–11, Minister of Finance (1984–88) and founder of the ACT Party 1995, son of Norman
  - Malcolm Douglas – Member of Parliament 1978–79, son of Norman and brother of Sir Roger

The Field family (brothers-cousin)

- Henry Field – Member of Parliament for Otaki 1896–99
- William Field – Member of Parliament for Otaki 1900–1935, brother of Henry
- Tom Field – Member of Parliament for Nelson 1914–19, cousin to Henry and William

The Fisher family (father-son)

- George Fisher – Member of Parliament for Wellington 1884–90 and Mayor of Wellington
  - Frank Fisher – Member of Parliament for Wellington 1905–14, son of George

The Fraser family (husband-wife)

- Peter Fraser – Member of Parliament 1918–50, Prime Minister 1940–49.
- Janet Fraser – Member of the Wellington Hospital Board 1925–35, wife of Peter

The Fraser family (husband-wife)

- Bill Fraser – Member of Parliament 1957–81
- Dorothy Fraser – Chair of the Otago Hospital Board 1974–86, wife of Bill

Both were members of the Dunedin City Council

The Fraser–Cullen family (wife-husband)

- Anne Fraser – Member of Parliament for East Cape 1984–90
- Michael Cullen – Member of Parliament (1981–2009), Deputy Prime Minister, husband of Anne

The Gerard family (father-son)

- Geoff Gerard – Member of Parliament 1943–69 for Mid-Canterbury and Ashburton
  - Jim Gerard – Member of Parliament 1984–97 for Rangiora. Mayor of Waimakariri 2001–07 and Waimakariri District Councillor 2010–

The Gill–Mitchell family (grandfather-grandson)

- Frank Gill – Member of Parliament (1969–80), Cabinet Minister, Ambassador to the United States (1980–82)
  - Mark Mitchell – Member of Parliament (2011–present), Cabinet Minister, grandson of Frank

The Graham family (great-grandfather-great-grandsons/brothers)

- Robert Graham – Member of Parliament 1855–68
  - Doug Graham – Member of Parliament 1984–1999 for Remuera and Cabinet Minister
  - Kennedy Graham – List Member of Parliament 2008–2017, brother of Doug

The Grigg family (husband-wife-husband-great-granddaughter)

- Arthur Grigg – Member of Parliament 1938–41 for Mid-Canterbury
- Mary Grigg – Member of Parliament 1942–43 for his seat after he was killed in World War II. Her grandfathers were Premier Sir John Hall, MP 1855–60 and 1866–93, and John Cracroft Wilson, MP 1866–70 and 1872–75. She married William Polson (Member of Parliament 1928–46) in 1943.
  - Nicola Grigg – Member of Parliament 2020–present for Selwyn, great-granddaughter of Arthur and Mary

The Hamilton brothers

- Adam Hamilton – Member of Parliament for Wallace 1919–22 and 1925–46. Leader of the Opposition 1936–40
- John Hamilton – Member of Parliament for Awarua 1919–22 and 1925–28, brother of Adam

The Hanan family (uncle-nephew)

- Josiah Hanan – Member of Parliament for Invercargill 1899–1925 and Cabinet Minister. Mayor of Invercargill 1896–1897
  - Ralph Hanan – Member of Parliament for Invercargill 1946–69 and Cabinet Minister, Mayor of Invercargill 1938–1941, nephew of Josiah

The Hay family (father-son)

- Sir James Hay – Christchurch City Councilor 1944–53
  - Sir Hamish Hay – Mayor of Christchurch 1974–89, son of Sir James

The Henare family (great-grandfather/great-grandsons)

- Tau Henare – Member of Parliament (1914–38)
  - Tau Henare, Jr. – Member of Parliament (1993–99 & 2005–2014) and Cabinet Minister (1996–99), great-grandson of Tau Henare
  - Peeni Henare - Member of Parliament (2014–present) and Cabinet Minister, great-grandson of Tau Henare and cousin of Tau Jr.

The Hislop family (father-son)

- Thomas Hislop, Sr. – Member of Parliament and Cabinet Minister. Mayor of Wellington 1905–1908
  - Thomas Hislop, Jr. – Mayor of Wellington 1931–44 and High Commissioner to Canada 1950–57

The Holland family (father-son-grandson)

- Henry Holland – Member of Parliament 1925–35 for Christchurch North and Mayor of Christchurch
  - Sir Sidney Holland – Leader of the New Zealand National Party and Prime Minister of New Zealand (1949–57)
    - Eric Holland – Cabinet Minister (1975–78), son of Sir Sidney.

The Holyoake family (father/son-in-law)

- Keith Holyoake – Member of Parliament 1932–38 (Motueka) and 1943–77 (Pahiatua) and Prime Minister
  - Ken Comber – Member of Parliament 1972–81, married Diane Holyoake daughter of Keith

The Howard family (father-daughter)

- Ted Howard – Member of Parliament (1919–39)
  - Mabel Howard – Member of Parliament (1943–69) and Cabinet Minister. Member of Christchurch City Council. Daughter of Ted

The Hutchison family (father-son)

- William Hutchison Member of Parliament 1879–84 and 1890–96. Mayor of Wellington
  - George Hutchison – Member of Parliament 1887–1901, son of William

The Izard family (father-son)

- Charles Beard Izard – Member of Parliament from 1887 to 1890
  - Charles Hayward Izard – Member of Parliament from 1905 to 1908, son of Charles Beard

The Jeffries brothers

- John Jeffries – Wellington City Councillor 1962–74, Deputy Mayor 1971–74
- Bill Jeffries – Wellington City Councillor 1974–80, Member of Parliament for Heretaunga 1981–90, brother of John

The Kirk family (father-son-great-niece)

- Norman Kirk – Member of Parliament (1957–1974) and Prime Minister
  - John Kirk – Member of Parliament (1974–84), son of Norman
    - Jo Luxton – Member of Parliament (2017–present), great-niece of Norman

The Lange–Bassett family (Bassett was a cousin of Lange)

- David Lange – Prime Minister of New Zealand (1984–89)
- Michael Bassett – Member of Parliament (1972–75, 1978–90) and Cabinet Minister (1984–90), cousin of David

The Lee family (father-daughter)

- Graeme Lee – Member of Parliament (1981–96) and Cabinet Minister
  - Denise Lee – Member of Parliament (2017–20), Auckland Councilor (2013–17), daughter of Graeme

The Levin family (father-son)

- Nathaniel Levin – Member of Legislative Council 1869–71
  - William Levin – Member of Parliament for Wellington 1879–84, son of Nathaniel

The Luxton family (father-son)

- Jack Luxton – Member of Parliament for Piako (seat renamed Matamata) 1966–87
  - John Luxton – Member of Parliament for Matamata 1987–99 and Cabinet Minister 1990–99, son of Jack

The McCombs family (husband-wife-son)

- James McCombs – Member of Parliament (1913–1933)
- Elizabeth McCombs – first woman Member of Parliament (1933–1935)
  - Terry McCombs – Member of Parliament (1935–51) and Cabinet Minister, son of James and Elizabeth

All three were members of Christchurch City Council.

The MacIntyre family (father-son)

- Duncan MacIntyre – Deputy Prime Minister
  - Hamish MacIntyre – Member of Parliament 1990–93, son of Duncan

The Mackenzie family (father-son)

- Sir Thomas Mackenzie – Prime Minister 1912. Member of Parliament 1887 to 1896 and 1900 to 1912 and Cabinet Minister. High Commissioner in London 1912–20.
  - Sir Clutha Mackenzie – Member of Parliament 1921–22 for Auckland East. Became blind at the age of 20 as a result of action at Gallipoli 1915. Sir Clutha was the son-in-law of Rt. Hon. George Forbes. Son of Sir Thomas

The Mackey family (mother-daughter)

- Janet Mackey – Member of Parliament for East Coast (1996–2005)
  - Moana Mackey – List Member of Parliament (2003–14), daughter of Janet

The Maher–McCready family (father/son-in-law)

- Jimmy Maher – Member of Parliament (1946–60)
  - Allan McCready – Member of Parliament (1960–78), Cabinet Minister, husband of Maher's daughter Grace

The Mason–Wilford family (grandfather-grandson)

- Thomas Mason – Member of Parliament for Hutt 1879–84
  - Thomas Wilford – Member of Parliament for Hutt 1896–1929, grandson of Thomas and son-in-law of Sir George McLean, Member of Parliament for Waikouaiti 1871–81

The Massey family (father-two sons)

- Bill Massey – Member of Parliament 1894–1925 and Prime Minister 1912–25
  - Walter Massey – Member of Parliament for Hauraki 1931–35, son of Bill
  - Jack Massey – Member of Parliament for Franklin 1928–35 and 1938–57, son of Bill and brother of Walter

The McClay family (father-son)

- Roger McClay – Member of Parliament 1981–96 and Cabinet Minister
  - Todd McClay – Member of Parliament 2008–present, Cabinet Minister, son of Roger

The McMillan family (husband-wife)

- Dr Gervan McMillan – Member of Parliament 1935–43 for Dunedin West and Cabinet Minister. Member of Dunedin City Council
- Ethel McMillan – Member of Parliament 1953–75 for Dunedin North, wife of Gervan

The Montgomery family (father-son)

- William Montgomery Sr. – Member of Parliament for Akaroa 1874–87 and Minister of Education
- William Montgomery Jr. – Member of Parliament for Ellesmere 1893–99

The Moss family (father-son)

- Frederick Moss – Member of Parliament for Parnell 1876–90
  - Edward Moss – Member of Parliament for Ohinemuri 1902–05, son of Frederick

The Myers–Baume family (cousins)

- Frederick Baume – Member of Parliament for Auckland East
- Arthur Myers – elected Member of Parliament for Auckland East after Baume died. Mayor of Auckland

The Nash family (great-grandfather-great-grandson)

- Sir Walter Nash – Member of Parliament 1929–68 and Prime Minister
  - Stuart Nash – Member of Parliament 2008–11, 2014–present and Cabinet Minister

The Nordmeyer family (father-in-law & son-in-law)

- Sir Arnold Nordmeyer – Member of Parliament 1935–69 and Cabinet Minister. Leader of the Opposition 1963–65
  - Jim Edwards – Member of Parliament for Napier 1954–66, husband of Alison Nordmeyer and son-in-law of Sir Arnold

The O'Connor family (cousins)

- Damien O'Connor – Member of Parliament (1993–2008, 2009–present), Cabinet Minister
- Greg O'Connor – Member of Parliament (2017–present), cousin of Damien

The O'Flynn family (father-son)

- Francis Edward O'Flynn Member of the New Zealand Legislative Council 1937–42
  - Frank O'Flynn Member of Parliament 1972–75, and 1978–87

The Ormond–Wilson family (grandfathers-grandsons)

- James Wilson – Member of Parliament 1881–96
- John Ormond – Member of Parliament 1861–90
  - Ormond Wilson – Member of Parliament 1935–38 and 1946–49, grandson of James and John
  - Tiaki Omana – Member of Parliament for Eastern Maori 1943–63, grandson of John

The Paikea family (father-son)

- Paraire Paikea – Member of Parliament for Northern Maori 1938–43
  - Tapihana Paikea – Member of Parliament for Northern Maori 1943–63, son of Paraire

The Parata family (father-son-descendant)

- Tame Parata – Member of Parliament for Southern Maori 1885–1911
  - Taare Parata – Member of Parliament for Southern Maori 1911–18, son of Tame
    - Hekia Parata – Member of Parliament 2008–17 and Cabinet Minister, descendant of Tame and Taare

The Peters family (brothers)

- Ian Peters – National Party Member of Parliament for Tongariro (1990–1993)
- Jim Peters – New Zealand First Member of Parliament (2002–2005)
- Winston Peters – Leader of New Zealand First; Deputy Prime Minister of New Zealand (1996–98, 2017–20)

The Pharazyn family (father-son)

- Charles Johnson Pharazyn – Member of Legislative Council (1869–85)
  - Robert Pharazyn – Member of Parliament for Rangitikei (1865–66) and Legislative Council (1885–96)

The Ratana–Rurawhe family (brothers, wife, grandson)

- Toko Ratana – Member of Parliament 1935–1944, succeeded by his younger brother
- Matiu Ratana – Member of Parliament 1944–1949, succeeded by his wife
- Iriaka Rātana – Member of Parliament 1949–69 (all for Western Maori)
  - Adrian Rurawhe – Member of Parliament for Te Tai Hauauru (successor electorate to Western Maori) 2014–present, Speaker (2022–present), grandson of Matiu and Iriaka

The Reeves brothers

- Charles Reeves – Mayor of Dunedin 1876–77 and Dunedin City Councillor 1873–76
- Richard Reeves – Member of Parliament for Grey Valley and Inangahua 1878–1893 and Legislative Council 1895–1910 (Speaker 1895), brother of Charles

The Reeves family (father-son)

- William Reeves – Member of Parliament 1867–1868 & 1871–1875
  - William Pember Reeves – Member of Parliament 1887–1896 and Minister of Labour 1891–1896, son of William

The Rhodes family (brothers, father-son-cousin)

- William Barnard Rhodes – Member of Parliament 1853–55 & 1858–66
- Robert Heaton Rhodes – Member of Parliament 1871–74, William's brother
  - Sir Heaton Rhodes – Member of Parliament 1899–1925 and a Cabinet Minister
  - Arthur Rhodes – Member of Parliament and Mayor of Christchurch

The Richardson–Pearce family (Richardson was Pearce's great-granddaughter)

- George Pearce – Member of Parliament for Patea 1908–19
  - Ruth Richardson – Member of Parliament for Selwyn 1981–1994 and Minister of Finance

The Richmond–Atkinson family (brothers, relation by marriage)

- James Richmond – Member of Parliament 1860–1870 and a Cabinet Minister, and his brother
- William Richmond – Member of Parliament 1855–62 and a Cabinet Minister
- Harry Atkinson – Member of Parliament 1861–91 and Premier several times, related by marriage
- Arthur Atkinson – Member of Parliament 1899–1902, nephew of Harry

The Rolleston family (father-sons)

- William Rolleston – Provincial Superintendent, Member of Parliament and Cabinet Minister
  - Frank Rolleston – Member of Parliament for Timaru 1922–28 and Cabinet Minister, son of William
  - John Rolleston – Member of Parliament for Waitomo 1922–28, son of William and brother of Frank

The Seddon family (father-son-daughter)

- Richard Seddon – Prime Minister of New Zealand (1893–1906)
  - Tom Seddon – Member of Parliament for Westland 1906–22 and 1925–28, son of Richard
  - Elizabeth Gilmer – Wellington City Councilor 1941–53, daughter of Richard

The Semple family (husband-wife)

- Bob Semple – Member of Parliament 1918–19, 1928–54 and Cabinet Minister.
- Margaret Semple – Wellington City Councilor 1938–41, wife of Bob

The Sidey family (father-son)

- Sir Thomas Sidey – Member of Parliament for Caversham and Dunedin South 1901–28, Cabinet Minister and Member of Legislative Council 1928–33
  - Sir Stuart Sidey – Mayor of Dunedin 1959–65 and Dunedin City Councilor 1947–83

The Smith family (father-son)

- Edward Smith – Member of Parliament 1890–96 and 1899–1907
  - Sydney Smith – Member of Parliament 1918–25 and 1928–38 and Cabinet Minister, son of Edward

The Smith family (father-son)

- J. Valentine Smith – Member of Parliament 1855–1858
  - Harold Smith – Member of Parliament 1916–1919, son of J. Valentine

The Stewart family (father-son)

- William Downie Stewart Sr – Member of Parliament Dunedin West 19th Century
  - William Downie Stewart Jr – Member of Parliament 1914–1935 Dunedin West, Minister of Finance 1931–1933 and Mayor of Dunedin 1913–1914

The Sutton family (brothers)

- Jim Sutton – Member of Parliament (1984–90, 1993–2006) and Cabinet Minister (1990, 1999–2006)
- Bill Sutton – Member of Parliament (1984–90), brother of Jim

The Tamihere–Waititi family (father/son-in-law)

- John Tamihere – Labour Member of Parliament (1999–2005), Cabinet Minister, Māori Party Co-leader (2020)
  - Rawiri Waititi – Māori Party Member of Parliament and Co-leader (2020–present), married to Tamihere's daughter Kiri

The Taylor family (father-son)

- Tommy Taylor – Member of Parliament and Mayor of Christchurch 1911
  - Ted Taylor – Christchurch City Councilor 1968–71, son of Tommy

The Tirikatene family (father-daughter-nephew/grandson)

- Sir Eruera Tirikatene – Member of Parliament (1932–67) and Cabinet Minister (1943–49, 1957–60)
  - Whetu Tirikatene-Sullivan – Member of Parliament (1967–96) and Cabinet Minister (1972–75), daughter of Sir Eruera
    - Rino Tirikatene – Member of Parliament 2011–present, grandson of Sir Eruera and nephew of Whetu

The Tizard family (husband-wife; parents-daughter)

- Bob Tizard – Member of Parliament (1957–60 and 1963–90), Deputy Prime Minister and Minister of Finance (1974–75)
- Dame Catherine Tizard – Mayor of Auckland (1983–90) and Governor-General of New Zealand (1990–95), ex-wife of Bob
  - Judith Tizard – Member of Parliament (1993–2008) and Minister, daughter of Bob and Dame Catherine

The Uru brothers

- Hopere Uru – Member of Parliament for Southern Maori 1918–21
- Henare Uru – Member of Parliament for Southern Maori 1922–28, brother of Hopere

The Wakefield family (father-son-nephew)

- Edward Gibbon Wakefield (1796–1862) – Member of Parliament
  - Jerningham Wakefield (1820–79) – Member of Parliament
  - Edward Wakefield (1845–1924) – nephew, son of brother Felix Wakefield, Member of Parliament
- Edward Stafford (1819–1901) Member of Parliament and Premier, married niece Emily, daughter of brother William Wakefield

The Walls family (grandfather-grandson)

- Robert Walls – MP for Dunedin North 1945–53
  - Richard Walls – MP for Dunedin North 1975–78, Mayor of Dunedin 1989–95, grandson of Robert

The Ward family (father-son)

- Sir Joseph Ward – (1887–1930) Member of Parliament and Premier/Prime Minister
  - Vincent Ward – (1930–31) Member of Parliament, son of Sir Joseph

The Wetere–Mahuta family (uncle-niece)

- Koro Wētere – Member of Parliament 1969–96 and Cabinet Minister
  - Nanaia Mahuta – Member of Parliament 1996–present and Cabinet Minister, niece of Koro

The Wilkinson–McLay family (half-brothers)

- Peter Wilkinson – Member of Parliament (1969–84), Cabinet Minister
- Jim McLay – Member of Parliament (1975–87), Leader of the Opposition (1984–86), Cabinet Minister, half-brother of Peter

The Young–Bradford family (father-daughter-son/brother-in-law)

- Bill Young – Member of Parliament 1966–81 and Cabinet Minister
  - Annabel Young – Member of Parliament 1997–2002, daughter of Bill
  - Max Bradford – Member of Parliament 1990–2002 and Cabinet Minister, married to Bill's daughter Rosemary

The Young family (father-son)

- Venn Young – Member of Parliament 1966 to 1990 and Cabinet Minister
  - Jonathan Young – Member of Parliament for New Plymouth 2008–20, son of Venn

== Nicaragua ==
The Argüello family

- Juan Argüello del Castillo y Guzmán, (1778–1830), Deputy Head of State 1826–7; Head of State 1827–9, son of Narciso Jose Argüello y Monsivais (Cadiz, Spain, 1714-Granada, Nicaragua 1771). Narciso Jose, with his older brother Diego Nicolas Argüello y Monsivais (1706–1770), are the founders of the Argüello family in Nicaragua.
- Jose Argüello Arce (1821–1897), President of Congress, 1865–6, 1877–79, great-grandson of Diego Nicolas Argüello y Monsivais.
- Angélica Balladares de Argüello,(1872–1973). 1st Lady of the Liberal Party, 1925–1973; Pres.of the Nicaraguan Feminist League 1931–1937; UAW's "Woman of the Americas, Nicaragua Chapter",1959; Congressional Gold Medal 1969 laureate, wife of Guillermo Argüello Vargas.
- Leonardo Argüello Barreto,(1875–1947) Interior, Education and Foreign Minister; President of Nicaragua, 1947, direct descendant of Narciso Jose Argüello y Monsivais.
- Guillermo Argüello Vargas, grandson of José Argüello Arce; Minister of Education, 1924–26, Minister of Finance 1928–32; spouse of Angelica Balladares de Argüello
- Mariano Argüello Vargas (1890–1970) grandson of José Argüello Arce; President of Congress 1937, 1950, 1965; Foreign Minister 1939–41, and 1943–46; Vice-President, 1947
- Alejandro Argüello Montiel, (1917–1997) Deputy Head of Congress (1946–8), Signatary of Inter-American Treaty of Reciprocal Assistance (Rio Treaty, TIAR. 1947) first cousin of Alejandro Montiel Arguello and direct descendant of Diego Nicolas Arguello y Monsivais.
- Alejandro Montiel Argüello (1917–2012), Foreign Minister, 1959–63 and 1971–78, nephew of Mariano Argüello Vargas and direct descendant of both Narciso Jose and Diego Nicolas Argüello y Monsivais.
- Guillermo Argüello Poessy Vice Minister of Foreign Affairs, 2000, Pres. GAO, Comptroller, 2001–2014; nephew of Guillermo Argüello Vargas and great-grandson of José Argüello Arce;
- Carlos Argüello Gómez (born 1946) Justice Minister 1979–83, Chief Nicaraguan Negotiator and Ambassador to the UN World Court in the Hague, Netherlands, from 1983 to present and direct descendant of both Narciso Jose and Diego Nicolas Argüello y Monsivais.
- Bertha Marina Argüello Roman (de Rizo), Vice Minister of Family (2000) and of Foreign Affairs (2002), daughter of Guillermo Argüello Poessy.
- Silvio Argüello Cardenal, Vice-President, 1963–67, direct descendant of Narciso Jose Argüello y Monsivais.
- Mariángeles Argüello Robelo, Health Minister, 2000–02 direct descendant of Narciso Jose Argüello y Monsivais.
- Alejandro Argüello Choisell, Minister of Public Works, Industry & Commerce, 2005–2007. direct descendant of Narciso Jose Argüello y Monsivais.
- Noel Vidaurre Arguello, (1955–) Vice Minister of Finance and Economy 1990–1992, direct descendant of Narciso Jose Argüello y Monsivais.

The Chamorro family

The Sacasa family

- Roberto Sacasa Sarria, President of Nicaragua, 1889–91 and 1891–93
- Juan Bautista Sacasa Sacasa, son of Pres. Roberto Sacasa Sarria, President of Nicaragua, 1933–36
- Crisanto Sacasa Sacasa, nephew of Pres. Roberto Sacasa Sarria, Education Minister, 1933 and 1955
- Oscar Sevilla Sacasa, grandson of Pres. Roberto Sacasa Sarria, Foreign Minister
- Guillermo Sevilla Sacasa, grandson of Pres. Roberto Sacasa Sarria, Acting President of Nicaragua, 1936
- Benjamín Lacayo Sacasa, Pres. of Nicaragua, 1947
- Ramiro Sacasa Guerrero, Secretary of the Presidency, Labour Minister, 1953–5; Education Minister, 1966–8
- Noel Sacasa Cruz, great-grandson of Pres. Roberto Sacasa Sarria, Economy, Industry & Commerce Minister, 1999–2001
- Esteban Duque-Estrada Sacasa, great-grandson of Pres. Roberto Sacasa Sarria, Minister of Finance, 1999–2001
- Francisco Xavier Aguirre Sacasa, great-grandson of Roberto Sacasa Sarria, Foreign Minister, 2000–2002

The Ortega-Murillo family

- Daniel Ortega, President of Nicaragua (1979–90; 2007–)
- Rosario Murillo, First Lady and Vice President of Nicaragua (2017–)

The Somoza family

- Anastasio Somoza García President of Nicaragua, Head of State, 1934–56
- Luis Somoza Debayle, son of Pres. Anastasio Somoza García, grandson of Pres. Roberto Sacasa Sarria (see Sacasa family); President of Nicaragua, 1956–63
- Anastasio Somoza Debayle, son of Pres. Anastasio Somoza García, grandson of Pres. Roberto Sacasa Sarria (see Sacasa family); President of Nicaragua, 1967–72 and 1974–79

== Niger ==
The Diori family (cousins)

- Diori Hamani (President)
- Djibo Bakary (independence leader)

The Kountché family (cousins)

- Seyni Kountché (former military President)
- Ali Saibou (former military President)

== Nigeria ==
The Abubakar Olusola Saraki family (father, son, daughter)

- Abubakar Olusola Saraki 1979–1983: Senate Leader in Nigerian Senate
- Abubakar Olubukola Saraki 2003–2007 and 2007–2011: Governor of Kwara State, 2011–2019 : Senator in Nigerian Senate, 2015–2019: Senate President, under trial at code of conduct tribunal over no-disclosure of assets
- Gbemisola Ruqayyah Saraki 1999–2003: Member of Nigerian House of Representatives, 2003–2007: Senator in Nigerian Senate, 2007–2011: Senator in Nigerian Senate, 2011

The Awolowo family and the Osibanjo family (grandfather-in-law, grandson-in-law)

- Obafemi Awolowo, political activist and politician, premier of the Western Region, Leader of the Opposition in the Federal Parliament
- Yemi Osibanjo, lawyer and politician, Vice-President

The Ironsi family (father, son)

- Johnson Aguiyi-Ironsi January–July 1966: Nigerian military head of state
- Thomas Aguiyi Ironsi 2004–2007: Minister of Defense, 2001–2004: Nigerian Ambassador to Togo

The Onyeama family (father, son)

- Charles Dadi Onyeama 1964–1967: Justice of the Supreme Court of Nigeria
- Geoffrey Jideofor Kwusike Onyeama 2015–2019: Nigeria's Minister for Foreign Affairs, 2019 (incumbent): Nigeria's Minister for Foreign Affairs.

== North Macedonia ==
The Crvenkovski family (father-son)

- Krste Crvenkovski (Secretary of the League of Communists of Macedonia)
  - Stevo Crvenkovski (Foreign minister)

== Norway ==
The Stoltenberg family All members of the family are associated with the Norwegian Labour Party

- Thorvald Stoltenberg (1998–2008: President of the Norwegian Red Cross, 1996–99: Ambassador to Denmark, 1987–89 and 1990–93: Minister of Foreign Affairs), 1990: UN High Commissioner for Refugees, 1979–1981: Minister of Defense.
- Karin Stoltenberg (wife of Thorvald Stoltenberg) 1986–1987 Junior minister of Trade and Shipping, 1987–88 Junior minister of Business Affairs.
  - Jens Stoltenberg (son of Thorvald Stoltenberg and Karin Stoltenberg) (2000–01, 2005–13 Prime Minister 1993–96 Minister of Trade and Energy 1996–97 Minister Finance and Customs) Leader of the Labour Party 2002–2014, 13th Secretary General of the North Atlantic Treaty Organization 2014–present
  - Ingrid Schulerud (married to Jens Stoltenberg) (has a high-profile diplomatic position in the Norwegian Ministry of Foreign Affairs) (21st Norwegian Ambassador to Belgium 2015–present)
- Johan Jørgen Holst (Thorvald Stoltenberg's brother-in-law, [married to Karin's sister]) (1993–94 Minister of Foreign Affairs and known for leading peace negotiations in the Middle East. 1987–89 and 1991–93 Minister of Defense.)
- Anne-Catharina Vestly (Ingrid Schulerud aunt) (Writer of literature for children with a left wing and feministic political message, and political advocate for less secrecy toward children about sex)

The Gerhardsen family All members of the family are associated with the Norwegian Labour Party

- Einar Gerhardsen (1945–51, 1955–63 and 1963–65 Prime Minister)
  - Rune Gerhardsen (son of Einar Gerhardsen) (1991–96 Leader of the city government in Oslo)
  - Tove Strand (divorced from Rune Gerhardsen and mother of Mina Gerhardsen) (1986–89 Minister of Social Affairs 1990–92 Minister of Employment and Administration)
    - Mina Gerhardsen (daughter of Rune Gerhardsen and Tove Strand and granddaughter of Einar Gerhardsen) (2005–2013 Political advisor for Prime Minister Jens Stoltenberg)
    - Eirik Øwre Thorshaug (married to Mina Gerhardsen) (2007–present political advisor for Minister of Justice Knut Storberget)

The Harlem family All members of the family are associated with the Norwegian Labour Party

- Gudmund Harlem. Minister of Social Affairs 1955–61 and Minister of Defense, 1961–63 and 1963–65.
  - Gro Harlem Brundtland. Daughter of Gudmund Harlem. Minister of Environmental Affairs 1974–79. Prime Minister three times: February 1981 – October 1981, 1986–89, and 1990–96. Director-General of the World Health Organization, 1998–2003.
  - Hanne Harlem. Daughter of Gudmund Harlem, sister of Gro Harlem Brundtland. Minister of Justice 2000–2001.

The Bondevik family All members of the family is associated with the Norwegian Christian Democratic Party

- Kjell Bondevik (1963 Minister of Social Affairs, 1965–71 Minister of Education and Church Affairs)
  - Kjell Magne Bondevik (nephew of Kjell Bondevik) (1997–2000 and 2000–05 Prime Minister, 1989–1990 Minister of Foreign Affairs, 1983–86 Minister of Education and Church Affairs)

== Pakistan ==
Bhutto family

- Zulfiqar Ali Bhutto, Civil Administrator, Prime Minister 1971–1977.
  - Benazir Bhutto, 11th Prime Minister 1988–1990, 13th Prime Minister 1993–1996, Leader of the Opposition, Chairman of the Pakistan Peoples Party.

Sharif family

- Nawaz Sharif, Quaid of Pakistan, Muslim League Leader (Nawaz), Prime Minister 1990–1993, again Prime Minister 1996–1999, third term 2013–2017.
- Mian Muhammad Shehbaz Sharif, Chief minister Punjab 1996–1999, again chief minister 2008–2013, again chief minister 2013–2018, Opposition leader in National Assembly 2018–2022, Prime Minister of Pakistan 2022–present.

== Palau ==
The Nakamura family (Brothers-sons)

- Kuniwo Nakamura (President, Vice President)
  - Aric Nakamura (Senator (2017–2021)
- Daiziro Nakamura (Senator)
- Mamoru Nakamura (Chief Justice)
- Toshiwo Nakamura (Legislator)

The Remengesau family (father-son)

- Thomas Remengesau, Sr. (President, 1988–89 & 1985, Vice President, 1986–88)
  - Tommy Remengesau (President, 2013–2021 & 2001–09, Vice President 1993–2001, Senator 1989–93 & 2009–13)
    - TJ Imrur Remengesau (Senator 2021–Present)

The Tmetuchl-Toriboing family

- Roman Tmetuchl (Presidential candidate 1980, 1984 & 1988, Governor of Airai State 1981–1990), Senator of First Congress of Micronesia for the TTPI 1971 - 1979), member of Council of Chiefs as Ngiraked of Tmeleu Clan of Airai State 1979–1999)
  - Mlib Tmetuchl (son, Vice Presidential Candidate (2016) Senator 2009–2017)
  - Johnson Toribiong (nephew, President, 2009–2013, member of Council of Chiefs as Ngiraked of Tmeleu Clan of Airai State 1999–2008)
  - Joel Toribiong (nephew, Senator 2009–2017)
  - Lucius (Lakius) Malsol (nephew, Senator 2003-2005 & 1997–2001)

The Whipps family (father-son)

- Surangel S. Whipps (Presidential candidate (2008), President of the Senate (2001–2009), former Speaker of the House of Delegates (1985–2001), member of Council of Chiefs as Rekemesik of Inglai Clan of Ngatpang State (1997–present))
  - Surangel S. Whipps, Jr. (son, President 2021–present, Presidential Candidate 2016, Governor of Ngatpang State, Senator (2009–2017), Honorary Consul of South Korea to Palau (2000–2021))
  - Mason Whipps (son, Senator (2013–present), Speaker of the Airai State Legislature (2008–12), Governor of Ngatpang State)
  - Eric Ksau Whipps (son, Philippine Honorary Consul to Palau (2013–present))

== Panama ==
The Arias family

- Arnulfo Arias Madrid (President of Panama, 1940–41, 1949–51, and 1968)
- Mireya Moscoso (wife of Arnulfo Arias Madrid; President of Panama, 1999–2004)
- Harmodio Arias Madrid (brother of Arnulfo Arias Madrid; President of Panama, 1932–36)

The Arosemena family (brothers-in-law)

- Juan Demóstenes Arosemena (President of Panama, 1936–39)
- Alcibíades Arosemena (President of Panama, 1951–52)

The Boyd family (father-son)

- Federico Boyd (President of Panama, 1910)
  - Augusto Samuel Boyd (President of Panama, 1939–40)

The Chiari-Robles family

- Rodolfo Chiari (President of Panama, 1924–28)
  - Roberto Francisco Chiari Remón (son of Rodolfo Chiari; President of Panama, 1960–64)
  - Marco Aurelio Robles (nephew of Rodolfo Chiari; President of Panama, 1964–68)

The Delvalle family (uncle-nephew)

- Max Delvalle (Vice President, 1964–48)
  - Eric Arturo Delvalle (President of Panama, 1985–88)

The Lewis family (father-son)

- Gabriel Lewis Galindo (Foreign Minister, 1994–96)
  - Samuel Lewis Navarro (Foreign Minister, 2004–09)

The Torrijos family (father-son)

- Omar Torrijos (Panamanian leader, 1968–81)
  - Martín Torrijos (President of Panama, 2004–09)

== Papua New Guinea ==
The Chan family (father-son)

- Sir Julius Chan, Prime Minister of Papua New Guinea, 1980–1982 and 1994–97
  - Byron Chan, member of the National Parliament, 2002–present

The Somare family (father-son)

- Sir Michael Somare, Prime Minister of Papua New Guinea, 1975–80, 1982–85 and 2002–present
  - Arthur Somare, member of the National Parliament, 1997–present

== Paraguay ==
The Argaña family

- Luis María Argaña (Vice President, 1998–99)
  - Félix Argaña (son of Luis María Argaña; vice presidential candidate)
  - Nelson Argaña (son of Luis María Argaña; cabinet minister)

The Cubas family

- Raúl Cubas Grau (President of Paraguay, 1998–99)
- Carlos Cubas Grau (brother of Raúl Cubas Grau; cabinet minister)

The López family

- Carlos Antonio López (President of Paraguay, 1844–62)
  - Francisco Solano López (son of Carlos Antonio López; President of Paraguay, 1862–69)

== Peru ==
The Acuña family

- Virgilio Acuña Peralta, Congressman (2011–16)
- Humberto Acuña Peralta, Governor of Lambayeque (2010–18)
- César Acuña Peralta, Congressman (2000–06), Mayor of Trujillo (2007–14) and Governor of La Libertad (2015)
- Carmen Rosa Núñez Campos, Congresswoman (2014–16), former wife of César Acuña
  - Richard Acuña Núñez, Congressman (2011–16), son of César Acuña and Carmen Rosa Núñez.

The Andrade family

- Alberto Andrade, Mayor of Miraflores (1990–96), Mayor of Lima (1996–2002) and Congressman (2006–09)
- Fernando Andrade, Mayor of Miraflores (1996–99 and 2003–06) and Congressman (2011–16)

The Bedoya family

- Luis Bedoya Reyes, Minister of Justice (1963), Mayor of Lima (1964–1969) and Member of the Constitutional Assembly (1978–79).
  - Luis Bedoya de Vivanco (Mayor of Miraflores (1984–89 and 1999–2011) and Constituent Congressman (1992–1995)), son of Luis Bedoya Reyes
  - Javier Bedoya de Vivanco (Deputy (1985–92) and Congressman (2006–16)), son of Luis Bedoya Reyes
    - Javier Bedoya Denegri (Vice-Mayor of San Isidro (2015–2018)), son of Javier Bedoya de Vivanco and grandson of Luis Bedoya Reyes

The Belaúnde/Diez Canseco family

- Pedro Diez Canseco (President of Peru, 1863, 1865, and 1868)
  - Víctor Andrés Belaúnde y Diez Canseco (Foreign Minister 1958; Pres. of the United Nations General Assembly, 1959), grandson of Pres. Pedro Diez Canseco
  - Rafael Belaúnde y Diez Canseco (Pres. of the Council of Ministers, 1945–46), grandson of Pres. Pedro Diez Canseco
    - Fernando Belaúnde Terry (President of Peru, 1963–68 and 1980–85), son of Rafael Belaúnde y Diez Canseco, nephew of Victor Andrés Belaunde y Diez Canseco
      - José Antonio García Belaúnde (Foreign Minister, 2006–2011), nephew of Pres. Fernando Beláunde Terry
      - Víctor Andrés García Belaúnde (Deputy, 1980–92, and Congressman, 2006–16), nephew of Pres. Fernando Belaúnde Terry
- Francisco Diez Canseco (President of Peru, 1872), brother of Pres. Pedro Diez Canseco
  - Manuel Yrigoyen Diez Canseco (Mayor of Lima 1919–20), grandnephew of Pres. Pedro Diez Canseco and Pres. Francisco Diez Canseco
    - Raul Diez Canseco Terry (First Vice President of Peru; resigned in 2004), great-great-grandnephew of Pres. Pedro Diez Canseco and Pres. Francisco Diez Canseco, first cousins twice removed of Manuel Yrigoyen Diez Canseco
    - Javier Diez Canseco (former congressman), great-great-grandnephew of Pres. Pedro Diez Canseco and Pres. Francisco Diez Canseco, first cousins twice removed of Manuel Yrigoyen Diez Canseco, first cousin of Raul Diez Canseco Terry

The Castañeda family

- Carlos Castañeda Iparraguirre, Mayor of Chiclayo
  - Luis Castañeda Lossio, (Mayor of Lima 2003–10 and 2015–18), son of Carlos Castañeda

The de la Riva-Agüero family

- José de la Riva Agüero (President of Peru, 1823)
  - José de la Riva-Agüero y Looz Corswaren (Foreign Minister, 1972–1975, Pres. of the Council of Ministers, 1873–74 and Pres. of the Senate, 1878), son of José de la Riva-Agüero
- Enrique de la Riva-Agüero y Looz Corswaren (Pres. of the Council of Ministers, 1899–1900 and 1915–1917)
- José de la Riva-Agüero y Osma (Pres. of the Council of Ministers and Justice Minister, 1933–34)

The Fujimori family

- Alberto Fujimori (President of Peru, 1990–2000)
- Susana Higuchi (First Lady 1990–94, Congresswoman 1995–2006), former wife of President Alberto Fujimori
  - Keiko Fujimori (President of Peru, 2026–present, First Lady 1994–2000, Congresswoman 2006–11), daughter of President Alberto Fujimori and Susana Higuchi
  - Kenji Fujimori (Congressman 2011–16), son of President Alberto Fujimori and Susana Higuchi
- Santiago Fujimori (Congressman 2006–11), brother of President Alberto Fujimori

The García family

- Carlos García Ronceros, Secretary General of the APRA
- Nytha Pérez of García, Founding member of the APRA
  - Alan García Pérez, President of Peru (1985–90 and 2006–11), Pres. of Constitutional Assembly (1978–1980), Deputy-President (1980–85) and member of Congress (1990–92)
  - Carla Buscaglia Castellano
  - ● Carla García Buscaglia
  - María Del Pilar Nores Bodereau
  - ●Josefina García Nores
  - ●Gabriela García Nores
  - ●Luciana García Nores
  - ●Alan Raul Simón García Nores
  - Roxanne Cheesman

The Morales-Bermúdez family

- Remigio Morales Bermúdez (President of Peru, 1890–94)
  - Francisco Morales Bermúdez (President of Peru, 1975–80), grandson of Pres. Remigio Morales Bermúdez

The Pardo family

- Manuel Pardo Ribadeneyra (Regent for King Fernando VII's, Cuzco, 1816–19)
  - Felipe Pardo y Aliaga (Foreign Minister, 1855), son of Manuel Pardo Ribadeneyra
    - Manuel Pardo y Lavalle, President of Peru, (1872–76), son of Felipe Pardo y Aliaga
      - José Pardo y Barreda, President of Peru, (1904–08 and 1915–19), Foreign Minister, son of Pres. Manuel Pardo y Lavalle
        - Juan Pardo Heeren (Finance Minister, 1963), son of Pres. Jose Pardo y Barreda
      - José Antonio de Lavalle y Pardo (Foreign Minister, 1882–83), nephew of Pres. Manuel Pardo y Lavalle and grandson of Felipe Pardo y Aliaga
      - Felipe de Osma y Pardo (Foreign Minister, 1891), nephew of Pres. Manuel Pardo y Lavalle and grandson of Felipe Pardo y Aliaga

The Prado family

- Mariano Ignacio Prado Ochoa (President of Peru, 1865, 1865–68 and 1876–79)
  - Javier Prado y Ugarteche (Prime Minister of Peru, 1910; son of Mariano Ignacio Prado)
  - Jorge Prado y Ugarteche (Prime Minister of Peru, 1933; son of Mariano Ignacio Prado)
  - Manuel Prado y Ugarteche (President of Peru, 1939–45 and 1956–62; son of Mariano Ignacio Prado)

The Schreiber/Arias Schreiber/Arias Stella family

- Germán Schreiber Waddington, Prime Minister of Peru (1910, 1914–1915)
  - Diómedes Arias Schreiber, Minister of Justice (1936, 1937–1939), Minister of the Interior (1939), nephew of Germán Schreiber Waddington
  - Ricardo Rivera Schreiber, Minister of Foreign Affairs (1952–1954), Ambassador of Peru to Spain (1943), Italy, and the United Kingdom (1949–1952), nephew of Germán Schreiber Waddington
    - Max Arias-Schreiber Pezet, Minister of Justice (1984), nephew of Diómedes Arias Schreiber and Ricardo Rivera Schreiber, and great-nephew of Germán Schreiber Waddington
    - Javier Arias Stella, Minister of Health (1963–1965, 1967–1968), Minister of Foreign Affairs (1980–1983), President of the United Nations Security Council (1984, 1985), cousin of Diómedes Arias Schreiber and Ricardo Rivera Schreiber, and great-nephew of Germán Schreiber Waddington

The Townsend family

- Andrés Townsend Ezcurra, Deputy (1963–68 and 80–85), Member of the Constitutional Assembly (1978–79) and Senator (1985–90).
  - Anel Townsend Diez Canseco (Congresswoman (1995–2006) and Minister of Woman's Affairs (2003)), daughter of Andrés Townsend

== Pitcairn Islands ==
The Christian family

- Fletcher Christian – founding "chief" (1789–93)
  - Steve Christian – Mayor (1999–2004); 7th generation descendant of Fletcher Christian; brother of Brenda Christian.
  - Brenda Christian – Mayor (2004); 7th generation descendant of Fletcher Christian; sister of Steve Christian.

== Poland ==
Poland is probably the only country in the world where identical twins were head of the government (Prime Minister) and head of state (President) at the same time.

The Adamowicz family (spouses)

- Paweł Adamowicz – mayor of Gdańsk (1998–2019)
- Magdalena Adamowicz – Member of the European Parliament (2019 onward)

The Banaś family (father and son)

- Marian Banaś – chairman of the Supreme Audit Office (2019 onward), Finance Minister (2019)
  - Jakub Banaś – Confederation candidate to Sejm in the 2023 election

The Bartoszewski family (father and son)

- Władysław Bartoszewski – Minister of Foreign Affairs (1995 and 2000–01), Senator (1997–2001), Secretary of State of the Prime Minister's Office (Sekretarz Stanu w Kancelarii Prezesa Rady Ministrów) in both Tusk cabinets (2007–15), ambassador to Austria (1990–95)
  - Władysław Teofil Bartoszewski – Member of Sejm (2019 onward), deputy chairman of the Foreign Affairs Committee (sejmowa Komisja Spraw Zagranicznych, 2022 onward)

The Bosak family (spouses)

- Krzysztof Bosak – presidential candidate (2020), Member of Sejm (2005–07 and 2019 onward), leader of All-Polish Youth (2005–06) and co-founder of the Confederation
- Karina Bosak – Member of Sejm (2023 onward)

The Fleszar-Zandberg family (great-grandaunt and great-grandnephew)

- Regina Fleszarowa – senator in the Second Polish Republic (1935–38), co-founder of the Alliance of Democrats, women's rights activist
  - Adrian Zandberg – Member of Sejm (2019 onward), co-leader of The Left, founder of Left Together

The Gajewska-Myrcha family (spouses)

- Kinga Gajewska – Member of Sejm (2015 onward)
- Arkadiusz Myrcha – Member of Sejm (2015 onward)

The Gierek family (father and son)

- Edward Gierek – First Secretary of the ruling Polish United Workers' Party (1970–80)
  - Adam Gierek – Member of the European Parliament (2004–19), Senator (2001–04)

The Giertych family (father, son, grandson)

- Jędrzej Giertych – political leader before WW2
  - Maciej Giertych – Member of the European Parliament (2004–09), Member of Sejm (2001–04)
    - Roman Giertych – Minister of National Education and Deputy Prime Minister (2006–07), founder of the League of Polish Families and All-Polish Youth

The Grabski family (brothers and great-granddaughter)

- Stanisław Grabski – politician leader before and after WW2
- Władysław Grabski – nationalist politician before WW2, Prime Minister of Poland (1920 and 1923–25),
  - Małgorzata Kidawa-Błońska – Senator (2023 onward), Marshal of Sejm (2015), presidential candidate (2020)

Also Stanisław Wojciechowski (president during 1922–26) is Kidawa-Błońska's another great-grandfather by his daughter's marriage to Władysław Grabski's son.

The Kaczyński family (identical twins)

- Jarosław Kaczyński – Prime Minister (2006–07), leader of Law and Justice (2001 onward)
- Lech Kaczyński – President of Poland (2005–10), mayor of Warsaw (2002–05)

The Kosiniak-Kamysz family (father, son, uncle)

- Andrzej Kosiniak-Kamysz – Minister of Health (1989–91) in the Mazowiecki cabinet
  - Władysław Kosiniak-Kamysz – Minister of Labour and Social Policy (2011–14) in the Tusk cabinet, Member of Sejm (2015 onward), presidential candidate (2020)
- Zenon Kosiniak-Kamysz – ambassador to Slovakia (2003–07), Canada (2010–13), and Singapore (2014–18)

The Libicki family (father and son)

- Marcin Libicki – Member of the European Parliament (2004–2009), Member of Sejm (1991–93 and 1997–2004)
  - Jan Filip Libicki – Senator (2011 onward), Member of Sejm (2005–11)

The Morawiecki family (father and son)

- Kornel Morawiecki – founder and leader of Fighting Solidarity, Member of Sejm (2015–19)
  - Mateusz Morawiecki – Prime Minister (2017–23)

The Nowacka family (mother and daughter)

- Izabela Jaruga-Nowacka – Minister of Social Policy and Deputy Prime Minister in the Belka cabinet (2004–05)
  - Barbara Nowacka – Member of Sejm (2019 onward), leader of the United Left coalition (2015)

The Piłsudski family (brothers)

- Józef Piłsudski – Chief of State (1918–22) and First Marshal of Poland (1920–23)
- Jan Piłsudski – Poland's Minister of Finance (1931–32), member of Sejm of the Republic of Central Lithuania (1922)

The Rokita family (husband and wife)

- Jan Rokita – Office of the Council of Ministers' chairman (1992–93; People's Republic equivalent to Prime Minister Chancellery), Member of Sejm (1989–2007)
- Nelli Rokita – Member of Sejm (2007–11), President advisor

The Sośnierz family (father and son)

- Andrzej Sośnierz – Member of Sejm (2005–11 and 2015–23), chairman of the NFZ (2006–07)
  - Dobromir Sośnierz – Member of the European Parliament (2018–19), Member of Sejm (2019–23)

The Śpiewak family (father, mother, son)

- Paweł Śpiewak – Member of Sejm (2005–07)
- Helena Datner – Jewish activist
  - Jan Śpiewak – local government activist, candidate for the mayor of Warsaw (2018), housing rights advocate

The Wałęsa family (father and son)

- Lech Wałęsa – President (1990–95)
  - Jarosław Wałęsa – Member of Sejm (2005–09 and 2019 onward), Member of the European Parliament (2009–19)

The Wassermann family (father and daughter)

- Zbigniew Wassermann – Member of Sejm (2001–10), minister in the Marcinkiewicz and Kaczyński cabinets
  - Małgorzata Wassermann – Member of Sejm (2015 onward)

== Portugal ==
The Carmona and Carmona Rodrigues family (granduncle-grandnephew)

- Óscar Carmona – Head of State
  - António Carmona Rodrigues – Minister of the Public Works, Transportation, and Habitation (2003–04); Mayor of Lisbon (interim) (2004–05); Mayor of Lisbon (2005–07)

The Soares family (father-son)

- Mário Soares – Prime Minister (1976–78; 1983–85)
  - João Soares – Mayor of Lisbon (1995–2001)

The Portas family (father-brothers)

- Nuno Portas – Minister (1970s)
  - Paulo Portas – Minister of State and National Defense (2002–05); former president of Popular Party (1998–2005); Minister of State and Foreign Affairs (2011–2013); Deputy Prime-Minister (2013–2015)
  - Miguel Portas – European Parliament Member, elected by the Left Bloc (2004–12)

The Marques Mendes family (father-brothers)

- António Marques Mendes – Mayor of Fafe (1989–1997); Member of Parliament (1976–1980; 1983–1995); MEP (1987–1994)
  - Luís Marques Mendes – Member of Parliament (1995–2007), Ministry of Parliamentary Affairs (2002–2004); President of the Social Democratic Party (2005–2007); Member of the Council of State (2011–2015; 2016–)
  - Clara Marques Mendes – Member of Parliament (2011–2024), Secretary of State for Social Action and Inclusion (2024–)

The Mendonça Mendes family (brother-sister)

- Ana Catarina Mendes – Ministry of Parliamentary Affairs (2022–2024); MEP (2024–)
- António Mendonça Mendes – Secretary of State of Finances; Member of Parliament (2024–)

The Menezes family (father-son)

- Luís Filipe Menezes – Mayor of Gaia (1997–2013)
  - Luís Menezes – Member of Parliament (2009–2014)

The Mortágua family (sisters)

- Mariana Mortágua – Member of Parliament (2015–25)
- Joana Mortágua – Coordinator of the Left Bloc (2023–), Member of Parliament (2013–)

The Vieira da Silva family (father-daughter)

- José António Vieira da Silva – Minister of Economy, Innovation and Development (2009–2011); Minister of Labour, Solidarity and Social Security (2005–2009, 2015–2019)
  - Mariana Vieira da Silva – Minister of Presidency and Administrative Modernization (2018–2019); Minister of State and Presidency (2019–)

The Cabrita-Vitorino family (husband-wife)

- Eduardo Cabrita – Deputy Minister (2015–2017); Minister of Internal Administration (2017–2019, 2019–)
- Ana Paula Vitorino – Minister of Sea (2015–2019); Member of Parliament (2019–)

== Puerto Rico ==
The Calderón family

- Sila María Calderón Serra (Governor, 2001–05)
- Sila María González Calderón, member of the Puerto Rican Senate

The Hernandez family

- José Alfredo Hernández Mayoral (former governor candidate)
- Juan Eugenio Hernández Mayoral (member of Puerto Rico's Senate)
- Rafael Hernández Colón (Governor, 1973–77, 1985–93)

The Muñoz family

- Luis Muñoz Rivera (Resident Commissioner, 4 March 1911 – 15 November 1916)
- Luis Muñoz Marín (Governor, 1948–64)
- Victoria Muñoz Mendoza (former governor candidate)

The Rivera family

- Ramón Luis Rivera Jr. (mayor of Bayamón)
- Ramón Luis Rivera Sr. (former mayor of Bayamón)

The Pesquera family

- Lic. Rafael A Pesquera Reguero (former municipal assembly member of Bayamón, former member of Puerto Rico's Senate)
- Dr. Carlos Ignacio Pesquera Morales (former Secretary of Transportation And Public Works, former governor candidate)
- Farrique Pesquera Morales (former Vice President of a Puerto Rican Independence Party municipal party committee)
- Lic.José Lorenzo Pesquera (Resident Commissioner of Puerto Rico)
- Santiago Mari Pesquera (a assassinated pro independence activist)
- Paquita Pesquera Cantellops (activist, mother of Santiago Mari and founder of Puerto Rican Independence Party)
- Carlos Pesquera (former Ombudsman)
- Lic. José Feliú Pesquera (Founder of "Renovación Cristiana" Party)
- Jorge Pesquera (former Secretary of Tourism)
- Dr. Héctor Luis Pesquera Sevillano (co-president of Hostosian National Independence Movement)
- Hector Pesquera (Police Chief)

The Romero family

- Melinda Romero Donnelly (ex member of Puerto Rico's Senate)
- Carlos Romero Barceló (Governor)

The Roselló family

- Pedro Rosselló (Governor, 4 January 2005 – 2 January 2009)
- Ricky Rosselló (Governor, 2 January 2017 – 2 August 2019)

== Romania ==
The Brătianu family

- Dimitrie Brătianu (Prime Minister, 1881)
- Ion Brătianu (Prime Minister, 1876–81, 1881–88) (brother)
  - Ionel Brătianu (Prime Minister, 1909–11, 1914–18, 1918–19, 1922–26, 1927) (son of Ion Brătianu)
    - Gheorghe I. Brătianu (Leader of the National Liberal Party-Brătianu, 1930–1938) (son of Ionel Brătianu)
  - Vintilă Brătianu (Prime Minister 1927–28) (son of Ion Brătianu)
  - Dinu Brătianu (Finance Minister, 1933–34) (son of Ion Brătianu)

The Băsescu family (father, daughter, brother)

- Traian Băsescu (President, 2004–2014)
- Elena Băsescu (member of European Parliament, 2009–2014), daughter of Traian, elected by her father's party while he was President
- Mircea Băsescu, brother of Traian, in jail for corruption (extorsion of money from a mobster chief for promises of justice abuse by his brother's power)

The Ponta-Sârbu family (husband, wife, father-in-law)

- Victor Ponta (Prime Minister, 2012–2015)
- Daciana Sârbu (Member of European Parliament)
- Ilie Sârbu (Senator, President of the Senate, Minister of Agriculture)

== Russia / Soviet Union ==
The Artyukhov family

- Andrey Artyukhov (b. 1958) Senator from Tyumen Oblast (2002–05), Member of the Tyumen Oblast Duma (since 2007)
  - Dmitry Artyukhov (b. 1988) Governor of Yamalo-Nenets Autonomous Okrug, son of Andrey Artyukhov

The Brezhnev-Churbanov family

- Leonid Brezhnev (1906–82) Leader of the Soviet Union (1964–82)
  - Yuri Brezhnev (1933–2013) First Deputy Minister of Foreign Trade of the USSR, son of Leonid Brezhnev
    - Andrey Brezhnev (1961–2018) First Secretary of the Communist Party of Social Justice (2014–16), son of Yuri Brezhnev
  - Yuri Churbanov (1936–2013) Deputy of Ministers of Interior of the USSR, son-in-law of Leonid Brezhnev

The Budyonny-Peskov family

- Semyon Budyonny
    - Dmitry Peskov, granddaughter's husband

The Glazyev-Sinelin-Vityazeva family (brothers-in-law, alumni, co-partisans)

- Sergei Glazyev
- Mikhail Sinelin, Head of the Secretariat of the Chairman of the Government of the Russian Federation
- Yuliya Glazyeva-Sinelina, prime Russian sociology of religion guru (1972–2013)
- Yuliya Lozanova-Vityazeva, Ukrainian-Russian propagandist (1981-)
- Oxana Gomzik-Glazyeva, Russian politician (1972-)

The Gorbachev family

- Mikhail Gorbachev (b. 1931–2022) (Communist Party General Secretary, Chairman of the Presidium of the Supreme Soviet, Chairman of the Supreme Soviet, and President of the Soviet Union)
- Raisa Gorbacheva (1932–99) (First Lady of the Soviet Union who took on a large political and public role, unlike her virtually invisible predecessors), wife of Mikhail Gorbachev

The Kadyrov family

- Akhmad Kadyrov (1951–2004) 1st President of the Chechen Republic (2003–2004)
  - Ramzan Kadyrov (b. 1976) 3rd Head of the Chechen Republic (since 2007), son of Akhmad Kadyrov
    - Khamzat Kadyrov (b. 1997), Deputy Prime Minister of Chechnya, Advisor-Assistant for the Security Bloc, Minister of Property and Land Relations, Head of the Administration of the Kurchaloyevsky District, Minister of Physical Culture and Sports, Member of the Presidium of the Regional Political Council of United Russia, son of Ramzan Kadyrov.
    - Aishat Kadyrova (b. 1998), Deputy Prime Minister of Chechnya (2023–2025) and Chechen Minister of Culture (2021–2023), daughter of Ramzan Kadyrov.
    - Akhmad Kadyrov Jr. (b. 2005), Chechen Minister for Physical Culture and Sports (since 2024), Chechen Minister of Youth Affairs (2024), son of Ramzan Kadyrov.
    - Adam Kadyrov (b. 2007), Head of the Security Service of the President of the Chechen Republic (since 2023), son of Ramzan Kadyrov.
  - Khas-Magomed Kadyrov (b. 1991), Mayor of Grozny (since 2021), Mayor of Argun (2019–2020), relative (allegedly, cousin, or nephew) of Ramzan Kadyrov.
  - Adam Delimkhanov (b. 1969), Member of the State Duma (since 2007), Deputy Prime Minister of Chechnya (2006–2007), relative (allegedly, cousin) of Ramzan Kadyrov.
    - Alibek Delimkhanov (b. 1974), Deputy Head of the North Caucasian National Guard District (since 2018), brother of Adam Delimkhanov.
    - Sharip Delimkhanov (b. 1980), Head of the Russian National Guard Directorate for the Chechen Republic (since 2016), brother of Adam Delimkhanov.

The Khristenko-Golikova family

- Viktor Khristenko (b. 1957) Minister of Industry and Trade of Russian Federation, husband of Tatyana Golikova
- Tatyana Golikova (b. 1966) Minister of Health and Social Development of Russian Federation, wife of Viktor Khristenko

The Kokov family

- Valery Kokov (1941–2005) 1st President of Kabardino-Balkaria (1992–2005)
  - Kazbek Kokov (b. 1973) 4th Head of Kabardino-Balkaria (since 2018), son of Valery Kokov

The Kondratenko family

- Nikolai Kondratenko (1940–2013) Governor of Krasnodar Krai (1997–2001)
  - Alexey Kondratenko (b. 1969) Senator from Krasnodar Krai (since 2015), Member of the Legislative Assembly of Krasnodar Krai (2007–2015), son of Nikolai Kondratenko

The Kosygin-Primakov family (somebodies-in-law via two marriages)

- Alexei Kosygin (1904–80) (Premier of the Soviet Union)
  - Germen Gvishiani (1928–2003) (Professor), son of a former NKVD Lieutenant General, son-in-law of Alexei Kosygin
  - Yevgeny Primakov (1929–2015) (Foreign Minister in 1996–98 and Prime Minister of Russia in 1998–99), brother-in-law of Germen Gvishiani
    - Yevgeny Primakov Jr. (b. 1976) (Member of the State Duma since 2018), grandson of Yevgeny Primakov

The Lebed family

- Alexander Lebed (1950–2002) 1996 Russian presidential candidate, Secretary of the Security Council (1996), Governor of Krasnoyarsk Krai (1998–2002), brother of Aleksey Lebed
- Aleksey Lebed (1955–2019) Head of Khakassia (1997–2009), brother of Alexander Lebed

The Magomedov family

- Magomedali Magomedov (b. 1930) 1st President of Dagestan (1994–2006)
  - Magomedsalam Magomedov (b. 1964) 3rd Head of Dagestan (2010–2013), son of Magomedali Magomedov

The Patrushev family

- Nikolai Patrushev (b. 1951) Secretary of the Security Council of Russia (since 2008), Director of the Federal Security Service (1999–2008)
  - Dmitry Patrushev (b. 1977) Minister of Agriculture (since 2018), son of Nikolai Patrushev

The Sobchak-Narusova family

- Anatoly Sobchak (1937–2000) (mayor of Saint Petersburg)
- Lyudmila Narusova (b. 1951) (senator and MP), widow of Anatoly Sobchak
  - Ksenia Sobchak (b. 1981), 2018 Russian presidential candidate, daughter of Anatoly Sobchak and Lyudmila Narusova

The Shoigu family

- Kuzhuget Shoigu (1921–2010) First Deputy Prime Minister of Tuvan ASSR
  - Sergey Shoygu (b. 1955), Secretary of the Security Council of Russia (since 2024), Russian Minister of Defense (2012–2024), Governor of Moscow Oblast (2012) and Minister of Emergency Situations, son of Kuzhuget Shoigu
    - Yulia Shoigu (b. 1977) Director of Center of Emergency Psychological Aid of EMERCOM of Russia (since 2002), daughter of Sergey Shoigu
  - Larisa Shoigu (1953–2021) Member of the State Duma between 2007 and 2021, daughter of Kuzhuget Shoigu

The Stalin-Zhdanov family (fathers of spouses)

- Joseph Stalin (1878–1953) (Soviet leader)
- Andrey Zhdanov (1896–1948) (member of the Politburo of the Central Committee of the Communist Party of the Soviet Union)
  - Svetlana Alliluyeva (1926–2011), daughter of Joseph Stalin, daughter-in-law of Andrey Zhdanov

The Tkachov family

- Alexey Tkachov (b. 1957) Member of the State Duma (since 2003), brother of Alexander Tkachov
- Alexander Tkachov (b. 1960) Minister of Agriculture (2015–18), Governor of Krasnodar Krai (2001–15), brother of Alexey Tkachov
  - Roman Batalov (b. 1985) Member of the Legislative Assembly of Krasnodar Krai (2007–2017), son-in-law of Alexander Tkachov

The Tolstoy family

- Ivan A. Tolstoy (1644–1713) Azov Governor (1702–1711)
- Pyotr A. Tolstoy (1645–1729) Chief of the Secret and Investigative Affairs Office (1718–1726), Member of the Supreme Privy Council (1726–1727), brother of Ivan A. Tolstoy
  - Dmitry N. Tolstoy (1806–1884) Ryazan Governor (1856), Kaluga Governor (1856–1858), Voronezh Governor (1859–1861), great-grandson of Pyotr A. Tolstoy
- Alexander V. Tolstoy (1738–1815) Simbirsk Governor (1797–1799)
- Ilya A. Tolstoy (1757–1820) Kazan Governor (1815–1820)
- Dmitry Tolstoy (1823–1889) Interior Minister of Russia (1882–1889), Education Minister of Russia (1866–1880)
- Alexander N. Tolstoy (1878–1919) Vilna Governor (1916–1917), Saint Petersburg Vice Governor (1910–1915)
  - Mikhail Nikitich Tolstoy (born 1940) People's Deputy of Russia (1990–1993), Member of the Legislative Assembly of Saint Petersburg (1994–2002), great-nephew of Alexander N. Tolstoy
- Dmitry A. Tolstoy (1754–1832) Mogilev Governor (1812–1819)
  - Mikhail D. Tolstoy (1804–1891) Member of the Odessa City Duma, son of Dmitry A. Tolstoy
    - Mikhail Tolstoy II (1835–1898) Member of the Odessa City Duma, son of Mikhail D. Tolstoy
      - Mikhail Tolstoy III (1863–1927) Member of the Odessa City Duma, son of Mikhail Tolstoy II
- Pyotr A. Tolstoy (1770–1844) Russian Ambassadors to France (1807–1808), brother of Dmitry A. Tolstoy
  - Alexander P. Tolstoy (1801–1873) Tver Governor (1834–1837), son of Pyotr A. Tolstoy
- Ivan I. Tolstoy (1858–1916) Education Minister of Russia (1905–1906)
- Alexander G. Tolstoy Tobolsk Governor (1795–1797)
- Alexander P. Tolstoy (1863–after 1917) Member of the State Duma (1907–1912)
  - Pyotr P. Tolstoy (1870–1918) Member of the State Duma (1906), young brother of Alexander P. Tolstoy
- Pyotr O. Tolstoy (born 1969) Member of the State Duma (2016–present)
- Vladimir I. Tolstoy (born 1962) Culture Advisor to the President of Russia (2012–2024)

The Trotsky-Kamenev family (brothers-in-law)

- Leon Trotsky (1879–1940) (People's Commissar for Foreign Affairs, People's Commissar for Army and Navy Affairs)
- Lev Kamenev (1883–1936) (Chairman of the Central Executive Committee of the All-Russian Congress of Soviets), brother-in-law of Trotsky

The Udaltsov family

- Ivan Udaltsov (1918–95) Soviet Ambassador to Greece (1976–79)
  - Alexander Udaltsov (b. 1951) Russian Ambassador to Lithuania (since 2013), Slovakia (2005–2010) and Latvia (1996–2001), son of Ivan Udaltsov
    - Sergey Udaltsov (b. 1977) leader of Left Front, grandson of Ivan Udaltsov and nephew of Alexander Udaltsov

The Vorobyov family

- Yury Vorobyov (b. 1948) Senator from Vologda Oblast (since 2007)
  - Andrey Vorobyov (b. 1970) Governor of Moscow Oblast (since 2012), son of Yury Vorobyov

The Yeltsin family (father-in-law and son-in-law)

- Boris Yeltsin, President of Russia (1991–99)
  - Tatyana Yeltsin-Yumasheva (b. 1960), daughter of Boris Yeltsin
  - Valentin Yumashev (b. 1957), chief of the Presidential administration of Russia, husband of Tatyana
    - Oleg Deripaska (b. 1968) (one of the richest Russian citizens), son-in-law of Valentin Yumashev (by the former marriage)

The Zhirinovsky-Lebedev family

- Vladimir Zhirinovsky (b. 1946) Leader of the Liberal Democratic Party of Russia (since 1992), Member of the State Duma since 1993, 6 times Russian presidential candidate
  - Igor Lebedev (b. 1972) Member of the State Duma 1999–2021, son of Vladimir Zhirinovsky

The Zubkov-Serdyukov family (father-in-law and son-in-law)

- Viktor Zubkov (b. 1941) (Prime Minister of Russia September 2007 – May 2008)
  - Anatoliy Serdyukov (b. 1962) (Defence Minister of the Russian Federation from February 2007), son-in-law of Viktor Zubkov
  - Zhukov daughter and vasilevski son spouses
  - Lebed brothers

The Zyuganov family

- Gennady Zyuganov (b. 1944) Leader of the Communist Party of the Russian Federation (since 1993), Member of the State Duma since 1993, four times Russian presidential candidate
  - Leonid Zyuganov (b. 1988) Member of the Moscow City Duma since 2014, grandson of Gennady Zyuganov

== Rwanda ==
The Habyarimana family and Kayibanda family

- Grégoire Kayibanda (former President)
- Juvénal Habyarimana (Godfather of Kayibanda's son; former President)
- Agathe Habyarimana (wife of Juvénal Habyarimana and partner-in-power)

== Saint Lucia ==
The Cenac family (brother)

- Winston Cenac (Prime Minister of Saint Lucia, 1981–82)
- Neville Cenac (Foreign Minister, 1987–92)

The Lewis family (father-son)

- Sir Allen Lewis (Governor-General of Saint Lucia, 1979–80 and 1982–87)
  - Vaughan Lewis (Prime Minister of Saint Lucia, 1996–97)

== Samoa ==
The Mataʻafa family

- Fiamē Mataʻafa Faumuina Mulinuʻu II (Prime Minister)
  - Fiamē Naomi Mataʻafa (daughter; Prime Minister)

== São Tomé and Príncipe ==
The Costa Alegre family

- Norberto Costa Alegre (Prime Minister, 1992–94)
- Alda Bandeira (wife of Norberto Costa Alegre; Foreign Minister, 1991–93 and 2002)

The Trovoada family (father-son)

- Miguel Trovoada (President, 1991–2001)
  - Patrice Trovoada (Prime Minister, 2008 and 2010–present)

== Senegal ==
The Wade family (father-son)

- Abdoulaye Wade (President of Senegal, 2000–12)
  - Karim Wade (Energy minister)

== Serbia ==
The Krkobabić family of the Party of United Pensioners of Serbia

- Jovan Krkobabić (Deputy Prime Minister of Serbia, 2008–2014)
  - Milan Krkobabić (Minister in the Government of Serbia, 2016–present)
    - Stefan Krkobabić (Member of the National Assembly of Serbia, 2020–present)

== Seychelles ==
The Ferrari family

- Maxime Ferrari (opposition leader)
  - Jean-François Ferrari (son of Maxime Ferrari; Seychelles National Party activist)
  - Pauline Ferrari (daughter of Maxime Ferrari)

== Sierra Leone ==
The Margai brothers

- Milton Margai (Prime Minister, 1961–64)
- Albert Margai (Prime Minister, 1964–67)

== Singapore ==
The Lee family (Singapore)

- Lee Kuan Yew (Prime Minister of Singapore, 1959–1990)
  - Lee Hsien Loong (son of Lee Kuan Yew; Prime Minister of Singapore, 2004–2024)

The Ong family (Singapore)

- Ong Lian Teng (Legislative Assemblyman for Bukit Panjang Constituency, 1963–1966)
  - Ong Ye Kung (son; Minister of Health, 2021)
  - Xie Yao Quan (nephew; Member of Parliament, 2020)

The Fong family (Singapore)

- Fong Sip Chee (Minister of State for Culture, 1981–1985)
  - Arthur Fong (son; Member of Parliament, 2001–2015)

== Slovenia ==
The Kardelj-Maček family

- Edvard Kardelj (1910–1979) Member of Presidency of Yugoslavia (1974–1979), President of the Federal Assembly of Yugoslavia (1963–1967), Deputy Prime Minister of Yugoslavia (1946–1963), Minister of Foreign Affairs of Yugoslavia (1948–1953)
  - Igor Šoltes (1964–, grandson of Edvard Kardelj) President of the Court of Auditors (2004–2013), Member of the European Parliament (2014–2019)
- Pepca Kardelj (1914–1990, wife of Edvard Kardelj)
- Ivan Maček – Matija (1908–1993, brother Pepca Kardelj, brother-in-law of Edvard Kardelj) President of the People's Assembly of SR Slovenia (1963–1967), Deputy Prime Minister and Minister of Interior of SR Slovenia (1945–1953), Member of Federal Yugoslav Government (1953–1963)

The Oman-Podobnik family

- Ivan Oman (1929–2019) Member of the Presidency of Slovenia (1990–1992), Member of the National Assembly of Slovenia (1992–1996)
  - Marjan Podobnik (1960–, son-in-law of Ivan Oman) Deputy Prime Minister of Slovenia (1996–2000), Member of the National Assembly of Slovenia (1990–1996)
  - Janez Podobnik (1959–, brother of Marjan Podobnik) Speaker of the National Assembly (1996–2000), Minister of Environment and Spatial Planning (2004–2008), Member of the National Assembly (1992–2000), Mayor of idrija (1990–1994), Mayor of Cerkno (1994–1998)

== Solomon Islands ==
The Chan family (father–son)

- Tommy Chan (Member of Parliament and businessman)
  - Laurie Chan Foreign Minister, 2002–2006)

The Kemakeza family (siblings)

- Sir Allan Kemakeza (Prime Minister of the Solomon Islands, 2001–2006, Member of Parliament 1989–2010)
- Ataban Tonezepo (brother of Sir Allan Kemakeza; Premier of Central province)

The Kenilorea family (father–son)

- Peter Kenilorea, Prime Minister of the Solomon Islands (1978–1981, 1984–1986)
  - Peter Kenilorea Jr. (son), Member of Parliament (since 2019)

== Somalia ==
The “Barre” Family

- Mohammed Siad Barre 3rd. (President;69–91)
- Abdirahman Jama Barre (Foreign Minister, 1977–87)
- Maslah Siad Barre

The “Sharmarke” Bands Family

- Abdirashid Ali Shermarke (President; 67–69)
- Omar Abdirashid Ali Sharmarke (Prime Minister: 09–10)

== Spain ==
- The Abascal family
  - Santiago Abascal Escuza, member of the Congress of Deputies (2003–04)
    - Santiago Abascal Conde (son), member of the Congress of Deputies (2019–present)
- The Aznar–Botella family
  - Manuel Aznar Zubigaray (Echalar, Navarra, 1894 – Madrid, 1975) Basque nationalist journalist, joined the Nationalist military revolt during the Spanish Civil War and joined Falange Española, father of:
    - Manuel (Imanol) Aznar Acedo (1916–2001), Falangist journalist, father of:
      - José María Aznar, fourth Prime Minister of Spain from 1996 to 2004 relative of:
        - Ana Botella (wife) mayor of Madrid from 2011 to 2015
- The Calvo-Sotelo family
  - José Calvo Sotelo, Minister of Finance during the dictatorship of Primo de Rivera (1925–30)
    - Leopoldo Calvo-Sotelo (nephew), second Prime minister of Spain (1981–82)
- The Sagaseta de Ilurdoz–Espinosa de los Monteros–Alcalá-Galiano–Villavicencio–Bouligny–Bernaldo de Quirós–Monasterio family
  - Ángel Sagaseta de Ilurdoz Garraza, member of the Royal Council of Navarra
    - Carlos Espinosa de los Monteros y Sagaseta de Ilurdoz (grandson), Civil Governor of Barcelona (1902–03) and ambassador of Spain to France (1914–15)
      - Eugenio Espinosa de los Monteros (son), ambassador of Spain to the German Reich (1940–41)
      - Fernando Espinosa de los Monteros y Bermejillo (son), undersecretary of the Ministry of State (1921–25)
      - Carlos Espinosa de los Monteros y Bermejillo (son), Minister of Justice, Public Instruction and Worship of the Saarland Government (1924)
        - Carlos Espinosa de los Monteros y Bernaldo de Quirós (grandson), High Commissioner of the Government for Brand Spain (2012–18)
          - Emilio Alcalá-Galiano, 4th Count of Casa Valencia (great-grandfather), Minister of State (1875) and ambassador of Spain to the United Kingdom (1895–97)
            - Antonio Alcalá Galiano (father), Minister of the Navy (1836) and Minister of Public Works (1865)
              - Juan María Villavicencio y de la Serna (uncle), regent of Spain (1812–13)
                - Juan de Bouligny (father-in-law), ambassador and minister plenipotentiary in Constantinople (1787–93)
            - Juan Valera y Alcalá-Galiano (cousin), member of the Senate, ambassador of Spain to the United States (1883–86) and ambassador of Spain to the Austro-Hungarian Empire (1893–95)
          - Jesús Bernaldo de Quirós (grandfather), member of the Restoration Courts (1910–14)
            - José María Bernaldo de Quirós y González de Cienfuegos (father), minister plenipotentiary in Saint Petersburg, Constantinople and Athens
          - Iván Espinosa de los Monteros (son), member of the Congress of Deputies (2019–23)
            - Rocío Monasterio (wife), member of the Assembly of Madrid (2019–24)
- The Garriga family
  - Joan Garriga Doménech, member of the Parliament of Catalonia (2021–present)
    - Ignacio Garriga (cousin), member of the Congress of Deputies (2019–21) and member of the Parliament of Catalonia (2021–present)
- The González–Romero family
  - Felipe González, third Prime minister of Spain (1982–96)
    - Carmen Romero López (ex-wife), member of the European Parliament (2009–14)
- The Primo de Rivera family – is a Spanish military family prominent in politics of the 19th and 20th centuries:
  - Joaquín Primo de Rivera y Pérez de Acal (1734–†1800), serviceman and Spanish Colonial Governor of Maracaibo (Venezuela), father of:
    - Joaquín Primo de Rivera y Ortiz de Pinedo (1786–†1819), Spanish Colonel, fought in the Peninsular War against the French and in the Spanish American wars of independence against the Army of the Andes in Chile;
    - José Primo de Rivera y Ortiz de Pinedo (1777–†1853), Serviceman and Congressmen, father of:
      - Fernando Primo de Rivera y Sobremonte (1831–†1921), Serviceman and Politician;
      - Miguel Primo de Rivera y Sobremonte (1826–†1898), Serviceman, father of:
        - Fernando Primo de Rivera y Orbaneja (1879–†1921), Serviceman;
        - Miguel Primo de Rivera y Orbaneja (1870–†1930), Serviceman, Politician and Dictator of Spain. Father of:
          - José Antonio Primo de Rivera y Sáenz de Heredia (1903–†1936), polítician during the Spanish Second Republic, founded the fascist Falange Española party;
          - Pilar Primo de Rivera y Sáenz de Heredia (1907–†1991), Leader of the women's section of the Falange Española;
          - Miguel Primo de Rivera y Sáenz de Heredia (1904–†1964), Minister during the regime of Francisco Franco;
          - Fernando Primo de Rivera y Sáenz de Heredia (1908–†1936), father of:
            - Miguel Primo de Rivera y Urquijo (1934–†2018), Mayor of Jerez de la Frontera (1965–71) during the regime of Francisco Franco
- The Suárez family
  - Adolfo Suárez, first Prime minister of Spain (1975–81)
    - Adolfo Suárez Illana, Politician
- The Utrera–Ruiz-Gallardón–Jiménez–Ciganer-Albéniz–Sarkozy–Peretti family
  - José Utrera Molina, Minister of Housing (1973) and Minister-secretary general of the Movement (1974–75) during the regime of Francisco Franco
    - Alberto Ruiz-Gallardón (son-in-law), President of the Community of Madrid (1995–2003), Mayor of Madrid (2003–11) and Minister of Justice (2011–14)
      - Trinidad Jiménez (third aunt of Alberto Ruiz-Gallardón), Minister of Health and Social Policy and Equality (2009–10) and Minister of Foreign Affairs and Cooperation (2010–11)
      - Carlos Jiménez Villarejo (second great-uncle of Alberto Ruiz-Gallardón, uncle of Trinidad Jiménez), member of the European Parliament (2014)
      - Cécilia Ciganer-Albéniz (third cousin of Alberto Ruiz-Gallardón), First Lady of France (2007)
        - Nicolas Sarkozy (ex-husband of Cécilia Ciganer-Albéniz), 23rd President of France (2007–12)
          - Jean Sarkozy (son of Nicolas Sarkozy), politician
            - Achille Peretti (great-uncle of Jean Sarkozy), President of the National Assembly (1969–73)
- The Vega de Seoane–Aguirre–Gil de Biedma family
  - Baldomero Vega de Seoane, politician
    - Esperanza Aguirre (great-granddaughter), Minister of Education, Culture and Sport (1996–99), President of the Senate (1999–2002) and President of the Community of Madrid (2003–12)
      - José Luis Aguirre Matos (grandfather of Esperanza Aguirre), politician
      - José Gil de Biedma (grandfather of Esperanza Aguirre), politician

== Syria ==
The Assad family

- Hafez al-Assad (President of Syria, 1971—2000)
  - Bashar al-Assad (son of Hafez al-Assad; President of Syria, 2000–2024)
  - Maher al-Assad (son of Hafez al-Assad)
  - Bassel al-Assad (son of Hafez al-Assad)
- Rifaat al-Assad (brother of Hafez al-Assad)

The Atassi family

- Hashim al-Atassi
- Nureddin al-Atassi

The al-Azm family

- Khalid al-Azm
- Haqqi al-Azm

The Sharaa family

- Ahmed al-Sharaa (President of Syria, 2025—present)
- Hussein al-Sharaa (father of Ahmed al-Sharaa)
  - Maher al-Sharaa (brother of Ahmed al-Shara)
  - Hazem al-Sharaa (older brother of Ahmed al-Sharaa)
  - Jamal al-Sharaa (elder brother of Ahmed al-Sharaa)

== Sweden ==
House of Bernadotte

- Folke Bernadotte diplomat and politician and he is noted for his negotiation for the release of prisoners from the German concentration camps in World War II, grandson of King Oscar II and nephew of King Gustaf V.

Bildt family

- Gillis Bildt (1820–94), Swedish independent Conservative politician, Prime Minister of Sweden 1888–89.
  - Knut Gillis Bildt, Swedish Army general, member of parliament for eight years.
    - Carl Bildt, leader of the Swedish Liberal Conservative Moderate Party 1986–99, Prime Minister of Sweden 1991–94, European Union Special Envoy to Former Yugoslavia 1995 and Minister for Foreign Affairs 2006–14, former son-in-law of Gösta Bohman, great-great-grandson of Gillis Bildt.
    - Anna Maria Corazza Bildt, Italian-Swedish Liberal Conservative Moderate Party politician, Member of the European Parliament since 2009, wife of Carl Bildt

Bodström family

- Lennart Bodström, social democratic Minister for Foreign Affairs 1982–85 and Minister for Education 1985–89.
  - Thomas Bodström, social democratic Minister for Justice 2000–06, son of Lennart Bodström

Bohman family

- Gösta Bohman, leader of the Swedish Liberal Conservative Moderate Party from 1970 to 1981, Minister for the Economy 1976–78 and 1979–81
  - Mia Bohman, Swedish Liberal Conservative Moderate Party politician, former wife of Carl Bildt, daughter of Gösta Bohman

Cederschiöld family

- Carl Cederschiöld, Conservative Mayor of Stockholm 1991–94 and 1998–2002
- Charlotte Cederschiöld, Conservative Member of Parliament 1988–95 and Member of the European Parliament 1995–2009, married to Carl Cederschiöld
  - Sebastian Cederschiöld, Conservative Member of Parliament 2006, son of Charlotte and Carl Cederschiöld

De Geer family

- Louis De Geer the elder (1818–96), Justice Prime Minister 1858–70, Prime Minister of Sweden 1876–80
  - Louis De Geer the younger (1854–1935), Prime Minister of Sweden 1920–1921, son of Louis De Geer the elder
  - Gerard De Geer (1858–1943), Member of Parliament 1900–05, son of Louis De Geer the older
    - Gerard De Geer (1889–1980), liberal Member of Parliament 1937–43 and 1951–58, grandson of a brother to Louis De Geer the elder
      - Lars De Geer (1922–2002), liberal Minister of Defence 1978–79, son of Gerard De Geer (1889–1980)

Douglas family

- Gustaf Douglas, member of the board of Swedish Liberal Conservative Moderate Party 2002–14.
- Walburga Habsburg Douglas, Swedish Liberal Conservative Moderate Party Member of Parliament 2006–14.

Hammarskjöld family

- Hjalmar Hammarskjöld, Prime Minister of Sweden 1914–17
  - Dag Hammarskjöld, cabinet minister without portfolio 1951–53, UN Secretary General 1953–61, son of Hjalmar Hammarskjöld

Heckscher family

- Gunnar Heckscher, Conservative Party leader 1961–65
  - Sten Heckscher, social democratic Minister of Industry and Employment 1994–96, son of Gunnar Heckscher

Leijon family

- Anna-Greta Leijon, Social Democratic cabinet minister 1973–76 and 1982–88
  - Britta Lejon, Social Democratic cabinet minister 1998–2002, Member of Parliament 2002–06, daughter of Anna-Greta Leijon

Lieven family

- Baron Reinhold Lieven, major-general of the Swedish Infantry, governor of Ösel (Saaremaa), commander of Arensburg castle, appointed governor of Helsingfors (Helsinki).
- Count Hans Henrik von Liewen, page, Chamberlain of His Majesty, Commander of the Order of the Sword, Imperial Councilor, Governor General of Swedish Pomerania, Marshal of the Realm, Marshal of the Royal Household, Member of the Royal Swedish Academy of Sciences, Knight of the Order of the Seraphim.
- Countess Henrica Juliana Lieven, lady-in-waiting of crown-princess Louisa Ulrika, participated in the founding of the conservative Hats party and was an anonymous editor of An honest Swede, Sweden’s first political magazine. Countess Lieven is believed to be the informant to expose the first planned coup of Louisa Ulrika to the ambassadors of Denmark, France and Russia in 1748.

Myrdal family

- Gunnar Myrdal, Social Democratic cabinet minister 1945–47
- Alva Myrdal, Social Democratic cabinet minister 1966–73, wife of Gunnar Myrdal
  - Jan Myrdal, author and independent communist political writer and columnist, son of Alva and Gunnar Myrdal

Ohlin family

- Bertil Ohlin, party leader of the liberal Folkpartiet 1944–67, minister of commerce in the wartime government 1944–45.
  - Anne Wibble, representing the same party, Minister of Finance in 1991–94, daughter of Bertil Ohlin.

Reinfeldt family

- Fredrik Reinfeldt, leader of the Swedish Liberal Conservative Moderate Party since 2003, Prime Minister of Sweden 2006–2014.
- Filippa Reinfeldt, Swedish Liberal Conservative Moderate Party politician, former mayor of Täby, and since 2006 Health Service Commissioner of the Stockholm County, former wife of Fredrik Reinfeldt (1992–2012)

Wallenberg family

- Knut Wallenberg (1853–1938), banker, Swedish Minister for Foreign Affairs 1914–17
  - Raoul Wallenberg (1912–47?) businessman and diplomat, he helped many Hungarian Jews during the later stages of World War II, by issuing temporary Swedish "protective passports", grandnephew of Knut Wallenberg.

== Switzerland ==
Binder family

- Julius Binder, born 1925, member of the City Council of Baden 1961–1965, member of the National Council 1963–1975, member of the Council of States 1979–1987
  - Andreas Binder (son, husband of Marianne Binder-Keller), member of the Grand Council of Aargau 1997–2009

Keller family

- Anton Keller, 1934–2025, member of the National Council 1979–1995
  - Marianne Binder-Keller (daughter, wife of Andreas Binder), born 1958, member of the Grand Council of Aargau 2019–2019, member of the National Council since 2019

Blocher family

- Christoph Blocher, born 1940, member of the National Council 1979-2003 and 2011–2014, member of the Swiss Federal Council (2003–2007)
  - Magdalena Martullo-Blocher, (daughter), born 1969, member of the National Council since 2015

Schlumpf family

- Leon Schlumpf, 1925–2012, member of the National Council, the Council of States and of the Federal Council
  - Eveline Widmer-Schlumpf, born 1956, member of the Grand Council of Grisons 1994–1998, member of the Executive Council of Grisons 1998–2007, member of the National Council 2007–2015

Wasserfallen family

- Kurt Wasserfallen, 1947–2006, member of the Bernese City Council 1985–1990, member of the Grand Council of Bern 1990–1999, member of the National Council 1999–2006
  - Christian Wasserfallen, (son), born 1981, member of the Bernese City Council 2003–2007, member of the National Council since 2007
  - Peter Wasserfallen, (son), member of the Bernese City Council 2009–2012

== Thailand ==
Charnvirakul family

- Chavarat Charnvirakul, Deputy Prime Minister, Minister of Interior
  - Anutin Charnvirakul (son), Prime Minister (2025–), Minister of Interior

Juangroongruangkit family

- Suriya Juangroongruangkit, Deputy Prime Minister
  - Thanathorn Juangroongruangkit (nephew), Leader of Future Forward Party

Shinawatra family

- Thaksin Shinawatra, Prime Minister (2001–2006), since he was overthrown in 2006, he has lived in exile. Brother to Yingluck Shinawatra.
  - Panthongtae Shinawatra, Thai politician and businessman. Son to Thaksin Shinawatra.
  - Paetongtarn Shinawatra, Thai politician and businesswoman, Prime Minister (2024–2025). Daughter to Thaksin Shinawatra.
- Yingluck Shinawatra, former prime minister of Thailand (2011–2014). Sister to Thaksin Shinawatra
- Somchai Wongsawat, Thai politician, Prime Minister (2008). Brother-in-law to Thaksin and Yingluck Shinawatra.
  - Yodchanan Wongsawat, Deputy Prime Minister, Minister of Higher Education, Science, Research and Innovation. Son of Somchai, Thaksin’s Nephew.

Silpa-archa family

- Banharn Silpa-archa, Prime Minister (1995–1996)
  - Varawut Silpa-archa (son), Minister of Industry, Minister of Social Development and Human Security, Minister of Natural Resources and Environment

Vejjajiva family

- Long Vejjajiva, Minister for Health Affairs (1959–1969)
  - Athasit Vejjajiva, Deputy Minister for Health Affairs (1991–1992)
    - Abhisit Vejjajiva, Leader of Democrat Party (Thailand), Prime Minister of Thailand (2008–2011)
    - Suranand Vejjajiva (cousin), former exco member for Thai Rak Thai, former Member of Parliament
  - Nitsai Vejjajiva, former Thai ambassador to Malaysia

Wongsuwan family

- Prawit Wongsuwan, Deputy Prime Minister
  - Patcharawat Wongsuwan (brother), Deputy Prime Minister

== Togo ==
The Gnassingbé family

- Gnassingbé Eyadema (President of Togo, 1967–2005)
  - Fauré Gnassingbé (son of Gnassingbé Eyadema; President of Togo, 2005–)
  - Kpatcha Gnassingbé (son of Gnassingbé Eyadema; minister of defence)

The Olympio family

- Sylvanus Olympio (President of Togo, 1960–63)
  - Gilchrist Olympio (son of Sylvanus Olympio; leader, Union of Forces for Change)
  - Harry Olympio (distant cousin of Gilchrist Olympio; opposition party leader)

== Trinidad and Tobago ==
The Capildeo family

- Simbhoonath Capildeo (1914–90)
- Rudranath Capildeo (1920–70)
- Surendranath Capildeo

The Fitzpatrick family

- George F. Fitzpatrick (1875–1920)
- Hon. George Fitzpatrick II

The Sinanan family

- Ashford Sastri Sinanan (1923–1994)
- Mitra Sinanan

The Panday family

- Basdeo Panday (1933–2024)
- Subhas Panday
- Mickela Panday

The Maraj/Maharaj family

- Bhadase Sagan Maraj
- Satnarayan Maharaj

== Tunisia ==
The Bourguiba family

- Habib Bourguiba (President of Tunisia, 1957–87)
  - Habib Bourguiba, Jr. (son of Habib Bourguiba; Foreign Minister, 1964–70)

== Turkey ==
The Adak family (uncle-nephew)

- Fehim Adak (1931–2016) (Minister of Agriculture and Forestry, 1977–78)
  - Doğan Bekin (born 1957) (Member of Parliament, 2023–present)

The Ağaoğlu family

- Ahmet Ağaoğlu (1869–1939) (Member of Parliament, 1923–31)
  - Tezer Taşkıran (1907–1979) (Member of Parliament, 1943–54)
  - Samet Ağaoğlu (1909–1982) (Son of Ahmet Ağaoğlu, Deputy Prime Minister, 1950–52)
  - Neriman Ağaoğlu (1912–1984) (Wife of Samet Ağaoğlu, Member of Parliament, 1961–69)

The Ağar family (father-son)

- Mehmet Ağar (born 1951) (Minister of Justice, 1996; Minister of Interior, 1996)
  - Tolga Ağar (born 1975) (Member of Parliament, 2018–23)

The Akçal family

- İzzet Akçal (1906–1987) (Member of Parliament, 1950–60, 1977–80)
  - Erol Yılmaz Akçal (1931–2016) (Son of İzzet Akçal; Minister of Culture and Tourism, 1971–73)
  - Mesut Yılmaz (1944–2020) (Nephew of İzzet Akçal; Prime Minister, 1991, 1996, 1997–99)

The Albayrak family

- Sadık Albayrak (born 1942) (Candidate for Parliament in 1977, 1991 and 1995 general elections)
  - Berat Albayrak (born 1978) (Son of Sadık Albayrak, Son-in-law of Recep Tayyip Erdoğan; Minister of Treasury and Finance, 2018–20)
- Recep Tayyip Erdoğan (born 1954) (Prime Minister, 2003–14; President, 2014–present)

The Arıburun family

- Naci Eldeniz (1875–1948) (Member of Parliament, 1927–46)
  - Perihan Arıburun (1913–2001) (Daughter of Naci Eldeniz; Member of Parliament, 1957–60)
  - Tekin Arıburun (1903–1993) (Husband of Perihan Arıburun; Chairman of the Senate, 1970–77; Acting President, 1973)
  - Hikmet Bayur (1891–1980) (Cousin of Perihan Arıburun; Minister of National Education, 1933–34)

The Arınç family (father-son)

- Bülent Arınç (born 1948) (Speaker of the Grand National Assembly, 2002–07)
  - Ahmet Mücahit Arınç (born 1986) (Member of Parliament, 2018–present)

The Arslan family (father-son)

- İhsan Arslan (born 1948) (Member of Parliament, 2002–11)
  - Mücahit Arslan (born 1969) (Member of Parliament, 2015–23)

The Ayaydın family (father-daughter)

- Aydın Ayaydın (born 1951) (Member of Parliament, 1999–2002, 2011–15)
  - Derya Ayaydın (born 1988) (Member of Parliament, 2023–present)

The Bayar family

- Celal Bayar (1883–1986) (Prime Minister, 1937–39; President, 1950–60)
  - Ahmet İhsan Gürsoy (1913–2008) (Son-in-law of Celal Bayar; Member of Parliament, 1946–60)
  - Nilüfer Gürsoy (1921–2024) (Daughter of Celal Bayar; Member of Parliament, 1965–69, 1973–80)

The Bilgiç family

- Sait Bilgiç (1920–1988) (Brother of Sadettin Bilgiç, Member of Parliament, 1950–60)
- Sadettin Bilgiç (1920–2012) (Minister of National Defense, 1977)
  - Süreyya Sadi Bilgiç (born 1961) (Son of Sadettin Bilgiç, Deputy Speaker of the Grand National Assembly, 2019–23)

The Bilici family (father-son)

- Mehmet Ali Bilici (born 1951) (Member of Parliament, 1987–91, 1996–2002)
  - Bilal Bilici (born 1984) (Member of Parliament, 2023–present)

The Bölükbaşı family (father-son)

- Osman Bölükbaşı (1913–2002) (Member of Parliament, 1950–69)
  - Deniz Bölükbaşı (1949–2018) (Member of Parliament, 2007–11)

The Bucak family (uncle-nephew)

- Mehmet Celal Bucak (1936–1983) (Member of Parliament, 1973–80)
  - Sedat Bucak (born 1960) (Member of Parliament, 1991–2002)

The Bulut family

- Mustafa Bulut (born 1934) (Member of Parliament, 1977–80)
- Evren Bulut (1940–2010) (Brother of Mustafa Bulut; Member of Parliament, 1991–2002)
- Namık Kemal Zeybek (born 1944) (Former Father-in-law of Yiğit Bulut, Minister of Culture and Tourism, 1989–91)
  - Yiğit Bulut (1972–2025) (Son of Mustafa Bulut, Senior Advisor to the president, 2014–2025)

The Çiçek family (cousins)

- Cemil Çiçek (born 1946) (Speaker of the Grand National Assembly, 2011–15)
- Mehmet Çiçek (born 1946) (Member of Parliament, 1999–2011)

The Demirtaş family (siblings)

- Nurettin Demirtaş (born 1972) (Leader of the Democratic Society Party, 2007–08)
- Selahattin Demirtaş (born 1973) (Candidate for presidency in 2014 and 2018)

The Denizolgun family

- Kemal Kacar (1917–2000) (Member of Parliament, 1965–73, 1977–80)
  - Arif Ahmet Denizolgun (1955–2016) (Nephew of Kemal Kacar; Minister of Transport and Infrastructure, 1998–99)
  - Mehmet Beyazıt Denizolgun (born 1954) (Brother of Arif Ahmet Denizolgun; Member of Parliament, 2002–11)
    - Fatih Süleyman Denizolgun (born 1987) (Son of Mehmet Beyazıt Denizolgun; Member of Parliament, 2018–23)

The Ecevit family

- Fahri Ecevit (1896–1951) (Member of Parliament, 1943–50)
  - Bülent Ecevit (1925–2006) (Son of Fahri Ecevit; Prime Minister, 1974, 1977, 1978–79 and 1999–2002)
  - Rahşan Ecevit (1923–2020) (Wife of Bülent Ecevit; Leader of the Democratic Left Party, 1985–87)

The Emecan family (spouses)

- Adil Emecan (born 1961) (Mayor of Zeytinburnu, 1994–99)
- Emine Gülizar Emecan (born 1968) (Member of Parliament, 2018–23)

The Ensarioğlu family

- Abdurrezzak Ensarioğlu (1914–1963) (Founding member of Democrat Party)
  - Abdüllatif Ensarioğlu (1935–1984) (Son of Abdurrezzak Ensarioğlu; Member of Parliament, 1968–80)
  - Salim Ensarioğlu (born 1955) (Son of Abdurrezzak Ensarioğlu; Minister of State, 1995, 1995–96 and 1996–97; Member of Parliament, 1991–2002, 2023–present)
    - Galip Ensarioğlu (born 1966) (Grandson of Abdurrezzak Ensarioğlu; Member of Parliament, 2011–15, 2015–18, 2023–present)

The Erbakan family (father-son)

- Necmettin Erbakan (1926–2011) (Prime Minister, 1996–97)
  - Fatih Erbakan (born 1979) (Leader of the New Welfare Party, 2018–present)

The Fendoğlu family (uncle-nephew)

- Hamit Fendoğlu (1919–1978) (Member of Parliament, 1965–69; Mayor of Malatya, 1977–78)
  - Mehmet Fendoğlu (born 1961) (Member of Parliament, 2018–present)

The Feyzioğlu family (grandfather-grandson)

- Turhan Feyzioğlu (1922–1988) (Acting Prime Minister, 1980)
  - Metin Feyzioğlu (born 1969) (Ambassador of Turkey to Northern Cyprus, 2022–present)

The Fırat family

- Bedir Fırat (1872–1928) (Grandfather of Dengir Mir Mehmet Fırat; Member of Parliament, 1920–28)
  - Hüseyin Fırat (1914–1999) (Uncle of Dengir Mir Mehmet Fırat; Member of Parliament, 1950–60)
    - Mehmet Sırrı Turanlı (1921–1988) (Cousin of Dengir Mir Mehmet Fırat; Member of Parliament, 1957–60)
    - Dengir Mir Mehmet Fırat (1943–2019) (Member of Parliament, 1999–2011, 2015–18)

The Gökçek family

- Cengiz Gökçek (1934–2013) (Uncle of Melih Gökçek; Minister of Health, 1977–78)
  - Melih Gökçek (born 1948) (Mayor of Ankara, 1994–2017)
    - Osman Gökçek (born 1983) (Son of Melih Gökçek; Member of Parliament, 2023–present)

The Göksu family (siblings)

- Mahmut Göksu (born 1959) (Member of Parliament, 1999–2007)
- Mustafa Göksu (born 1966) (Ambassador of Turkey to Qatar, 2020–present)
- Tevfik Göksu (born 1966) (Mayor of Esenler, 2009–present)

The Gülek family (father-daughter)

- Kasım Gülek (1905–1996) (Secretary General of the Republican People's Party, 1950–59)
  - Tayyibe Gülek (born 1969) (Minister of State, 2002)

The Güneş family (father-son)

- Turan Güneş (1921–1982) (Deputy Prime Minister, 1977)
  - Hurşit Güneş (born 1957) (Member of Parliament, 2011–15)

The Haberal family (father-son)

- Mehmet Haberal (born 1944) (Member of Parliament, 2013–15)
  - Erkan Haberal (born 1972) (Member of Parliament, 2015–23)

The Irmak family (father-son)

- Sadi Irmak (1904–1990) (Prime Minister of Turkey, 1974–75)
  - Sabri Irmak (1936–1991) (Member of Parliament, 1983–87)

The Işık family (father-daughter)

- Mehmet Işık (1938–2022) (Member of Parliament, 2002–07)
  - Elvan Işık Gezmiş (born 1974) (Member of Parliament, 2023–present)

The İlgezdi family (spouses)

- Battal İlgezdi (born 1959) (Mayor of Ataşehir, 2009–24)
- Gamze Akkuş İlgezdi (born 1969) (Member of Parliament, 2015–present)

The İnan–Gaydalı family

- Selâhattin İnan (1887–1969) (Member of Parliament, 1950–60)
  - Abidin İnan Gaydalı (1923–1990) (Son of Selâhattin İnan; Member of Parliament, 1969–80)
  - Kâmran İnan (1929–2015) (Son of Selâhattin İnan; Minister of Energy and Natural Resources, 1977–78)
    - Mahmut Celadet Gaydalı (born 1951) (Son of Abidin İnan Gaydalı; Member of Parliament, 2015–23)
    - Edip Safder Gaydalı (born 1952) (Son of Abidin İnan Gaydalı; Minister of State, 1999–2002)

The İnönü family

- İsmet İnönü (1884–1973) (President, 1938–50; Prime Minister, 1923–24, 1925–37 and 1961–65)
  - Erdal İnönü (1926–2007) (Son of İsmet İnönü; Deputy Prime Minister, 1991–93; Acting Prime Minister, 1993)
    - Ayşe Gülsün Bilgehan (born 1957) (Granddaughter of İsmet İnönü; Member of Parliament, 2002–07, 2011–18)
    - Hayri İnönü (born 1954) (Grandson of İsmet İnönü; Mayor of Şişli, 2014–19)

The İslam–Kavakçı family

- Nadir Latif İslam (1930–2023) (Member of Parliament, 1973–77)
  - Cihangir İslam (born 1959) (Son of Nadir Latif İslam; Member of Parliament, 2018–23)
  - Merve Kavakcı (born 1968) (Former husband of Nazır Cihangir İslam; Member of Parliament, 1999)
  - Ravza Kavakçı Kan (born 1972) (Sister of Merve Kavakçı; Member of Parliament, 2015–23)
  - Ayşenur İslam (born 1958) (Daughter-in-law of Nadir Latif İslam; Minister of Family and Social Services, 2013–15)

The Kacır family (father-son)

- Ünal Kacır (born 1953) (Member of Parliament, 2002–15)
  - Mehmet Fatih Kacır (born 1984) (Minister of Industry and Technology, 2023–present)

The Karayel family (father-son)

- Yaşar Karayel (born 1950) (Member of Parliament, 2007–18)
  - İsmail Emrah Karayel (born 1978) (Member of Parliament, 2015–present)

The Kartal family

- Kinyas Kartal (1900–1991) (Member of Parliament, 1965–80)
  - Nadir Kartal (born 1946) (Son of Kinyas Kartal; Member of Parliament, 1991–95)
  - İrfan Kartal (born 1949) (Nephew of Kinyas Kartal; Member of Parliament, 2018–23)

The Kılıç family (grandfather-grandson)

- İlyas Kılıç (1921–2013) (Member of Parliament, 1961–80)
  - Akif Çağatay Kılıç (born 1976) (Minister of Youth and Sports, 2013–17)

The Kocabıyık family (former spouses)

- Hüseyin Kocabıyık (born 1963) (Member of Parliament, 2015–18)
- Funda Kocabıyık (born 1972) (Governor of Uşak, 2018–22)

The Koç–Selçuk family (father-daughter)

- Atilla Koç (born 1946) (Minister of Culture and Tourism, 2005–07)
  - Zehra Zümrüt Selçuk (born 1979) (Minister of Family and Social Services, 2018–21)

The Malkoç–Gül family (father/son-in-law)

- Şeref Malkoç (born 1960) (Member of Parliament, 1995–2002)
  - Abdülhamit Gül (born 1977) (Member of Parliament, 2015–18, 2023–present; Minister of Justice, 2017–22)

The Melen family (father-son)

- Ferit Melen (1906–1988) (Prime Minister, 1972–73)
  - Mithat Melen (1947–2020) (Member of Parliament, 2007–11)

The Menderes family (father-sons)

- Adnan Menderes (1899–1961) (Prime Minister, 1950–60)
  - Yüksel Menderes (1930–1972) (Member of Parliament, 1965–72)
  - Mutlu Menderes (1937–1978) (Member of Parliament, 1973–78)
  - Aydın Menderes (1946–2011) (Member of Parliament, 1977–80, 1996–2002)

The Öcalan family (cousins)

- Dilek Öcalan (born 1987) (Member of Parliament, 2015–18)
- Ömer Öcalan (born 1987) (Member of Parliament, 2018–present)

The Öymen family

- Hıfzırrahman Raşit Öymen (1899–1979) (Father of Altan Öymen; Member of Parliament, 1943–50)
  - Altan Öymen (1932—2025) (Leader of the Republican People's Party, 1999–2000)
  - Onur Öymen (born 1940) (Cousin of Altan Öymen; Member of Parliament, 2002–11)
    - Örsan Öymen (born 1965) (Nephew of Altan Öymen; former candidate for the Leadership of Republican People's Party)

The Özal family

- Turgut Özal (1927–1993) (Prime Minister, 1983–89; President, 1989–93)
- Semra Özal (born 1934) (Wife of Turgut Özal; Head of the Provincial Organization of Motherland Party in Istanbul, 1991–92)
- Korkut Özal (1929–2016) (Brother of Turgut Özal; Minister of Agriculture and Forestry, 1974, 1975–77; Minister of the Interior, 1977–78)
- Yusuf Bozkurt Özal (1940–2001) (Brother of Turgut Özal; Member of Parliament, 1987–96)
  - Ahmet Özal (born 1955) (Son of Turgut Özal; Member of Parliament, 1999–2002)
  - İbrahim Reyhan Özal (born 1965) (Son of Yusuf Bozkurt Özal; Member of Parliament, 2002–07)
  - Hüsnü Doğan (born 1944) (Nephew of Turgut Özal; Minister of National Defense, 1990–91)

The Özdağ family (father-son)

- Muzaffer Özdağ (1933–2002) (Member of Parliament, 1965–69)
  - Ümit Özdağ (born 1961) (Leader of the Victory Party, 2021–present)

The Öztrak family

- Faik Öztrak (1882–1951) (Minister of the Interior, 1939–42)
  - Orhan Öztrak (1914–1995) (Son of Mehmet Faik Öztrak; Minister of the Interior, 1963–65)
  - İlhan Öztrak (1925–1992) (Son of Mehmet Faik Öztrak; Minister of State, 1971–74, 1980–83)
  - Şefik İnan (1913–1972) (Son-in-law of Mehmet Faik Öztrak; Minister of Treasury and Finance, 1961–62)
    - Faik Öztrak (born 1954) (Son of Orhan Öztrak; Member of Parliament, 2007–present)
- Suut Kemal Yetkin (1903–1980) (Father-in-law of İlhan Öztrak; Member of Parliament, 1943–50)

The Özyavuz–Aktemur family (former spouses)

- İbrahim Özyavuz (born 1963) (Member of Parliament 2018–present)
- Çağla Aktemur (born 1972) (Member of Parliament 2007–11)

The Pakdemirli family (father-son)

- Ekrem Pakdemirli (1939–2015) (Deputy Prime Minister, 1991)
  - Bekir Pakdemirli (born 1973) (Minister of Agriculture and Forestry, 2018–22)

The Perinçek family (father-son)

- Sadık Perinçek (1915–2000) (Member of Parliament, 1954–57, 1961–73)
  - Doğu Perinçek (born 1942) (Leader of the Patriotic Party, 1991–present, perennial candidate)

The Ramazanoğlu–Kavaf (née Bostancı) family (siblings)

- Sema Ramazanoğlu (born 1959) (Minister of Family and Social Services, 2015–16)
- Selma Aliye Kavaf (born 1962) (Minister of State, 2009–11; Member of Parliament, 2023–present)

The Saracoğlu family (grandfather-grandson)

- Şükrü Saracoğlu (1887–1953) (Prime Minister, 1942–46)
  - Rüşdü Saracoğlu (1948–2025) (Member of Parliament, 1996–1999)

The Sazak family

- Emin Sazak (1982–1960) (Member of Parliament, 1920–50)
  - Gün Sazak (1932–1980) (Son of Emin Sazak; Minister of Customs and Monopolies, 1977–78)
    - Süleyman Servet Sazak (born 1955) (Son of Gün Sazak; Member of Parliament, 1999–2002)
    - Cem Boyner (born 1955) (Son-in-law of Gün Sazak; Leader of the New Democracy Movement, 1994–96)
    - Metin Nurullah Sazak (born 1959) (Nephew of Gün Sazak; Member of Parliament, 2018–23)

The Şahin family (father-son)

- Mehmet Ali Şahin (born 1950) (Speaker of the Grand National Assembly, 2009–11)
  - Cem Şahin (born 1977) (Member of Parliament, 2023–present)

The Sezgin family (uncle-nephew)

- İsmet Sezgin (1928–2016) (Speaker of the Grand National Assembly, 1995)
  - Aydın Adnan Sezgin (born 1956) (Member of Parliament, 2018–23)

The Sökmen family (father-son)

- Tayfur Sökmen (1892–1980) (President of the Hatay State, 1938–39, Member of Parliament, 1939–54)
  - Murat Sökmenoğlu (1945–2014) (Member of Parliament, 1983–91, 1999–2002)

The Taşkesenlioğlu family (uncle-nephews)

- Fethullah Taşkesenlioğlu (1919–1979) (Member of Parliament, 1957–60, 1969–73)
  - Ali Fuat Taşkesenlioğlu (born 1964) (Chairman of Capital Markets Board of Turkey, 2018–22)
  - Zehra Taşkesenlioğlu (born 1972) (Sister of Ali Fuat Taşkesenlioğlu, Member of Parliament, 2015–23)

The Taşdelen family

- Doğan Taşdelen (1949–2020) (Mayor of Çankaya, 1989–99)
  - Alper Taşdelen (born 1974) (Son of Doğan Taşdelen; Mayor of Çankaya, 2014–24)
  - Gürsel Erol (born 1963) (Nephew of Doğan Taşdelen; Member of Parliament, 2015–present)

The Türk family (siblings)

- Abdurrahim Türk (1937–1973) (Member of Parliament, 1969–73)
- Ahmet Türk (born 1942) (Leader of the Democratic Society Party, 2005–07)

The Türkeş family

- Alparslan Türkeş (1917–1997) (Deputy Prime Minister, 1975–77, 1977–78)
  - Tuğrul Türkeş (born 1954) (Son of Alparslan Türkeş; Member of Parliament, 2007–present; Deputy Prime Minister, 2015–17)
  - Kutalmış Türkeş (born 1978) (Son of Alparslan Türkeş, step-brother of Tuğrul Türkeş; Member of Parliament, 2011–15)
  - Ayyüce Türkeş Taş (born 1977) (Son of Alparslan Türkeş, step-brother of Tuğrul Türkeş; Member of Parliament, 2023–present)
  - Hamit Homriş (1944–2016) (Son-in-law of Alparslan Türkeş; Member of Parliament, 2007–11)

The Ürgüplü family

- Suat Hayri Ürgüplü (1903–1981) (Prime Minister of Turkey, 1965)
- Münip Hayri Ürgüplü (1905–1979) (Brother of Suat Hayri Ürgüplü; Member of Parliament, 1957–60)
  - Turhan Esener (1924–2024) (Son-in-law of Münip Hayri Ürgüplü; Minister of Labour and Social Security, 1974–75, 1980–83)

The Yıldız family (cousins)

- Feti Yıldız (born 1953) (Member of Parliament, 2018–present)
- Taner Yıldız (born 1962) (Minister of Energy and Natural Resources, 2009–15)

The Yılmaz family

- Şevki Yılmaz (born 1955) (Member of Parliament, 1995–98)
  - Mehmet Akif Yılmaz (born 1975) (Son of Şevki Yılmaz; Member of Parliament, 2015–present)
  - Ahmet Hamdi Çamlı (born 1965) (Married with the Cousin of Şevki Yılmaz; Member of Parliament, 2015–23)

The Yüksel family (father-son)

- Abdulkadir Yüksel (1962–2017) (Member of Parliament, 2015–17)
  - Müslüm Yüksel (born 1994) (Member of Parliament, 2018–23)

The Yüksel-Kılıç family (father/son-in-law)

- Ali Yüksel (born 1949) (Member of Parliament, 2023–present)
  - Suat Kılıç (born 1972) (Minister of Youth and Sports, 2011–13)

The Zeydan family (father-sons)

- Mustafa Zeydan (1938–2011) (Member of Parliament, 1991–99, 2002–07)
  - Rüstem Zeydan (born 1956) (Member of Parliament, 2007–11)
  - Abdullah Zeydan (born 1972) (Member of Parliament, 2015–18; Mayor of Van, 2024–25)

== Turkmenistan ==
The Berdimuhamedow family

- Gurbanguly Berdimuhamedow, President
  - Serdar Berdimuhamedow, President

== Tuvalu ==
The Latasi family

- Sir Kamuta Latasi (Prime Minister of Tuvalu, 1993–96)
  - Lady Naama Maheu Latasi (wife of Kamuta Latasi; Member of Parliament)

== Uganda ==
The Awori family (Kenya and Uganda)

- Aggrey Awori, formerly Member of Parliament and Minister.
- Moody Awori former Vice President of Kenya.

The Kakonge family

- Edward Kakonge, Current chairman of Uganda Peoples Congress UPC (2011–present), Minister of Local Government and Minister of Youth Culture and Sports (1986–89), Chairman of Uganda Debt Network (2007–present)
- John Kakonge (First Secretary General of Uganda Peoples Congress, formerly a Minister in Obote I Government as Minister of Cooperatives and Agriculture. He disappeared on 16 November 1972 during the Idi Amin regime. He was also a brother of Edward Kakonge.
- Festus Kambarage Kakonge (Current Commissioner for National Guidance at the Information and National Guidance ministry, formerly Resident District Commissioner in Kotido and Kabarole districts in the Museveni Government. He is a brother to both John and Edward Kakonge.
  - Mugisha Muntu (Retired) Major General (Current Forum for Democratic Change Party President – 22 November 2012 to present, formerly FDC Secretary for Mobilization, former EALA MP from 2001 to 2011, former Army Commander from 1989– 1998. Son-in-law of the late John Kakonge.

The Kiwanuka family

- Benedicto Kiwanuka, first prime minister of Uganda (1961–62), Chief Justice (1971–72), President of the Democratic Party.
  - Maurice Kagimu Kiwanuka (Diplomat, formerly a Minister and Member of Parliament), son of Benedicto Kiwanuka.

The Lutwa Okello family

- General Tito Okello, former Army Commander and President of Uganda.
  - Henry Oryem Okello (Member of Parliament and Minister), son of Tito Okello.

The Lule family

- Yusuf Lule, President (April–June 1980), Chairman of the Uganda National Liberation Front, first chairman of the National Resistance Movement.
  - Wasswa Lule (former Member of Parliament, former Deputy Inspector General of Government), son of Yusuf Lule.

The Museveni family

- Yoweri Museveni, President of Uganda, Chairman of the National Resistance Movement.
- Janet Museveni (Member of Parliament, Minister for Karamoja Affairs), wife of Yoweri Museveni.
  - Major General Muhoozi Kainerugaba (Commander of Special Forces Group of Uganda People's Defence Force), son of Yoweri and Janet Museveni.
- General Caleb Akandwanaho (Presidential Advisor, former Army Commander, Minister and Member of Parliament), brother of Yoweri Museveni.
- Sam Kutesa (Minister of Foreign Affairs, Member of Parliament), brother-in-law of Yoweri Museveni.

The Obote family

- Milton Obote (1924–2005), Prime Minister (1962–67), President (1967–71, 1981–85).
- Miria Obote (President of the Uganda People's Congress 2005–10), wife of Milton Obote.
  - Jimmy Akena (Member of Parliament), son of Milton and Miria Obote.
  - Betty Amongi Ongom (Member of Parliament and Cabinet Minister of Lands, Housing and Urban Development), wife of Jimmy Akena and daughter-in-law of Milton and Miria Obote.
- Akbar Adoko Nekyon (former Member of Parliament and Minister), cousin of Milton Obote.

== Ukraine ==
The Kuchma-Pinchuk family (father-in-law and son-in-law)

- Leonid Kuchma (b. 1938), President of Ukraine, from 1994 to 2005.
- Victor Pinchuk (b. 1960), member of the Ukrainian Parliament, Verkhovna Rada, for two consecutive terms from 1998 to 2006, son-in-law to Leonid Kuchma.

== Uruguay ==
The Arismendi family (father and daughter)

- Rodney Arismendi (leader of Communist Party of Uruguay)
  - Marina Arismendi (leader of Communist Party of Uruguay), daughter of Rodney Arismendi

The Batlle family (grandfather, son, grandsons and great-grandson)

- Lorenzo Batlle y Grau (President of Uruguay, 1868–72)
  - José Batlle y Ordóñez (President of Uruguay, 1899, 1903–07 and 1911–15), son of Lorenzo Batlle y Grau
    - César Batlle Pacheco (Deputy and Senator), son of José Batlle y Ordóñez, grandnephew of Duncan Stewart
    - Lorenzo Batlle Pacheco (Deputy and Senator), son of José Batlle y Ordóñez, grandnephew of Duncan Stewart
    - Rafael Batlle Pacheco (political journalist), son of José Batlle y Ordóñez, grandnephew of Duncan Stewart
    - Luis Batlle Berres (President of Uruguay, 1947–51), nephew of José Batlle y Ordóñez, cousin of César, Rafael, and Lorenzo Batlle Pacheco
      - Jorge Batlle Ibáñez (President of Uruguay, 2000–05), son of Luis Batlle Berres and grandnephew of José Batlle y Ordóñez
      - Carolina Ache Batlle (Deputy Minister of Foreign Relations since 2020), great-granddaughter of Luis Batlle Berres, and great-niece of Jorge Batlle Ibáñez

The Bauzá family (father and son)

- Rufino Bauzá (Uruguayan independence fighter and military figure)
  - Francisco Bauzá (Political figure and historian), son of Rufino Bauzá

The Beltrán family (father and son)

- Washington Beltrán Barbat (Blanco Party Deputy, killed by José Batlle y Ordóñez)
  - Washington Beltrán (President of Uruguay, 1965–66), son of Washington Beltrán Barbat

The Blanco family (grandfather, sons and grandson)

- Juan Carlos Blanco Fernández (Foreign Minister of Uruguay)
  - Juan Carlos Blanco Acevedo (Foreign Minister of Uruguay), son of Juan Carlos Blanco Fernández
  - Daniel Blanco Acevedo (Deputy for Montevideo), son of Juan Carlos Blanco Fernández brother of Juan Carlos Blanco Acevedo
    - Juan Carlos Blanco Estradé (Foreign Minister of Uruguay, UN Ambassador, and Senator), son of Daniel Blanco Acevedo

The Bordaberry family (grandfather, son and grandsons)

- Domingo Bordaberry (Senator, and Ruralist leader)
  - Juan María Bordaberry (President of Uruguay, 1972–76), son of Domingo Bordaberry
    - Pedro Bordaberry (former Industry and Tourism Minister), son of Juan María Bordaberry
    - Santiago Bordaberry (Rural Affairs Activist), son of Juan María Bordaberry, brother of Pedro Bordaberry

The Brum brothers

- Baltasar Brum (President of Uruguay, 1919–1923)
- Alfeo Brum (Vice President of Uruguay, 1947–1955), brother of Baltasar Brum

The Cuestas family (father and son)

- Juan Lindolfo Cuestas (President of Uruguay, 1897–99 and 1899–1903)
  - Juan Cuestas (Diplomat and political activist), son of Juan Lindolfo Cuestas

The Demicheli family (spouses)

- Alberto Demicheli (President of Uruguay, 1976)
- Sofía Álvarez Vignoli de Demicheli (Senator and diplomat), wife of Alberto Demicheli

The Ellauri family (father, son and great-grandson)

- José Longinos Ellauri Fernández (President of the Constituent Assembly of 1830; Foreign Minister of Uruguay, 1830 and 1839; Deputy, 1834–37;Attorney General of the Republic, 1839 and 1856–57, Plenipotentiary Ministry, 1839–55; Government Ministry, 1856)
  - José Eugenio Ellauri y Obes (President of Uruguay, 1873–75), son of José Longinos Ellauri Fernández
    - Oscar Secco Ellauri (Education and Culture Minister, 1948–51 and Foreign Affairs Minister, 1957–59) grandnephew of José Eugenio Ellauri y Obes and great-grandson of José Longinos Ellauri Fernández

The Fernández family (father and son)

- Hugo Fernández Artucio (former Socialist leader; subsequent Colorado trade union organizer)
  - Hugo Fernández Faingold (Vice President of Uruguay, 1998–2000), son of Hugo Fernández Artucio

The Forteza family (father and son)

- Francisco Forteza (Deputy, Senator; Defence Minister 1947–51)
  - Francisco Forteza (son) (Deputy, Senator, Economy Minister 1972), son of Francisco Forteza

The Grauert brothers

- Julio César Grauert (Deputy)
- Héctor Grauert (Senator), brother of Julio César Grauert

The Héber family (brothers and son of one of them)

- Alberto Héber Usher (President of Uruguay, 1966–67)
- Mario Héber Usher (Deputy and Senator), brother of Alberto Héber Usher
  - Luis Alberto Héber (Deputy and Senator), son of Mario Héber Usher

The Herrera family (great-grandfather, father and son)

- Luis Alberto de Herrera (In 1925–27 he presided over the National Council of Administration)
  - Luis Alberto Lacalle de Herrera (President of Uruguay, 1990–95) and grandson of political leader Luis Alberto de Herrera
    - Luis Alberto Lacalle Pou (President of Uruguay since 2020), son of Luis Alberto Lacalle

The Hierro family (grandfather, son and grandson)

- Luis Hierro (Deputy)
  - Luis Hierro Gambardella (Minister, Deputy and Senator), son of Luis Hierro
    - Luis Antonio Hierro López (Vice President of Uruguay 2000–05), son of Luis Hierro Gambardella

The Jude family (father and son)

- Raúl Jude (Deputy, Justice and Interior Minister, and Senator)
  - Raumar Jude, (Deputy and Senator), son of Raúl Jude

The Michelini family (father and sons)

- Zelmar Michelini (Senator, Minister of the Industry and he participated in the foundation of the Frente Amplio
  - Rafael Michelini (Senator and founder of Nuevo Espacio)
  - Felipe Michelini (Deputy and Subsecretary of the Ministry of Education and Culture)

The Mujica-Topolansky family (spouses)

- José Mujica (President of Uruguay 2010–2015, former senator, former Agriculture Minister)
- Lucía Topolansky (Vice President of Uruguay, 2017–2020, Senator, former Deputy), wife of José Mujica

The Nin brothers

- Rodolfo Nin Novoa (Vice President of Uruguay, 2005–)
- Gonzalo Nin Novoa (Vice Presidential administrator), brother of Rodolfo Nin Novoa

The Pacheco family

- Manuel Pacheco (Legislator of Uruguay)
  - Jorge Pacheco Areco (President of Uruguay, 1967–1972) grandson of Manuel Pacheco
    - Jorge Pacheco Klein (Colorado Party deputy), son of Jorge Pacheco Areco

The Ramírez family

- Juan Andrés Ramírez Chain (Blanco leader), had two notable grandchildren:
  - Juan Andrés Ramírez (former Interior Minister)
  - Gonzalo Aguirre Ramírez (Vice President of Uruguay, 1990–95), cousin of the former

The Saravia family (brothers and descendant of one of them)

- Gumercindo Saravia (Civil War leader in Rio Grande, Brazil)
- Aparicio Saravia (National (Blanco) Party and Uruguayan Civil War Leader, killed 1904), younger brother of Gumercindo Saravia
  - Villanueva Saravia, (National (Blanco) Party Regional Government Leader), great-great-grandson of Aparicio Saravia

The Sanguinetti family (cousins)

- Julio María Sanguinetti (President of Uruguay, 1985–90 and 1995–2000)
- Jorge Sanguinetti (former Minister of Transport and Works), cousin of Julio María Sanguinetti
- Carmen Sanguinetti (Senator since 2020), niece of Jorge Sanguinetti

The Sendic family (father and son)

- Raúl Sendic (leader of Tupamaros)
  - Raúl Fernando Sendic Rodríguez (former Industry Minister, son of Raúl Sendic

The Stewart family (descendant)

- Duncan Stewart (President of Uruguay, 1894)
  - Matilde Pacheco Stewart de Batlle y Ordóñez (First Lady of Uruguay, 1899, 1903–07, 1911–15), niece of Duncan Stewart, wife of José Batlle y Ordóñez
    - César Batlle Pacheco (Deputy and Senator), son of José Batlle y Ordóñez, grandnephew of Duncan Stewart
    - Lorenzo Batlle Pacheco (Deputy and Senator), son of José Batlle y Ordóñez, grandnephew of Duncan Stewart
    - Jorge Pacheco Areco (President of Uruguay, 1967–72), grandnephew of Duncan Stewart
      - Jorge Pacheco Klein (Colorado Party deputy), son of Jorge Pacheco Areco

The Stirling family (grandfather and grandson)

- Manuel Stirling (Deputy and Senator)
  - Guillermo Stirling (former Interior Minister), grandson of Manuel Stirling

The Terra-Baldomir family

- Gabriel Terra (President of Uruguay, 1931–38)
  - Horacio Terra Arocena (Senator), nephew of Gabriel Terra
    - Juan Pablo Terra (Deputy and Senator), son of Horacio Terra Arocena
- Alfredo Baldomir (President of Uruguay, 1938–43), brother-in-law of Gabriel Terra

The Tourné family (uncle and niece)

- Uruguay Tourné (former Deputy and Senator)
  - Daisy Tourné (former Interior Minister), niece of Uruguay Tourné

The Wílliman family (grandfather and grandson)

- Claudio Wílliman (President of Uruguay 1907–1911)
  - José Claudio Wílliman (Served in Uruguayan Senate 1985–90), grandson of Claudio Wílliman

The Végh family (father and son)

- Carlos Végh Garzón (Economy Minister 1967)
  - Alejandro Végh Villegas (Economy Minister, 1970s and 1980s), son of Carlos Végh Garzón

The Zorrilla de San Martín family (grandfather and grandson)

- Juan Zorrilla de San Martín (Poet and Deputy)
  - Alejandro Zorrilla de San Martín, (Deputy, Foreign Affairs Minister, and Senator), grandson of Juan Zorrilla de San Martín

== Uzbekistan ==
The Karimov family

- Islam Karimov (President of Uzbekistan, 1991–2016)
  - Tatyana Karimova (wife of Islam Karimov; First Lady, 1991–2016)
  - Gulnora Karimova (eldest daughter of Islam Karimov; businesswoman and politician)
  - Lola Karimova-Tillyaeva (youngest daughter of Islam Karimov; diplomat and philanthropist)

== Vanuatu ==
The Lini family

- Walter Lini (Prime Minister of Vanuatu, 1980–91)
- Ham Lini (brother; Prime Minister of Vanuatu, 2004–08)
- Hilda Lini (sister; Member of Parliament)
- Kalkot Mataskelekele (brother-in-law; President of Vanuatu, 2004–09)

The Sokomanu-Sopé family

- Ati George Sokomanu (President of Vanuatu, 1980–1989)
  - Barak Sopé (nephew of Ati George Sokomanu; Prime Minister of Vanuatu, 1999–2001)

== Venezuela ==
The Chávez family

- Hugo de los Reyes Chávez (father of Adán & Hugo Chávez; Politician)
- Adán Chávez (Governor of Barinas)
- Hugo Chávez (61st President of Venezuela)
- Marisabel Rodríguez de Chávez (ex-wife of Hugo Chávez; First Lady 1999–2002)

The Sucre family

- Antonio José de Sucre (President of Bolivia, South American Independence War Hero)
- Juan Manuel Sucre (Commander-in-Chief of Army 1974)
- Leopoldo Sucre (Public Works Minister; Senator)
- José Francisco Sucre (Ambassador; Senator)

== Vietnam ==
The Ngô Đình Diệm and Trần Văn Chương families

- Ngô Đình Diệm (Prime Minister of the State of Vietnam 1954–1955, later President of South Vietnam 1955–1963)
  - Ngô Đình Khôi (brother of Diệm, governor of Quảng Nam Province 1930–1945)
  - Ngô Đình Thục (brother of Diệm, Archbishop of Huế 1960–1968)
  - Ngô Đình Cẩn (brother of Diệm, warlord of central Vietnam 1955–1963)
  - Ngô Đình Luyện (brother of Diệm, South Vietnamese Ambassador to the United Kingdom)
  - Ngô Đình Nhu (brother of Diệm, chairman of the ruling Personalist Labor Revolutionary Party 1955–1963, and chief advisor of President Diệm 1955–1963)
  - Madame Nhu - Trần Lệ Xuân (wife of Ngô Đình Nhu, South Vietnam's First Lady 1955–1963)
    - Trần Văn Chương (father of Madame Nhu, Foreign Minister of the Empire of Vietnam 1945, and later South Vietnamese Ambassador to the United States 1954–1963)
    - Trần Văn Đỗ (uncle of Madame Nhu, Minister of Foreign Affairs of State of Vietnam 1954–55 and of South Vietnam 1965–68, and Deputy Prime Minister of South Vietnam 1965)

The Phạm Văn Cương's family

- Phạm Văn Cương (Minister of Foreign Affairs 1980–1991, and Deputy Prime Minister of Vietnam 1987–1991)
  - Phạm Bình Minh (son of Cương, Minister of Foreign Affairs of Vietnam 2011–2021, later Deputy Prime Minister of Vietnam 2013–2023)

The Trần Đức Lương's family

- Trần Đức Lương (Deputy Prime Minister 1987–1997, later President of Vietnam 1997–2006)
  - Trần Tuấn Anh (son of Lương, Minister of Industry and Trade of Vietnam 2016–2021, later Head of Central Economic Committee 2021–2024)

The Nguyễn Tấn Dũng's family

- Nguyễn Tấn Dũng (Prime Minister of Vietnam 2006–2016)
  - Nguyễn Thanh Nghị (son of Dũng, Minister of Construction 2021–2025, later Head of Central Policy, Strategy Commission of the Communist Party of Vietnam, since 2025)
  - Nguyễn Minh Triết (son of Dũng, Secretary of the Central Committee of the Ho Chi Minh Communist Youth Union, President of the Central Committee of the Vietnam Student Association)

The Nguyễn Chí Thanh's family

- Nguyễn Chí Thanh (General in the North Vietnam Vietnam People's Army, Head of Politics Department of Vietnam People's Army 1950–1961)
  - Nguyễn Chí Vịnh (son of Thanh, General of VPA, Head of General Department of Defence Intelligence, Ministry of National Defence 2009-2021)

The Trần Đại Quang's family

- Trần Đại Quang (Minister of Public Security 2011 - 2016, later President of Vietnam 2016–2018)
  - Trần Quốc Tỏ (brother of Quang, Colonel general of People's Public Security of Vietnam)
  - Trần Quân (son of Quang, Director of Vietnam State Treasury, Ministry of Finance since 2021)

The Lê Minh Hương's family

- Lê Minh Hương (Minister of Public Security 1996–2002)
  - Lê Minh Hùng (son of Hương, Lieutenant general of People's Public Security of Vietnam, Head of Police Bureau for Managing Prisons (C10), Ministry of Public Security 2018–2024)
  - Lê Minh Hà (son of Hương, Lieutenant general of People's Public Security of Vietnam, former Head of Bureau of Asia Intelligence (B02), Ministry of Public Security)
  - Lê Minh Hưng (son of Hương, Governor in the history of the State Bank of Vietnam 2016–2020, current Prime Minister of Vietnam since 2026)

The Tô Lâm's families

- Tô Lâm (current General Secretary of the Communist Party of Vietnam since 2024)
  - Tô Quyền (father of Lâm, Colonel of the People's Armed Forces, former Director of the Department of Prison Management Police (C10), former Head of Hải Hưng province Police Department)
  - Tô Long (son of Lâm, Head of Department of Foreign Security Vietnam (A01), Ministry of Public Security since 2024)

== Yemen ==
The Al-Shaabi family (brothers-in-law)

- Qahtan Muhammad al-Shaabi (President of South Yemen, 1967–69)
- Faysal al-Shaabi (Prime Minister of South Yemen, 1969)

The Iryani family (uncle-nephew)

- Abdul Rahman al-Iryani (President of North Yemen, 1967–74)
  - Abdul Karim al-Iryani (Prime Minister of Yemen, 1998–2001)

The Saleh family (father-son)

- Ali Abdullah Saleh (President of North Yemen, 1978–90 and President of Yemen, 1990–2012)
  - Ahmad Ali Abdullah Saleh (Member of Parliament)

== Zambia ==
The Chiluba Family

- Frederick Chiluba (President of Zambia, 1991–2002)
- Benjamin Mwila (cousin of Frederick Chiluba; leader of Zambia Republican Party)

The Kaunda Family

- Kenneth Kaunda (President of Zambia, 1964–91)
  - Tilyenji Kaunda (son of Kenneth Kaunda; secretary-general, United National Independence Party)

== Zimbabwe ==
The Mugabe-Chiyangwa family

- Robert Mugabe (President of Zimbabwe, 1987–2017; Prime Minister of Zimbabwe, 1980–87)
- Sabina Mugabe (sister of Robert Mugabe; Member of Parliament)
  - Innocent Mugabe (son of Sabina Mugabe; Director of the Central Intelligence Organisation)
  - Leo Mugabe (son of Sabina Mugabe; businessman and Member of Parliament)
  - Patrick Zhuwawo (son of Sabina Mugabe; businessman and Member of Parliament)
- Philip Chiyangwa (cousin of Robert Mugabe; businessman and ZANU-PF regional leader)

The Mujuru Family

- Gen. Solomon 'Rex Nhongo' Mujuru
- Joyce "Teurai Ropa" Mujuru, Vice President

== See also ==
- Hereditary politicians
- Dynasty
- List of dynasties
