= Abdus Sobhan Chowdhury =

Nawab Abdus Sobhan Chowdhury
- আবদুস সোবহান চৌধুরী
- Spouses: Tohurunessa
- Children: Altafunessa
- Relatives: Syed Nawab Ali Chowdhury (son-in-law); Altaf Ali Chowdhury (grandson); Mohammad Ali Bogra (great-grandson)

Abdus Sobhan Chowdhury was the zamindar of Bogra.

== Nawab of Bogra ==
Abdus Sobhan Chowdhury was a son of a zamindar from Tangail District's Delduar. Chowdhury married Tohurunessa, the daughter of Shobdel Ali, zamindar of Bogra. Due to the premature death of Tohurunessa's only brother, Chowdhury became the zamindar of Bogra.

On 20 March 1894, Chowdhury was conferred the title of Nawab by the British Raj for his beneficent contributions to society.

Chowdhury purchased a 3.75 acre property on the bank of Karatoya River from one Abot, a British indigo industrialist.

Chowdhury was one of the founding directors of Bogra Coronation Institution established on 1 February 1912.

== Family ==
Sobhan Chowdhury had a daughter, Altafunessa Chowdhury. She married Syed Nawab Ali Chowdhury, the zamindar of Dhanbari in Tangail, and their only son Altaf Ali Chowdhury took charge of the estate as Nawab Ali, following Sobhan's death.
