= Hamida Mohammad Ali =

Begum Hamida Mohammad Ali

Member of National Assembly of Pakistan
- In office 1962–1964

Spouse of the Prime Minister of Pakistan
- In office 17 April 1953 – 12 August 1955
- Prime Minister: Mohammad Ali Bogra
- Preceded by: Shahbano Ashraf
- Succeeded by: Mrs. Muhammad Ali

Personal details
- Spouse: Mohammad Ali Bogra
- Relatives: Altaf Ali Chowdhury (father-in-law); Syed Nawab Ali Chowdhury (grandfather-in-law); Syed Hasan Ali Chowdhury (uncle-in-law); Syeda Ashiqua Akbar (cousin-in-law)

Begum Hamida Mohammad Ali was a Pakistani socialite who was a member of the National Assembly of Pakistan and the first wife of Mohammad Ali Bogra, prime minister of Pakistan.

== Career ==
Ali was elected to the National Assembly of Pakistan in 1962 unopposed after the death of her husband, Mohammad Ali Bogra.

== Personal life ==
Ali was married to Mohammad Ali Bogra. He married Aliya Begum, Lebanese national, as second wife which offended Hamida. His second marriage was controversial in Pakistan.

=== Death ===
Begum Hamida was murdered by one of her employees under mysterious circumstances.
