= Mohammed Ali Palace Museum =

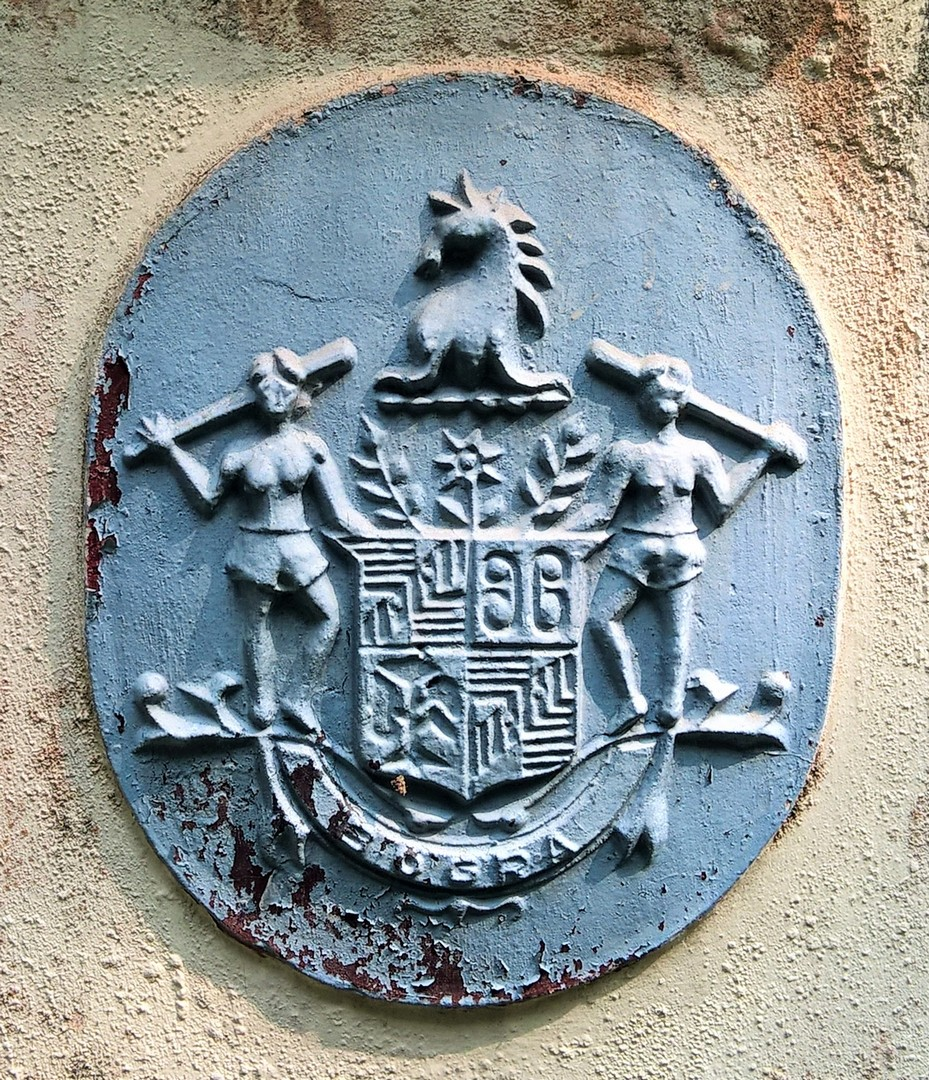
- Engraved family monogram
- Established: 31 May 1998
- Location: Nawab Bari Road, Bogra, Bangladesh
- Coordinates: 24.848492°N 89.376427°E
- Type: History museum
- Collections: Archaeology; Decorative and Contemporary Art; History and Natural History; Anthropology
- Founder: Mohammad Ali Bogra
- Owner: Bogra District administration

Mohammed Ali Palace Museum is a museum located in Bogra, Bangladesh. The museum and adjacent park has been established within the Nawab Palace on the western banks of the Karatoya River. It was officially announced as Preserved Antiquity by the Department of Archeology in May 2016.

== Establishments ==
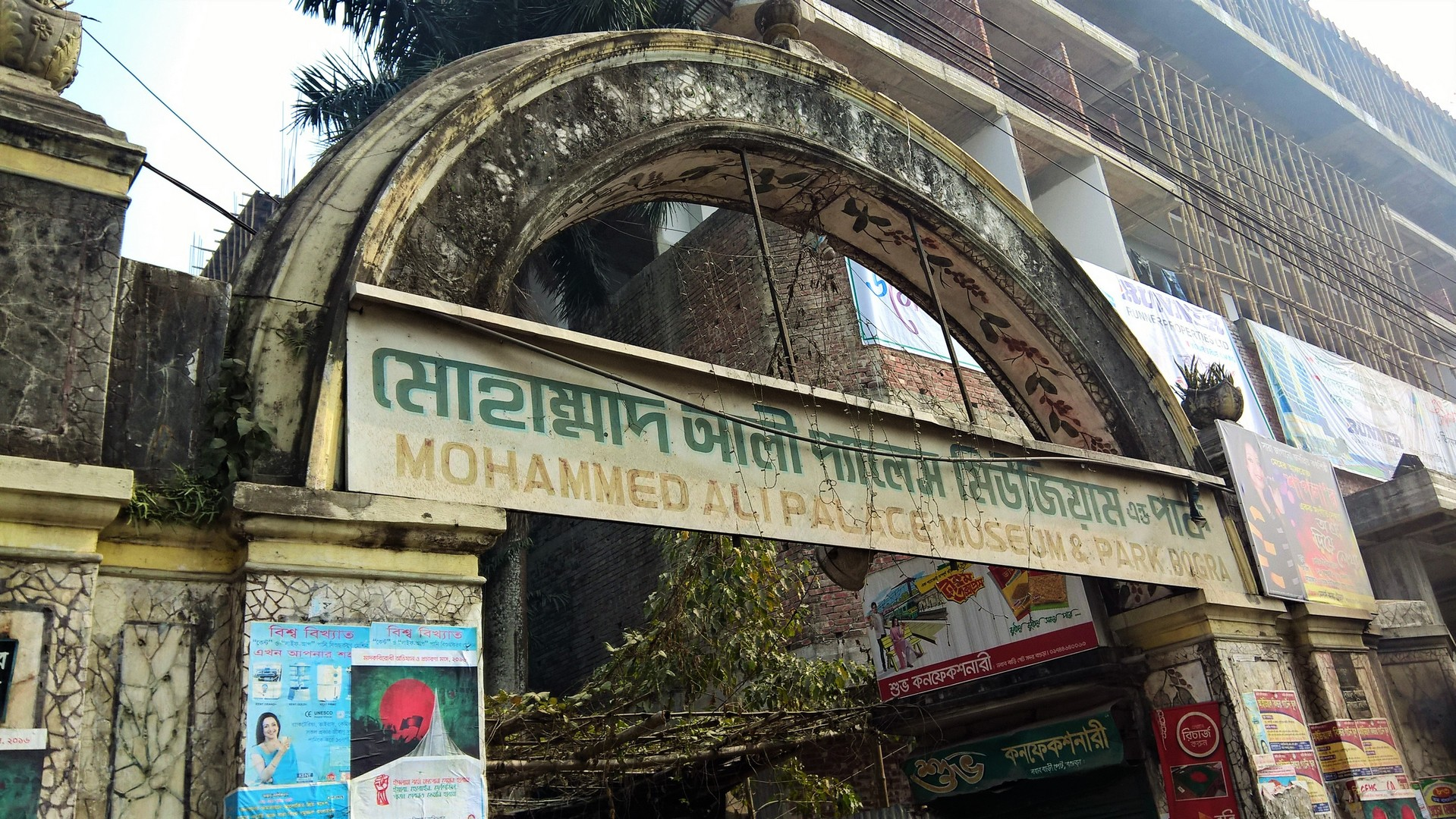
Museum entrance

There are several buildings of Nawab Palace in Bogra city. The two-storied building in which the Nawab family lived, is now known as the Nawab Palace. This building has eight rooms and nine doors in its top floor and sixteen rooms and thirteen doors in its ground floor. However, there are two one-story buildings around this building. The other building has four rooms and eleven doors. Another four buildings for the subordinate employee has nine doors. There are three gates to the palace. First gate has a clock and a searchlight, the third gate is made of wood. There are seventy-one trees in the park.

== Location ==
The Mohammed Ali Palace Museum is situated within the historic Nawab Palace of Bogra. It is located on the eastern side of the road from Satmatha Road Junction which joins Nawab Bari Road to Court Bhawan. Karatoya River is situated on the eastern bank and Court Kachari is situated on the southern side.

== History ==
The journey of Nawab Mohammed Ali Palace Museum and Amusement Park begins in May 1998. Artist Aminul Karim Dulal came forward to work on this project. With the initiative of Syed Omar Ali Chowdhury, the artist Aminul Islam Dulal preserved Nawab Palace, the textile storehouse of history, through his creativity and tried to transform it into a place to visit. Assuring the cooperation of artist Dulal, sculptures were created to bring to life many scenes like Syed Omar working, entertaining guests, playing billiards, arranging books in the reading room, Jalsa scene in the Jalsa room, collection of Naib's tribute.

== Activities ==
Open for visitors daily from 10 am to 8 pm. You have to buy a ticket of 30 takas and cross the main gate. Tickets are then required to board trains, swings, planes and enter the Nawab Museum. In the absence of Nawab Syed Altaf Ali Chowdhury, his son former Prime Minister Mohammad Ali Bogra was the sole heir. Later his three sons Syed Hammad Ali, Syed Hamde Ali and Syed Mahmud Ali and daughter Syeda Mahmuda Ali inherited the Nawab Palace from their father. At present this museum is looked after by Syed Hamde Ali Chowdhury, son of Syed Mohammad Ali.

== Gallery ==
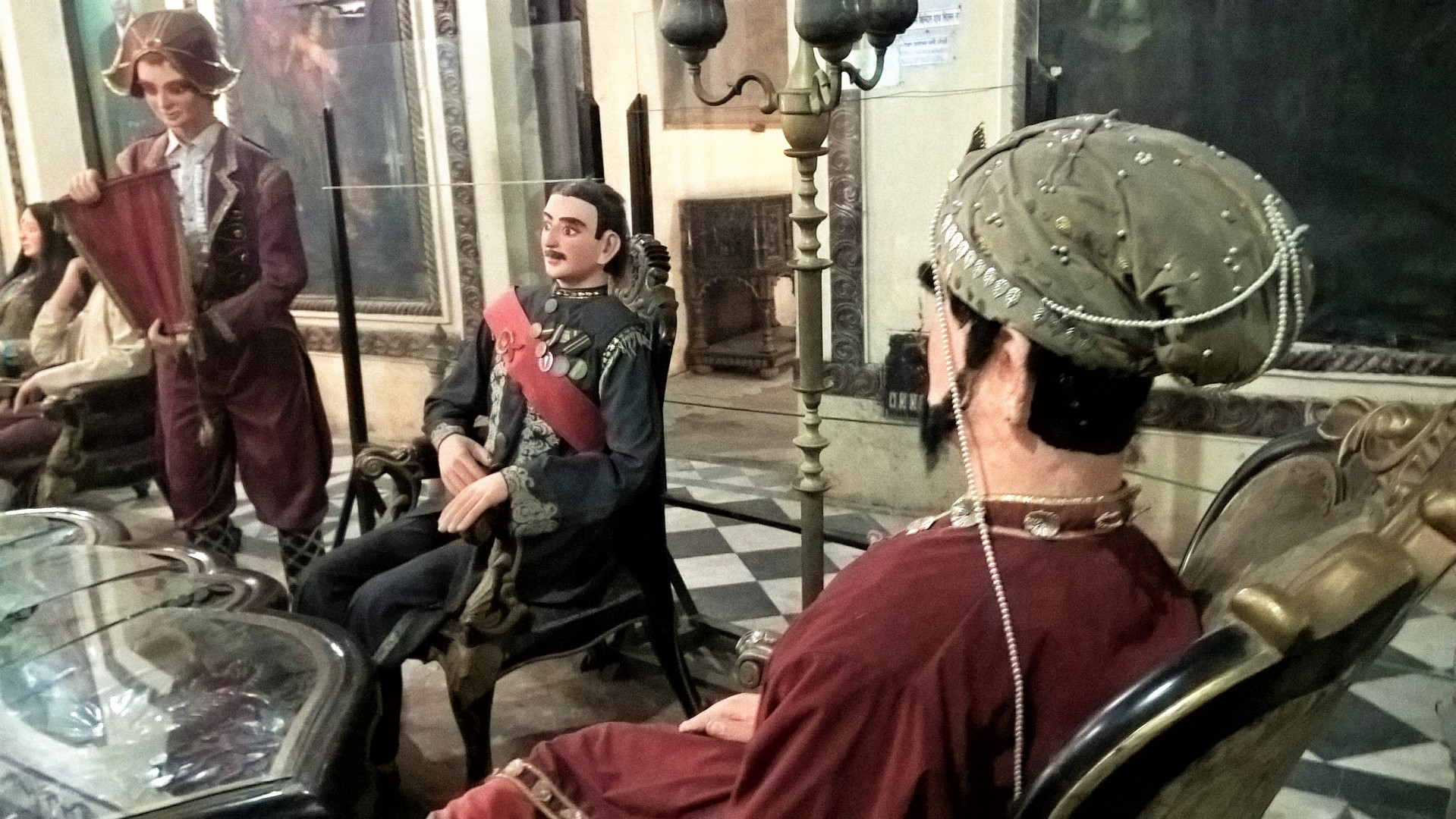

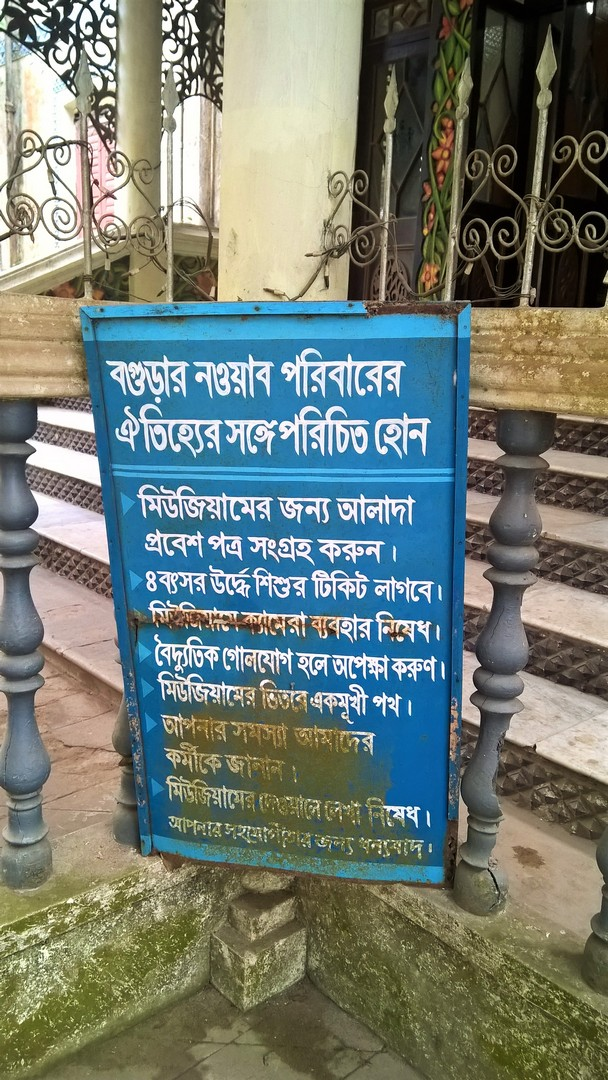

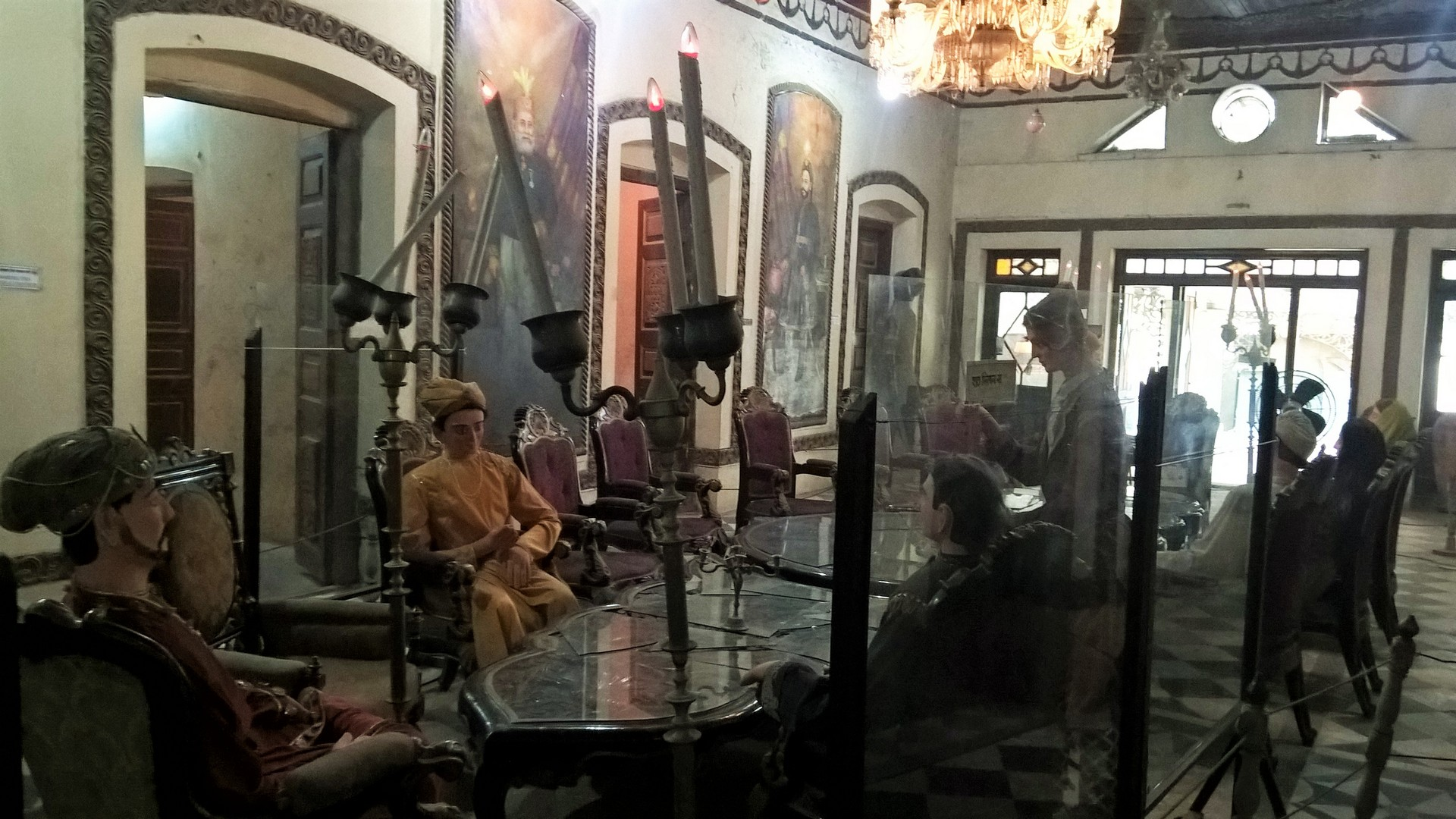

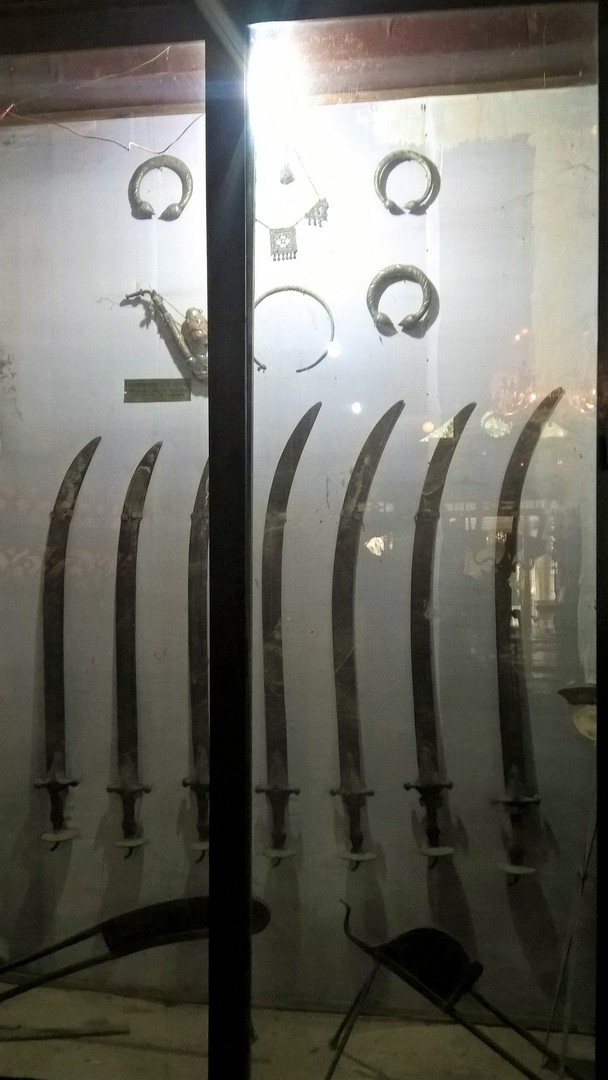

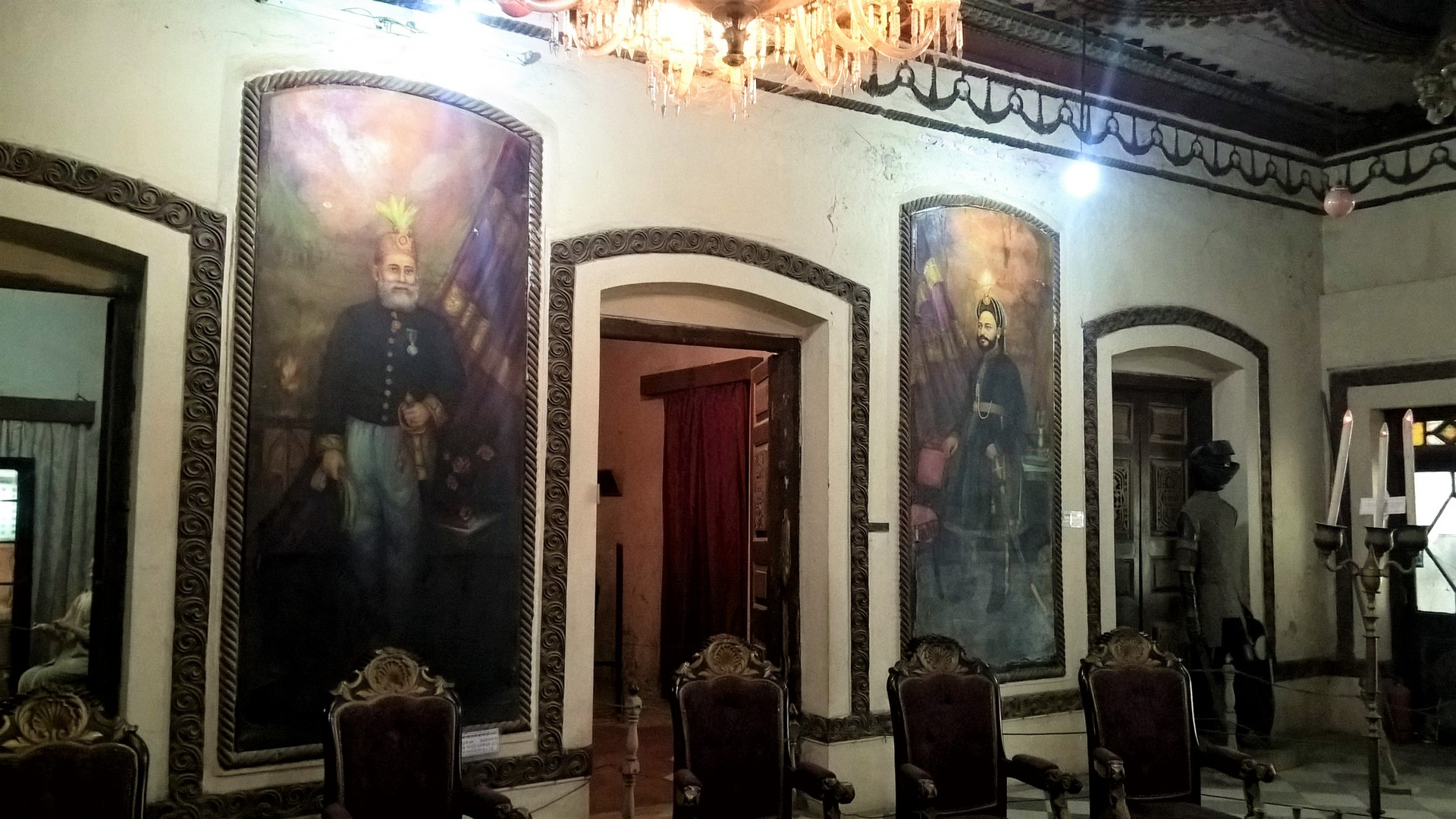

== See also ==
- Bangladesh National Museum
- Bogra District
