= Dhanbari Nawab family =

Bengali land-owning family

Nawabs of Dhanbari ধনবাড়ীর নবাব
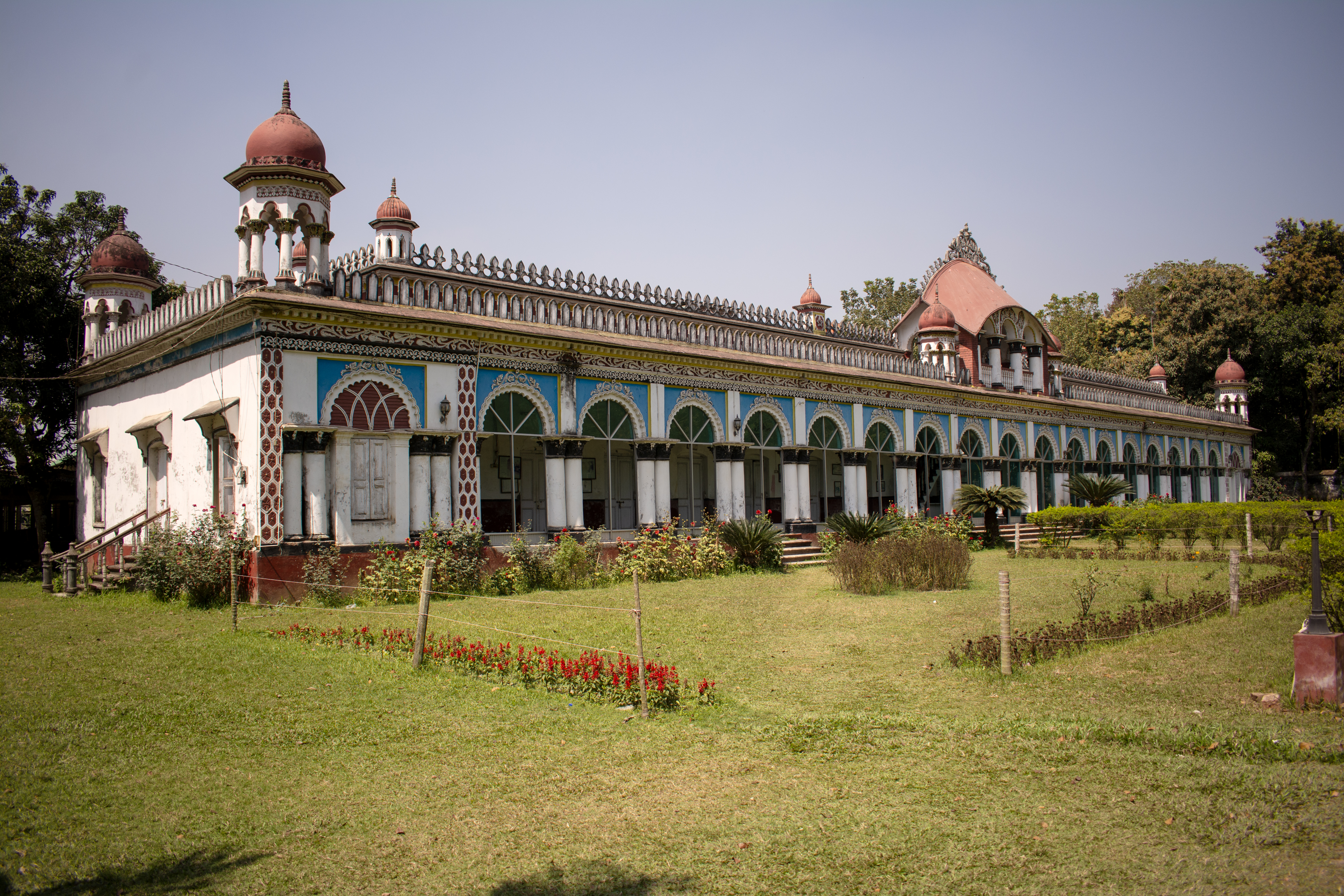
- Current region: Dhanbari, Tangail District, Dhaka Division, Bangladesh
- Earlier spellings: Chowdhuries of Dhanbari
- Origin: Baghdad, Iraq
- Founder: Shah Atiqullah
- Members: Nawab Ali Chowdhury; Altaf Ali Chowdhury; Mohammad Ali Bogra; Hasan Ali Chowdhury; Syeda Ashiqua Akbar; Afeefuddin Ahmed
- Connected families: Nawabs of Bogra; Chowdhuries of Natore; Pannis of Karatia
- Estates: Dhanbari Nawab Estate, Bogra Nawab Estate, Jangalbari Nawab Estate

The Nawabs of Dhanbari (Bengali: ধনবাড়ীর নবাব), also known as the Chowdhury family of Dhanbari (Bengali: ধনবাড়ীর চৌধুরী বংশ), were a Bengali aristocratic family of feudal landowners. The zamindari estate encompassed parts of the Tangail, Jamalpur, Mymensingh and Pabna District, particularly around Dhanbari. Although their aristocratic status was lost with the East Bengal State Acquisition and Tenancy Act of 1950, the Dhanbari estate remains an important part of the history of Tangail and tourist attraction.

== Location ==
The family is based in the town of Dhanbari, which is presently in Dhanbari Upazila of northern Bangladesh's Tangail District.

== Early history ==
The Nawabs of Dhanbari were preceded by at least two dynasties. During the reign of the Mughal emperor Akbar (r. 1542–1605), the estate of Dhanbari was subject to the Hindu zamindar Dhananjay Saudagar, also known as Dhanapati or simply Dhanapada, from whom the estate derived its nomenclature. Dhanapada has been described as an obdurate and extortionate autocrat whose predatory usurious exactions resulted in the homelessness of hundreds of Dhanbari's tenants. During this period, Bayazid Khan of nearby Santosh, a member of the Baro-Bhuiyan confederacy was killed by the forces of Akbar's general Man Singh I whilst defending his territory. His son and successor, Sayyid Khan, requested the Mughal sovereign to confront Dhanapada, leading to a force of two hundred soldiers of the Mughal Army being dispatched to Dhanbari. This army was led by two brothers, Munawwar Khan and Isfandiyar Khan. Not wanting to go into battle, Dhanapada fled to Sarail for safety. The two brothers thus bloodlessly gained power over Dhanbari, and subsequently expressed their wishes of settling there to Akbar. The emperor permitted them to do so, and so they became the next Zamindar dynasty of Dhanbari after settling there permanently. The two brothers also established a weaving business in Dhanbari. Munawwar Khan's descendant, Akbar Ali Khan Chowdhury, attained official recognition as the Zamindar of Dhanbari by the British East India Company in 1793. His son and successor, Raza Ali Khan Chowdhury, married Sayyidah Talibunnesa Khatun Chowdhurani, daughter of Shah Khoda Bakhsh. Chowdhury died without any heirs, and so his wife inherited the zamindari of Dhanbari and initiated the start of this later dynasty.

== Later history ==
The early history of this later Nawab dynasty of Dhanbari was documented in a waqfnama (deed of endowment) written by Nawab Ali Chowdhury. This family claim descent from Shah Atiqullah, a Muslim preacher from Baghdad, who had migrated to Delhi in the Mughal period. The document claims that Atiqullah was descended from both Abdul Qadir Gilani (a direct descendant of Ali, the fourth Caliph of Islam) as well as the Persian scholar Abu Hanifa. It is argued by the British-Bangladeshi historian Muhammad Mojlum Khan that "there is no conclusive evidence" of the family's descent from Shah Atiqullah. Nevertheless, from among Atiqullah's descendants was Shah Sultan who was awarded jagirs from the Mughal emperor, settling down in the village of Nakalia in Pabna. As a result of the Jamuna river erosion, Sultan's offspring moved to the village of Hasmelan in Harirampur, Manikganj.

Shah Khoda Bakhsh of this family married a woman belonging to the Syed family of Muqimpur village in Baniara, Tangail. The Shah family of Hasmelan were not accustomed to exogamous marriage and as a result, Bakhsh was expelled from his village and lived with his wife in Baniara. He had a son and a daughter. His daughter, Sayyidah Talibunnesa Khatun, was married to Raza Ali Khan Chowdhury, the Zamindar of Dhanbari. Chowdhury died leaving no heirs, and so the zamindari was inherited by Khatun. After Khatun's death, her husband inherited the zamindari and migrated from Baniara to Dhanbari, where he was granted the title of Nawab.

Bakhsh was a pir who was said to have been unattached to wealth and property. The waqfnama claims that because of this spiritual nature, the family did not bother to preserve the sanads (land grants) received from the emperor. As hereditary pirs, the maintenance and preservation of the zamindari was entrusted to their murids (disciples). The extent of the zamindari was very large when Bakhsh became its zamindar. However, as a result of his lack of knowledge in worldly affairs, a lot of land was lost during his tenure.

After Bakhsh's death, his son and successor Syed Muhammad Shah became the Gaddi nasheen of Dhanbari Estate. His zamindari was spread out across Tangail, Jamalpur, Sherpur, Pabna and Mymensingh. He married Karimunnesa Bibi, the eldest daughter of Ghulam Yahya Siddiqi of Rajkhara in Harirampur, Manikganj. Like his father, Muhammad Shah was described as a high-level ascetic who was not fond of worldly activities. He was a senior student of Shah Laqitullah Fazl-e-Haq (1790–1836), the pir of Azimpur Dayera Sharif. Syed Muhammad Shah was attached to his teacher to such an extent that he gifted the Dhanbari zamindari to him. However, his teacher did not accept this, and requested that he take it back. However, Muhammad Shah was not willing to take it back, and so Lakitullah gifted the zamindari to Muhammad Shah's wife, Karimunnesa Bibi.

Karimunnesa managed the zamindari for some time and was succeeded by her son, Shah Syed Janab Ali Chowdhury. Chowdhury married Rabeya Khatun, the daughter of Khan Bahadur Muhammad Ali Khan Chowdhury of Natore. His mother Karimunnesa gifted a quarter of the zamindari to Rabeya Khatun. He died aged 28 years, leaving a son named Nawab Ali Chowdhury and a daughter named Sayera Khatun Chowdhurani. His children spent their childhood being raised by their grandmother, Karimunnesa. Sayera Khatun married in Natore, where Karimunnesa died. The two siblings inherited the quarter of the estate from their mother, and the remaining three quarters from their grandmothers, thus making the entire zamindari go to them. Their maternal uncle Khan Bahadur Moulvi Muhammad Rashid Khan Chowdhury was appointed their guardian as they were minors, and from then they were raised in Natore. Later, he married off his own son Nur Muhammad Khan Chowdhury with Sayera Khatun.

Syed Nawab Ali Chowdhury became the next zamindar. He married Altafunnesa Chowdhurani, daughter of Nawab Abdus Sobhan Chowdhury, the Zamindar of Bogra. After the death of Altafunnesa, Nawab Ali married Syedani Shahida Akter Khatun, a descendant of Baro-Bhuiyan chief Isa Khan and daughter of Diwan Azimdad Khan, Zamindar of Jangalbari of Kishoreganj. Thirdly, he married Syedani Sakina Khatun Chowdhurani, second daughter of Nawab Abdus Sobhan Chowdhury, Nawab of Bogra. He is celebrated as the first Muslim Minister of Bengal, Privy Council Member of the Viceroy of India, co-founder of All India Muslim League, proprietor of the first Bengali newspaper - Mihir O Sudhakar and the founder of University of Dhaka.Syed Nawab Ali Chowdhury had two sons and two daughters:

- Syed Mohammad Faizul Bari Altaf Ali Chowdhury: He was the Nawab of Bogra. He had four sons and two daughters, including
  - Syed Muhammad Ali Chowdhury Bogra: Prime Minister of Pakistan
- Syed Hasan Ali Chowdhury : Syed Abul Kasem Mohammad Hasan Ali Chowdhury was the last Nawab and Zamindar of Tangail, Jamalpur, Sherpur and parts of Mymensingh, Kishoreganj and Natore districts. He was a seasoned politician, member of several parliaments (starting from British India, Pakistan and culminating with Bangladesh) and co-founder of Krishak Praja Party and Bangladesh Nationalist Party (BNP). He founded the newspaper Ittehad which later became Ittefaq. He married Syedani Razya Khatun of Natore, daughter of Ashraf Ali Khan Chowdhury. After the death of his first wife, he remarried her sister - Syedani Lamya Asya.
  - Syeda Ashiqua Akbar also known as Sahibzadi Syeda Umme Rushaida Ashiqua Hasan Ali Chowdhrani is the only child of Nawabzada Syed Hasan Ali and Syedani Lamya Asya Ashraf Ali. Syeda Ashiqua Akbar is the first directly elected women parliamentarian of Bangladesh Jatiyo Sangshad. She succeeded Nawabzada Syed Hasan Ali as the third Mutawalli of the Nawab Estate of Dhanbari in Tangail and of Jangalbari in Kishoreganj until her death on April 25, 2022. She was married to Dr. Akbaruddin Ahmad (banker and educationist) and the son of A. M. Jalaluddin Ahmad the former Deputy Governor of the State Bank of Pakistan. They had five children.

== Nawabs ==
Name	Birth	Children	Death	Claim
Nawāb Shāh Sayyid Khudā Bakhsh نواب شاه سيد خدا بخش নবাব শাহ সৈয়দ খোদা বখশ	?	Sayyid Muhammad Shah	?	Inherited from his wife
Nawāb Sayyid Muḥammad Shāh نواب سيد محمد شاه নবাব সৈয়দ মহম্মদ শাহ	?	Janab Ali Chowdhury	?	First son
Nawāb Sayyid Janāb ʿAlī Chowdhurī نواب سيد جناب علي چودھری নবাব সৈয়দ জনাব আলী চৌধুরী	?	Nawab Ali Chowdhury	?	First son
Nawāb Sayyid Nawāb ʿAlī Chowdhurī نواب سيد نواب علي چودھری নবাব সৈয়দ নওয়াব আলী চৌধুরী	29 December 1863	5	17 April 1929	First son
Nawāb Sayyid Muḥammad Fayḍ al-Bāriʾ Alṭāf ʿAlī Chowdhurī نواب سيد محمد فيض البارئ الطاف علي چودھری নবাব সৈয়দ মহম্মদ ফয়জুল বারী আলতাফ আলী চৌধুরী	?	6	?	First son
Nawāb Sayyid Abū al-Qāsim Muḥammad Ḥasan ʿAlī Chowdhurī نواب سيد ابو القاسم محمد حسن علي چودھری নবাব সৈয়দ আবুল কাসেম মহম্মদ হাসন আলী চৌধুরী	c. 1910	1	30 May 1981	Brother
East Bengal State Acquisition and Tenancy Act of 1950
Sayyidah Umm Rushaydah ʿĀshiqah Chowdhurānī سيدة ام رشيدة عاشقة چودھرانی সৈয়দা উম্মে রুশায়দা আশিকা চৌধুরানী	?	5	25 April 2022	Only child
al-Mutawallī ʿAfīf ad-Dīn bin Akbar ad-Dīn bin Jalāl ad-Dīn Aḥmad المتولي عفيف الدين بن اكبر الدين بن جلال الدين احمد মোতাওয়াল্লী আফীফ উদ্দীন বিন আকবর উদ্দীন বিন জলাল উদ্দীন আহমদ	?	?		Son

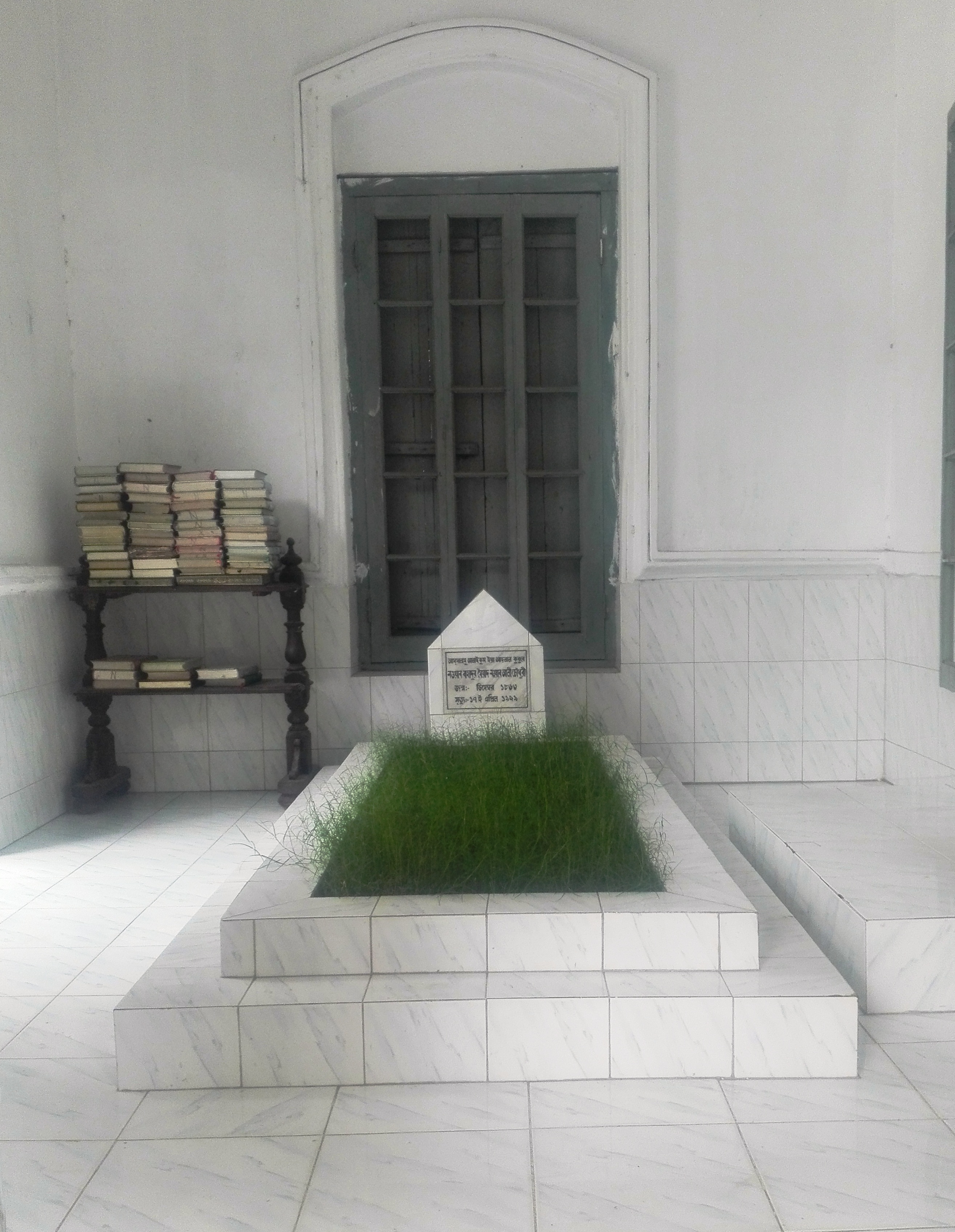
Tomb of Nawab Ali Chowdhury

== See also ==
- Mohammad Ali Bogra
- Syed Nawab Ali Chowdhury
