= Syeda Ashiqua Akbar =

Bangladeshi politician (c. 1944 – 2022)

- সৈয়দা আশিকা আকবর

Member of the Bangladesh Parliament for Tangail-1
- In office 1981 – 24 March 1982
- Preceded by: Syed Hasan Ali Chowdhury
- Succeeded by: Nizamul Islam

Personal details
- Born: Syeda Umme Rushaida Ashiqua Chowdhurani c. 1944 Bengal Presidency
- Died: 25 April 2022 (aged 78) Dhaka, Bangladesh
- Party: Bangladesh Nationalist Party
- Children: 5
- Parent: Syed Hasan Ali Chowdhury (father)
- Relatives: Syed Nawab Ali Chowdhury (grandfather); Ashraf Ali Khan Chowdhury (grandfather); Altaf Ali Chowdhury (uncle); Mohammad Ali Bogra (cousin); Hamida Begum (cousin-in-law)

Syeda Umme Rushaida Ashiqua Akbar (Bengali: সৈয়দা উম্মে রুশাইদা আশিকা আকবর; née Chowdhurani, c. 1944 – 25 April 2022) was a Bangladeshi politician and a Jatiya Sangsad member representing the Tangail-1 constituency during 1981–1982.

== Early life ==
Syeda Umme Rushaida Ashiqua Chowdhurani was born c. 1944 to a Bengali zamindar family known as the Nawabs of Dhanbari. Her father Syed Hasan Ali Chowdhury was a former minister in the East Bengal Legislative Assembly, whilst her grandfather Syed Nawab Ali Chowdhury was one of the founders of Dacca University and the first Muslim minister of British Bengal. Her mother, Syedani Lamya Asya, was the daughter of Zamindar Ashraf Ali Khan Chowdhury of Natore.

== Career ==
Akbar was elected to parliament in 1981 in a by-election from Tangail-1 as a candidate of Bangladesh Nationalist Party.

== Personal life ==
She married the banker and educationist Dr. Akbaruddin Ahmad. Her father-in-law is A. M. Jalaluddin Ahmad, a former deputy governor of the State Bank of Pakistan. Her children are Almas Akbar, Abraruddin Ahmad, Asfia Akbar, Atqia Akbar and Afeefuddin Ahmad.

== Death ==
Akbar died on 25 April 2022.
