= Chowdhuries of Natore =

Political family in Bengal

Chowdhuries of Natore নাটোরের চৌধুরী বংশ
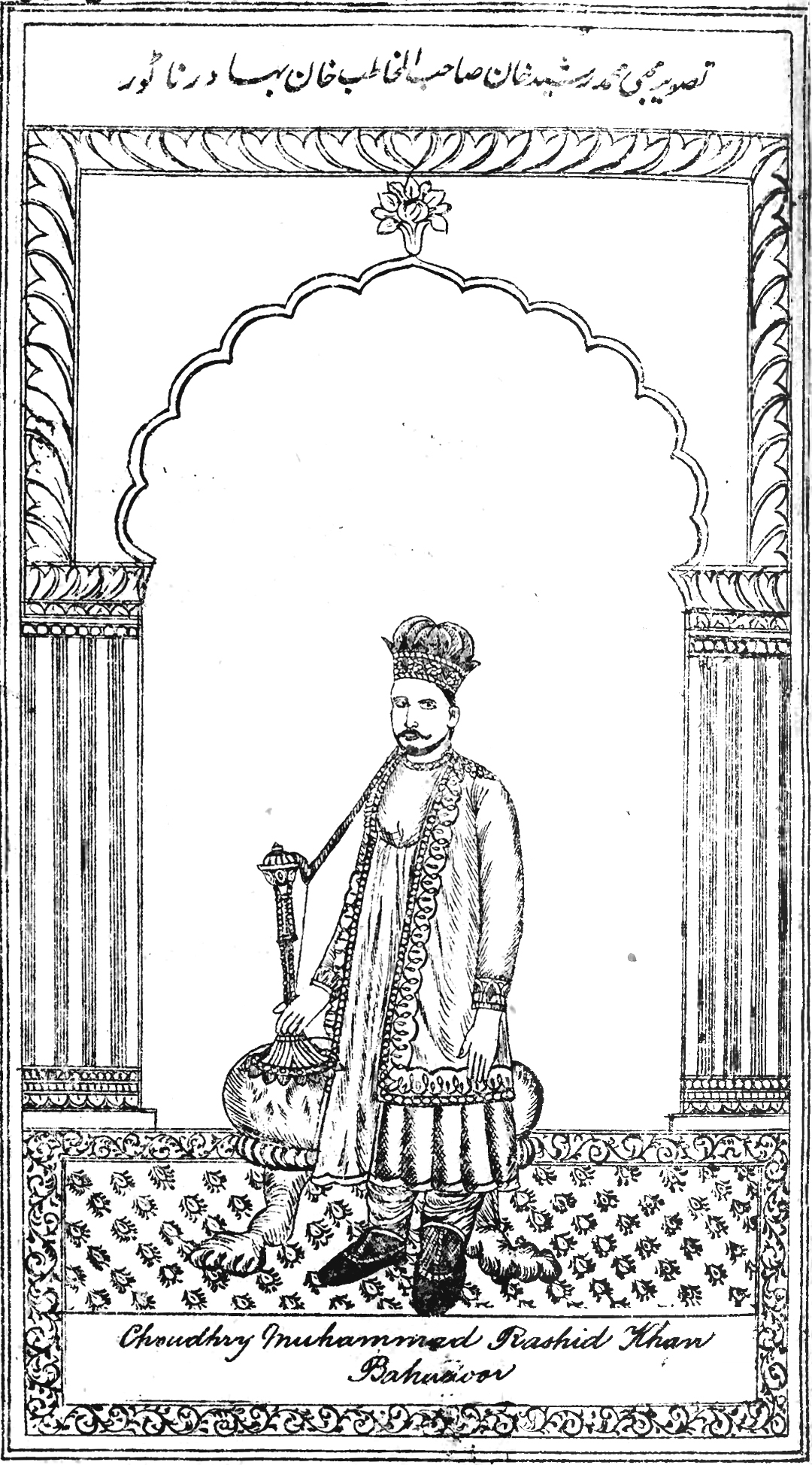
- Illustration of Rashid Ali Khan Chowdhury from Mauj-i-Sultani (1884).
- Current region: Natore, Bengal Presidency (now Bangladesh)
- Origin: Afghanistan
- Members: Ashraf Ali Khan Chowdhury; Abdus Sattar Khan Chowdhury; Amjad Khan Chowdhury
- Connected families: Nawabs of Dhanbari

The Chowdhuries of Natore (Bengali: নাটোরের চৌধুরী বংশ) are a noble Bengali family who have played important roles throughout the history of North Bengal.

== History ==
The family is descended from Amanullah Khan, a Yusufzai Afghan Pathan nobleman who settled in Burdwan, Bengal Subah in the early 18th century with his son, Azam Khan. His son, Muhammad Zaman Khan served as a nazir for the Controlling Council of Revenue at Murshidabad as early as 1772. The family moved to Natore in northern Bengal when Zaman Khan was appointed as the nazir of the Natore faujdari court and given large tracts of land in that district. In 1787, under the governorship of Lord Cornwallis, the Company Raj conferred the title of Chowdhury to him, in addition to the family's original title of Khan.

After his death, his son Dost Muhammad Khan extended the zamindari across along the wetlands of Chalan Beel. An admirer of the Sufi saint Bagu Dewan Shah, he constructed a three-domed mosque at the Vellabariya Dargah complex following Shah's death in 1820. As zamindar, he fiercely defended his estate's land rights against both local tenants and British commercial interests, including a high-profile legal victory against the indigo firm Robert Watson & Co. in 1856. He was also a patron of education, contributing 100 rupees monthly to the Chatmohar Anglo-Vernacular school among others. His eldest son, Chowdhury Muhammad Ali Khan, was a religious scholar fluent in Persian and Arabic.

Khan Bahadur Chowdhury Muhammad Ali Khan had two sons; Rashid and Ershad. His daughter Rabeya Khatun married into the Dhanbari Nawab family and was gifted a quarter of the Dhanbari zamindari. Rashid Ali Khan Chowdhury inherited said zamindari from his father and most notably founded the Rashid Anglo-Persian School in 1862. Ershad Ali Khan Chowdhury was a notable politician and member of the Bengal Legislative Council. After the establishment of the All-India Muslim League in 1906, he was appointed as the inaugural chairman of its Natore branch. He was also a member of the Bengal Management Conference and a supporter of the Mohammedan Literary Society.

Following the death of Ershad Ali Khan Chowdhury in 1928, his son Ashraf Ali Khan Chowdhury succeeded him as patriarch of the zamindari estate. Through matrilineal inheritance, Khan Chowdhury inherited the Shahzadpur zamindari. A Muslim League politician like his father, Khan Chowdhury also served as the deputy speaker of the Bengal Legislative Assembly.

Although the East Bengal State Acquisition and Tenancy Act of 1950 led to the abolishment of the zamindari system, members of the family continued to hold political power in Bangladesh, including Abdus Sattar Khan Chowdhury, a former BNP parliamentarian.

== See also ==
- History of Rajshahi
- List of political families of Bangladesh
