= Altaf Ali Chowdhury =

Bangladeshi politician

Nawab Altaf Ali Chowdhury
- আলতাফ আলী চৌধুরী

Member of the Bengal Legislative Council
- In office 1924–1926
- Constituency: Mymensingh East

Personal details
- Born: 12 October 1888 Bogra, Bengal, British India
- Died: 10 July 1944 (aged 55)
- Party: Swaraj Party
- Children: Mohammad Ali Bogra
- Parent: Nawab Ali Chowdhury (father)
- Relatives: Hasan Ali Chowdhury (brother); Syeda Ashiqua Akbar (niece); Hamida Begum (daughter-in-law)
- Occupation: Politician

Syed Mohammad Faizul Bari Altaf Ali Chowdhury (Bengali: সৈয়দ মহম্মদ ফয়জুল বারী আলতাফ আলী চৌধুরী; 1888–1944) was a Bengali politician, minister and zamindar belonging to the Nawab families of both Dhanbari and Bogra.

== Early life ==
Chowdhury was born in 1888 at his maternal home in Matidali Nawab Bari, Bogra District, Bengal Presidency. He belonged to a Bengali zamindar family known as the Nawabs of Dhanbari in Tangail District. His father, Nawab Syed Nawab Ali Chowdhury, was the first Muslim minister in the Bengal government. His mother, Syeda Altafunnesa Chowdhurani, was the only child of Abdus Sobhan Chowdhury, the Nawab of Bogra. She died during his childhood and so he was taken to Calcutta with his father where he joined the Calcutta Alia Madrasa. Chowdhury graduated from the University of Calcutta.

== Career ==
Chowdhury began his career as an assistant settlement officer for three years. After that, he was appointed by the Governor of Eastern Bengal and Assam to be the deputy magistrate of Noakhali District and later on in the Backergunge District. After retiring, he returned to Bogra where he inherited the waqf estate and zamindari of his maternal grandfather, Nawab Abdus Sobhan Chowdhury of Bogra. He served as the chairman of Bogra municipality between 1914 and 1923. Chowdhury eventually joined the Swaraj Party founded and led by Chittaranjan Das. In 1924, he was elected to the Bengal Legislative Council as a Swaraj Party candidate in the Mymensingh East constituency. He served in the council until 1926. Chowdhury was also the chairman of the Bogra District Board from 1926 to 1932, and 1942 to 1943.

Chowdhury established the Altafnagar Rail Station in Dhupchanchia, Bogra. He was one of the funders and founders of the Edward Park in Bogra city, and contributed financially to the development of the Woodburn Library in Bogra. Chowdhury was also a footballer for the Bogra district football team and Bogra's town club was founded through his initiative.

== Personal life ==
Chowdhury had six sons and one daughter. His children from his first wife were Mohammad Ali Chowdhury, Ahmad Ali Chowdhury, Hamid Ali Chowdhury, Mahmud Ali Chowdhury and Mahmud Chowdhurani. His children from his second wife were Amir Ali Chowdhury and Omar Ali Chowdhury.

== Death and legacy ==
He died in 1944.
