= Syed Hasan Ali Chowdhury =

Bangladeshi politician

Nawab Syed Hasan Ali Chowdhury

Member of the Bangladesh Parliament for Tangail-1
- In office 18 February 1979 – 30 September 1981
- Preceded by: Abdus Sattar
- Succeeded by: Syeda Ashiqua Akbar

Minister for Commerce and Industry, East Pakistan
- In office 1962–1963
- Preceded by: Muhammad Mansur Ali
- Succeeded by: Dewan Abdur Rab Choudhury

Member of the Bengal Legislative Assembly
- In office 1937–1939
- Succeeded by: Ibrahim Khan
- Constituency: Tangail North (Madhupur-Gopalpur)

Personal details
- Born: 17 September 1910 Tangail, Eastern Bengal and Assam, British India
- Died: 30 September 1981 (aged 71) Dhaka, Bangladesh
- Party: Krishak Sramik Party
- Other political affiliations: Bangladesh Nationalist Party
- Children: Syeda Ashiqua Akbar
- Parent: Syed Nawab Ali Chowdhury (father)
- Relatives: Mohammad Ali Bogra (nephew); Ashraf Ali Khan Chowdhury (father-in-law)
- Occupation: Politician

Syed Hasan Ali Chowdhury (Bengali: সৈয়দ হাসান আলী চৌধুরী; c. 1910 – 30 September 1981) was a Bangladeshi politician, minister and the former Nawab of Dhanbari. He served as a minister for commerce and industry in East Pakistan after being elected in the 1962 elections.

== Early life ==
Chowdhury was born in c. 1910 to a Bengali zamindar family known as the Nawabs of Dhanbari. His father, Syed Nawab Ali Chowdhury, was one of the founders of Dhaka University and the first Muslim minister of United Bengal.

== Career ==
Chowdhury entered politics by joining A. K. Fazlul Huq's Krishak Sramik Party. He contested for the party in the 1937 Bengal legislative elections, winning in the Tangail North (Madhupur-Gopalpur) constituency.

In 1962, he was made minister for commerce and industry of East Pakistan. After the Bangladesh Liberation War, he contested as a Bangladesh National Party candidate from the Tangail-1 (Madhupur-Dhanbari) constituency in the second Bangladeshi parliamentary election, held on 18 February 1979.

== Personal life ==
Chowdhury married Syedani Razya Khatun, a daughter of Zamindar Ashraf Ali Khan Chowdhury of Natore. After her death, he married her sister, Syedani Lamya Asya.

== Death and legacy ==
He died on 30 September 1981. After his death, his only child, a daughter named Syeda Ashiqua Akbar, was elected as a member of parliament following a by-election.
