= Mohammad Ali Bogra =

Prime Minister of Pakistan from 1953 to 1955

Sahibzada Mohammad Ali Bogra
- মোহাম্মদ আলী বগুড়া محمد علی بوگڑا
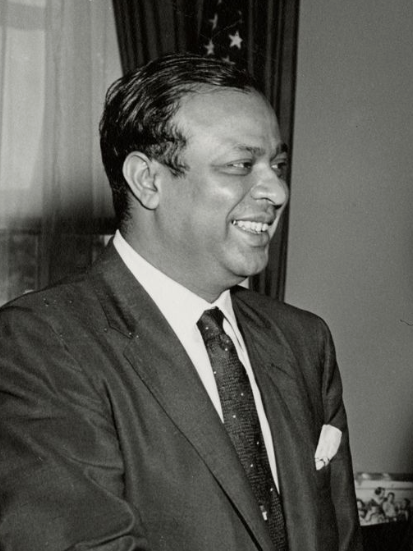
- Bogra in 1954

3rd Prime Minister of Pakistan
- In office 17 April 1953 – 12 August 1955
- Monarch: Elizabeth II
- Governors General: Malik Ghulam Muhammad; Iskander Ali Mirza
- Preceded by: Khwaja Nazimuddin
- Succeeded by: Muhammad Ali

3rd & 7th Minister of Foreign Affairs
- In office 13 June 1962 – 23 January 1963
- President: Muhammad Ayub Khan
- Deputy: S.K. Dehlavi (Foreign Secretary)
- Preceded by: Manzur Qadir
- Succeeded by: Zulfikar Ali Bhutto
- In office 24 October 1954 – 12 August 1955
- Governors General: Malik Ghulam Muhammad; Iskander Ali Mirza
- Deputy: J.A. Rahim (Foreign Secretary)
- Preceded by: M. Zafarullah Khan
- Succeeded by: Hamidul Huq Choudhury

4th Minister of Defence
- In office 17 April 1953 – 24 October 1954
- Deputy: Akhter Husain (Defence Secretary)
- Preceded by: Khwaja Nazimuddin
- Succeeded by: General Ayub Khan

Pakistan Ambassador to Japan
- In office 1959–1962
- President: Ayub Khan
- Preceded by: Omar Hayat Malik
- Succeeded by: K. M. Sheikh

Pakistan Ambassador to the United States
- In office November 1955 – March 1959
- President: Iskander Mirza
- Preceded by: Syed Amjad Ali
- Succeeded by: Aziz Ahmed
- In office 27 February 1952 – 16 April 1953
- Governor General: Malik Ghulam
- Preceded by: A. H. Isphani
- Succeeded by: Amjad Ali

High Commissioner of Pakistan to Canada
- In office 1949–1952
- Governor General: Khawaja Nazimuddin

Pakistani Ambassador to Burma
- In office 1948–1949
- Governors General: Muhammad Ali Jinnah (1948); Khawaja Nazimuddin (1948–1949)
- Preceded by: Shamsuddin Ahmed

President of Pakistan Muslim League
- In office 17 April 1953 – 12 August 1955
- Preceded by: Khawaja Nazimuddin
- Succeeded by: Muhammad Ali

Personal details
- Born: Syed Mohammad Ali Chowdhury; 19 October 1909 Backergunge District, Eastern Bengal and Assam, British India
- Died: 23 January 1963 (aged 53) Dacca, East Pakistan, Pakistan
- Resting place: Nawab Palace, Bogra, Bangladesh
- Citizenship: British Raj (1909–1947); Pakistan (1947–1963)
- Party: PMLC
- Other political affiliations: PML (1947–1958); AIML (pre-1947)
- Spouse(s): Hameeda Begum; Aliya Begum
- Parent: Altaf Ali Chowdhury (father)
- Relatives: Nawab Ali Chowdhury (grandfather); Hasan Ali Chowdhury (uncle); Syeda Ashiqua Akbar (cousin)
- Education: University of Calcutta (BA)
- Known for: Bogra formula
- Cabinet: Bogra administration

Syed Mohammad Ali Chowdhury Bogra (Note: Bengali: বগুড়া সৈয়দ মোহাম্মদ আলী চৌধুরী Urdu: سید محمد علی چوہدری بوگرا) (19 October 1909 – 23 January 1963) was a Pakistani politician and diplomat who served as the third prime minister of Pakistan from 1953 to 1955. He was appointed in this capacity in 1953 until he stepped down in 1955 in favour of his federal finance minister Chaudhri Muhammad Ali. (Note: Sources:)

After his education at the Presidency College at the University of Calcutta, he started his political career on Muslim League's platform and joined the Bengal's provincial cabinet of then-Prime Minister H. S. Suhrawardy in the 1940s. After the independence of Pakistan in 1947, he joined the foreign ministry as a diplomat and briefly tenured as Pakistan's ambassador to Burma (1948), High Commissioner to Canada (1949–1952), twice as ambassador to the United States, and as ambassador to Japan (1959–1962).

After he was recalled in 1953 from his services to Pakistan from the United States, he replaced Sir Khwaja Nazimuddin as Prime Minister in an appointment approved by then-Governor-General Sir Malik Ghulam. His foreign policy strongly pursued the strengthening of bilateral relations between Pakistan and the United States, while downplaying relations with the Soviet Union. He also pushed for a stronger military to achieve peace with India and took personal initiatives to prioritize relations with China. At home front, he successfully proposed the popular political formula that laid the foundation of the constitution in 1956 which made Pakistan a federal parliamentary republic. Despite his popular initiatives, he lost his support to then-acting governor-general Iskandar Ali Mirza who re-appointed him as Pakistani Ambassador to the United States which he served until 1959.

In 1962, he joined President Muhammad Ayub Khan's administration as the Foreign Minister of Pakistan until his death in 1963.

== Early life and education ==
Mohammad Ali was born in Backerganj (now Barisal), East Bengal, British India, on 19 October 1909. He was born into an elite and wealthy aristocrat family who were known as the Nawabs of Dhanbari. The prefix, Sahibzada (lit. Prince) is added before his name to represent the Bengali royalty which is customary to give to individuals in India.

His father, Nawab Altaf Ali Chowdhury, educated at St Xavier's College in Calcutta, was a politician. Altaf Ali Chowdhury, was fond of horse races, dog shows, and sports. His grandfather, Nawab Ali Chowdhury, was also a politician who served as the first Bengali Muslim to be appointed as minister, and played a pioneering role in founding the Dhaka University along with Nawab Sir Khwaja Salimullah Bahadur of Dhaka.

Mohammad Ali Bogra grew up in Bogra, having studied first at the local Hastings House and then educated at the local madrassa in Calcutta. After his matriculation, Bogra went to attend the Presidency College of the Calcutta University where he secured his graduation with a BA degree in political science in 1930.

He was married twice: his first wife was Begum Hamida Mohammad Ali, with whom he had two sons. He later married Aliya Saddy in 1955. His second marriage led to widespread protests against polygamy by women organizations in the country.

== Early political career (1930–1947) ==
Before his entrance in the politics, the Bogra family were influential Nawabs active in Bengali politics and Muslim League as a party worker in 1930. In the 1937 Indian provincial elections he was elected to the Bengal Legislative Assembly. His uncle, Hasan Ali Chowdhury was also elected to the assembly, but from an opposing party.

In 1938, he was elected chairman of the Bogra District Board, a position he retained until June 1942. He served in the opposition until 1943 when the Muslim League had gained political support and he was made parliamentary secretary to then-Chief Minister Khawaja Nazimuddin. In 1946, he was asked by Husyn Suhrawardy to join his cabinet and subsequently held ministerial portfolio of health, finance, and local government. As health minister, he founded the Dhaka Medical College and the Calcutta Lake Medical College.

Bogra supported the Muslim League's call for creation of Pakistan through the partition of British India and successfully defended his constituency in the general elections held in 1945. In 1947, he joined the first Constituent Assembly. While in Dacca in 1948, he received Governor-General Muhammad Ali Jinnah and reportedly dissented on the issue of populist language movement being excluded as an official state language of Pakistan. He strongly advised Chief Minister Sir Khawaja Nazimuddin to restrain Jinnah from announcing the measure, but was rebuked.

== Diplomatic career (1947–1952) ==
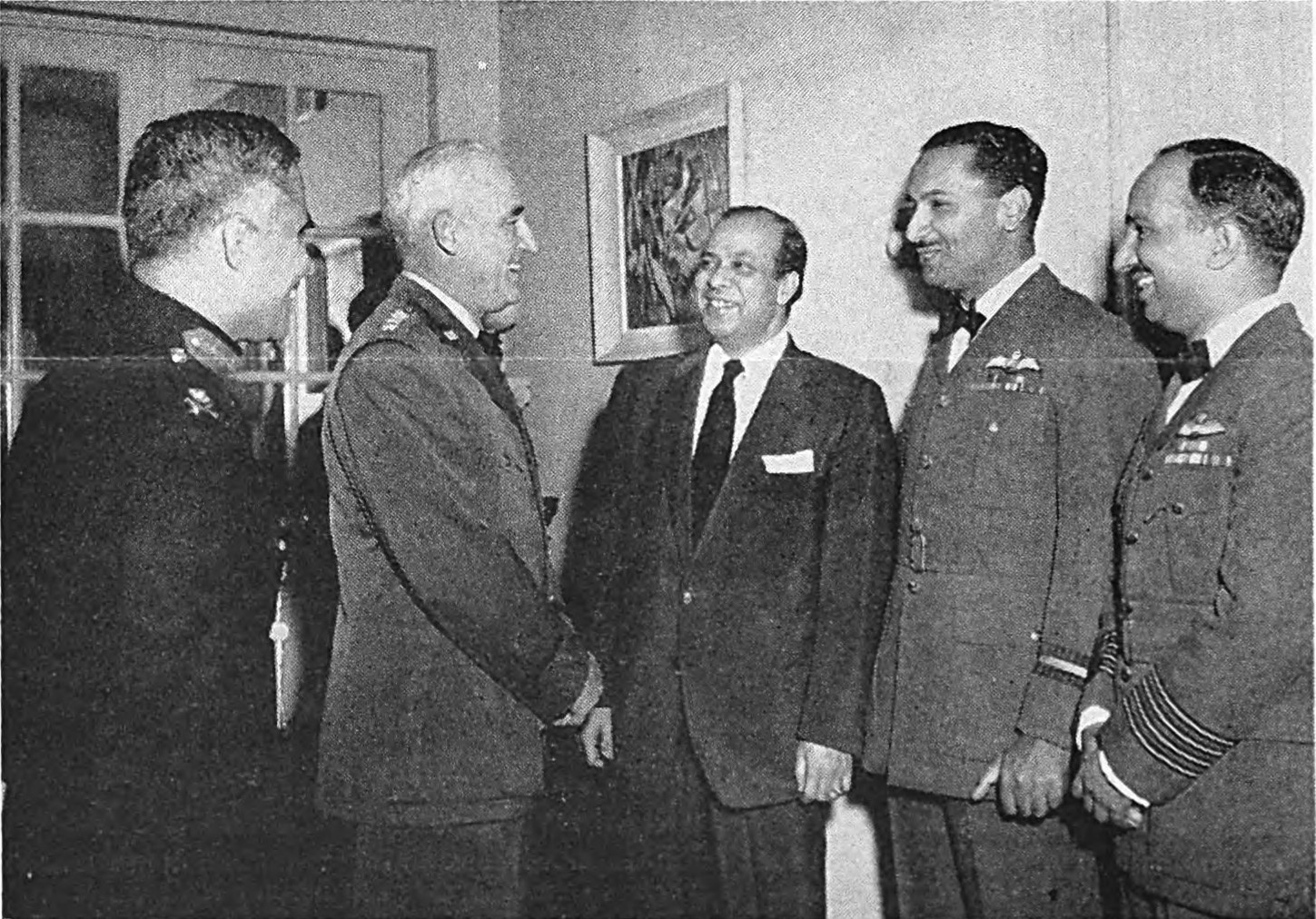
From left: Maj Gen Mian Hayaud Din, General Twining, Ambassador Bogra, Air Cdre Asghar Khan, and Gp Capt Akhtar. Pictured at a reception held in Khan's honor in Washington, D.C., after the announcement of his appointment as Chief of the Pakistan Air Force. Circa 21 April – May 1957

In 1948, Bogra was asked by Prime Minister Liaquat Ali Khan to be appointed the Pakistan ambassador to the Kingdom of Egypt to head the Pakistani diplomatic mission in Cairo, which Bogra declined. Instead, he chose the diplomatic assignment in neighboring Burma and presented his credentials in Rangoon in 1948. Soon after becoming Pakistan Ambassador to Burma, his political philosophy reflected a conservative mindset and took an anti-communist stance when he supported the Burma's military operations against the communists. In 1948, he showed concerns of communist expansion in Pakistan when he reportedly told Pakistani journalists that: "even [sic] if the Burmese Government succeed in suppressing the communists, it is possible they may shift the centre of communist efforts to Pakistan."

In 1949, he left Burma to become high commissioner to Canada, a position he held until 1952. In February 1952, he was made ambassador to the United States.

Watching the campaign for the 1952 United States presidency, Bogra conjectured, according to Husain Haqqani, that Pakistan could obtain economic and military aid from the United States by casting itself as a front line state in the battle to contain Soviet communism. He vigorously lobbied anticommunists in Washington, D.C. to that end. In Pakistan's political circle, he was seen as extremely having pro-American views and had fondness of the country, the United States. He also helped negotiate the United States' officer assistance advisory to be dispatch to Pakistan, in an agreement he signed with the United States government in 1952.

Bogra gained a reputation "for his excessive praise of everything American." Pakistani historians held him widely responsibly as one of the principal personalities putting Pakistan in the alliance of the United States against the Soviet Union. He was a little-known pro-American political outsider when Ghulam Muhammad chose him in 1953 to replace Khawaja Nazimuddin as prime minister.

== Premiership (1953–1955) ==
The issue of the Bengali Language Movement in East in 1952, the rise of the Pakistan Socialist Party, and the riots in Lahore against the Ahmadi in 1953 were the defining factors that led to the dismissal of Prime Minister Khawaja Nazimuddin by Governor-General Ghulam Muhammad on 17 April 1953.

Bogra was recalled to Karachi from Washington, D.C. for further consultation, but Governor-General Ghulam Muhammad moved to appoint him as the new prime minister and the President of the Muslim League, which the party had accepted. Under pressure he accepted the new appointment from Ghulam Muhammad. Initially, he kept the federal ministries of foreign affairs and defence until appointing a new cabinet. Upon taking over the government, Bogra dismissed the elected East Bengali government of A.K. Fazlul Huq on 30 May 1954 for "treasonable activities." He appointed then-defence secretary Iskander Mirza as the Governor of East Bengal, but this appointment only lasted a couple of months.

Bogra's new cabinet—known as the "Ministry of Talents"—included Commander-in-Chief of the Pakistan Army Ayub Khan as Defence Minister and Governor Iskander Ali Mirza as Interior Minister and Minister of States and Frontier Regions.

After Bogra's appointment, U.S. President Dwight Eisenhower ordered the shipment of thousands of tons of wheat to Pakistan. Bogra was eager to strengthen military ties with the United States; however, the U.S. moved cautiously to not damage their relations with India. He signed several agreement with the United States, most notably the Mutual Defense Assistance Agreement in 1954, which provided U.S. military assistance to Pakistan. During Bogra's premiership, Pakistan also joined the Southeast Asia Treaty Organization in 1955. His foreign policy was noted for strong "anti-Soviet agitation" because he viewed the Soviet Union as "imperialist", but did not label the same for China despite both being ideologically close. In 1955, Bogra helped organize and attended the Bandung Conference in Indonesia, expressing his approval for greater Afro-Asian cooperation and opposition to European colonialism.

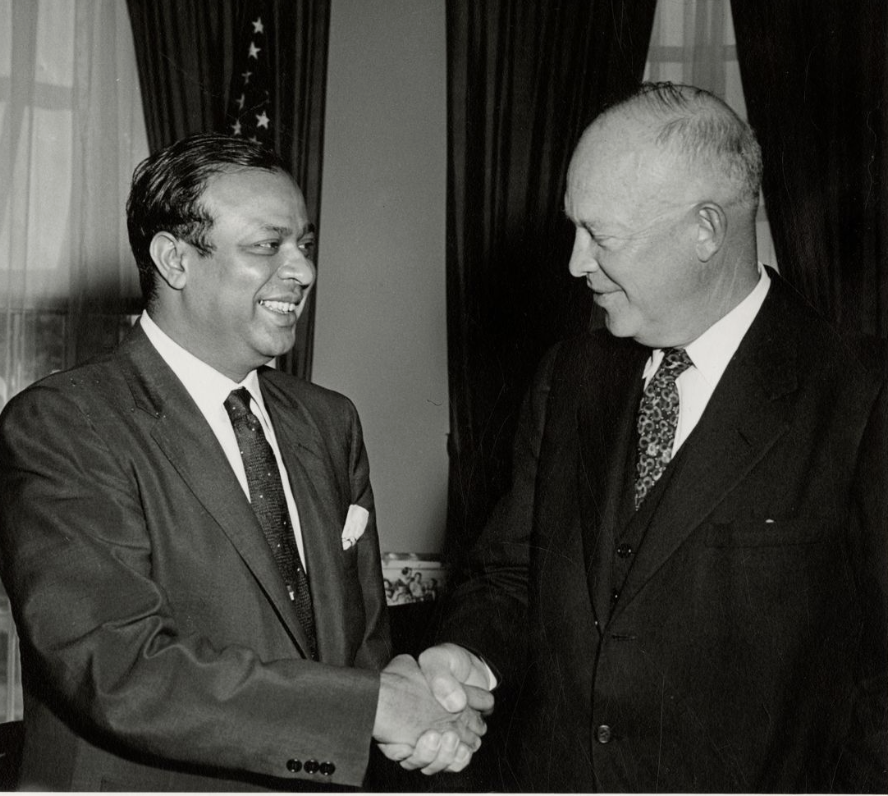
Bogra with U.S. President Dwight D. Eisenhower in the Oval Office, October 1954

Bogra sought to address and resolve the Kashmir conflict with India. In 1953, he met with Indian Prime Minister Jawaharlal Nehru on the sidelines of the Coronation of Queen Elizabeth II in London. Bogra also received Nehru when he paid an official visit to Karachi, and Nehru reciprocated during Bogra's visit to New Delhi shortly after. They discussed the possibility of a plebiscite in Kashmir, but were unable to agree on someone to oversee it.

As a part of his approach towards India, Bogra pushed for a stronger military to achieve peace in the subcontinent, arguing: "[w]hen there is more equality of military strength, then I am sure that there will be a greater chance of settlement."

=== Bogra formula ===
The Bogra Formula was a political compromise presented and proposed by Bogra on 7 October 1953 before the Constituent Assembly. Upon taking the control of the Prime Minister's Secretariat, Bogra announced that drafting of the codified Constitution was his primary target, and within six months, he announced a proposal that leads to the drafting of the constitution writ.

The framework proposed the establishment of more effective bicameral parliament that would be composed of a 300-seat National Assembly with proportionate representation based on population, alongside a Senate with equal representation for the five provinces: West Punjab, the North-West Frontier Province, Sind, Baluchistan, and East Bengal.

Under this framework, the largest number of constituencies for the National Assembly were given to East Bengal—with 165 reserved seats—followed by West Punjab with 75 seats, the North-West Frontier Province with 24 seats, Sind with 19 seats, and Baluchistan with 17 seats. The Federally Administered Tribal Areas, Federal Capital Territory, Bahawalpur, Khairpur, and Baluchistan States Union, were given a combined representation of 24 reserved seats. East Bengal was given more seats due to its social homogeneity in the National Assembly, in contrast to the reserved seats for the other provinces which were all were socially heterogeneous and ethnically diverse. However, the combined the reserved seats for the West Pakistani provinces were in balance with East Bengal in the bicameral parliament. Both the houses were given equal power, and in case of a conflict between the two houses, the issue was to be presented before a joint session.

The Bogra framework also created check and balances to avoid permanent domination by any of the five provinces, in which a provision was made that if the president was elected from the four provinces of West Pakistan, then the prime minister was to be elected from East Bengal, and vice versa. The president was to be elected for a term of 5 years through an Electoral College formed by both houses.

The Supreme Court was to be given more power and institutional judicial independence that would permanently replace the Islamic clergy to decide if a law was in accordance with Sharia.

The Bogra formula was highly popular and widely welcomed by the people as opposed to the Basic Principles Committee led by former Prime Minister Nazimuddin, as it was seen with great enthusiasm amongst the masses because it could bridge the differences between the two wings of Pakistan and act as a source of unity.

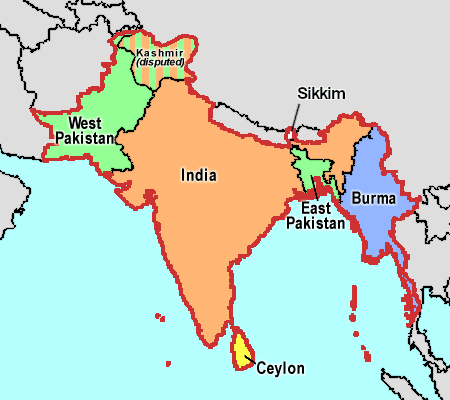
In 1955, the One Unit Scheme integrated the four provinces of the western wing of Pakistan into a single province: West Pakistan.

Despite its public popularity, Governor-General Ghulam Muhammad, threatened by a curbing of his powers, dissolved the Constituent Assembly in 1954 with the support of the Pakistani civil and military establishment.

=== One Unit policy ===
Following the failure to implement a constitutional formula, Bogra began working towards the controversial One Unit scheme that integrated the four West Pakistani provinces into a single province. He justified this scheme when he stated:

There will be no Bengalis, no Punjabis, no Sindhis, no Pathans, no Balochis, no Bahawalpuris, no Khairpuris. The disappearance of these groups will strengthen the integrity of Pakistan...

— Prime Minister M. A. Bogra, presenting the One Unit on 22 November 1954

The scheme was ultimately implemented by his successor, Chaudhri Muhammad Ali, in October 1955.

=== Dismissal ===
On 4 August 1955, the Cabinet accepted Governor-General Malik Ghulam Muhammad's request for a leave of absence due to ill health. They chose Interior Minister Iskander Mirza to replace him, and Mirza was sworn in as acting governor-general three days later.

Soon after the appointment, Mirza confronted Bogra on regional disparity despite the fact that both men were Bengalis, and forced Bogra to resign from the prime ministership. Mirza also dismissed Malik Ghulam Muhammad and sent a letter of notification to inform him of the political developments.

== Ambassador to the United States (1955–1959) ==
After his dismissal, Bogra was appointed the Pakistani Ambassador to the United States when he recalled Amjad Ali, who was appointed Finance Minister.

== Foreign Minister (1962–63) ==
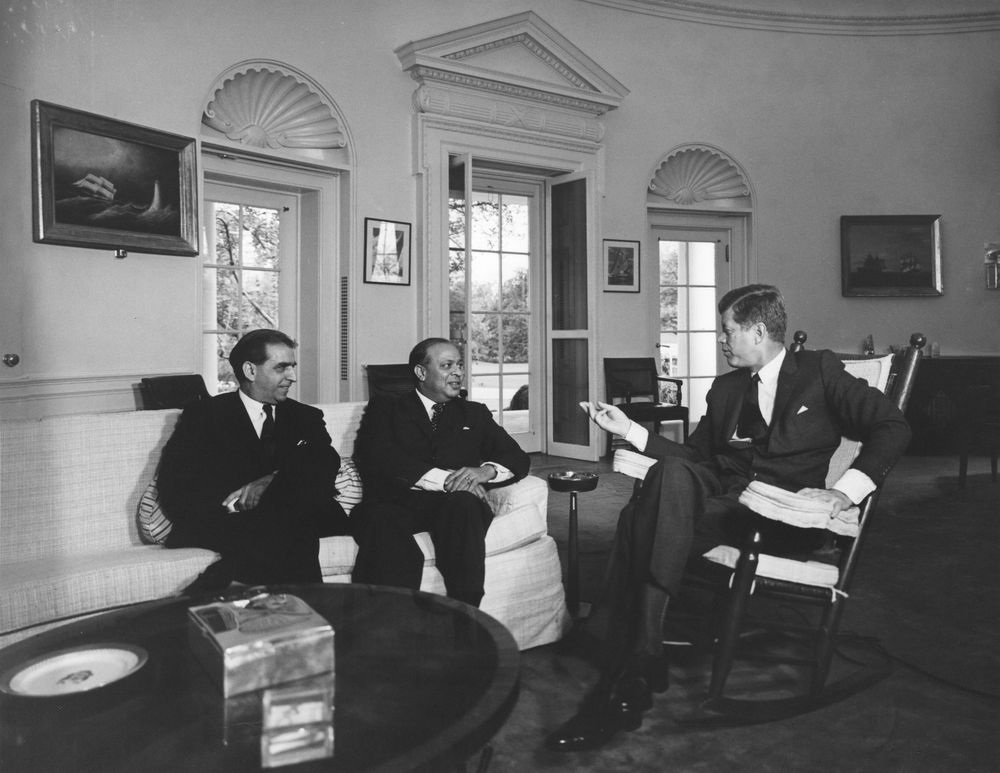
Bogra with U.S. President John F. Kennedy at the White House, 1962

In 1959, he left the ambassadorial assignment after the then-Chief Martial Law Administrator Ayub Khan took control of the government from President Iskander Mirza in 1958. Ayub appointed Bogra foreign minister.

Soon after his appointment, he visited China where he continued talks with the Chinese leadership that eventually led to a settlement with China regarding the China–Pakistan border. As foreign minister, he guided a pro-Western policy but made efforts to improve relations with the Soviet Union. Bogra said in 1962 that there was no such thing as friends forever or enemies forever– only national interests count.

During this time, his health became a serious issue and illness caused him to miss out the meeting over Kashmir but his deputy Zulfikar Ali Bhutto attended in the United States on 26 December 1962. In 1963, Bogra died while staying in Dacca and was buried at the Bogra Nawab Palace in East Pakistan, now Bangladesh.

== Personal life ==
Ali was married twice; his first wife was Begum Hamida Mohammed Ali, and his second wife was a Lebanese lady, Aliya Begum. This marriage was controversial because it constituted polygamy, which was uncommon among the elites of Pakistan.

== Death ==
Bogra died on 23 January 1963 in Dacca. Politician Ajmal Ali Choudhury offered condolences and felt "deep sorrow" for the sudden death.

== Notes ==
Diplomatic posts
Preceded by Abol Hassan Ispahani	Ambassador to the United States; 1952–1953	Succeeded by Amjad Ali
Preceded by Amjad Ali	Ambassador to the United States; 1955–1959	Succeeded by Aziz Ahmed
Political offices
Preceded by Khawaja Nazimuddin	Prime Minister of Pakistan; 1953–1955	Succeeded by Chaudhry Muhammad Ali
Preceded by Khawaja Nazimuddin	Minister of Defence; 1953–1954	Succeeded by Ayub Khan
Preceded by Sir Muhammad Zafarullah Khan	Minister of Foreign Affairs; 1954–1955	Succeeded by Hamidul Huq Choudhury
Preceded by Manzur Qadir	Minister of Foreign Affairs; 1962–1963	Succeeded by Zulfikar Ali Bhutto
