= Syed Nawab Ali Chowdhury =

Nawab of Dhanbari of Tangail in East Bengal (1863–1929) (r. 1911–1929)

Nawab Bahadur Syed Nawab Ali Chowdhury CIE
- সৈয়দ নওয়াব আলী চৌধুরী
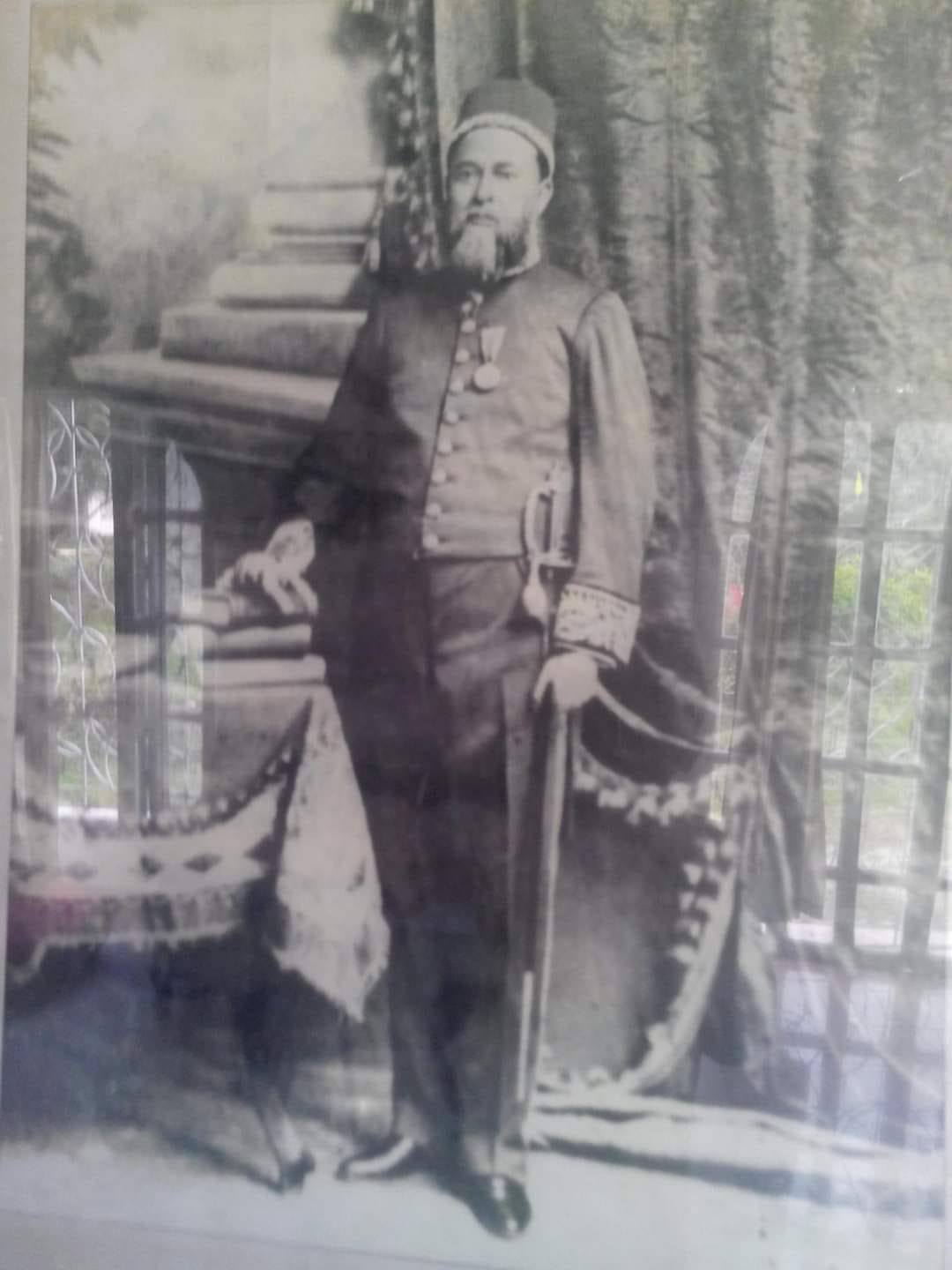

Nawab of Dhanbari
- In office 1911 – 17 April 1929
- Preceded by: Syed Jonab Ali Chowdhury
- Succeeded by: Altaf Ali Chowdhury

Personal details
- Born: 29 December 1863 Dhanbari, Bengal, British India
- Died: 17 April 1929 (aged 65) Darjeeling, Bengal, British India
- Children: Altaf Ali Chowdhury; Hasan Ali Chowdhury
- Relatives: Muhammad Ali Bogra (grandson); Syeda Ashiqua Akbar (granddaughter)
- Occupation: Minister of Education

Syed Nawab Ali Chowdhury CIE (29 December 1863 – 17 April 1929) was Bengali politician, educationist, author, and zamindar who held the title of Nawab of Dhanbari of Tangail in East Bengal (modern day Bangladesh). He was the first Muslim minister of undivided Bengal and served in several legislative and administrative positions. A prominent advocate for Muslim education, he played an important role in the establishment of the University of Dhaka and supported educational institutions across Bengal. He was also involved in Bengali literary activities as a writer, publisher, and patron of authors.

== Early life ==
Nawab Ali Chowdhury was born in Dhanbari, Tangail to a zamindar family. 250 years prior to his birth his great grandfather Shah Syed Khuda Bokhs settled in Dhanbari. Nawab Ali Chowdhury studied Arabic, Persian, and Bengali. He went to Rajshahi Collegiate School and later graduated from St. Xavier's College.

== Career ==
He was one of the founders of Dhaka University. He was the first Muslim minister of united Bengal. He served as minister of education. His grandson Muhammad Ali Bogra became the third prime minister of Pakistan. His son, and Bogra's uncle, Syed Hasan Ali Chowdhury, was a minister of East Pakistan government and MP of the second Bangladesh Jatiyo Sangshad.

=== Author ===
He engaged in literary and cultural activities from 1895 to 1904. In 1895 the newspapers Mihir and Shudhakar became Mihir-Shudhakar. Chowdhury was its owner. He bought a press and installed it at his house in Calcutta. He contributed in the work of Muhammad Shahidullah, Reazuddin Ahmed al-Mashhadi, and the poet Md. Mozammel Haque. These writers dedicated some of their writings to Chowdhury.

Chowdhury initially prepared a Bengali explanation of Eid prayers and Qurbani for an Eid gathering. His writing was later published in Sudhakar under the title Eid Kahini. Chowdhury subsequently expanded the work and published it as a book titled Eid ul Azha.

Vernacular Education in Bengal (1900) was based on an Urdu paper he presented at the Muhammadan Educational Conference in Calcutta in December 1899. He prepared an English version after Lieutenant-Governor John Woodburn expressed interest in reading it. The publication also included translated extracts from Bengali textbooks to support his arguments.

His published works include:

- Eid ul Azha (1890) (Available on Bengali Wikisource)
- Maulud Sharif (1903)
- Vernacular Education in Bengal (1900) (Read online)
- Primary Education in Rural Areas (1906)
- Some Moral and Religious Teachings of Imam Al-Ghazzali (1920)

=== Politics ===
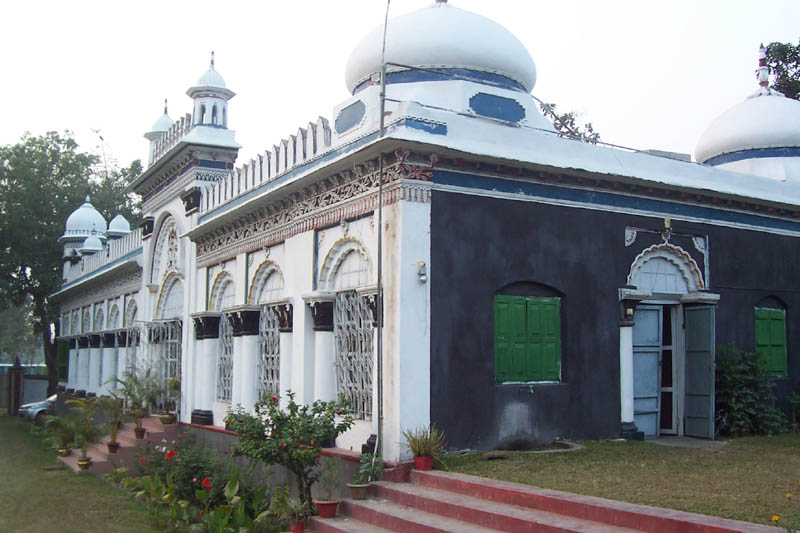
Meeting room of nawab estate. Lord Hardinge met Nawab Ali Chowdhury here. The room is decorated like the meeting date.

He took part in politics after the Partition of Bengal. Despite opposition from Hindu Nationalists, a new province named Bengal and Assam was created. Chowdhury joined an all-Indian Muslim political organization. He condemned illiteracy as the cause of Muslim backwardness. Following the reunification of Bengal, Chowdhury was elected one of the secretaries of the newly united Bengal Presidency Muslim League in 1912, alongside Zahid Suhrawardy. Chowdhury represented the Muslims of Eastern Bengal in the Simla Deputation of 1906, which sought greater Muslim representation in legislative councils. He later opposed the Lucknow Pact of 1916, arguing that its provisions for Muslim representation disadvantaged the Muslim-majority province of Bengal. In protest against the agreement, he resigned as president of the Bengal Provincial Muslim League in 1917.

=== University of Dhaka ===
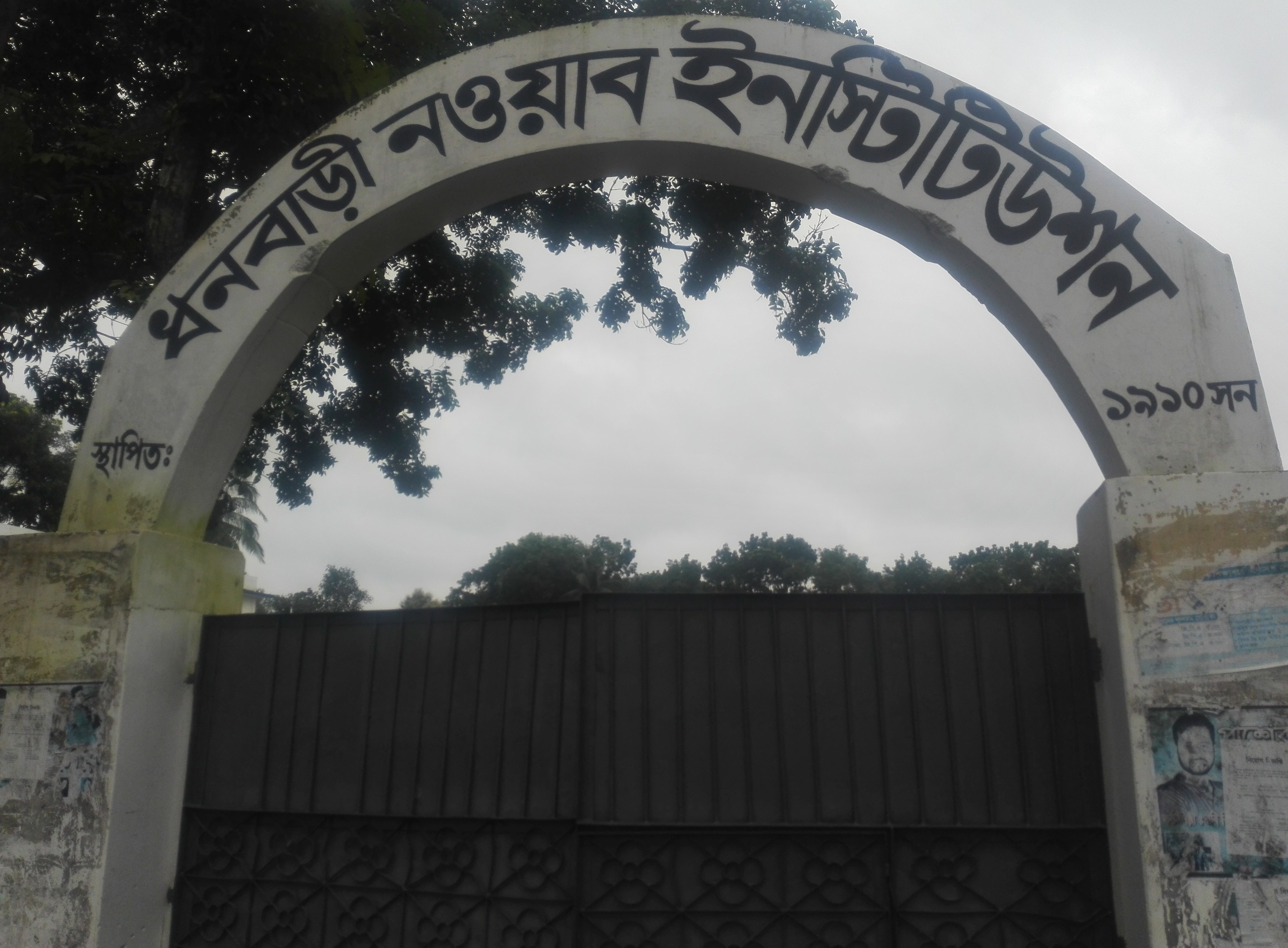
Gate of dhanbari Nawab institution founded on 1910

On 29 August 1911 at a ceremony of farewell to Lanchet Heir and reception of Charles Bailey, Nawab Sir Salimullah and Chowdhury demanded the establishment of a university in Dhaka. On 31 January 1912, at the time of Lord Hardinge's visit to Dhaka a committee of 19 members including Salimullah and Chowdhury met him and explained to him that Muslims have suffered because of the reunification of Bengal.

For this a 13 member Nathan Committee was formed and Chowdhury became a member. He participated in six subcommittees, including those responsible for Bengali, Islamic Studies, scholarships, and the proposed Muhammadan College. He also co-signed proposals advocating increased scholarships for Muslim students, greater Muslim representation in university administration, and the affiliation of colleges from eastern Bengal with the proposed university. In February 1912, Chowdhury corresponded with Salimullah about gathering support for the proposed university. He urged Salimullah to contact Muslim associations, conveyed support from Aga Khan III and described his efforts to secure support from the All-India Muslim League and its provincial branches.

World War I broke out in 1914 and derailed the establishment of University of Dhaka. Chowdhury was a member of the imperial council. In 1917 he renewed his proposal for the University of Dhaka. The Assembly passed Dhaka University Act in 1920. Class started in 1921. Chowdhury gave 16,000 taka to the University for scholarships. He mortgaged a part of his zamidari and gave another 35,000 taka to the university.

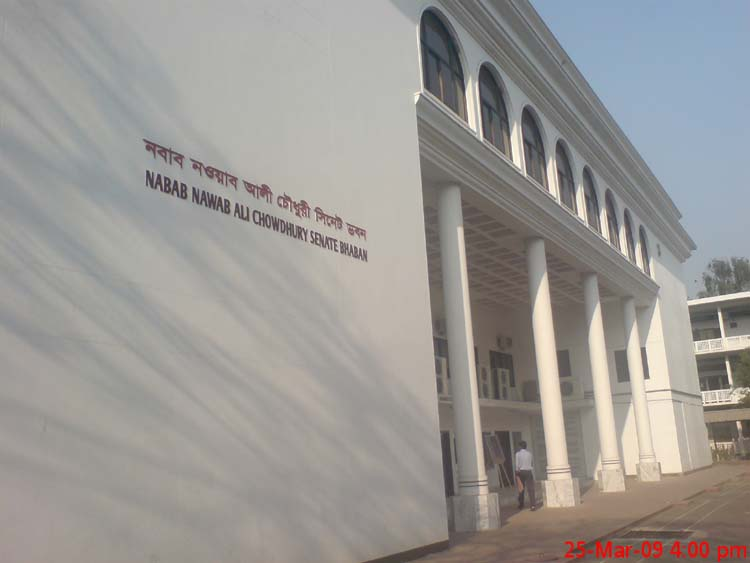
Nawab Ali Chowdhury Senate Building, University of Dhaka

On 9 June 2003, university syndicate decided to name the senate building Syed Nawab Ali Chowdhury Building.

=== Ministerial career ===
Before his appointment as a minister, Chowdhury published a pamphlet opposing the Non-Cooperation Movement and supporting constitutional reforms. According to Surendranath Banerjea, Governor Lord Ronaldshay sought a representative from Eastern Bengal for his ministry, and Chowdhury's support for the reforms contributed to his appointment. In his autobiography A Nation in Making, Banerjea also described their working relationship as cordial and cooperative, despite their opposing positions on the Partition of Bengal and communal representation.

Chowdhury served as Bengal's Minister for Agriculture and Industries from 1921 to 1923. During his tenure, he supported agricultural research and the distribution of improved seeds. He also worked to expand agricultural education, including plans to establish a higher agricultural institute in Dhaka and upgrade agricultural schools at Dhaka and Chinsura. The two schools were upgraded in 1922, although the proposed institute was not established due to financial constraints.

He was appointed a minister again in March 1925 and subsequently joined the Governor's Executive Council, serving until his death in 1929. His later responsibilities included agriculture, industries, forestry, immigration, Hajj administration, excise and registration.

== Work for education ==
Chowdhury was the first Muslim minister of united Bengal. He was given the office of education minister because of his role in promoting education. He held this post until his death. He helped 38 educational institutions. In 1910, he established high school Nawab Institute in Dhanbari. He contributed to establish many other educational institutes.

In his 1900 book Vernacular Education in Bengal, Chowdhury criticized Bengali school textbooks for what he considered negative portrayals of Islam and Muslim history. He called for more books by Muslim authors and changes to the textbook selection process. He also emphasized the need for practical education in agriculture, technical skills, and commerce to help rural students prepare for employment.

Chowdhury was also a member of the University of Calcutta Senate. During the Calcutta University Commission of 1917–1919, he submitted evidence concerning Muslim representation in the university, highlighting the low number of Muslim examiners appointed in 1917.

== Death ==
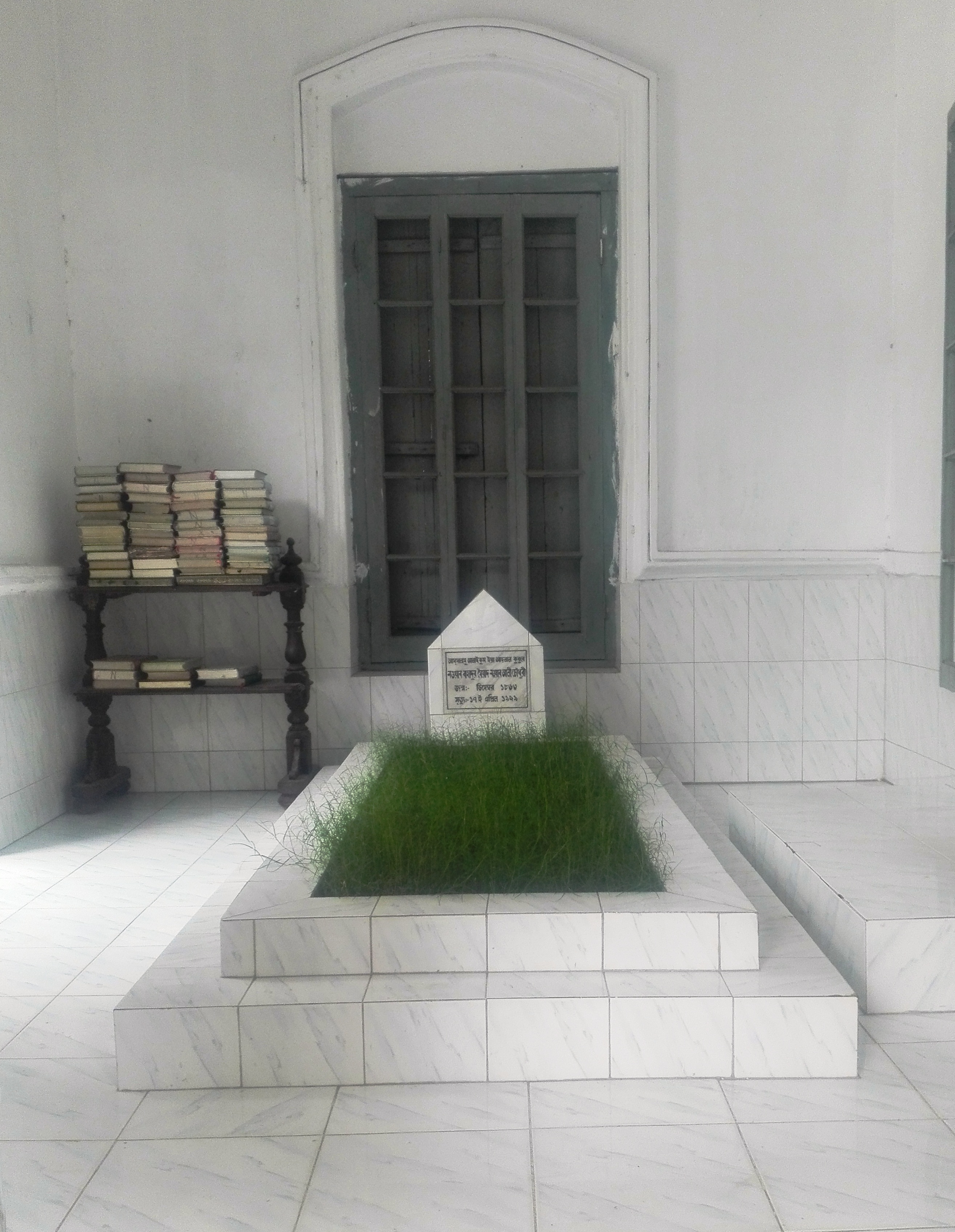
Tomb of Nawab Ali Chowdhury

Nawab Ali Chowdhury died on 17 April 1929 at Eden Castle in Darjeeling.
