= Myanmar–Pakistan relations =

- Pakistan: Myanmar

Myanmar–Pakistan relations are the bilateral relations between Myanmar and Pakistan. Both countries are members of the Non-Aligned Movement and Group of 77. Pakistan has an embassy in Yangon. Myanmar has an embassy in Islamabad.

== History ==
The bilateral relations were established between Burma and Pakistan on 14 August 1947, when they shared a border with each other when East Pakistan existed. Since 1988 both have embassies in each other's capitals. A historic fact that after the creation of Pakistan in 1947, Ambassador of Myanmar, U Pe Khin, was the first ever envoy to present his credentials to Governor-General of Pakistan Muhammad Ali Jinnah.

=== Early separatist insurgency ===
In May 1946, Muslim leaders from Arakan, Burma (present-day Rakhine State, Myanmar) met with Muhammad Ali Jinnah, the founder of Pakistan, and asked for the formal annexation of two townships in the Mayu region, Buthidaung and Maungdaw, by East Pakistan (present-day Bangladesh). Two months later, the North Arakan Muslim League was founded in Akyab (present-day Sittwe, capital of Rakhine State), which also asked Jinnah to annex the region. Jinnah refused, saying he could not interfere with Burma's internal matters. After Jinnah's refusal, proposals were made by Muslims in Arakan to the newly formed post-independence government of Burma, asking for the concession of the two townships to Pakistan. The proposals were rejected by the Burmese parliament.

Local mujahideen were subsequently formed against the Burmese government, and began targeting government soldiers stationed in the area. Led by Mir Kassem, the newly formed mujahideen movement began gaining territory, driving out local Rakhine communities from their villages, some of whom fled to East Pakistan.

In November 1948, martial law was declared in the region, and the 5th Battalion of the Burma Rifles and the 2nd Chin Battalion were sent to liberate the area. By June 1949, the Burmese government's control over the region was reduced to the city of Akyab, whilst the mujahideen had possession of nearly all of northern Arakan. After several months of fighting, Burmese forces were able to push the mujahideen back into the jungles of the Mayu region, near the country's border with East Pakistan.

In 1950, the Pakistani government warned its counterparts in Burma about their treatment of Muslims in Arakan. Burmese prime minister U Nu immediately sent a Muslim diplomat, Pe Khin, to negotiate a memorandum of understanding. In 1954, Kassem was arrested by Pakistani authorities, and many of his followers surrendered to the government.

The post-independence government accused the mujahideen of encouraging the illegal immigration of thousands of Bengalis from East Pakistan into Arakan during their rule of the area, a claim that has been highly disputed over the decades, as it brings into question the legitimacy of the Rohingya as an ethnic group of Myanmar.

== Diplomatic relations ==
Pakistan International Airlines has flown to Yangon in the past and still operates Hajj charter flights on behalf of the Burmese government. Burma provided a route for the evacuation of the Dacca-based Pakistani Army Aviation Squadron after the Indian takeover.

On 26 July 2012, a threat was made by the Tehreek-e-Taliban Pakistan that they would attack Myanmar unless Pakistan severed relations with the Burmese government including closing the Myanmar embassy in Islamabad. This was in response to what they perceived to be crimes against the Rohingya people.

== Economic relations ==
During the 1950-60s, trade between Myanmar (then Burma) and Pakistan was the largest among the Southeast Asian countries. However, over the years, trade between Myanmar and Pakistan deteriorated. In 1995, bilateral trade was US$31001010192824 million, it declined to US$10 million in 1999. Later, in 2000, trade improved to US$24 million. The present trade volume between Myanmar and Pakistan is US$70 million, far less than their latent potentials. Myanmar's exports to Pakistan are fruits, vegetable products, wood, seafood, jute and other textile fibers, and medicinal plants. Pakistan's exports to Myanmar include military technology, medicament mixtures, cement, medicinal plants, leather, cotton fabrics, and electro-medical apparatus.

In January 2012, then Pakistani president Asif Ali Zardari visited Myanmar. The visit focused on enhancing trade between the two countries. The Pakistani side proposed a Preferential Trading Area (PTA) along with a Free Trade Agreement (FTA). Establishment of a joint ministerial commission as well as cooperation in the oil and gas sector was also proposed. A Bilateral Agreement in Science and Technology exists between the two states. It was inked during former president General Pervez Musharraf's visit to Myanmar in May 2001.

== Security relations ==
Myanmar has developed military level relations with Pakistan. Pakistan trains Myanmar military personnel in military tactics at various institutions throughout Pakistan as well as both countries are undergoing a deal to purchase Pakistani fighter jets.

Pakistan has taught submarine skills to the Myanmar Navy. It was reported in June 2013 that around 20 officers from Myanmar Navy visited Karachi in late April/early May to begin basic submarine training with Pakistan Navy at PNS Bahadur.

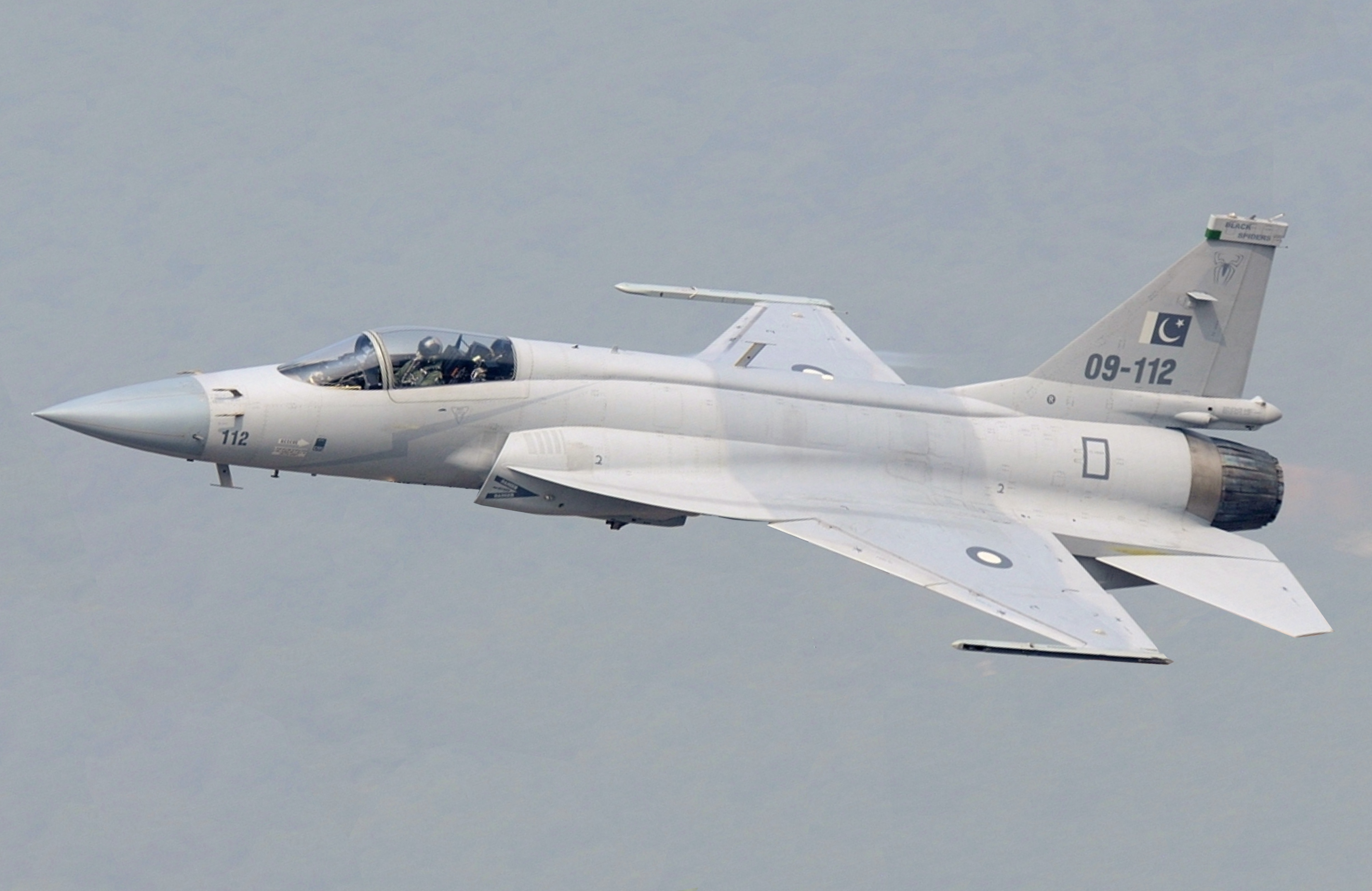
Similar Pakistani JF-17 Thunder fighter are on order by Myanmar Air Force.

In August 2014, Air Chief Marshal Tahir Rafique Butt paid the first ever visit by a serving Pakistan Air Force (PAF) chief to Myanmar where he met his counterpart General Khin Aung Myint, Commander-in-Chief of Myanmar Air Force. Both air chiefs discussed matters of professional interest. The PAF chief was introduced to various Principal Staff Officers (PSOs) of the Myanmar Air Force along with visits to an operational air base and several maintenance facilities.

On May 7, 2015, General Min Aung Hlaing, Commander-in-Chief of Myanmar Armed Force, visited Pakistan with a high-level military delegation. Among others, he met Chairman Joint Chiefs of Staff Committee General Rashad Mahmood, Chief of Army Staff General Raheel Sharif, Chief of Air Staff Air Chief Marshal Sohail Aman and Chief of Naval Staff Admiral Muhammad Zakaullah to discuss avenues of cooperation in a variety of military spheres. In particular, he discussed regional and “local” issues with the Pakistani Joint Chief. Although no specific details have been made available, it can be speculated that the issue of Rohingya Muslims and threats from India were discussed.

On May 21, 2015, Commander-in-Chief of Myanmar Air Force General Khin Aung Myint visited Air Headquarters, Islamabad to discuss matters of mutual interest with PAF Air Chief Air Chief Marshal Sohail Aman; Myint reciprocated the earlier visit to Myanmar by Sohail Aman's predecessor. Later, he also visited Pakistan Aeronautical Complex, Kamra where he and his team were given a detailed tour of the premises, especially the Sino-Pak JF-17 Thunder jet program. It seems the Myanmar Air Force delegation was so impressed with the JF-17 Thunder jet that they placed orders for 16 fighter jets, thus making Myanmar the first foreign buyer of the advanced fighter jet.

=== Military Base ===
On June 11, 2017, Indian Army Chief General Bipin Rawat while asked about a recent report from the Pentagon which said China may build ports in Pakistan, the Army chief said: "Everyone is interested in getting access to the Indian Ocean Region. Pakistan is also building strategic ports in Myanmar."
