= Abdus Sattar Khan Chowdhury =

Bangladeshi politician

Member of Bangladesh Parliament
- In office 1979–1986

Personal details
- Born: 1 June 1926 (age 100) Natore, Bengal Presidency, British India
- Party: Bangladesh Nationalist Party

Abdus Sattar Khan Chowdhury (Bengali: আবদুস সাত্তার খান চৌধুরী) is a Bangladesh Nationalist Party politician and a former member of parliament for Rajshahi-16.

== Biography ==
Abdus Sattar Khan Chowdhury was born on 1 June 1926 in Natore, Bengal Presidency, British India.

Chowdhury was elected to parliament from Rajshahi-16 as a Bangladesh Nationalist Party candidate in 1979.
