= Ashraf Ali Khan Chowdhury =

Bengali lawyer and politician

- আশরফ আলী খান চৌধুরী
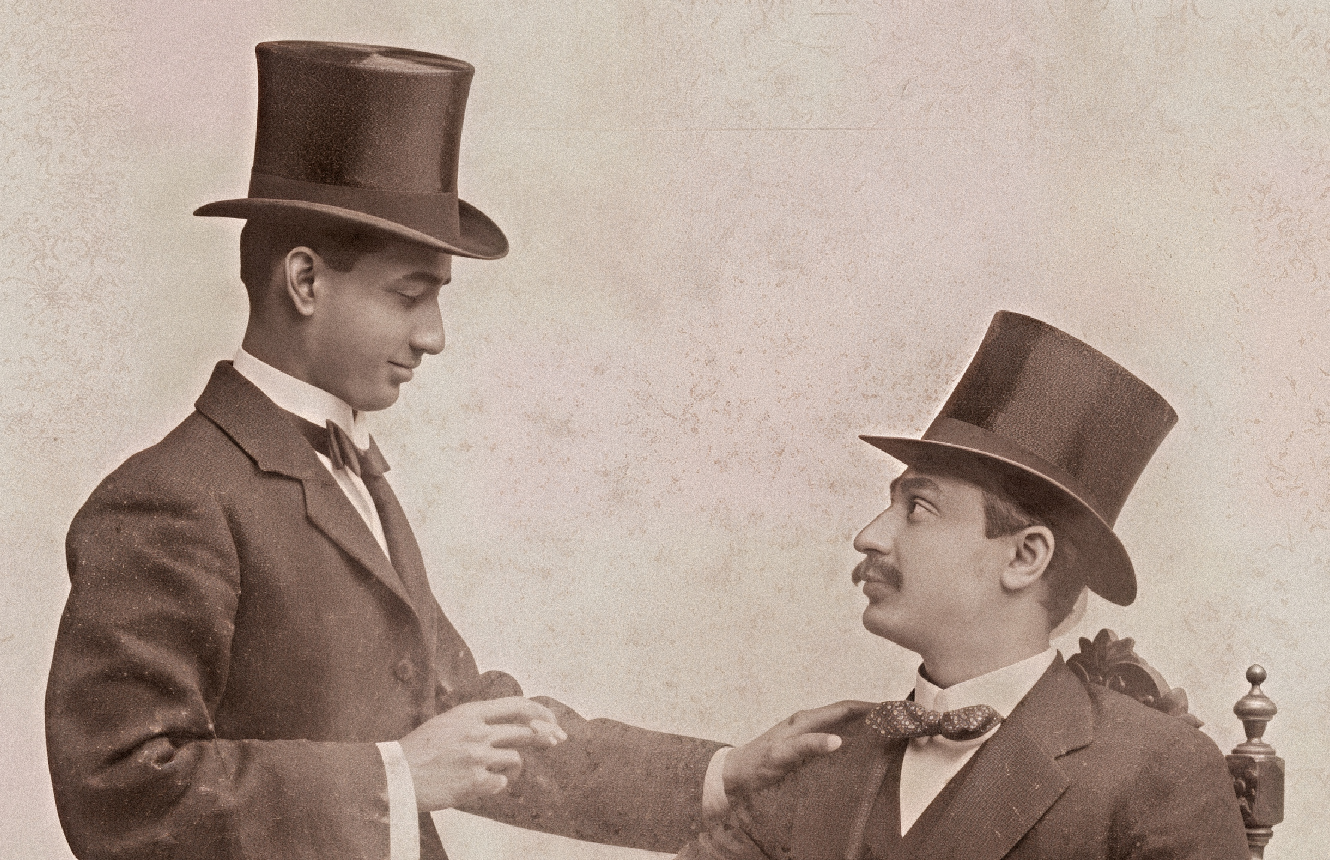
- A. S. M. Latifur Rahman and Ashraf Ali Khan Chowdhury at Inns of Court.

Member of the Bengal Legislative Assembly
- In office 1937–1941
- Prime Minister: A. K. Fazlul Huq
- Governor: Michael Knatchbull, 5th Baron Brabourne
- Constituency: Natore

Member of the Bengal Legislative Council
- In office 1928–1936
- Governor: Sir Francis Stanley Jackson
- Constituency: Natore

Personal details
- Born: 10 January 1878 Natore, Bengal, British India
- Died: 8 December 1941 (aged 63) Calcutta, Bengal, British India
- Party: All-India Muslim League
- Relatives: Hamoodur Rahman (son-in-law), Hameedur Rahman (grandson)
- Education: Inns of Court, Inner Temple

Ashraf Ali Khan Chowdhury (Bengali: আশরফ আলী খান চৌধুরী; 1878 – 8 December 1941) was a Bengali lawyer and politician.

== Early life ==
Chowdhury was born in 1878 to a Bengali Muslim zamindar family known as the Chowdhuries of Natore. His father was Khan Bahadur Ershad Ali Khan Chowdhury, a member of the Bengal Legislative Council. He was called to the bar at London's Inns of Court and became a barrister in 1912.

== Career ==
Chowdhury started his legal career by joining the Calcutta High Court bar. Introduced to politics by his father and under the patronage of Syed Nawab Ali Chowdhury, Khan Chowdhury was a founding member of the East Bengal and Assam Provincial Muslim Educational Society. In 1928, he was elected to the Bengal Legislative Council, representing Natore. In 1932, Khan Chowdhury declined an offer of a judgeship at the Calcutta High Court, choosing to pursue a career in politics. In 1937, he was re-elected to the Bengal Legislative Assembly from Natore District as a candidate of the All India Muslim League. He served as the Deputy Speaker of the Bengal Legislative Assembly.

== Personal life ==
Khan Chowdhury had seven children, including one son and six daughters. His daughter Rabia married jurist Hamoodur Rahman, who later served as Chief Justice of Pakistan from 1968 to 1975 and led Pakistan's War Enquiry Commission following the conclusion of the Bangladesh genocide.

== Death ==
Chowdhury died on 8 December 1941 in Kolkata, West Bengal, British India.
