= Dhanbari =

Dhanbari ধনবাড়ী
- Town
- Location within Bangladesh
- Coordinates: 24.6167°N 90.0250°E
- Country: Bangladesh
- Division: Dhaka Division
- District: Tangail District
- Upazila: Dhanbari Upazila
- Incorporated: 1999

Government
  - Type: Pourashava
  - Present Mayor: Moniruzzaman Bokol.
  - First Mayor: Badiul Alam Monju (Bangladesh Awami League)

Area
  - Total: 25.62 km^{2} (9.89 sq mi)

Population
  - Total: 36,125
  - Density: 1,410/km^{2} (3,652/sq mi)
- Time zone: UTC+6 (BST)
- Postal codes: 1997
- Area code: 9229
- Website: dhanbari.tangail.gov.bd

Dhanbari Municipality mahallah geocode map

Dhanbari (Bengali: ধনবাড়ী) is a town of Dhanbari Upazila, Tangail, Bangladesh. The town is situated 63 km northeast of Tangail city and 143 km northwest of Dhaka city, the capital of Bangladesh.

== Education ==
The literacy rate of Dhanbari town is 70% (Male-53.8%, Female-50.8%).
