= Bogoridi =

Bogoridi is a surname. Notable people with the surname include:

- Alexander Bogoridi (1822–1910), Ottoman statesman of Bulgarian origin, son of Stefan
- Emanuil Bogoridi (1847–1935), alternate name for Emanoil Vogoride-Conachi, Romanian aristocrat and politician
- Nicolae Bogoridi (1820–1863), alternate rendering of Nicolae Vogoride, caimacam (prince) of Moldavia 1857–1858
- Stefan Bogoridi (1775 or 1780–1859), Ottoman statesman of Bulgarian origin
