= Emanoil Vogoride-Conachi =

Romanian aristocrat and politician (1847–1935)

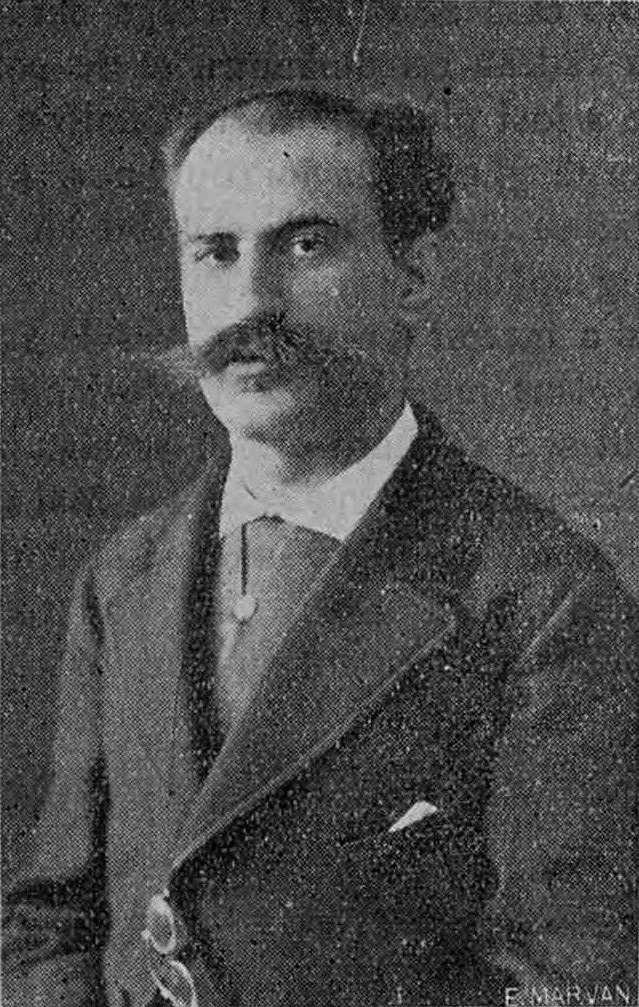

Member of the Chamber of Deputies of Romania
- In office 1871–1887

Personal details
- Born: 10 April 1847 Țigănești, Moldavia
- Died: 19 July 1935 (age 88) Paris, France
- Parent(s): Nicolae Vogoride; Ecaterina (Cocuța) Conachi
- Occupation: Aristocrat, politician

Prince Emanoil (or Emanuel, Emanuil) Vogoride-Conachi (also Bogoridi, Vogoridis, Bulgarian: Емануил Богориди-Конаки; 10 April 1847 – 19 July 1935) was a Romanian aristocrat and politician, best known as a claimant to the throne of the Principality of Bulgaria in 1878 and 1887. He was the son of Nicolae Vogoride, caimacam of Moldavia, and Ecaterina (Cocuța) Conachi, daughter of the logothete Costache Conachi, belonging to one of the oldest Moldavian boyar families.

== Origins and family ==
Emanoil Vogoride-Conachi came from an extremely wealthy family, with branches both in the Danubian Principalities and in the Balkans. On his paternal side, the Vogoride family was of Bulgarian origin, originating from the Tarnovo region, later becoming Phanariot through settlement in the Phanar district of Constantinople and integration into the Ottoman administrative elite. His grandfather was Ștefan Vogoride, while his father, Nicolae Vogoride, served as caimacam of Moldavia.

On his maternal side, Emanoil was the grandson of Costache Conachi, a poet and prominent Moldavian boyar. His mother, Ecaterina (Cocuța) Conachi, played a crucial role in exposing the falsification of the 1857 ad-hoc Divan elections, contributing decisively to the Union of the Romanian Principalities in 1859. This led to an open conflict with her husband, Nicolae Vogoride.

Emanoil was the eldest of the couple’s three children. His sisters were:

- Maria Vogoride (1851–1931), wife of the Greek count Petros de Romas;
- Lucia Vogoride (1855–1938), married successively to Nicolae Rosetti-Roznovanu and to the Conservative politician Dimitrie Greceanu.

== Education and personal life ==
Born in 1847 at the Conachi estate in Țigănești (Tecuci County), Emanoil Vogoride-Conachi received a Western-style education, studying in Paris. He spent much of his life in France and Austria, residing for long periods in Paris and Vienna. He spoke the Bulgarian language and maintained contacts with Bulgarian political and intellectual circles.

He was married twice: first to Olga Sturdza, daughter of Grigore Sturdza, and later to Countess Sophie von Puysegur, the widow of a German count. He had no children. Toward the end of his life, he sold most of his properties in Romania, including the Țigănești estate, which was sold to Tache Anastasiu.

== Political activity in Romania ==
Although he did not have a particularly notable political career, Emanoil Vogoride-Conachi served as deputy for Tecuci in the legislatures of 1871 and 1875, at a time when parliamentary mandates were often granted on social rather than strictly electoral grounds. His parliamentary activity was limited, and he was frequently absent, as he spent much of his time in Paris.

== Claims to the Bulgarian throne ==
Emanoil Vogoride-Conachi is chiefly remembered for his attempts to ascend the Bulgarian throne in the context of the political reorganization of the Balkans following the Russo-Turkish War (1877–1878).

In 1878, after the Treaty of Berlin (1878), Bulgaria became an autonomous principality under Ottoman suzerainty. Vogoride was among the official candidates for the throne, relying on his family’s Bulgarian origins and on international diplomatic support. However, Russia supported Prince Alexander of Battenberg, who was elected by the National Assembly of Bulgaria in April 1879.

In 1887, following the forced abdication of Alexander I of Bulgaria, and after failing to secure another parliamentary mandate in Romania, Emanoil Vogoride-Conachi again emerged as a claimant, alongside his uncle Alexander Bogoridi. On this occasion, the Bulgarians opted for another foreign prince, Ferdinand of Saxe-Coburg and Gotha.

== Relations with the Bulgarian national movement ==
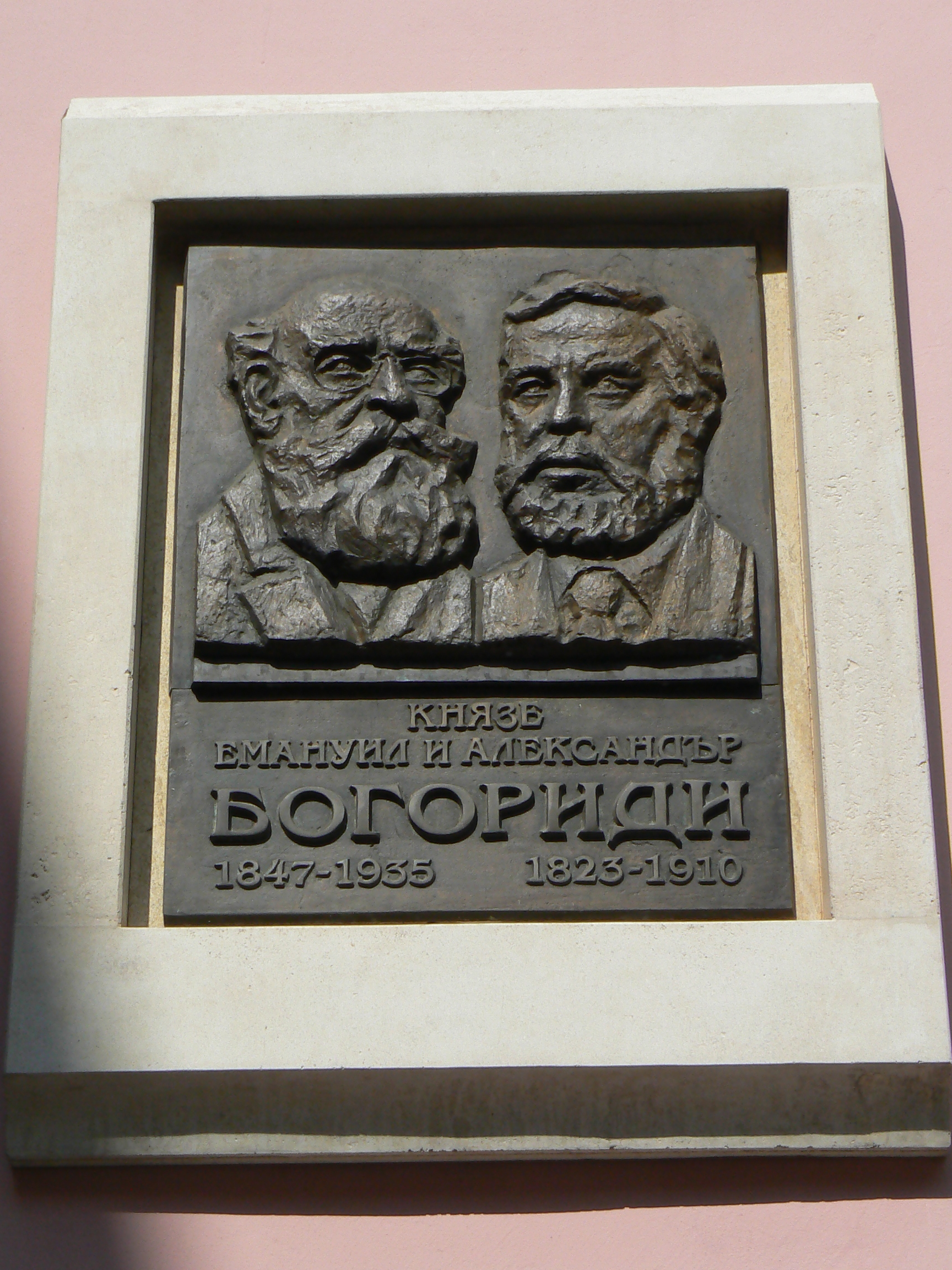
Memorial plaque to Emanoil and Alexander Vogoride in Burgas, Bulgaria

In 1876, Emanoil Vogoride-Conachi met with Bulgarian leaders Dragan Tsankov and Marko Balabanov, who were involved in diplomatic efforts toward the Great Powers aimed at improving the situation of Bulgarians within the Ottoman Empire.

The memoirist Dobri Ganchev describes him during a meeting in 1881 with Exarch Exarch Joseph I as an elegant aristocrat, fluent in French, and interested in the affairs of the Bulgarian Exarchate and the Macedonian question. On that occasion, Vogoride reportedly donated 75 Napoléon gold coins to Bulgarian schools in Macedonia.

== Final years and death ==
After his political failures in 1887, Emanoil Vogoride-Conachi withdrew permanently from public life, leading a luxurious but solitary existence in Western Europe. He died in 1935 in Paris, at the age of 88. With his death, the Vogoride-Conachi line effectively became extinct.
