= Sophronius of Vratsa =

Bulgarian cleric (1739–1813)

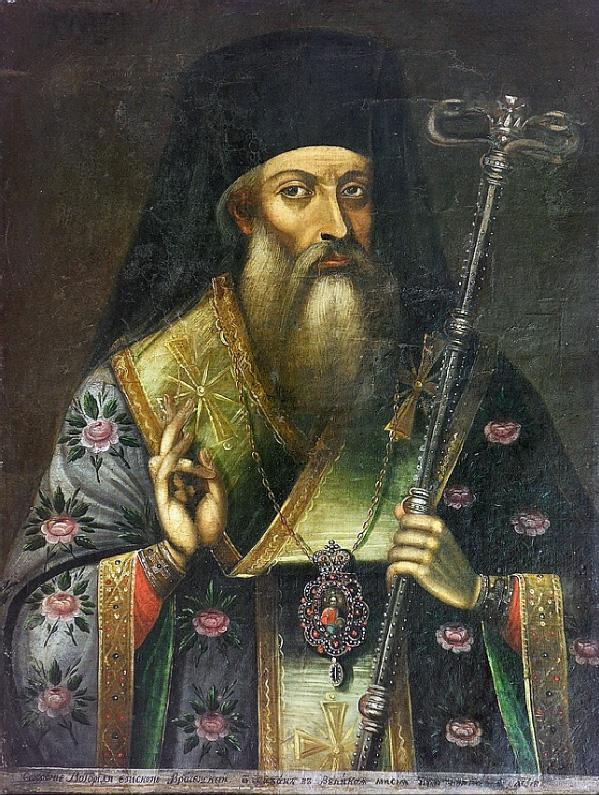
Sophronius of Vratsa

Saint Sophronius of Vratsa (or Sofroniy Vrachanski; Bulgarian: Софроний Врачански; 1739–1813), born Stoyko Vladislavov (Bulgarian: Стойко Владиславов), was a Bulgarian cleric and one of the leading figures of the early Bulgarian National Revival.

== Biography ==
Vladislavov was born in the town of Kotel in Eastern Bulgaria in 1739 to the family of a cattle trader. His father, Vladislav died in 1750 in Istanbul of the plague. When Stoiko was 3 years old his mother, Maria, died and his father remarried. He attended a monastery school in his home town and studied Slavic and Greek books. He worked as a frieze weaver, but had an interest in religion and became a cleric in 1762. While working as a teacher and writer he met Paisius of Hilendar in Kotel in 1765. Paisius showed him his Istoriya Slavyanobolgarskaya, the primary work of the Bulgarian Revival, of which Vladislavov made the first copy, known as Sophronius' Copy (Софрониев препис, Sofroniev prepis). Vladislavov travelled to Mount Athos between 1770 and 1775 and left Kotel in 1795. He served in the Karnobat parish and went to a monastery in Arbanasi in 1794, becoming Bishop of Vratsa under the name of Sophronius on 17 September. There he was engaged in social activity and initiated the sending of a political delegation of Vratsa residents to Moscow according to some sources. Sophronius had close ties with the Phanariote circles.

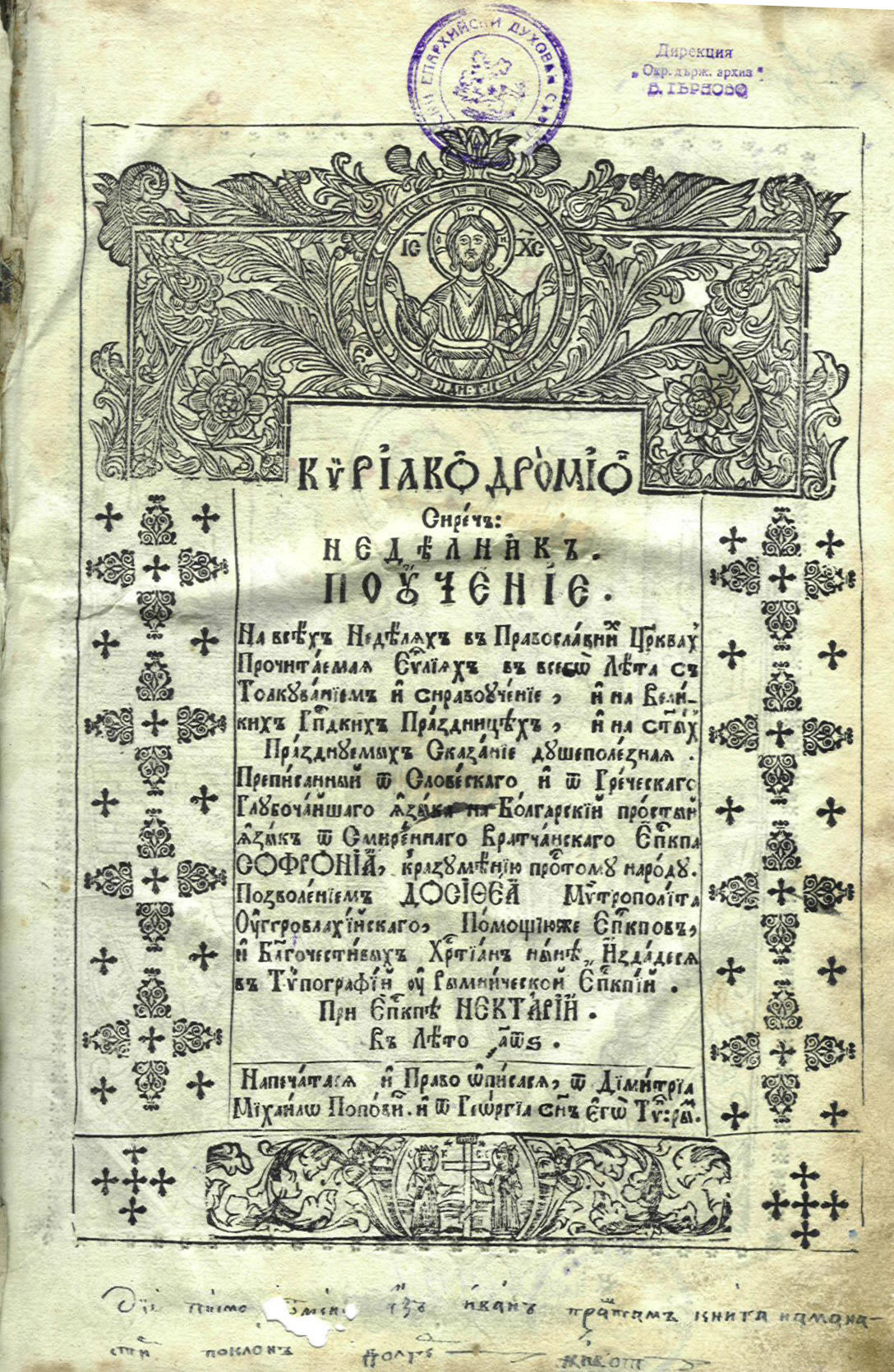
Cover of the book "Nedelnik"

After the dislocations caused by Osman Pazvantoğlu, the bishop's duties became more and more difficult for Vladislavov and he left Vratsa in 1797 to wander in Northwestern Bulgaria. He spent three years in Vidin in a period that helped him determine his goals as a writer. He left for Bucharest in 1803 to serve the people as a high-standing clergyman, being released on his insistence from his bishop's post but continuing to sign under his bishop's name.

Between 1806 and 1812 Sophronius of Vratsa was one of the most eminent representatives of the Bulgarian people in their communication with the Russian commanding of the Russo-Turkish War. He spent his last years in a monastery in Bucharest. His date of death is unknown, the last signed document being from 2 August 1813.

== Works ==
Sophronius wrote his best and most popular works in his Bucharest period. These include Nedelnik („Неделник“)—his only printed work—a collection of precepts and sermons for every holiday of the year based on Greek and Slavic sources. The collection had historical importance in initiating book printing in modern Bulgarian and establishing the Bulgarian vernacular as the language of literature. This big book includes also several woodcuts and ornaments making it an impressive object. He also wrote another collection, Sunday Evangelic Interpretation in 1805, as well as a very popular autobiography, Life and Sufferings of Sinful Sophronius („Житие и страдания грешнаго Софрония“, Zhitie i Stradaniya Greshnago Sofroniya) and an appeal to Bulgarian people, making him the most noted representative of the Bulgarian literature of the early 19th century.

== Legacy ==
Sophronius of Vratsa was canonized as a saint by the Bulgarian Orthodox Church on 31 December 1964.

St. Sofroniy Knoll on Snow Island in the South Shetland Islands, Antarctica is named after Sophronius of Vratsa.

== Descendants ==
Sophronius of Vratsa was married to Ganka. They had four children – Tsonko, Vladislav, Maria and Ganka. Through his son Tsonko Sophronius was ancestor of:

- Prince Stefan Bogoridi (1775/1780–1859) – a high ranking Ottoman statesman.
- Prince Alexander Bogoridi (1822–1910) – an Ottoman statesman and governor-general of Eastern Rumelia.
- Prince Nicolae Vogoride (1821–1868) – Ottoman-nominated Governor (kaymakam) of Moldavia;
- Prince Emanoil Vogoride-Conachi (1847–1935) – Romanian aristocrat and member of the Chamber of Deputies;
- Anna de Noailles (1876–1933) – French writer and poet;
