= Paul Păltănea =

Romanian historical researcher

- Born: June 25, 1924; Bucharest, Kingdom of Romania
- Died: January 25, 2008 (aged 83); Galați, Romania
- Occupation: historian
- Notable work: "The history of the city of Galați from its origins to 1918"
- Awards: A. D. Xenopol Award of the Romanian Academy

Paul Păltănea (born June 25, 1924, Bucharest – died January 25, 2008, Galați) was a Romanian historian. He was known as an outstanding researcher, author of scientific works, doctor in history, laureate of the Romanian Academy and member of the International Academy of Genealogy in Paris, the author of the monograph History of the city of Galați from its origins to 1918, a monumental work appreciated as one of the best monographs written in Romania.

== Biography ==
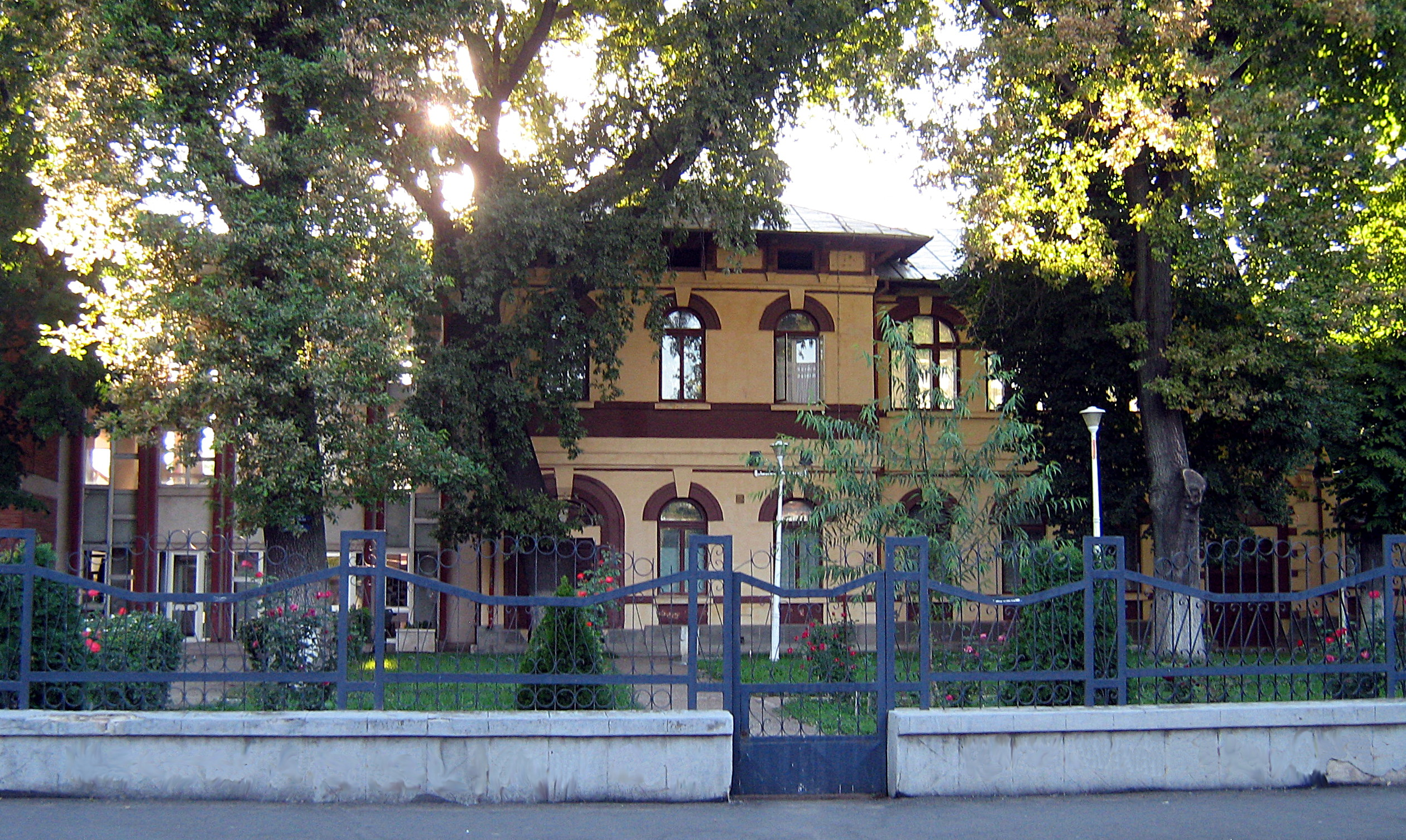
The former Vasile Alecsandri High School, actually the National College Vasile Alecsandri

Born in Bucharest, on June 25, 1924, Paul Păltănea spent his childhood in Galați, where his family, lacking too many material possibilities, had moved. He attended primary school here (1931–1935) and then the Vasile Alecsandri High School (1935–1943), where he learned, among so many other values and knowledge, respect for the past and love for his adopted city. In 1943, in the tumult of the Second World War in which Romania was also involved, he was admitted to the history specialization, Faculty of Letters and Philosophy of the University of Bucharest. He thus had the opportunity to listen to the courses of the great Romanian historians such as Gheorghe Brătianu, Constantin C. Giurescu or Ion Nestor. The hot period, preceding the Second World War, in which he attended university, influenced him whose education was in the spirit of "confidence in the Romanian nation, in its valences", causing him to take an active attitude, by participating in large-scale student demonstrations, such as the one in March 1944, in support of the efforts to regain Transylvania, in the anti-communist actions organized in the History Faculty by the National Peasants' Party, or in the tribute demonstrations of King Michael I in the Palace Square, on November 8, 1945, and May 10, 1946. These activities during the student period, together with the collaboration in the elaboration of some protest memos addressed to the Ministry of National Education, as well as a denunciation, in which he was catalogued as an Iron Guard sympathizer and a member of the Iuliu Maniu's National Peasants' Party, led to his inclusion in the false political membership of an Iron Guard member and consequently, at his first arrest, on May 17, 1948, being incarcerated in the Galați Penitentiary. He was released, after a 12-month extension of the "administrative sentence", on New Year's Eve 1953, after four years of ordeal. The friendships cultivated during the first period of detention became the reason for the second arrest, on April 17, 1959, followed on August 27, 1959, by the sentence to 18 years of hard labour and incarceration in the Galați Penitentiary. In September of the same year, he arrived at the prison in Aiud, where he remained for almost five years, until he was pardoned on July 27, 1964. Upon his release from Aiud, in 1964, he was assigned to the Galați History Museum. Spending about a decade in communist prisons (1948-1952 and 1958–1964) he met Valeriu Gafencu, Mircea Vulcănescu, Ernest Bernea, Radu Gyr, Petre Țuțea, Nichifor Crainic and many other important intellectuals, also victims of Stalinist policy.

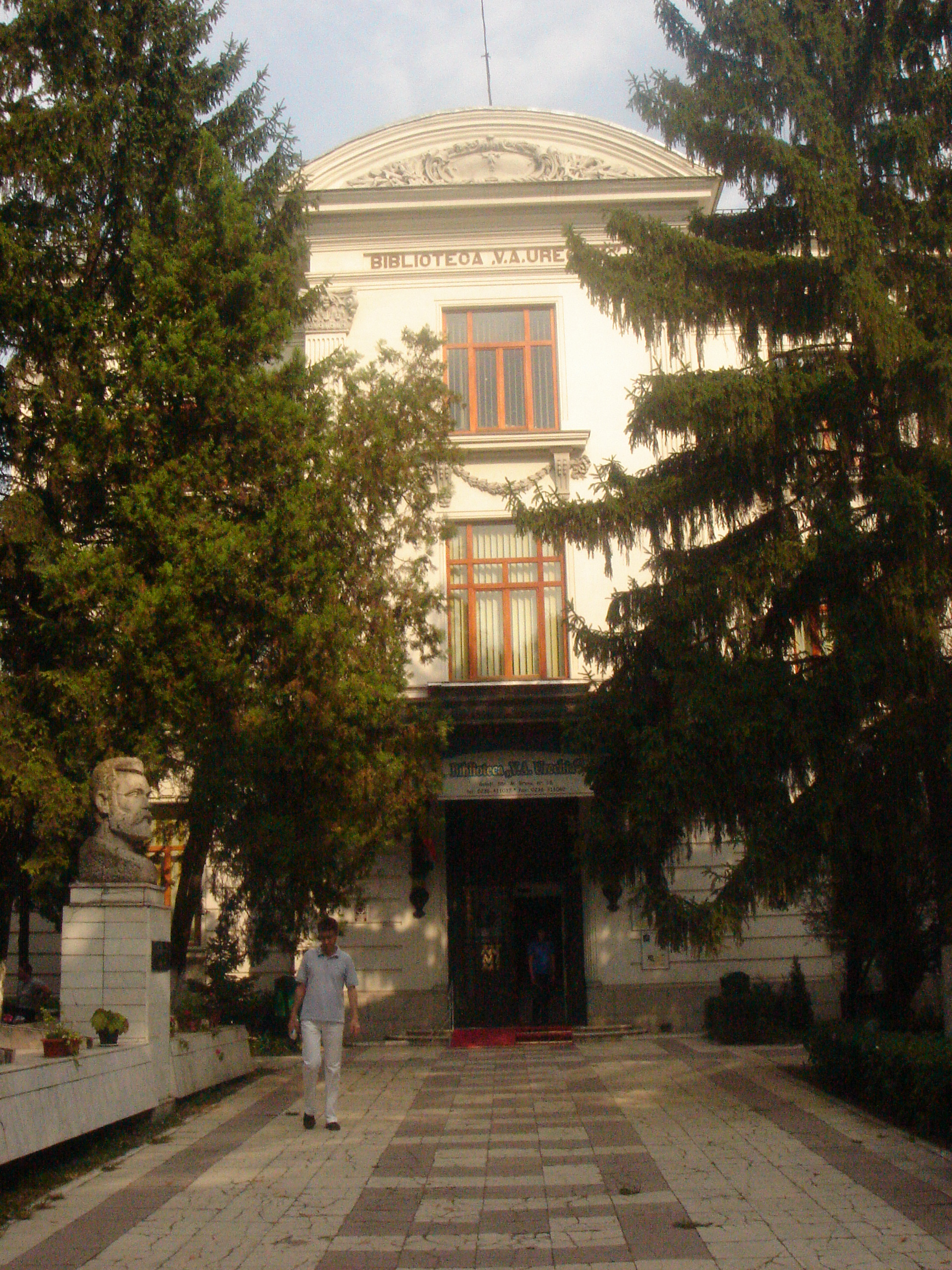
"V.A.Urechia" library in Galati

Paul Păltănea was a teacher, worker, clerk, museographer, and a librarian at the V.A. Urechia County Library. He had knowledge of history of buildings, streets, monuments, and he was often the one who got a young researcher out of an impasse, to whom he addressed, as a sign of respect, the appellation "colleague".

He was one of the founding members of the Sever Zotta Romanian Institute of Genealogy and Heraldry in Iasi, established in 1999. In recent years, Paul Păltănea was the president of the Galați branch of the Association of Former Political Detainees from Romania. He was conferred the title of honorary citizen of Galați municipality. Through a government decision from December 2014, the name of the Galați History Museum was changed to the Paul Păltănea History Museum.

=== Studies ===
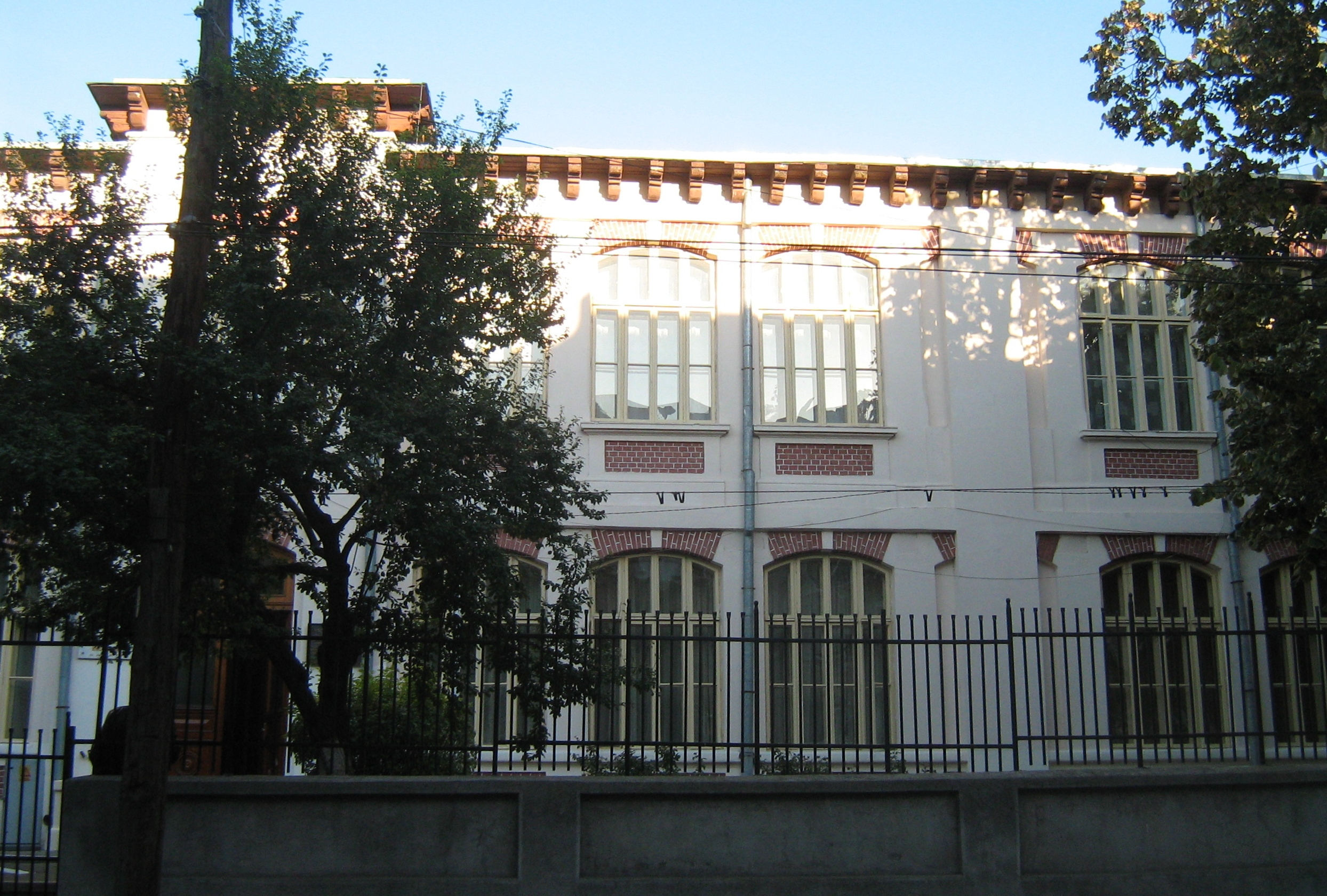
The former Boys' School no. 1, actually Secondary School no. 24 Saints Archangels Michael and Gabriel in Galați

- Boys' School no. 1, the current Secondary School no. 24 Saints Archangels Michael and Gabriel from Galați (1931–1935);
- Vasile Alecsandri High School in Galați (1935–1943);
- The Faculty of Letters and Philosophy of the University of Bucharest, History section, where he had as professors: Nicolae Bănescu (Byzantinology), Gheorghe I. Brătianu (Universal History), Constantin C. Giurescu (Romanian History), Ion Hudiță ^{(ro)} (History of Diplomacy), Ion Nestor (Prehistoric Archaeology), Victor Papacostea (History of the Balkan Peoples with special regard to Romanians from the South of the Danube), Theofil Sauciuc-Săveanu ^{(ro)} (Ancient History), Ion D. Ștefănescu ^{(ro)} (History of the Arts) (1943–1947);
- took the State Exam in the 1957 session.

=== Scientific titles ===
- Doctor in history at the University of Bucharest, with the thesis "History of the city of Galați from the earliest times to 1918" (21 Dec 1973), his title being recognized much later (7 Jan 1992).

=== Socio-professional activity ===
- during the student period he collaborated in the preparation of protest memos addressed to the Ministry of National Education and took care (together with Vladimir Diculescu) of the organization and activity of the Students' Society for Historical Studies at the Faculty of History in Bucharest (1945);
- he was one of the students who helped the historian and archaeologist Grigore Florescu ^{(ro)}, a professor at the University of Bucharest, to continue the work of Vasile Pârvan on the archaeological research of the ruins of Capidava (1945);
- substitute history teacher at the Unique High School in Barcea commune, Galați county (Dec. 1947 - May 1948);
- he was arrested by the secret police in Galați and imprisoned, without receiving a legal conviction (May 17 - Sept. 13, 1948);
- he was administrative sentenced to two years in prison, executed in the prisons of Aiud (from Sept. 15, 1948) and Ocnele Mari (from Dec. 15, 1948);
- his sentence was extended, through a new administrative sentence of two years, executed in the forced labor camp at "Capul Midia" (Canalul Poarta Albă-Midia Năvodari^{(ro)}), in the "punished" brigades (Dec. 12, 1950 - Dec. 30, 1952);
- after liberation, he was not accepted into education, being employed as an unqualified worker at the "Higiena" craft cooperative and then transferred to the "Reconstruction" cooperative from Galati (1953–1957);
- teacher at the General School in Văcăreni commune, Tulcea county (1957- Apr. 1959);
- arrested again, in April 1959, under the charge of "undermining the democratic regime", he was detained at the Galați Penitentiary and sentenced on August 29 to 18 years of hard labor and 8 years of civic degradation (Apr. 17 - Sept. 25 1959);
- imprisoned by the communist authorities in Aiud Prison, he was released 5 years later (Sept. 1959 - July 29, 1964);
- employed as a restorer (from Apr. 1965), then as a museographer (from Jan. 1966) at the County Museum of History in Galați (1965–1974);
- employed as the main librarian at the Library "V.A. Urechia" in Galați (Mar. 1974 - Apr. 1, 1990);
- he participated with scientific papers at symposia and national conferences;
- he organized book exhibitions, among which: "Galați in foreign literary works" (in collaboration with Sorina Codreanu, 1972); "European cities in the engraving of the 16th-19th centuries" (in collaboration with Veluța Făgurel, 1983); "The union of all Romanians" (in collaboration with Nedelcu Oprea, 1983);
- member of the editorial board of Porto-Franco magazine in Galați;
- he taught history at the Faculty of History in Cahul, Republic of Moldova.

=== Affiliation ===
- member and president of the Society of Students for Historical Studies (1947);
- member of the Galați student group of the National Liberal Party (1945);
- founding member of the "Collegium Vasile Alecsandri" Foundation (1992);
- founding member and member of the Scientific Council of the Romanian Institute of Genealogy and Heraldry "Sever Zotta" in Iași (1999);
- member of the Society of Historical Sciences from Romania;
- member of the International Academy of Genealogy in Paris (2007);
- member and president (2003–2005) of the Galați branch of the Association of Former Political Detainees.

=== Works ===
- Mihail Voievod - domn al Țării Românești, al Ardealului și a toată țara Moldovei, Galați, 1975
- Viața lui Costache Negri, Iași, 1985
- Istoria orașului Galați de la origini până la 1918, Porto-Franco Publishing House, Galați, 1994 - work awarded with the A. D. Xenopol prize of the Romanian Academy
- Neamul logofătului Costache Conachi, Albatros Publishing House, Bucharest, 2001
- Peceți ștefăniene la Dunărea de Jos, Galați, 2004

=== Awards ===
- The "Costache Negri" Award from the Pro-Bessarabia and Bucovina Association for outstanding research into the life and work of Costache Negri (1992);
- The "A.D. Xenopol" Award of the Romanian Academy for the work "History of the city of Galați from its origins to 1918" (1994);
- The "Ion I. Nistor" Award, from the Cultural Foundation "Magazin Istoric" (1996);
- The award of the Dunărea de Jos magazine, for the contribution brought, in 2005, to the history of Galați county (2006);
- Order "St. Andrew the Apostle", awarded by P.S. Casian Crăciun, Archbishop of Lower Danube (2006);
- Award of Excellence for the activity carried out in 2006 as an "explorer of the Time Tunnel in search of lost villages", from the Dunărea de Jos magazine (2007).

=== Publications articles ===
- Acțiunea,
- Acta Musei Napocensis,
- Actualitatea pe Dunăre,
- Almanahul revistei „Dunărea de Jos”,
- Antares,
- Anuar: [Episcopia Dunării de Jos],
- Anuar de lingvistică și istorie literară. Seria A,
- Anuarul Institutului de Istorie și Arheologie „A.D. Xenopol” Iași,
- Anuarul Institutului de Istorie Națională Cluj,
- Arheologia Moldovei,
- Ateneu,
- Biblioteca, Biserică, misiune, slujire,
- Buletin cultural,
- Buletinul Camerei de Comerț și Industrie Galați,
- Buletinul Fundației Urechia,
- Buletinul monumentelor istorice,
- Caietele Bălcescu,
- Carpica,
- Călăuză ortodoxă,
- Cercetări istorice,
- Cronica,
- Dacia literară,
- Danubius,
- Dominus,
- Dunărea,
- Dunărea de Jos,
- Evenimentul gălățean,
- Foi pentru minte și suflet,
- Galați Post,
- Îndrumătorul cultural,
- Limba română,
- Literatură și artă,
- Magazin istoric,
- Manuscriptum,
- Moldova suverană,
- Opinia,
- Pagini dunărene,
- Partener,
- PortoFranco,
- Revista bibliotecilor,
- Revista de istorie,
- Revista de istorie și teorie literară,
- Revista istorică,
- Revista muzeelor,
- România literară,
- Studia et acta Musei Nicolae Bălcescu,
- Studii și articole de istorie,
- Studii și cercetări de istoria artei. Seria Teatru, muzică, cinematografie,
- 7 Zile,
- Școala gălățeană,
- Viața liberă,
- Viața nouă.

=== Critical reviews ===
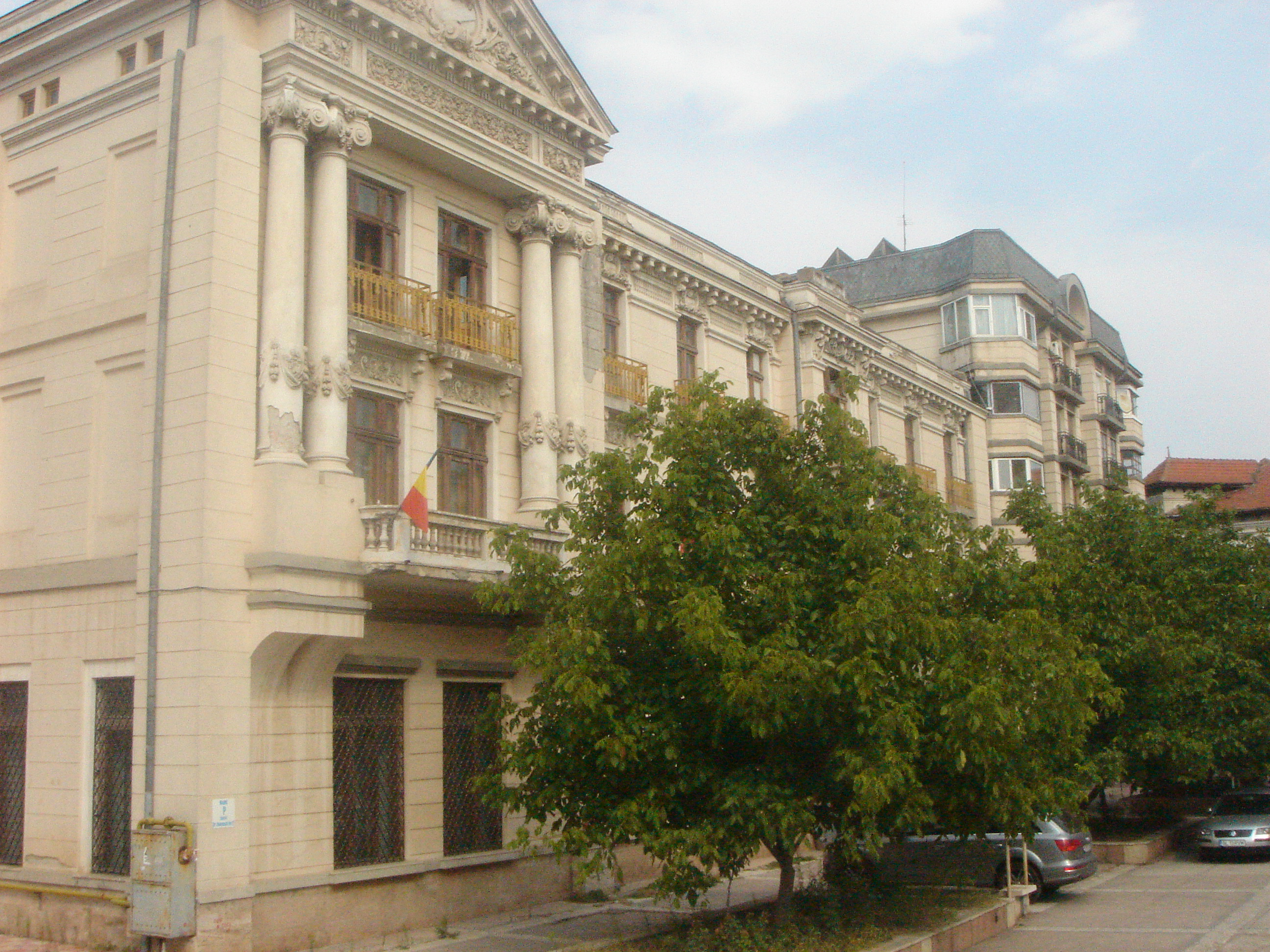
The History Museum "Paul Păltănea" in Galați

"Paul Păltănea, son of his city - Galați, engaged in an action whose risks we fully know, succeeded in adding to the Danube port an edifice commensurate with its importance and contemporary development. He has built his construction on documentary information that is meant to be - and apparently even is - exhaustive, to which he has added a rigorous scientific method and a mature research experience in the discipline that he serves with exemplary probity and passion." — academician Gheorghe Platon

"Paul Păltănea's work is a remarkable achievement. His style is clear and fluent; reading is done with pleasure." — academician Constantin C. Giurescu

"The long effort, the research talent, the very rich information and the unquenchable passion of Paul Păltănea found their materialization in a monumental monograph on one of the most important cities and ports of the country." — Constantin N. Velichi

== Bibliography ==
- Păltănea, Paul (2008). Istoria orașului Galați de la origini până la 1918 [The history of the city of Galați from its origins to 1918] (in Romanian). Galați: Editura Partener. ISBN 9789738871342. OCLC 952701385.
