= Kotel, Bulgaria =

Kotel Котел
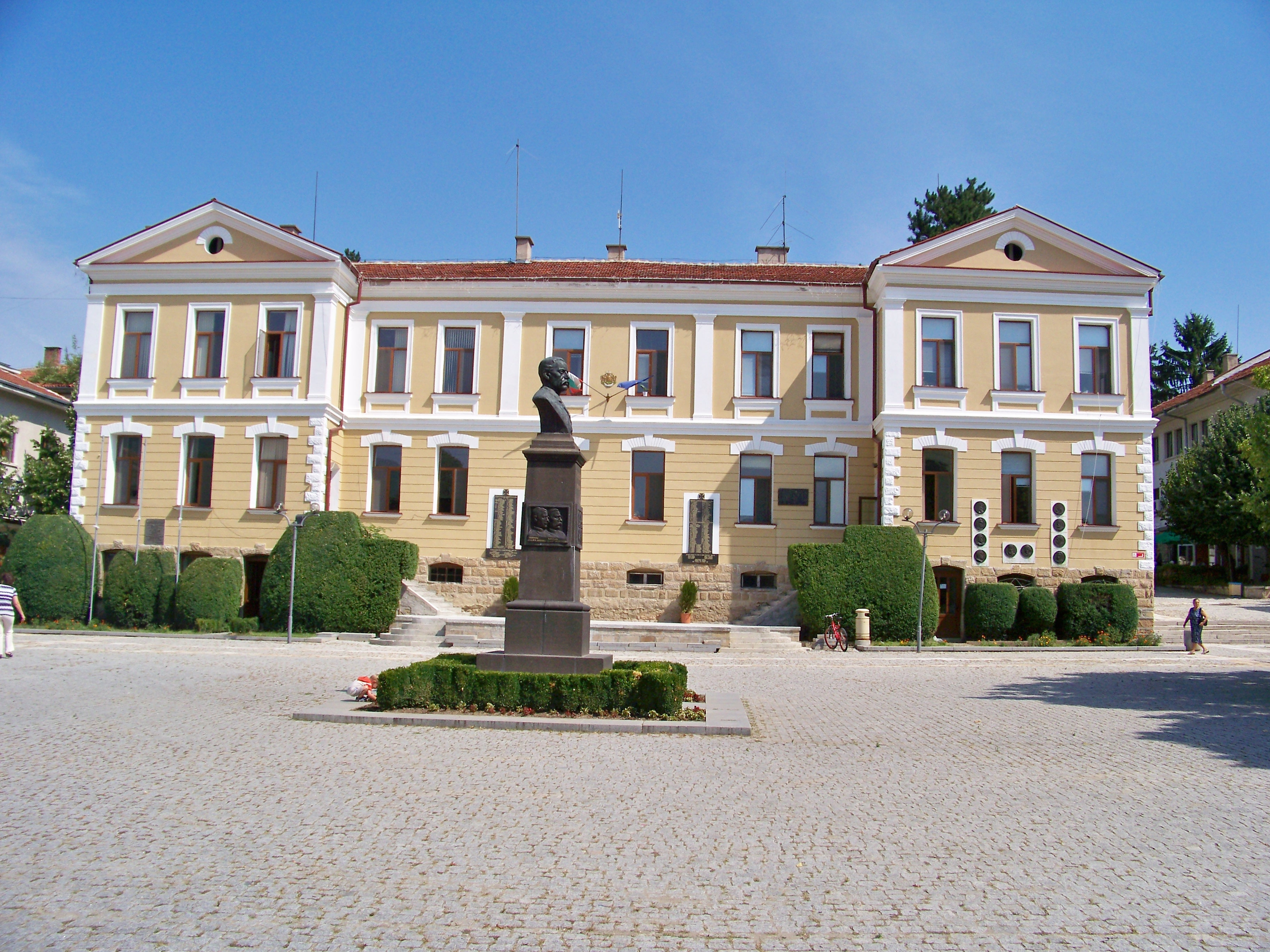

- Kotel, Bulgaria
- Coordinates: 42°53′12″N 26°26′58″E
- Country: Bulgaria
- Province (Oblast): Sliven

Government
  - Mayor: Kosta Karanashev
- Elevation: 643 m (2,110 ft)

Population (2016)
  - Total: 5 329
- Time zone: UTC+2 (EET)
  - Summer (DST): UTC+3 (EEST)
- Postal Code: 8970
- Area code: 0453
- License plate: CH

Kotel (Bulgarian: Котел [ˈkɔtɛɫ]) is a town in central Bulgaria, part of Sliven Province. It is the administrative centre of the homonymous Kotel Municipality. In 2016, the town had a population of 5,329.

Kotel is known for the numerous personalities of the Bulgarian National Revival who are connected to the town in various ways, such as the politicians Alexander Bogoridi and Stefan Bogoridi, the enlighteners Sophronius of Vratsa and Petar Beron, public figure Gavril Krastevich, revolutionary Georgi Rakovski, as well as the World War II prime minister Dobri Bozhilov. It has a well-known music school and a large Romani population who can be found playing in restaurants and orchestras all over Bulgaria. Because of its location in the mountains, Kotel is also a popular health resort for the cure of diseases such as tuberculosis. Kotel has been a centre for carpet making and there is a museum devoted to the craft.

== Geography ==
The town is located in eastern Stara Planina.

=== Landmarks ===
- Zlosten protected area
- Urushki skali protected area
- Eagle Caves protected area

== History ==
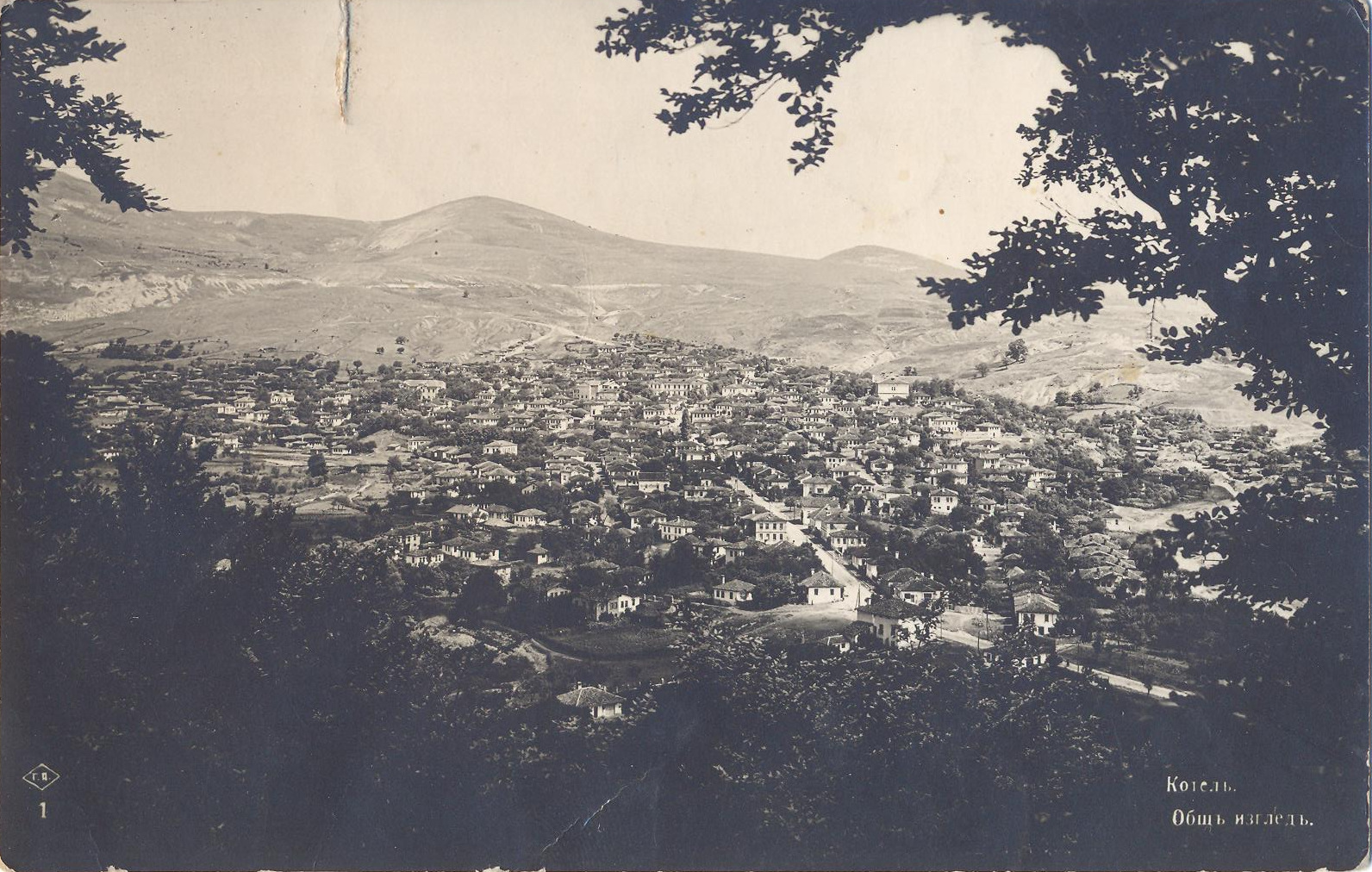
Kotel 1932

Kotel was settled during the beginning of the Ottoman occupation of Bulgaria, when people fled from neighboring cities and towns. The earliest information about the town is found in an Ottoman Turkish register from 1486. In 1894, much of Kotel was destroyed in a fire.

=== Honour ===
Kotel Gap on Livingston Island in the South Shetland Islands, Antarctica, is named after Kotel.

== Culture ==
=== Education ===
Kotel Literary School was established in the 16th century. Sophronius of Vratsa is a prominent representative of this school.

- Filip Kutev's National School for Folk Arts
- Georgi Rakovski high school

=== Saglasie-Napredak 1870 cultural center ===
The Saglasie-Napredak 1870 cultural center was founded in 1870.

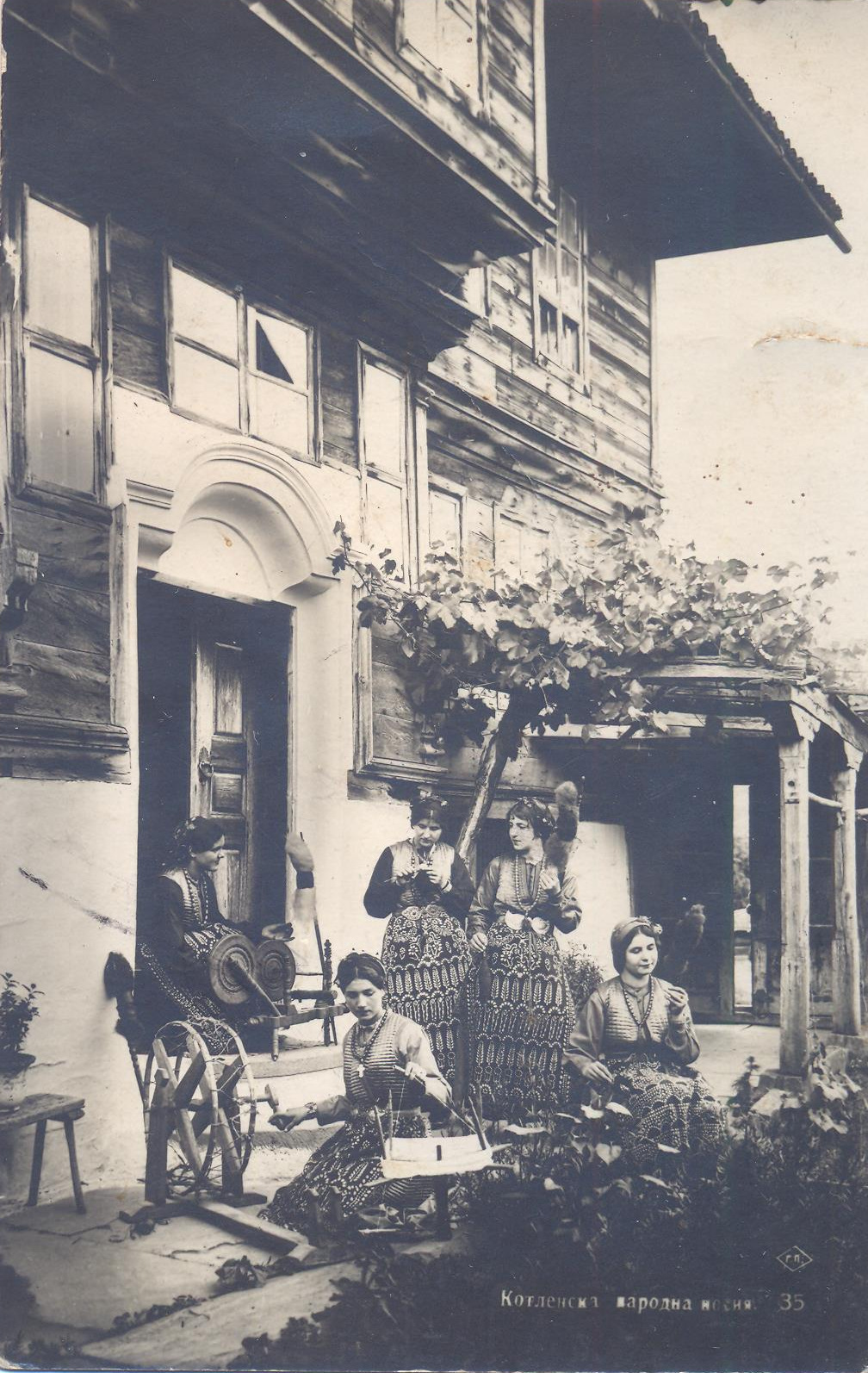
Post card from Kotel

== Agriculture ==
There is a strong sheep farming tradition in the region, which includes the practice of transhumance, migrating the sheep from lowland winter pastures to mountain summer pastures. This was profiled in a BBC Radio 4 documentary.

== Notable residents ==
- Georgi Sava Rakovski, revolutionary
- Petar Beron, scientist, philosopher and educator
- Gavril Krastevich, governor General of Eastern Rumelia
- Stefan Bogoridi, prince of Samos
- Sophronius of Vratsa, theologian, Bulgarian nationalist

== Gallery ==
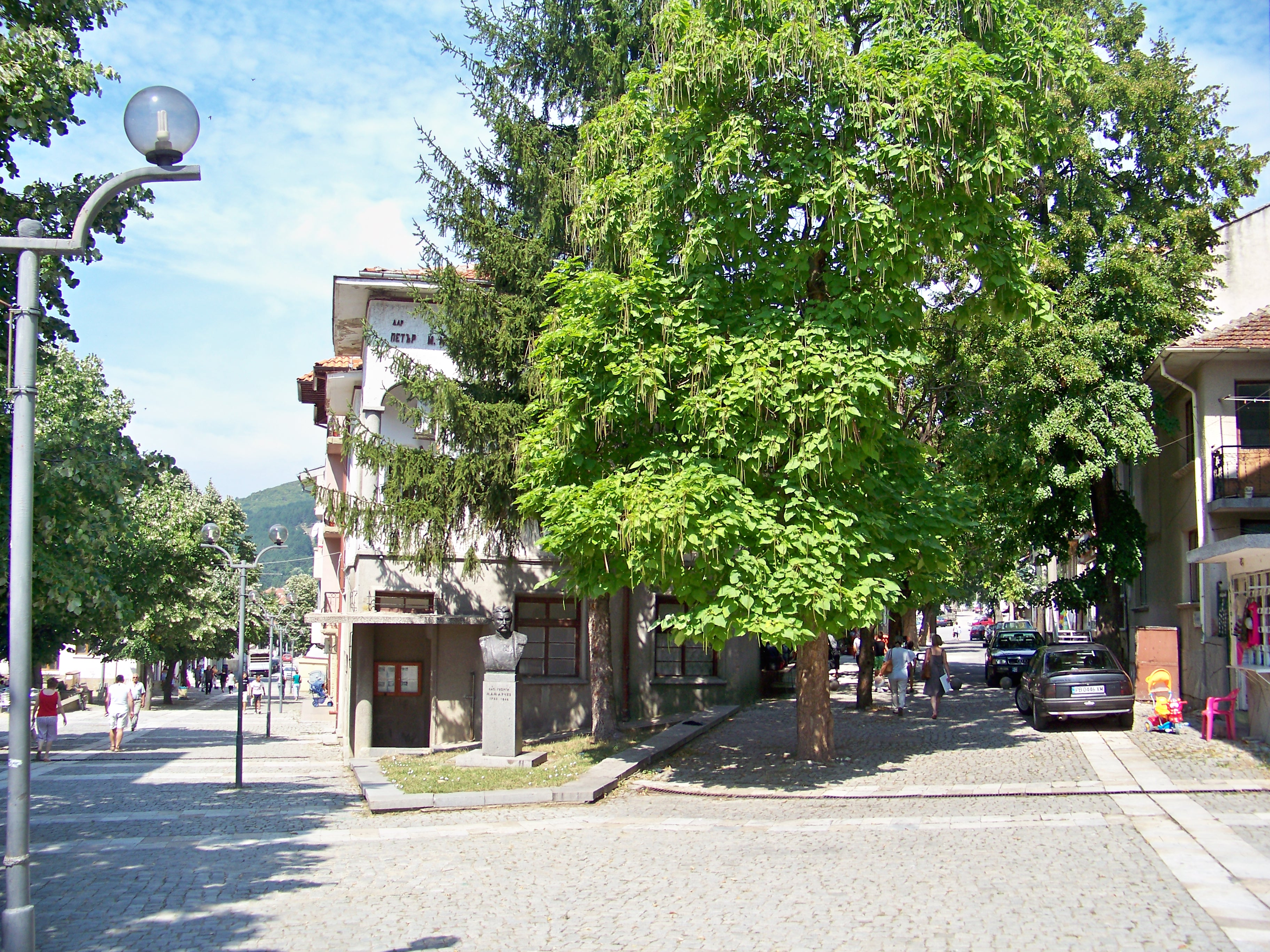

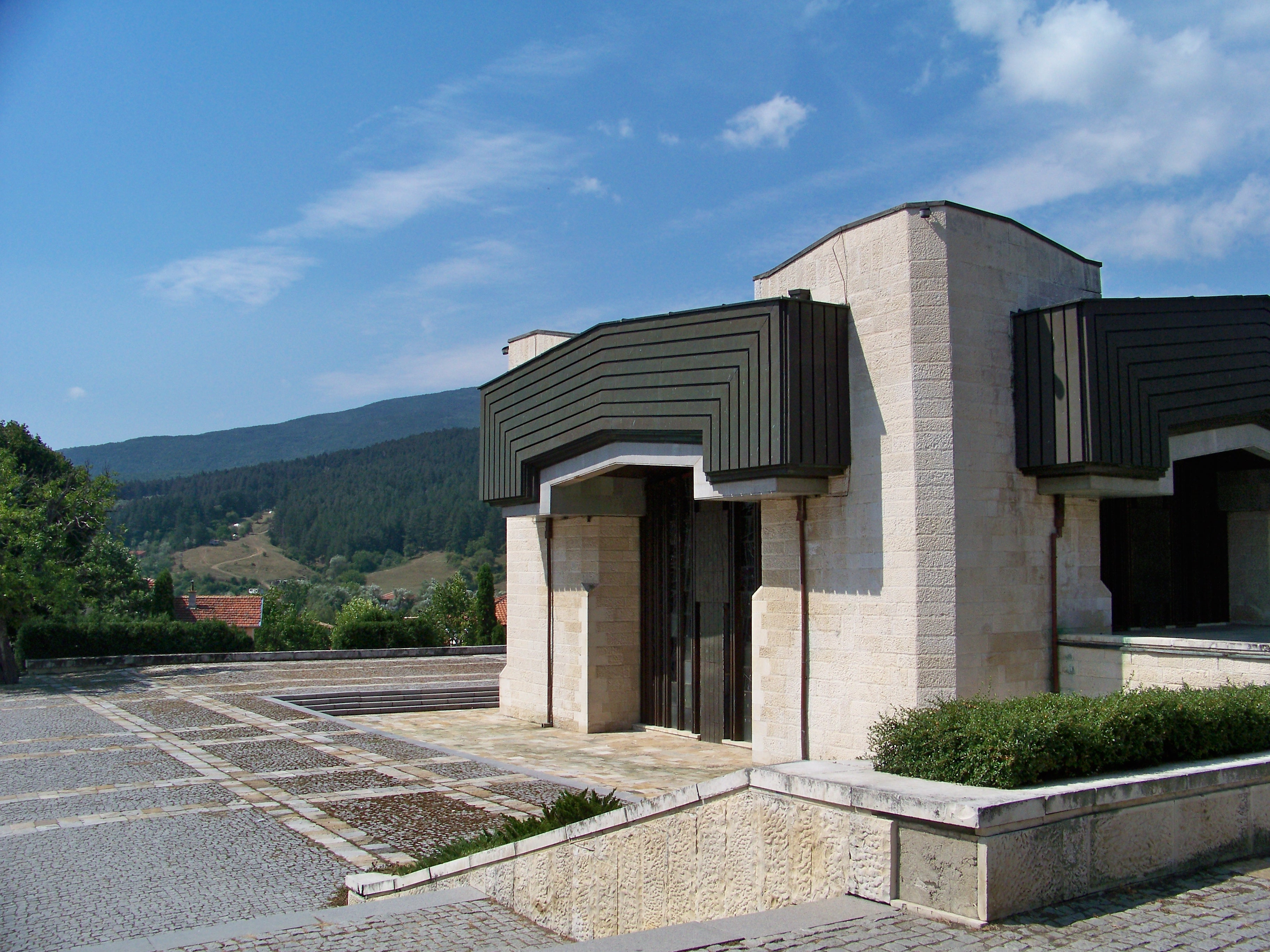

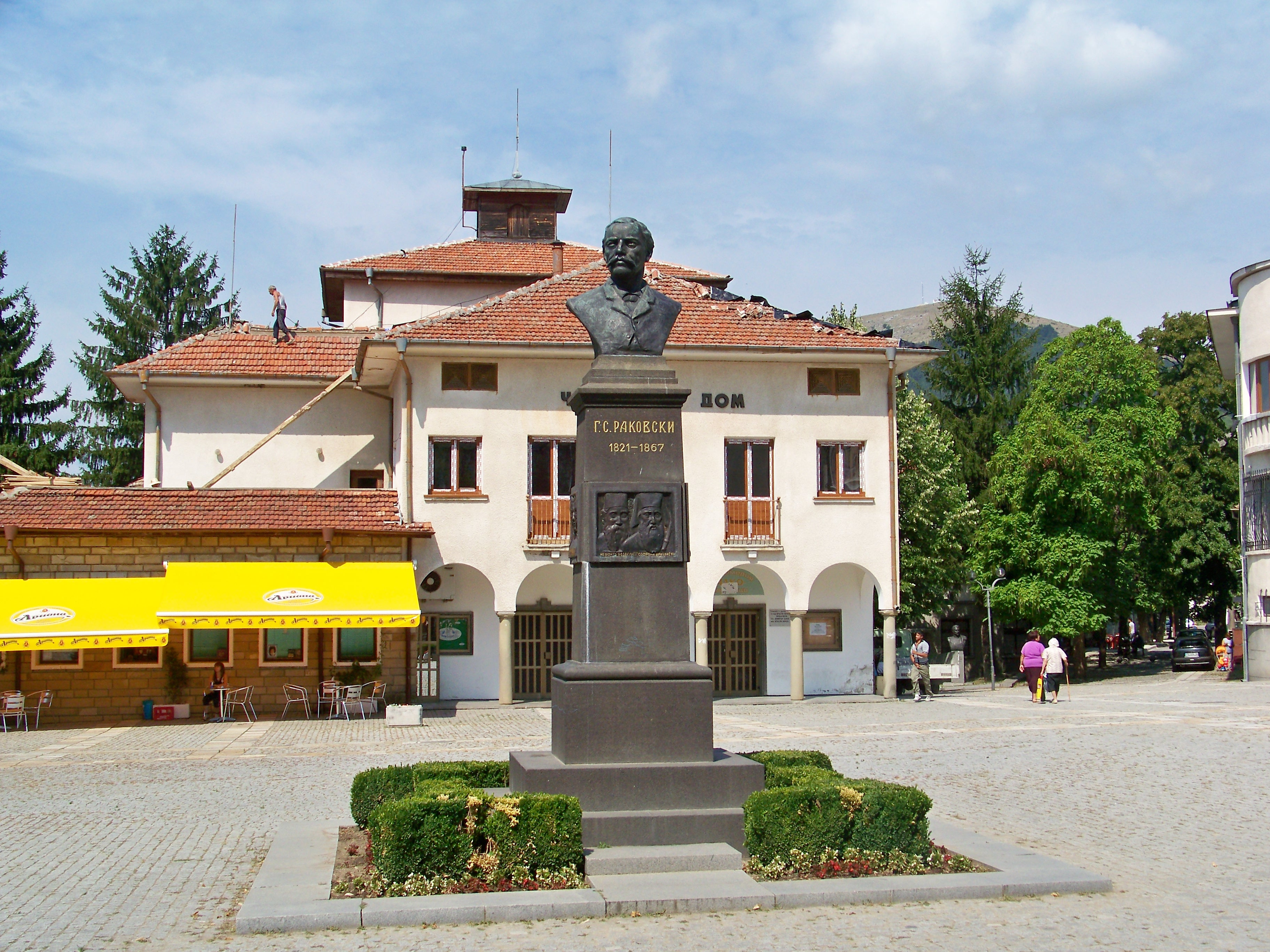

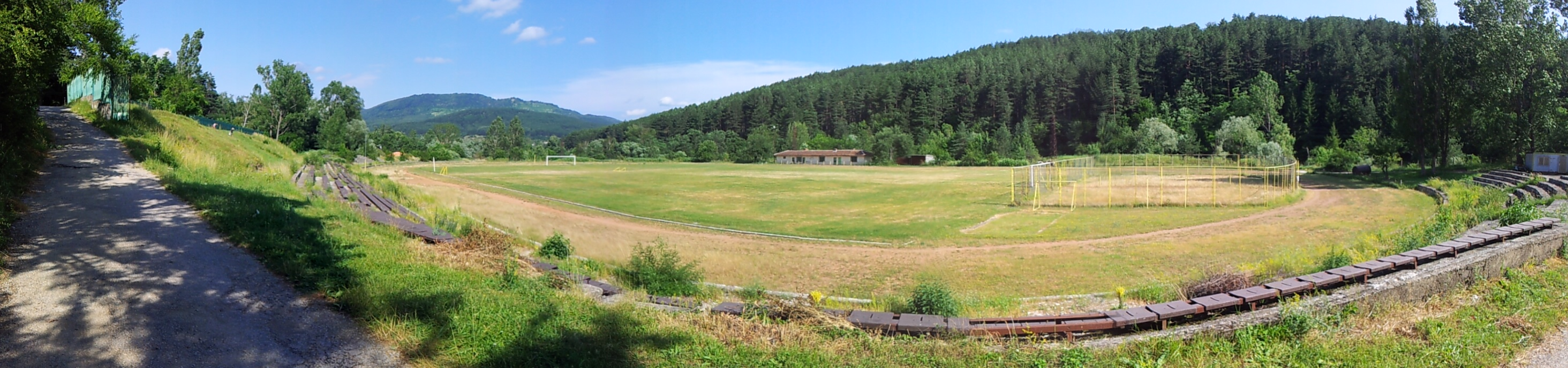

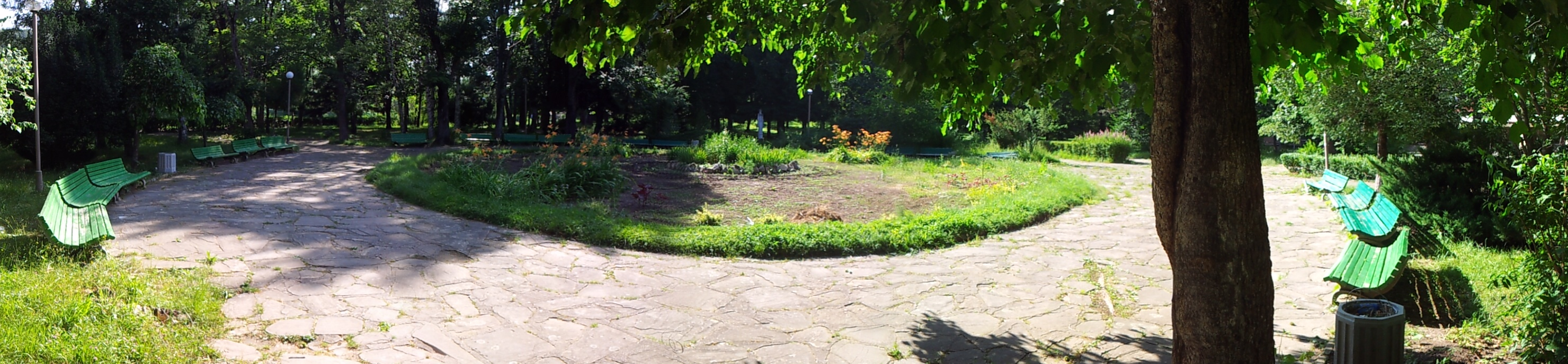
