= Filip Kutev's National School for Folk Arts =

Coordinates: 42.8934°N 26.4411°E

National School for Folklore Arts "Filip Kutev" is a Bulgarian school for folklore located in Kotel, Bulgaria.

== History ==
National School for Folklore Arts "Filip Kutev", named after famous Bulgarian composer Filip Kutev, was founded on 2 October 1967. Until 2004 the school was called Major Musical School "Filip Kutev". In the school there were vocal groups and choirs. The first classes were focused on Traditional Bulgarian Folklore and folklore from the other Bulgarian regions. The first director of the school is Vladimir Vladimirov.

== Graduates ==
- Teodosii Spasov - Bulgarian musician
- Dancho Radunov - Bulgarian musician
- Dimitar Lavchev - Bulgarian musician
- Binka Dobreva - Bulgarian singer
- Tanya Miteva Nedeva - Singer with Ensemble Filip Kutev
