= Cocuța Conachi =

Romanian princess and revolutionary (1829–1870)

Ecaterina Cocuța Conachi
- Princess Ecaterina Conachi
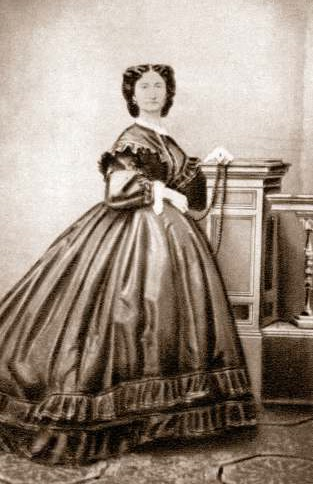
- Born: 2 April 1829; Țigănești, Galați County, Moldavia
- Died: 22 February 1870 (aged 40); Genoa, Italy
- Burial: Țigănești, Romania
- Spouse: Prince Nicolae Vogoride; Prince Emanuele Ruspoli
- Issue: Prince Emanoil Vogoride-Conachi; Prince Constantin Vogoride-Conachi; Princess Maria Vogoride-Conachi; Princess Lucia Vogoride-Conachi; Prince Costantino Ruspoli; Prince Eugenio Ruspoli; Prince Mario Ruspoli; Princess Caterina Ruspoli; Princess Margherita Ruspoli
- Father: Costache Conachi
- Mother: Smaranda Negri
- Religion: Eastern Orthodox, upon second marriage Roman Catholicism

Ecaterina Cocuța Conachi (2 April 1829 – 22 February 1870) was a Romanian princess and revolutionary. She is known for her activism and work for the unification of Moldavia and Wallachia.

She belonged to the Conachi family. Ecaterina Conachi married firstly in 1846, in Iași, Prince Nicolae Vogoride. They had four children. In 1864, she remarried in Rome, Prince Emanuele Ruspoli, with whom she had five children, among them Eugenio Ruspoli (6 January 1866, Țigănești – 4 December 1893, Somalia) and Mario Ruspoli (16 October 1867, Țigănești – 16 January 1963, Florence).

She died of paludism.
