= Gavril Krastevich =

Bulgarian politician and historian (1817–1898)

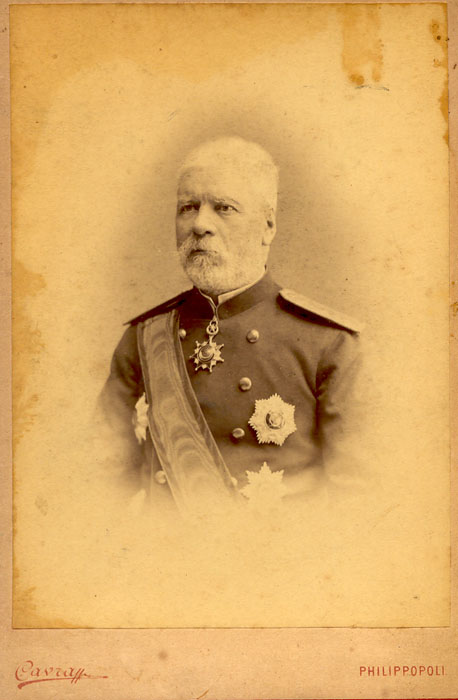

Governor General of Eastern Rumelia
- In office 16 May 1884 – 18 September 1885
- Preceded by: Alexander Bogoridi
- Succeeded by: Alexander I of Bulgaria

Personal details
- Born: 5 April 1817 Kotel, Ottoman Empire (now in Bulgaria)
- Died: 19 November 1898 (aged 81) Constantinople, Ottoman Empire (now Istanbul, Turkey)

Gavril Krastevich (Bulgarian: Гаврил Кръстевич; 5 April 1817 – 19 November 1898) was a Bulgarian politician and historian, and the first translator of Benjamin Franklin into Bulgarian. He was born in Kotel in 1817.

He was Governor General of Eastern Rumelia between 1884 and 1885 when it was part of the Ottoman Empire. Krastevich died in Istanbul on 16 November 1898.

Honorary member of the Bulgarian Academy of Sciences.
