= Țigănești =

Țigănești may refer to:

- Țigănești, Teleorman, a commune in Teleorman County, Romania
- Țigănești, a village administered by Topoloveni town, Argeș County, Romania
- Țigănești, a village in Vultureni Commune, Bacău County, Romania
- Țigănești, a village in Munteni Commune, Galați County, Romania
- Țigănești, a village in Ciolpani Commune, Ilfov County, Romania
- Țigăneștii de Beiuș, a village in Drăgănești Commune, Bihor County, Romania
- Țigăneștii de Criș, a village in Brusturi Commune, Bihor County, Romania
- Țigănești, Strășeni, a commune in Strășeni district, Moldova
