= Costache Conachi =

Romanian poet

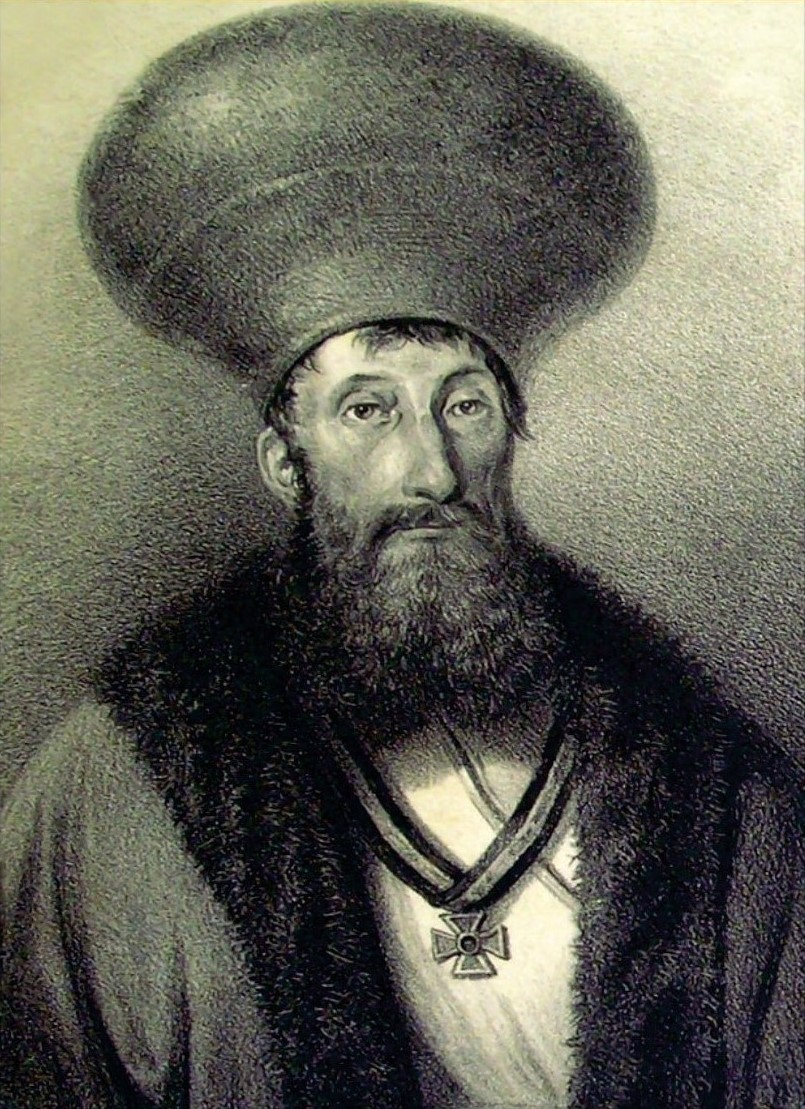
- Born: Alexandru Conachi; September 14, 1778^{Julian} September 25, 1778; Țigănești, Moldavia
- Died: February 4, 1849^{Julian} February 16, 1849 (aged 70); Țigănești, Moldavia
- Occupation: writer, boyar, politician
- Language: Romanian
- Genre: poetry
- Notable awards: Order of St. Vladimir 3rd class (Russian Empire)
- Spouse: Smaranda (Zulnia) Donici Negre (m. 1828; died 1831)
- Children: Ecaterina Cocuța Conachi
- Relatives: Conachi family

Costache Conachi (Romanian pronunciation: [kosˈtake koˈnaki]; b. September 14/25, 1778 – February 4/16, 1849) was a Romanian boyar, politician, poet and writer noted for emphasizing reason and improving the craft of Romanian writing.

== Biography ==
Born as a member of the Conachi family, he was an affluent boyar from Moldavia. If the Paharnicul Constantin Sion writes that the "Konaki family" is of Greek origin, "but for more than 160 years they came and have been related to many of the big [local] families", Paul Păltănea brought documents "which implies that the Conachi family descends from a family of "răzeși" (Note: Răzeși is the name given to free people, in the Middle Ages, in Moldavia^{[*]}^{[*]} Historical Romanian ranks and titles) from the village of Știoborăni, (Note: Știoborăni - a village in Solești commune in Vaslui County, Western Moldavia, Romania. It was a commune until the administrative reorganization of 1968) with documentary attestation from the time of Ștefăniță Vodă or even of Stephen the Great. The female line of the family is also of 'răzeși'."

As a child, Costache Conachi's education was the object of care. He studied Greek with a Greek archimandrite who lived in his father's house. A Turkish schoolmaster taught him his language and he learned French alongside a refugee revolutionary, Mr. Fleury. At the Princely Academy of Iași, he studied modern Greek, Slavonic, philosophy, mathematics and law. He had aptitude for the profession of engineer and his in-depth knowledge of Moldavian law led to his participation in the drafting of the Callimachi code (Note: The Callimachi (Calimach) Code [ro] was a civil code of Moldavia, created at the initiative of the ruler Scarlat Callimachi (Calimach), who promulgated it in 1817. This code is also called the Civil Code of Moldavia. When promulgated, the code was written in Greek. Its application became more consistent after 1833, when it was finalized, through translation, in the Romanian language. When compiling this code, it was aimed to combine local law, based on the custom of the land, with Byzantine law (Basilika and imperial legislation), while actually using, as main models, the French civil code from 1804 and the Austrian civil code from 1811.) which he had translated into Romanian when he became Logothete. Later, he was part of the commission in charge of drafting the "Regulamentul Organic".

Great boyar and great landowner, a contradictory figure at the time because he pleaded for the illumination of the people, he proposed a project to reform the education in Moldavia on the principle "The study must have a moral purpose".

All the data about Costache Conachi, corroborated with the testimonies of reliable foreign observers, highlight his culture, seriousness, tact and frugality - rare qualities in the corrupt and ignorant environment of the boyar oligarchy in the time of the phanariots. His sober existence contrasted too violently with the habits of his time and foreigners have understood this best. In the well-documented memoir he wrote in 1834, the French consular agent Bois le Comte (Note: Charles-Joseph-Edmond, Count de Bois-le-Comte (1796-1863) - French diplomat, ambassador to Spain (1824)^{[*]}^{[*]} List of ambassadors of France to Spain) depicts him as follows: „Under soft, caressing and shy forms, he hides instruction, a rather delicate spirit“. Another French consular agent is of the same opinion and praises the political prudence of the Grand Boyar. As for Saint-Marc Girardin, he discovered in Conachi „a figure such as I imagine those of the eighteenth century: something mocking and sardonic; but his sarcasm was directed against vice“.

Preoccupied with astronomy, he bought from Vienna all the instruments necessary to establish an observation tower, including a telescope, bequeathed to the Society of Physicians and Naturalists; as a "geometer and boundary marker" he established boundaries and drew up plans of the boyars' estates

In the literary field, Costache Conachi is regarded by many as the first true Romanian poet of his time. He is credited with infusing eroticism into Romanian poetry. Although he lived and worked in an era of Romanian literature that is hazy at best, his name is not easily forgotten.

Coming from a wealthy family, Conachi had access to readings on foreign cultures and the works of great authors. This foundation of knowledge shaped his poems. It resulted in verses in Romanian marked with unprecedented elements such as eroticism.

The great logothete Costache Conachi died on February 4, 1849, being buried next to his wife, in the Banu Church cemetery. Later, the remains of Costache Conachi and his wife were transported to Țigănești, near the church he had founded.

A book by Conachi

== Brief presentation ==
=== Studies ===
He studied under the guidance of foreign teachers while in the parental home. He studied French language and literature with Professor Fleury. He attended the courses of the Princely Academy of Iași where he learned French, German, Greek and Turkish (March - Dec. 1792).

=== Socio-professional activity ===
- he received the rank of Comis (Sept. 1802);
- he made a color map of the town of Piatra Neamţ (1804);
- he received the rank of Ispravnic of the Tecuci County (Aug. 1806-1812; 1815-1816);
- Staroste of Putna County (Nov. 1, 1809 – June 15, 1810);
- he received the rank of Aga of Iași (Nov. 18, 1813);
- he was "Vornic of the police" in Iași (1814-1818);
- he was part of the committee that drew up the "Callimachi Code" (1815-1816);
- he was appointed "Vornic of the community" in Iași (1816);
- "Vornic of the Aprods" (Note: Aprod - official in charge of justice or fiscal affairs, or introducing guest to the court^{[*]} ^{[*]} Historical Romanian ranks and titles) during the reign of Mihai Suţu (1819-1921);
- during the Wallachian uprising of 1821, he took refuge in Bessarabia, at his Sîngera estate (May 1821);
- he returned to the country (1823);
- Grand Postelnic (President of the Department of Foreign Affairs) (28 Dec. 1823 - 1827);
- member of the "Committee of Three" for the reorganization of finances (1824-1828);
- he translated Pierre d'Herbigny's Political View of all Europe from the year 1825 (1826);
- becomes a member of a masonic lodge in Iași (1828)
- member of the Finance Administration Committee, under Ioan Sturdza (1828-1831);
- he was appointed by the Public Divan of Moldavia to be part of the Drafting Commission of the Organic Regulation, where he introduced the chapters that set the conditions for the future union of the Romanian Principalities (June 17, 1829 - 1831);
- Great Logothete for Justice (Ministry of Justice) (1831-1833);
- initiated, together with Mihail Sturdza, the translation and printing of the Code of Laws by Scarlat Callimachi (1832);
- initiator of the extractive industry in Moldavia;
- he was a candidate for the Moldavian throne (April 1834);
- he retired from political life (1834);
- General epitrop of the House of Hospitals and Hospices "St. Spiridon" from Iași (Note: The General epitropy of the House of Saint Spiridon Hospitals was a non-profit organization that administered the "Saint Spiridon" Hospital in Iași as well as other hospitals in Moldavia from the mid-18th century until the health reform of 1948.) (1835);
- epitrop (Note: Epitrop - administrator of the wealth of a church) of the Banu Church in Iași;
- president of the Administration of the public settlements "St. Spiridon" from Iași (1840);
- conversant in Greek, French and Turkish, he translated some poems and philosophical writings from French into Romanian, among which is "Essai sur l'homme" by the poet and philosopher Alexander Pope.

=== Works ===
- Debut: literary, with a political ode - Moruz Voivod (Sept. 1802),
- he translated Essay on Man by Alexander Pope, but also various works from Voltaire, Ovid and the novel Mathilde by Mme Cottin,
- he translated poems by the French authors Jean-François Marmontel, Charles-Pierre Colardeau and Claude Joseph Dorat,
- he writes small comedies with allusions to contemporaries such as Judgment of women, Love and all graces, the first writings for puppet theater in Romanian literature,
- he also produced a treatise on versification: The Craft of Romanian Verses.

==== Poems ====
- Amoriul din prieteşug
- Asară, de-un vac trecut
- Ce este nurul
- Cu prietena-mpreună
- De-ai privi marea vr'odată
- Dorul
- Jaloba mea
- Mă sfârșesc, amar mă doare
- Nume
- Omule, slabă fiinţă...
- Răspunsul unei scrisori
- Săracelor tinerețe
- Scrisoare către Zulnia
- Visul amoriului
- Ziori de ziuă se revarsă

==== Posthumous collections ====
Poetry

- Alcătuiri și tălmăciri, edited by N. Ionescu, Iași, 1856
- Alcătuiri și tălmăciri, 2nd ed., edited by M. Pompiliu, foreword by Ecaterina Vogoride-Conachi, introduction Short events from the life and family of the Logothete Conachi by Em. Vogoride-Conachi, Iași, 1887;
- Poems, edited by I. Pillat, Bucharest, 1942;
- Selected writings, preface, glossary and bibliography by Ecaterina and Al. Teodorescu, Bucharest, 1963.

Translations

- Mme Cottin, Mathilde, I-III, translated by Costache Conachi, Iași, 1844.

== Awards ==
- Order of St. Vladimir 3rd class (Russian Empire) for the contribution to the drafting of the Regulamentul Organic (granted by the Russian general Pavel Kiseleff).

== See also ==
- Conachi family
- Cocuța Conachi
