= International Academy of Genealogy =

Academy promoting genealogical studies

International Academy of Genealogy is an international organization dedicated to genealogy, headquartered in Paris. It was created on 22 September 1998 during a constitutive meeting held in Turin, Italy. Founder of the Academy and initiator of the constitutive meeting is the French genealogist and heraldrist Jean-Marie Thiébaud.

== Purpose ==
The Academy was created to encourage, coordinate, promote and support the genealogic studies from all over the world. It also organizes international meetings in order to promote the genealogy as one of the important branches of the social studies in human history.

== International Colloquiums ==
The International Academy of Genealogy has organized fourteen International Colloquium since its foundations:

- XI Colloquium: Warsaw (Poland), 2-4 July 2019.
- XIV Colloquium: La Laguna (Tenerife), 25-28 June 2025.

== Members ==
Academy has full members, called academicians, whose number is limited to 100 and associate members, whose number is unlimited. The full members have the right to vote, but the associate members do not. However, the associate members may participate at all events and may express their opinions.

Notable academicians:

- Jaime de Salazar y Acha.
- Bruce Durie.
- Eduardo Pardo de Guevara.
