= Sever Zotta Romanian Institute of Genealogy and Heraldry =

Romanian research institute

The Sever Zotta Romanian Institute of Genealogy and Heraldry (Romanian: Institutul Român de Genealogie și Heraldică „Sever Zotta”) is a research institute located in Iași. The institute was established in 1999, being registered as a non-profit organization on January 14, 1999.

The founding members of the institute are:

- Gabriel Bădărău
- Constantin Bălăceanu-Stolnici
- Radu Beldiman
- Ioan Căprosu
- Dan Cernovodeanu
- Paul Cernovodeanu
- Daniel Ciobanu
- Mircea Ciubotaru
- Costin Clit
- Mihai Cojocaru
- Andi-Marius Daschevici
- Zoe Diaconescu
- Vasile Docea
- Maria Dogaru
- Ioan Drăgan
- Gheorghe I. Florescu
- Grigore Ghika
- Ștefan S. Gorovei
- Radu Sc. Greceanu
- Sergiu Groholschi-Miclescu
- Cătălin Hriban
- Sorin Gh. Iftimi
- Constantin Ittu
- Niculae Koslinski
- Marcel Lutic
- Jean Nicolas Mănescu
- Costin Merișca
- Zamfira Mihail
- Gheorghe Musat
- Petre S. Năsturel
- Ioan Niculita
- Catalina Opaschi
- Liviu Papuc
- Paul Paltanea
- Katiuşa Pârvan
- Gheorghe Platon
- Stefan Pleșia
- Ioan-Aurel Pop
- Rodica Popovici
- Flavius Solomon
- Maria Magdalena Székely
- George Felix Taşcă
- Răzvan Theodorescu
- Andrei Tukacs
- Mihai Răzvan Ungureanu
- Silviu Văcaru
- Petronel Zahariuc
