= Nicolae Vogoride =

Ruler of Moldavia from 1857 to 1858

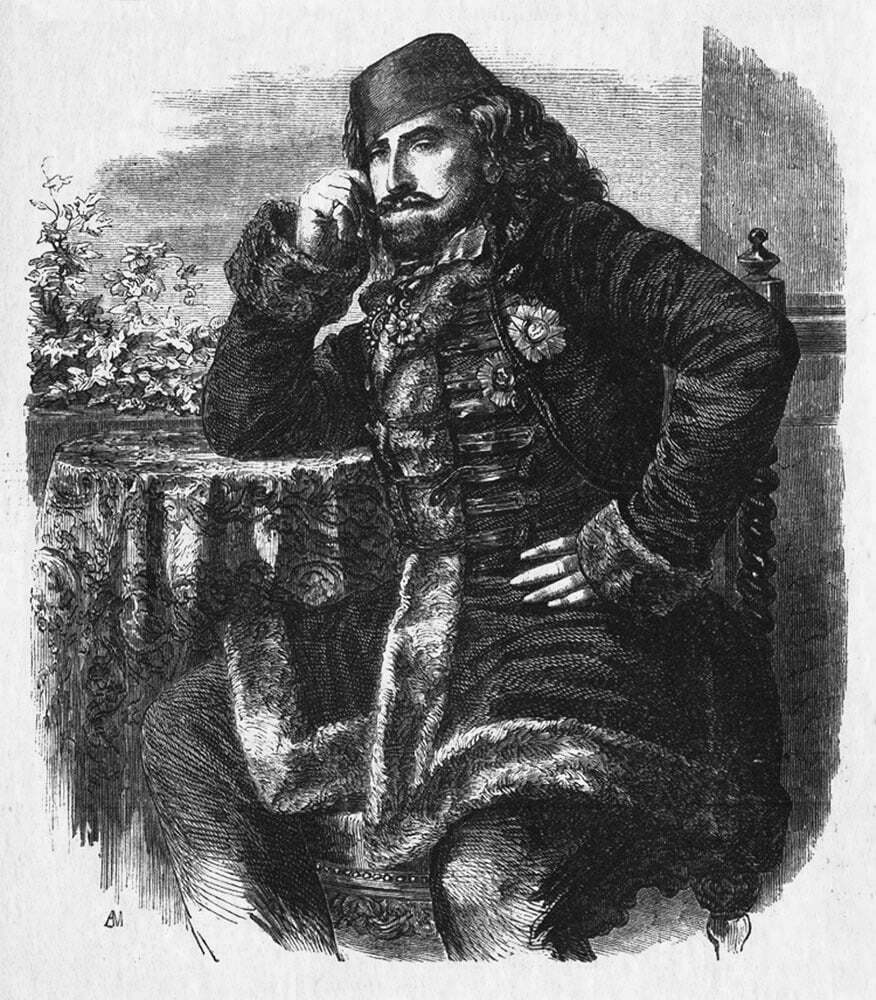
Vogoride circa, 1858

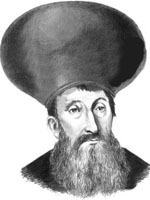
Great Chancellor Costache Conachi, father in law of Nicolae. His wife was Smaranda Negri-Donici.

Prince Nicolae Vogoride (Bulgarian: Никола or Николай Богориди, Nikola or Nikolay Bogoridi; Greek: Νικόλαος Βογορίδης, Nikolaos Vogoridis; Turkish: Nikolaki Bey; 1820 – 12 April 1863) was a caimacam (temporary replacement of Prince; from Turkish: kaymakam) who ruled Moldavia between 1857–1858, following the Crimean War.

== Biography ==
He was the son of Stefan Bogoridi, an Ottoman high official of Bulgarian ethnicity who also served as Moldavia's governor in 1820–1821, and brother of Alexander Bogoridi. His mother was Ralou Skilitzi.

In 1856, as Prince Grigore Alexandru Ghica was removed by the Treaty of Paris, although Moldavia remained technically under the suzerainty of the Ottoman Empire, Vogoride was appointed as finance minister under the new government of caimacam Teodor Balş. When Balş died on March 1, 1857, Vogoride replaced him. He showed himself to be an ultra-conservative, and was against the union of Moldavia with Wallachia, the other Danubian Principality — the union project was advanced by the Romanian liberals who had taken part in the 1848 Moldavian revolution and, returning from exile, were organizing themselves as Partida Naţională.

The Treaty of Paris also required elections for the Moldavian Assembly, to be supervised by the Ottoman ambassadors of the signing parties. When these were held on July 19 of that year, Vogoride rigged the election lists to ensure a conservative majority with a strong Ottoman bias. When Sultan Abdülmecid I, with the assurances of Imperial Austria, did not void the election, Moldavia's other overseers (French Empire, Imperial Russia, Prussia and the Kingdom of Sardinia) broke diplomatic relations with the Ottoman Empire on August 4; by August 9, a compromise had been reached, the first election was annulled, and a new one was held on September 22. Not unsurprisingly, the majority of those elected were in favor of the union of the two principalities.

Vogoride was removed from office in October 1858.

=== Personal life ===
Vogoride studied in the Greek Orthodox College in Constantinople and later married into the wealthy Conachi family (1846), and sometimes thereafter used the name Nicolae Conachi-Vogoride. His wife was Princess Ecaterina Conachi, and they had four children: Prince Emanoil, Prince Constantin, Princess Maria and Princess Lucia.

He died in Bucharest. His burial was in 1863 at Brăila. One year later, his wife Princess Ecaterina married Emanuele Ruspoli, 1st Prince of Poggio Suasa.

Preceded by Teodor Balş	Caimacam of Moldavia; 1857–1858	Succeeded by Ştefan Catargiu, Vasile Sturdza and Anastasie Panu
