= Conachi family =

Moldavian boyar family

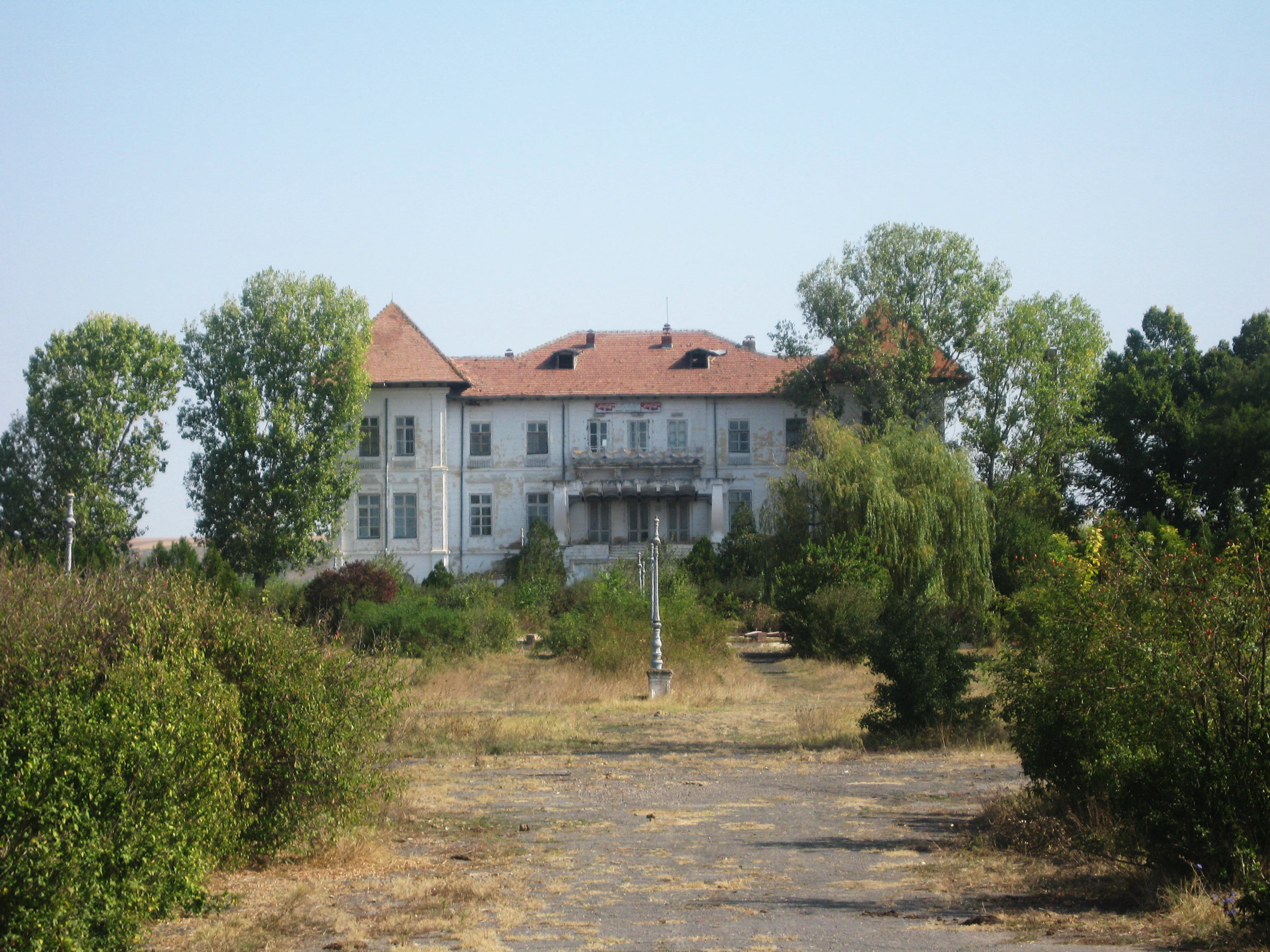
Castle of Costache Conachi

The Conachi family was a Moldavian boyar family, of Phanariote origin, or, according to others, of Moldavian high nobility (răzeș) origin.

== Notable members ==
- Costache Conachi, writer, poet, engineer, and politician (Great Logothete of Moldavia)
- Ecaterina Cocuța Conachi, activist and revolutionary
