= Stefan Bogoridi =

Prince of Samos from 1832 to 1850

- Стефан Богориди
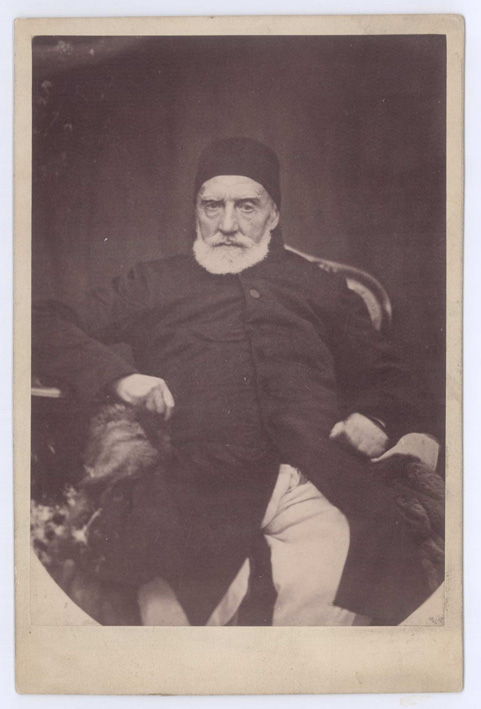

Prince of Samos
- In office 1832–1850
- Preceded by: Position created
- Succeeded by: Alexandros Kallimachis

Caimacam of Wallachia
- In office 1821–1821
- Preceded by: Alexandros Soutzos (as Prince of Wallachia)
- Succeeded by: Scarlat Callimachi (as Prince of Wallachia)

Caimacam of Moldavia
- In office 1821–1822
- Preceded by: Veniamin Costache (as Caimacam)
- Succeeded by: Ioan Sturdza (as Prince of Moldavia)

Personal details
- Born: 1775 or 1780 Kotel, Ottoman Empire (now Bulgaria)
- Died: January 8, 1859 Istanbul, Ottoman Empire (now Turkey)
- Spouse: Ralou Skilitzi
- Relations: Sophronius of Vratsa (grandfather)
- Children: Nicolae; Alexander
- Parent(s): Tsonko Stoykov; Gana Stoykova
- Education: Princely Academy of Bucharest
- Profession: Statesman

Prince (Knyaz or Bey) Stefan Bogoridi (born Стойко Цонков Стойков, Stoyko Tsonkov Stoykov; Bulgarian: Kняз Стефан Богориди; Greek: Στέφανος Βογορίδης; Romanian: Ștefan Vogoride; Turkish: Stefanaki Bey; 1775 or 1780 – 1 August 1859) was a high-ranking Ottoman statesman of Bulgarian origin, grandson of Sophronius of Vratsa and father of Alexander Bogoridi and Nicolae Vogoride. Stefan and his brother Athanase were named Bogoridi after Boris I, the first Christian ruler of Bulgaria (who was also known under the name Bogoris). Their parents were Ioan Vogoridi and Ana N.

== Biography ==
Born in Kotel, Bogoridi studied in the Greek language Princely Academy in Bucharest, Wallachia, where he changed his Bulgarian name Stoyko for the Greek Stefan. After finishing his studies, Bogoridi joined the Ottoman fleet as Dragoman and, under the command of Seid Mustafa Pasha (future Sultan Mustafa IV), took part in the Second Battle of Abukir against Napoleon Bonaparte in Egypt, making a miraculous escape after the defeat of the Ottoman forces.

In 1812, Stefan Bogoridi went to Moldavia with Prince Scarlat Callimachi, who appointed him governor of Galați (1812–1819). In 1821, during the local uprising of Tudor Vladimirescu and the invasion of Filiki Eteria as part of the Greek War of Independence, Bogoridi was nominal Caimacam of Wallachia; the following year, after the sweeping Ottoman offensive against Alexander Ypsilantis, he held the actual position of Caimacam in Moldavia 1822, and then returned as Dragoman of the Ottoman fleet. Between 1825 and 1828, he was exiled in Anatolia.

After the Russo-Turkish War of 1828–1829 and the Treaty of Adrianople, he was an advisor of Mahmud II, who gave him the title of prince (bey, ηγεμόνας) and appointed him governor of the island of Samos. He visited Samos only once in 1839 and ruled the island from Istanbul. Bogoridi, who renamed the capital of the island Stefanopolis after himself, was hated by the local Greek population due to his arbitrary rule. The Samians revolted against him in 1849 and had the Sultan dismiss him in 1850.

Under Abdülmecid I, Bogoridi was a member of the Tanzimat Council and an imperial counsellor. He obtained permission from Abdülmecid for building a Bulgarian Orthodox church in Istanbul, and donated his house in Fener (1849). On that spot, the famous Bulgarian Iron church was later erected, and named Saint Stephen in memory of him. He died in Istanbul.

== Sources ==
- Philliou, Christine M. (2011). Biography of an Empire: Governing Ottomans in an Age of Revolution. Berkeley, Los Angeles and London: University of California Press. ISBN 978-0-520-26633-9.

Preceded by Alexander Ypsilantis	Caimacam of Moldavia; 1821–1822	Succeeded by Ioan Sturdza
