= Munteni =

- Commune
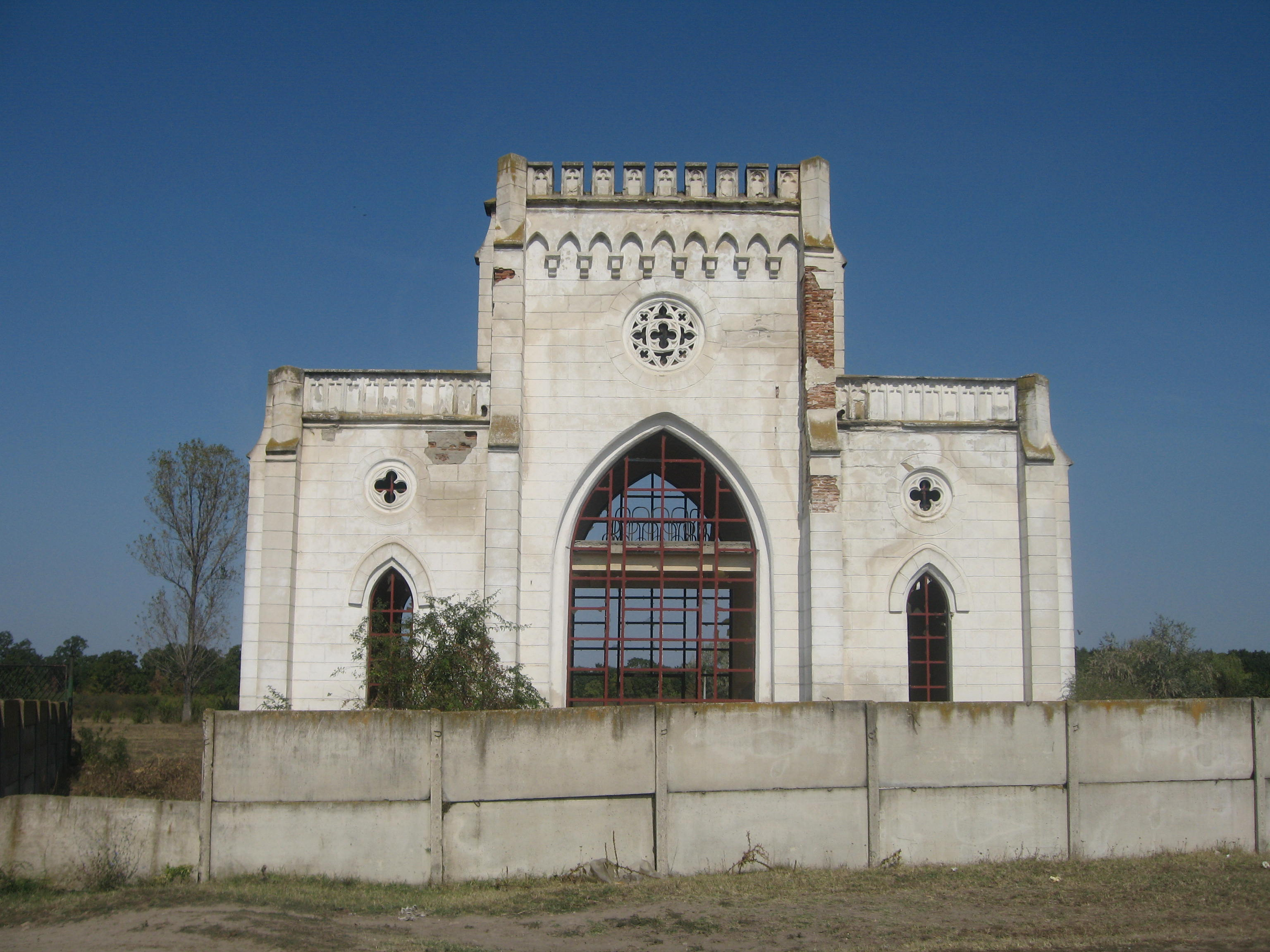
- Gate of the Costache Conachi manor in Țigănești

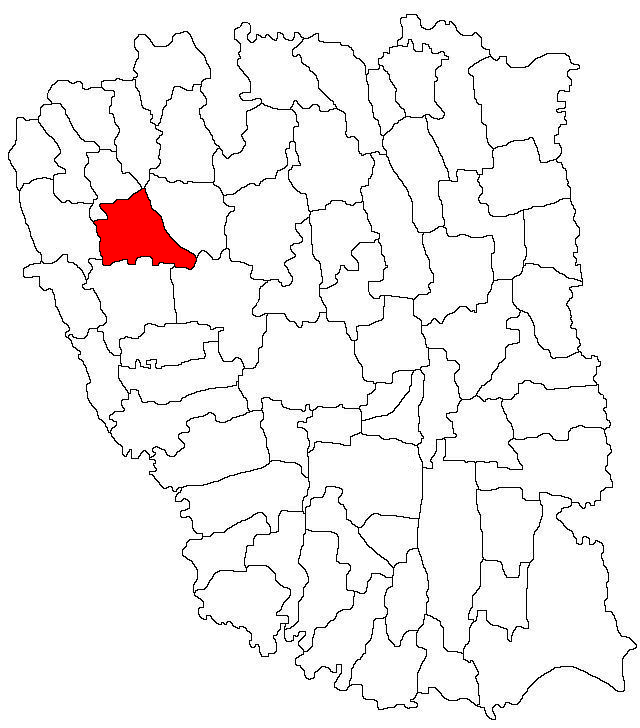
- Location in Galați County

- Location in Romania
- Coordinates: 45°51′24″N 27°32′11″E
- Country: Romania
- County: Galați

Government
  - Mayor (2020–2024): Dănuț Oprea (PSD)
- Area: 109.78 km^{2} (42.39 sq mi)
- Elevation: 41 m (135 ft)
- Population (2021-12-01): 7,067
  - Density: 64.37/km^{2} (166.7/sq mi)
- Time zone: UTC+02:00 (EET)
  - Summer (DST): UTC+03:00 (EEST)
- Postal code: 807200
- Vehicle reg.: GL
- Website: www.primaria-munteni.ro

Munteni is a commune in Galați County, Western Moldavia, Romania with a population of 6,791 people. It is composed of four villages: Frunzeasca, Munteni, Țigănești, and Ungureni. It also included two other villages until 2004, when they were split off to form Negrilești Commune.

== Natives ==
- Cocuța Conachi (1829–1870), princess and revolutionary
- Costache Conachi (1777–1849), writer
- Gabriel Marin (born 1972), rower
- Eugenio Ruspoli (1866–1893), Italian explorer and naturalist
- Mario Ruspoli, 2nd Prince of Poggio Suasa (1867–1963), Italian prince
