= Alexander Bogoridi =

Bulgarian politician (1822–1910)

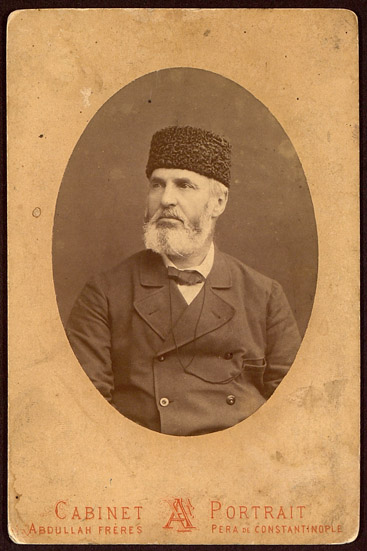

Governor General of Eastern Rumelia
- In office 16 May 1879 – 16 May 1884
- Preceded by: Position created
- Succeeded by: Gavril Krastevich

Personal details
- Born: 5 April 1822 Constantinople, Ottoman Empire (now Turkey)
- Died: 17 July 1910 (aged 88) Paris, France
- Parents: Stefan Bogoridi (father); Princess Raluca Scanavi (mother)

Prince (Knyaz) Alexander Stefanov Bogoridi (Bulgarian: княз Александър (Алеко) Стефанов Богориди; Turkish: Aleko Paşa; Greek: Αλέξανδρος Βογορίδης; Romanian: Alexandr Vogoride) (1822 – July 17, 1910) was an Ottoman statesman of Bulgarian origin.

Born in Constantinople, Alexander Bogoridi was the youngest son of one of the most influential persons in the Ottoman Empire – Stefan Bogoridi – and brother of Nicolae Vogoride, who became a prominent Moldavian politician. Alexander Bogoridi studied in the Greek School in Phanar, in Constantinople and in France.

He received his higher education in State Law in Germany. He held high-ranking positions as a statesman in the Ottoman Empire – member of the State Council, Minister of Public Works, Posts and Telegraphs, diplomatic agent in Moldavia, member of the diplomatic mission in the United Kingdom of Great Britain and Ireland, and ambassador in Austria-Hungary (1876–1877).

After the 1877–1878 War with the Russian Empire and the subsequent Treaty of Berlin with the protection of the Russian Emperor Alexander II and with the consent of the Great Powers, Alexander Bogoridi was appointed Governor-General of Eastern Rumelia on March 13, 1879. He was connected to the Liberal Party leaders expelled from the Principality of Bulgaria – Petko Slaveykov and Petko Karavelov.

After the abdication of Prince Alexander I in 1886, Alexander Bogoridi was one of the candidates for the Bulgarian throne, alongside his nephew, Emanuil. He died in Paris.
