= José Vieira Dias Van-Dúnem =

Angolan politician

José Vieira Dias Van-Dunem
- Born: Angola
- Occupation: Politician

José Vieira Dias Van-Dunem is an Angolan politician. He is the current Minister of Health of Angola, as well as a member of parliament. He is member of MPLA.
