= Cabinet of Marek Belka =

Cabinet of Marek Belka may refer to:

- First Cabinet of Marek Belka - from May 2, 2004, to June 11, 2004
- Second Cabinet of Marek Belka - from June 11, 2004, to October 31, 2005
