= South Bengal =

Southern part of Bengal covering India and Bangladesh

Coordinates: 23.0°N 88.6°E

South Bengal (Bengali: দক্ষিণবঙ্গ/দক্ষিণ বাংলা) is a term used for the southern parts of Bengal including Southern Bangladesh and Southern West Bengal, state in India.

The Bangladesh part denotes the Khulna Division, Faridpur Division and Barisal Division. The West Bengal part denotes the Presidency Division, Burdwan Division, Medinipur Division and Murshidabad district of Malda Division. Bay of Bengal is located at the end of southern part of Bangladesh and West Bengal.

== Regions ==
South Bengal (Bangladesh)			South Bengal (West Bengal, India)			
Barisal Division	Khulna Division	Faridpur Division	Burdwan division	Presidency division	Medinipur division	Malda division
Barguna District; Barisal District; Bhola District; Jhalokati District; Patuakhali District; Pirojpur District	Bagerhat District; Chuadanga District; Jessore District; Jhenaidah District; Khulna District; Kushtia District; Magura District; Meherpur District; Narail District; Satkhira District	Faridpur District; Gopalganj District; Madaripur District; Rajbari District; Shariatpur District	Hooghly district; Purba Bardhaman district; Paschim Bardhaman district; Birbhum district	Howrah district; Kolkata district; Nadia district; North 24 Parganas district; South 24 Parganas district	Purba Medinipur district; Paschim Medinipur district; Jhargram district; Purulia district; Bankura district	Murshidabad district

=== Combined Demographics (2011) ===
Religious Demographics of Greater South Bengal (Combined 2011 Census)
1. Hindu (55.5%)
2. Muslim (42.9%)
3. Others (1.59%)

The total population of the South Bengal is 103,046,450 (10.3 crore) as per the 2011 census data from both India and Bangladesh.

== Cities and towns ==
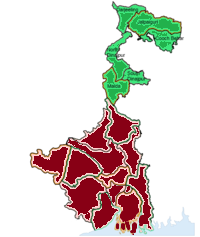
West Bengal

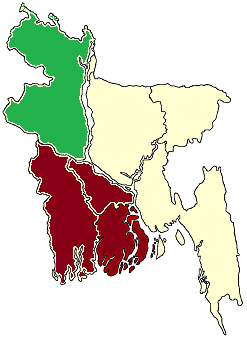
Bangladesh

Maps of the West Bengal (India) and Bangladesh, showing North Bengal in green and the South Bengal in red.

Major cities and towns in the South Bengal are (in alphabetical order):

=== Bangladesh ===
- Alfadanga
- Bakerganj
- Bagerhat
- Barisal
- Barguna
- Benapole
- Boalmari
- Bhola
- Chuadanga
- Faridpur
- Gopalgonj
- Jessore
- Jhalokati
- Jhenaidah
- Khulna
- Kuakata
- Kushtia
- Keshabpur
- Madaripur
- Madhukhali
- Magura
- Meherpur
- Mongla
- Narail
- Patuakhali
- Pirojpur
- Rajbari
- Satkhira
- Shariatpur

=== West Bengal ===
- Adra
- Amtala
- Arambag
- Asansol
- Bakkhali
- Balarampur
- Bankura
- Bangaon
- Barakpur
- Barasat
- Bardhamaan
- Baruipur
- Basirhat
- Berhampore
- Bishnupur
- Bolpur
- Budge Budge
- Canning
- Chandpara
- Chandannagar
- Danton
- Diamond Harbour
- Digha
- Dubrajpur
- Durgapur
- Gobardanga
- Gangasagar
- Ghatal
- Habra
- Haldia
- Hasnabad
- Hooghly
- Haorah
- Jaynagar Majilpur
- Jhargram
- Kakdwip
- Kanthi
- Kalna
- Kalyani
- Kanchrapara
- Katwa
- Kharagpur
- Kolkata
- Krishnanagar
- Maheshtala
- Medinipur
- Nabadwip
- Nalhati
- Namkhana
- Palashi
- Pujali
- Puruliya
- Rajarhat
- Rajpur Sonarpur
- Rampurhat
- Ranaghat
- Sainthia
- Serampur
- Shantipur
- Siuri
- Taki
- Tarakeswar
- Tarapith
- Tamluk
- Tehatta
- Thakurnagar
- Chakdaha
- Naihati

== In sport ==
The South Zone cricket team in Bangladesh is a first-class cricket team that represents southern Bangladesh (Khulna and Barisal) in the Bangladesh Cricket League (BCL).

== See also ==
- North Bengal
- South Zone cricket team
- Bengal
