= Faridpur-1 =

Constituency of Bangladesh's Jatiya Sangsad

Coordinates: 23.39°N 89.68°E

- Constituency for the Jatiya Sangsad
- District: Faridpur District
- Division: Dhaka Division
- Electorate: 510,540 (2026)

Current constituency
- Created: 1973
- Party: Bangladesh Jamaat-e-Islami
- Member: Md. Elias Molla
- ← 210 Rajbari-2 212 Faridpur-2 →

Faridpur-1 is a constituency represented in the Jatiya Sangsad (National Parliament) of Bangladesh since 2026 by Md. Elias Molla of the Bangladesh Jamaat-e-Islami.

== Boundaries ==
The constituency encompasses Alfadanga, Boalmari, and Madhukhali upazilas.

== History ==
The constituency was created for the first general elections in newly independent Bangladesh, held in 1973.

== Members of Parliament ==
Election	Member	Party
1973	S. A. Malek	Awami League
1979	ABM Golam Mustafa	Bangladesh Nationalist Party
Major Boundary Changes
1986	Shah Mohammad Abu Zafar	Jatiya Party
1991	Md. Abdur Rouf Miah	Awami League
Feb 1996	Khandaker Nasirul Islam	Independent
Jun 1996	Kazi Sirajul Islam	Awami League
2005 by-election	Shah Mohammad Abu Zafar	Bangladesh Nationalist Party
2008	Abdur Rahman	Awami League
2014	Abdur Rahman	Awami League
2018	Monzur Hossain	Awami League
2024	Abdur Rahman	Awami League
2026	Md. Elias Molla	Bangladesh Jamaat-e-Islami

== Elections ==
=== Elections in the 2020s ===
General Election 2026: Faridpur-1 (Note: The Business Standard lists a ninth candidate, independent Arifur Rahman Dolan. His candidacy was cancelled, reinstated on appeal, and finally suspended by the Appellate Division, Supreme Court of Bangladesh on 1 February 2026. No votes were tabulated for him.)
Party	Candidate	Votes	%	±%
Jamaat	Md. Elias Molla	154,145	48.3	N/A
BNP	Khandaker Nasirul Islam	126,476	39.6	N/A
Independent	Md. Abul Bashar Khan	34,387	10.8	N/A
Independent	Md. Golam Kabir Mia	2,159	0.7	N/A
BMJP	Mrinmoy Kanti Das	786	0.2	N/A
JP(E)	Sultan Ahmed Khan	506	0.2	N/A
Independent	Md. Hasibur Rahman	455	0.1	N/A
Independent	Sheikh Abdur Rahman Jiko	84	0.0	N/A
Majority		27,669	8.7	N/A
Turnout		318,998	62.5	N/A
Jamaat gain from AL				

=== Elections in the 2010s ===
Abdur Rahman was re-elected unopposed in the 2014 general election after opposition parties withdrew their candidacies in a boycott of the election.

=== Elections in the 2000s ===
General Election 2008: Faridpur-1
Party	Candidate	Votes	%	±%
AL	Abdur Rahman	175,387	61.8	
BNP	Shah Mohammad Abu Zafar	72,285	25.5	
Independent	Kazi Sirajul Islam	32,928	11.6	
IAB	Md. Hafizur Rahman	2,278	0.8	
Bangladesh Kalyan Party	Md. Kamruzzaman Mrida	669	0.2	
Gano Forum	S. M. Kaysir Rahman Sharif	137	0.0	
Majority		103,102	36.3	
Turnout		283,684	89.4	
AL gain from BNP				

In 2005, Kazi Sirajul Islam joined the BNP. This led to the Election Commission declaring his seat vacant on 4 June 2005 under Article 70 of the Constitution, which penalizes floor-crossing. Shah Mohammad Abu Zafar of the BNP was elected in an August 2005 by-election.

General Election 2001: Faridpur-1
Party	Candidate	Votes	%	±%
AL	Kazi Sirajul Islam	126,858	50.9	+3.2
BNP	Shah Mohammad Abu Zafar	119,912	48.1	+46.1
IJOF	Md. Akteruzzaman Khan	1,177	0.5	N/A
CPB	Abdul Maleq Shikder	804	0.3	N/A
BKA	Md. A. Rashed	416	0.2	N/A
Independent	K. M. Noor Islam Sikder	208	0.1	N/A
Majority		6,946	2.8	−1.7
Turnout		249,375	81.6	−1.0
AL hold				

=== Elections in the 1990s ===
General Election June 1996: Faridpur-1
Party	Candidate	Votes	%	±%
AL	Kazi Sirajul Islam	93,864	47.7	+5.3
JP(E)	Shah Mohammad Abu Zafar	84,985	43.2	+15.1
Jamaat	Habibur Rahman	12,296	6.3	−8.5
BNP	Khandakar Nasirul Islam	3,984	2.0	−6.4
Zaker Party	Md. Saiful Islam	908	0.5	−1.1
CPB	Md. Abdul Malek Sikdar	572	0.3	N/A
Independent	Qazi Mahatab-Ul-Islam	126	0.1	N/A
Majority		8,879	4.5	−9.8
Turnout		196,735	82.6	+25.6
AL hold				

General Election 1991: Faridpur-1
Party	Candidate	Votes	%	±%
AL	Md. Abdur Rouf Miah	68,027	42.4	
JP(E)	Shah Mohammad Abu Zafar	45,134	28.1	
Jamaat	Habibur Rahman	23,797	14.8	
BNP	A K M Shamsul Bari	13,485	8.4	
Bangladesh Janata Party	Md. Mozaffor Hossein	4,443	2.8	
Zaker Party	Md. Lutfor Rahman	2,520	1.6	
BKA	Md. Siddiqur Rahman	1,847	1.2	
UCL	Md. Abu Sayeed Miah	972	0.6	
BAKSAL	Abu Zafar Miah	215	0.1	
Jatiya Jukta Front	Md. Yunus Ali Biswash	169	0.1	
Majority		22,893	14.3	
Turnout		160,609	57.0	
AL gain from JP(E)				
