= Md. Elias Molla =

Bangladeshi politician (born 1955)

- মোঃ ইলিয়াস মোল্লা
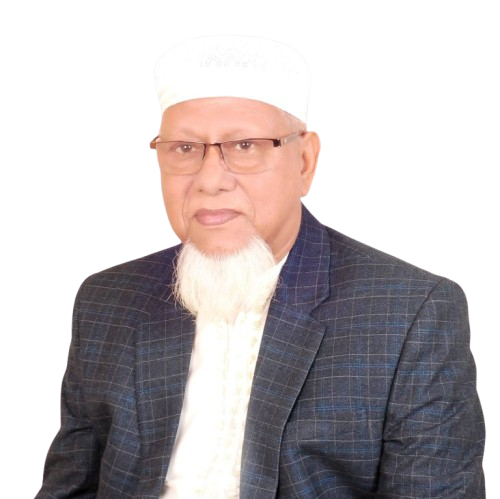
- Elias Molla

Member of the Bangladesh Parliament for Faridpur-1
- Incumbent
- Assumed office 17 February 2026
- Preceded by: Abdur Rahman

Personal details
- Born: 31 December 1955 (age 70) Madhukhali Upazila, Faridpur District
- Party: Bangladesh Jamaat-e-Islami

Md. Elias Molla is a Bangladeshi politician. As of March 2026, he is serving as a member of parliament from Faridpur-1.

== Early life ==
Molla was born on 31 December 1955 at Madhukhali Upazila under Faridpur District.
