= Khandaker Nasirul Islam =

Bangladeshi politician

Member of Bangladesh Parliament
- In office 15 February 1996 – 12 June 1996
- Preceded by: Md. Abdur Rouf Miah
- Succeeded by: Kazi Sirajul Islam

Personal details
- Political party: Bangladesh Nationalist Party

Khandaker Nasirul Islam (Bengali: খন্দকার নাসিরুল ইসলাম) is a Bangladesh Nationalist Party politician and a member of parliament from Faridpur-1.

== Career ==
Islam was elected to parliament from Faridpur-1 as a Bangladesh Nationalist Party candidate on 15 February 1996.

On 4 July 2005, 62 politicians of the Bangladesh Nationalist Party, including Islam, were sued for attacking Awami League politicians during a visit by Kazi Siraj who had recently left Bangladesh Nationalist Party and joined Awami League.
