= Boalmari Upazila =

Boalmari বোয়ালমারী
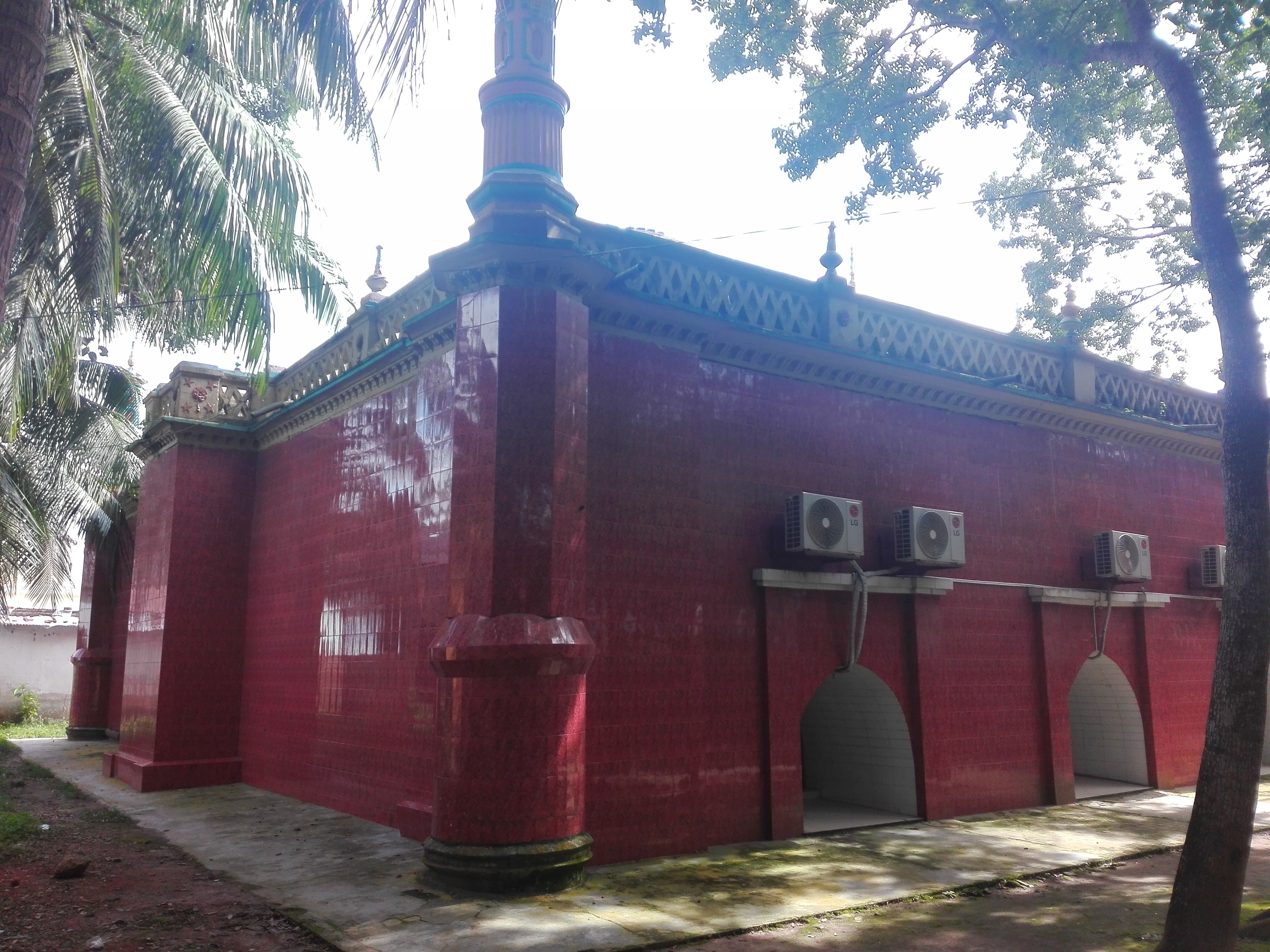
- Satoir Mosque

- Coordinates: 23°23.5′N 89°41′E
- Country: Bangladesh
- Division: Dhaka
- District: Faridpur
- Thana: 1814
- Upazila: 1983

Government
  - Upazila Chairman: Alhaj MM Mosharraf Husayn

Area
  - Total: 271.73 km^{2} (104.92 sq mi)

Population (2022)
  - Total: 268,150
  - Density: 986.83/km^{2} (2,555.9/sq mi)
- Time zone: UTC+6 (BST)
- Postal code: 7860
- Area code: 06324
- Website: boalmari.faridpur.gov.bd

Boalmari Upazila mauza geocode map

Boalmari (Bengali: বোয়ালমারী) is an upazila (sub-district) of Faridpur District in central Bangladesh, located in the Dhaka Division. It is named after its headquarters, the town of Boalmari.

== Geography ==
Boalmari Upazila has a total area of 271.73 km^{2}. It is bounded by Madhukhali Upazila and Faridpur Sadar Upazila on the north, Saltha Upazila on the east, Alfadanga Upazila, Barashia River & Kashiani Upazila on the south and the Madhumati River on the west. The Old Kumar River runs across the eastern side of the Upazila. The Nader Chand, Chapradah, and Chitlia beels are also principal to the Upazila.

== History ==
The history of Boalmari dates back centuries. In the 16th century, the village of Satoir became a principal institution of Boalmari's Islamic civilization, aiding with the development of local society. It was home to several influential Sufi walis such as Shah Saturi. Saturi's murid was the Sultan of Bengal Alauddin Husain Shah, under whose instruction a congregational mosque was established in Satoir, later becoming a part of the Grand Trunk Road. In the 18th century, a mystic known as Dewan Saghir Shah gained popularity. He was based in Katagarh, where he was later buried in a mazar.

The thana (administrative police station) of Bhusna was moved to Saidpur in 1812. In 1814, a thana was established in the town of Boalmari comprising 19 unions. Later, the unions of Bana and Pachuria were given to Alfadanga Thana. During the Bangladesh Liberation War of 1971, a brawl took place between Bengali freedom fighters and the Pakistan Army in Natubdia Bazar on 9 December. Another battle took place in Chandpur and Dhopadanga which led to the deaths of 11 freedom fighters and 49 Pakistan-allied soldiers including Major Mafiz.

Boalmari Thana was granted Upazila status in 1983 as part of the erstwhile President of Bangladesh Hussain Muhammad Ershad's decentralization program. However, 6 of its unions were given to the new Madhukhali Upazila.

== Mythology ==
Boalmari has a legendary folk culture. It is said that in 1813, a young man named Chand who lived on the banks of the Madhumati River, traveled to the Kamakhya Temple of Assam where he studied magic. Returning to Boalmari in the form of a crocodile to show off his talent. He muttered a few sounds in a pot of water which he told his wife that if sprinkled on his body, he would become a human again. However, his wife fainted in fear. The locals then brought out sticks with the intention of killing Chand. Moving around in fear, the pot of water accidentally spilled on Chand's tail causing his tail to take a human form. After this, the locals realized that this was not a crocodile, but it was actually Chand. In a crocodile-humanoid state, Chand retreated to the Madhumati River where he continued his life. One day, a British colonial officer shot Chand and killed him, causing him to drown in the Madhumati River. In the memory of this incident, a ferry ghat, beel, mouza, and post office in Boalmari were named Nader Chand after the crocodile-man Chand. The beel is located in southern Boalmari, just south of Gunbaha.

== Demographics ==
Religions in Boalmari Upazila (2022)
Religion	Percent
Islam	89.35%
Hinduism	10.59%
Other or not stated	0.06%

According to the 2022 Bangladeshi census, Boalmari Upazila had 65,097 households and a population of 268,150. 10.10% of the population were under 5 years of age. Boalmari had a literacy rate (age 7 and over) of 71.19%: 72.05% for males and 70.39% for females, and a sex ratio of 94.67 males for every 100 females. 39,083 (14.58%) lived in urban areas.

As of the 2011 Census of Bangladesh, Boalmari upazila had 56,262 households and a population of 256,658. 61,713 (24.04%) were under 10 years of age. Boalmari had an average literacy rate of 47.33%, compared to the national average of 51.8%, and a sex ratio of 1030 females per 1000 males. 27,595 (10.75%) of the population lived in urban areas.

As of the 1991 Bangladesh census, Boalmari has a population of 190159. Males constitute 50.63% of the population, and females 49.37%. This Upazila's eighteen+ population is 94073. The vast majority of Boalmari Upazila's inhabitants are Bengali Muslims.

== Education and facilities ==
The average literacy rate of Boalmari Upazila is 27% (7+ years), and a national average of 32.4% is literate. In Boalmari Upazila, there are 7 Colleges, 12 High Schools, 12 Alia madrasas, 118 Furqania madrasas, 9 Hafizia madrasas and 6 Qawmi Madrasahs. Out of its 480 mosques, the Satoir Jame Mosque is notable.

Colleges in Boalmari
Name	Principal / Headteacher
Bir Muktijoddha Engr Dr Shafiuddin School & College (EIIN:138783, Code:5229)	Mst Shima Parvin; Protisthata Porichalok: Engr. Dr. Shafiuddin Ahmed
Bongabandhu College (EIIN: 108711)	Mohammad Sadinur Miah
Bonadapasha Hazera Mokbul College (EIIN: 137592)	Mohammad Sadinur Miah
Govt Boalmari College (EIIN: 108708)	Mohammad -----
Kazi Shirajul Islam Mohila college (EIIN: 108709)	Mohammad -----
Kadirdi College (EIIN: 108710)	Md. Nuruzzaman Molla
Shah Zafar Technical College (EIIN: 132430)	Mohammad Liton Miah

High Schools in Boalmari
Name	Principal / Headteacher
Bandapasha Adorsho High School	Md. -----
Boalmari George Academy	Mohammad Abdul Aziz
Bhimpur High School	Md. -----
Bir Muktijoddha Engr. Dr. Shofiuddin High School	Mst. Mini Parvin; Protisthata Porichalok: Engr. Dr. Shafiuddin Ahmed
Boalmari Gov. Girl's High School	Md. -----
Hasamdia United High School	Mrs. -----
Khorsuti Chandra Kishore High School	Mrs. -----
Madhubarni High School	Mohammad -----
Moyna A. C. Bose Institution	Mohammad Obaidur Rahman
Nader Chand K C Das Academy	Mohammad Asaduzzaman
Rajapur High School	Md. -----
Rupabat Bamana High School	Md. -----
Satair High School	Mohammad -----
Shirgram High School	Mohammad -----
Teljuri High School	Md. -----
Umarnagar Chondani High School	Muhammad Ishaq Molla
Gohailbari Madhyamik Bidyalay	Md Ayub Ali

Madrasas & Orphanages in Boalmari
Name	Headteacher
Taltola Muhammadia Hafizia Madrasa	Hafiz Habibur Rahman
Qadirdi Dakhil Madrasa	Muhammad Tawakkul Ali
Solna Salamia Fazil Madrasa & Orphanage	Muhammad -----
Abdul Aziz Islamia Dakhil Madrasa & Orphanage	Muhammad -----
Al-Hasan Womens Madrasa & Orphanage	Muhammad Abdul Quddus
Baikhir Banchaki Fazil Madrasa & Orphanage	Muhammad Mustafizur Rahman
Daharnagar Shah Zafar Islamia Dakhil Madrasa & Orphanage	Muhammad -----
Dobra Siddiqia Senior Alim Madrasa & Orphanage	Muhammad Abul Hasan
Hariharnagar Senior Madrasa & Orphanage	Muhammad Munaim Husayn
Hatkholarchar Muhammadia Dakhil Madrasa & Orphanage	Muhammad Abu Zafar Siddiqi
Qadami Abu Zafar Siddiqia Senior Madrasa & Orphanage	ATM Abdus Salam
Katagarh Dewan Saghir Shah Dakhil Madrasa & Orphanage	Muhammad Siddiqur Rahman Mullah
Rakhalgachhi Qazi Sirajul Islam Dakhil Madrasa & Orphanage	Muhammad Yunus Ali
Kondardia Islamia Dakhil Madrasa & Orphanage	Muhammad -----
Shaharul Layla Deena Alim Madrasa & Orphanage	Muhammad -----
Satoir JIDS Senior Madrasa & Orphanage	Muhammad Husayn Ahmad
Umarnagar Chandani Dakhil Madrasa & Orphanage	Muhammad Raqibul Islam Raqib
East Bhatdi Islamia Dakhil Madrasa & Orphanage	Muhammad -----
Murail Sultan & Shafi (SS) Islamia Mohila Madrasa & Orphanage	Alhaj Moulana Md. Abdus Sattar; Protisthata Porichalok: Engr. Dr. Shafiuddin Ahmed

== Administration ==
Boalmari Upazila is divided into Boalmari Municipality and 11 union parishads: Boalmari, Chandpur, Chatul, Dadpur, Ghoshpur, Gunbaha, Moyna, Parameshwardi, Rupapat, Satair, and Shekhar. The union parishads are subdivided into 173 mauzas and 251 villages.

Boalmari Municipality is subdivided into 9 wards and 18 mahallas.

=== List of chairmen ===
List of chairmen
Name	Term	Notes
Syed Abdur Rahman Bashar	25/5/1985-24/5/1990	
AKM Jamaluddin Nanu Mia	25/5/1990-18/11/1991	
Alhaj M Mosharraf Husayn Musa Mia	23/2/2009–present	

== Notable residents ==
- Shah Mohammad Abu Zafar; Bir Muktijoddha MP, (est. Shah Zafar Technical College)
- Md. Abdur Rouf Miah; Bir Muktijoddha, MP, Educationist (est. Bangabandhu College)
- Kazi family of Rajapur, Boalmari
  - Nawab Kazi Abdul Lateef (1828–1893), aristocrat and educator
  - Kazi Abu Muhammad Abdul Ghafur Nassakh (1834–1889), magistrate and writer
  - Kazi Abul Monsur (1918–1996), microbiologist and physician
  - Kazi Salahuddin (born 1953), president of South Asian Football Federation
  - Kazi Shahidul Alam (born 1955), photojournalist and social activist

== See also ==
- Upazilas of Bangladesh
- Districts of Bangladesh
- Divisions of Bangladesh
