= Jyeshtha (month) =

Third month of the Hindu lunar calendar

- Native name: ज्येष्ठ (Sanskrit)
- Calendar: Hindu calendar
- Month number: 2 (solar), 3 (lunar)
- Number of days: 29 or 30
- Season: Grishma (summer)
- Gregorian equivalent: May-June
- Significant days: Ganga Dussehra; Jamai Sasthi; Nirjala Ekadashi; Sitalsasthi Carnival; Snana Yatra; Vat Purnima

Jyeshtha (IAST: Jyēṣṭha) is the third month of the Hindu lunar calendar and the Indian national calendar. The name of the month is derived from the position of the Moon near the Jyeshtha nakshatra (star) on the full moon day. The month corresponds to summer (Grishma) season and falls in May–June of the Gregorian calendar.

In the Hindu solar calendar, it corresponds to Vṛṣabha (Taurus), the second month, and begins with the Sun's entry into Taurus. It corresponds to Joishtho, the second month in the Bengali calendar. In the Tamil calendar, it corresponds to the third month of Āni, falling in the Gregorian months of June–July. In the Vaishnav calendar, it corresponds to the third month of Trivikrama.

In the Hindu lunar calendar, each month has 29 or 30 days. The month begins on the next day after Amavasya (new moon) or Purnima (full moon) as per amanta and purnimanta systems respectively. A month consists of two cycles, Shukla Paksha (waxing moon) and Krishna Paksha (waning moon), each with 15 individually-named thithi (days); each thithi occurs twice per month.

== Festivals ==
- Ganga Dussehra is celebrated to commemorate the descent of the Ganges river from heaven to earth. It is celebrated on Dashami (tenth day) tithi of the Shukla Paksha (waxing moon). In Hindu mythology, bathing in the river on this day is said to rid the bather of ten lifetimes of sins.
- Jamai Sasthi is celebrated by Bengalis on Shashthi, the sixth tithi of Shukla Paksha. It is dedicated to the son-in-laws, who are invited by the wife's parents to their house for the celebrations.
- Nirjala Ekadashi is celebrated on Ekadashi (11th day) of Shukla Paksha. It is the most sacred and auspicious Ekadashi in the year, and people fast during the day to please Hindu god Vishnu.
- Shani Dev Jayanti is celebrated on Amavasya (new moon) of the month. It is dedicated to Shani (Saturn), one of the navagrahas.
- Sitalsasthi celebrates the marriage of Hindu god Shiva with Parvati. It is commemorated on the Shashthi thithi.
- Snana Yatra is a bathing festival celebrated on the Purnima (full moon) of the month. It commemorates the birthday of Hindu god Jagannath, and is a major festival in Jagannath temple in Puri. The deities Jagannath, Balabhadra, and Subhadra are taken for procession and ceremonially bathed.
- Vat Purnima is celebrated on the full moon day of the month. It honors Satyavan's wife Savitri, who rescued her husband from death by using her intelligence and devotion. Women pray for their husbands by tying threads around a banyan tree on this day.

== See also ==
- Astronomical basis of the Hindu calendar
- Indian astronomy
- Hindu astrology
- Hindu units of time
