= ABM Golam Mustafa =

Bangladeshi politician

A. B. M. Golam Mustafa
- এ. বি. এম. গোলাম মুস্তাফা

Member of Bangladesh Parliament
- In office 1979–1986
- Preceded by: S. A. Malek
- Succeeded by: Shah Mohammad Abu Zafar

Personal details
- Party: Bangladesh Nationalist Party

ABM Golam Mustafa is a Bangladesh Nationalist Party politician and a former member of parliament for Faridpur-1.

== Career ==
Mustafa was elected to parliament from Faridpur-1 as a Bangladesh Nationalist Party candidate in 1979.
