= Malledevarapura =

Coordinates: 12°51′16″N 76°7′54″E

Malledevarapura is a tiny village of Hassan district in Karnataka. It is about 10 km from Gorur. This village is famous for its Shashti Jatra during the month of December. Jatra will held in the hill Malleshwara betta where the Malleshwara temple is situated. In the hill there is big single rock Katthigallu, which is about 80 feet long.
