= Saltha Upazila =

Saltha সালথা
- Upazila
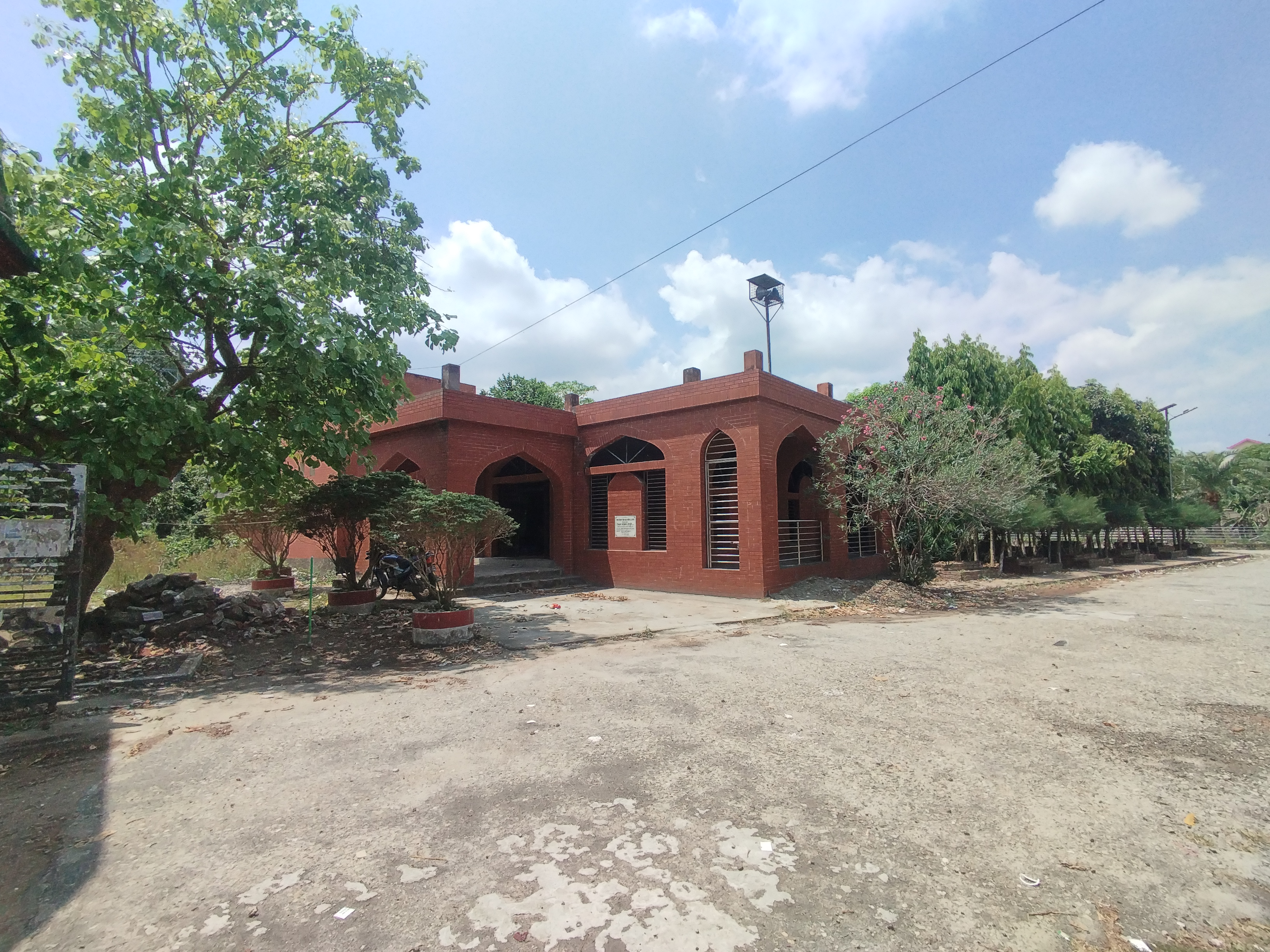
- A mosque in Saltha Upazila

- Coordinates: 23°33.5′N 90°5′E
- Country: Bangladesh
- Division: Dhaka
- District: Faridpur

Area
  - Total: 186.20 km^{2} (71.89 sq mi)
- Elevation: 8 m (26 ft)

Population (2022)
  - Total: 186,215
  - Density: 1,000.1/km^{2} (2,590.2/sq mi)
- Time zone: UTC+6 (BST)
- Postal code: 7840
- Website: saltha.faridpur.gov.bd

Saltha (Bengali: সালথা) is an upazila of Faridpur District in the Division of Dhaka, Bangladesh. Bounded by Faridpur Sadar Upazila on the north, Muksudpur and Kashiani Upazilas on the south, Nagarkanda Upazila on the east and Boalmari Upazila on the west, Saltha Upazila has an area 186.20' km^{2}, located in between 23°18' and 23°30' north latitudes and in between 89°43' and 89°53' east longitudes. Saltha upazila was formed in 2006 from Nagarkanda upazila.

Saltha Upazila mauza geocode map

== Demographics ==
Religions in Saltha Upazila (2022)
Religion	Percent
Islam	94.14%
Hinduism	5.86%

According to the 2022 Bangladeshi census, Saltha Upazila had 45,260 households and a population of 186,215. 10.87% of the population were under 5 years of age. Saltha had a literacy rate (age 7 and over) of 65.26%: 65.03% for males and 65.47% for females, and a sex ratio of 96.40 males for every 100 females. 13,991 (7.51%) lived in urban areas.

As of the 2011 Census of Bangladesh, Saltha upazila had 35,581 households and a population of 167,446. 44,682 (26.68%) were under 10 years of age. Saltha had an average literacy rate of 38.55%, compared to the national average of 51.8%, and a sex ratio of 1013 females per 1000 males. 9,535 (5.69%) of the population lived in urban areas.

== Administration ==
Saltha Upazila is divided into eight union parishads: Atghar, Ballabhdi, Bhawal, Gatti, Jadunandi, Mazhardia(মাঝারদিয়া), Ramkantapur, and Sonapur. The union parishads are subdivided into 115 mauzas and 159 villages.

== See also ==
- Upazilas of Bangladesh
- Districts of Bangladesh
- Divisions of Bangladesh
- Administrative geography of Bangladesh
