= Manjur Hossain =

Bangladeshi politician

Monzur Hossain
- মনজুর হোসেন

Member of Parliament for Faridpur-1
- In office 30 January 2019 – 7 January 2024
- Preceded by: Abdur Rahman

Personal details
- Born: 1 March 1956
- Died: 30 May 2024 (aged 68)
- Party: Bangladesh Awami League
- Occupation: Politician, businessperson

Monzur Hossain (1 March 1956 – 30 May 2024) was a Bangladesh Awami League politician and former Jatiya Sangsad member representing the Faridpur-1 constituency.

== Career ==
Hossain was elected to parliament from Faridpur-1 as a Bangladesh Awami League candidate 30 December 2018.
