= Mathurapur Deul =

Monument in Faridpur, Bangladesh

- মথুরাপুর দেউল
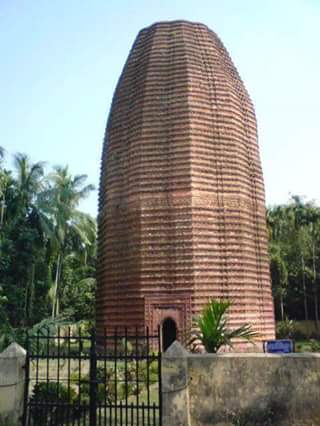

Location
- Location: Faridpur, Dhaka, Bangladesh Mathurapur; Madhukhali Upazila
- Country: Bangladesh

Architecture
- Type: Terracotta
- Completed: 16th century

Mathurapur Deul (Bengali: মথুরাপুর দেউল) is a monastery located in Mathurapur village of Madhukhali Upazila in Faridpur, Bangladesh. The structure is believed to have been built around the 16th century, but some speculate that it is a seventeenth-century building. In 2014, Mathurapur Deul was listed as a World Heritage Site by the Directorate of Archeology of Bangladesh.

== History ==
It was built by a Bengal general named Sangram Singh. After the death of the zamindar Satrajit of Bhusna in 1636, Sangram Singh was entrusted with the revenue collection of the area and became quite powerful under the then ruler. According to local customs, he married the daughter of a doctor family of Kapasti village and settled in Mathurapur. According to another source, Emperor Akbar's general Mansingh built this deul to commemorate his victory over King Pratapaditya. Accordingly, Mathurapur Deul is a victory column. However, it was not possible to verify the truth of the formula.
