= Kazi Sirajul Islam =

Bangladeshi politician

Member of Parliament for Faridpur-1
- In office 14 July 1996 – 4 June 2005
- Preceded by: Md. Abdur Rouf Miah
- Succeeded by: Shah Mohammad Abu Zafar

Personal details
- Party: Bangladesh Awami League

Quazi Sirajul Islam is a Bangladesh Awami League politician and a former Jatiya Sangsad member representing the Faridpur-1 constituency from 1996 until 2005.

== Career ==
Islam was elected to parliament from Faridpur-1 as a Bangladesh Awami League candidate in the 1996 and 2001 general elections. On 3 June 2005, he joined the Bangladesh Nationalist Party (BNP). According to article 70 of the Constitution of Bangladesh, Faridpur-1 then fell vacant and by-elections were called. The BNP originally nominated Islam for the by-election but later changed the nomination to Shah Muhammad Abu Zafar before the election.

Islam later returned to the Bangladesh Awami League and, as of 2017, is serving as the vice-president of the Bangladesh Krishok League in Faridpur District.
