= Nirjala Ekadashi =

Hindu observance

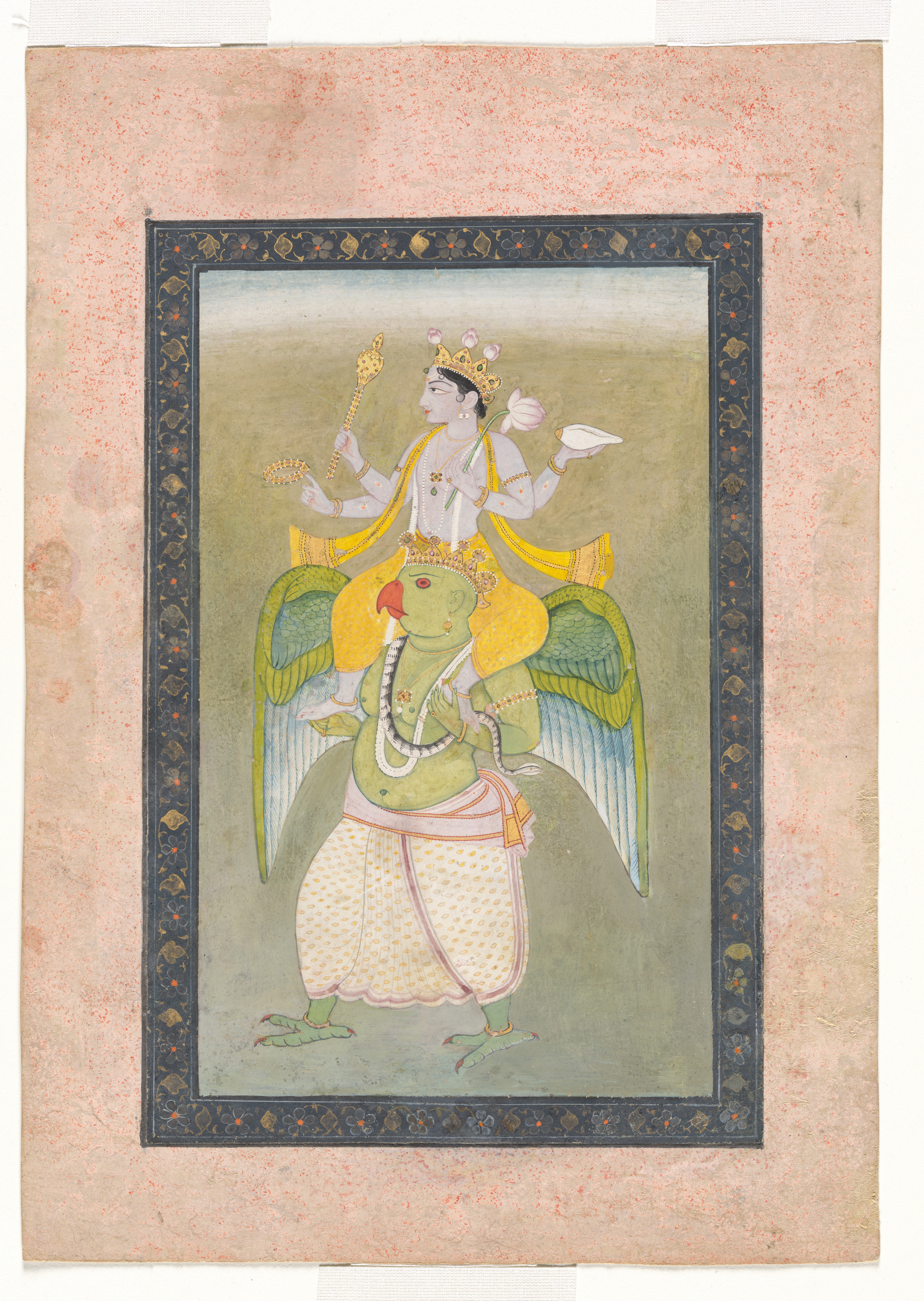
- Painting of Vishnu upon his mount Garuda, venerated during this occasion
- Also called: Pandava Ekadashi, Bhima Ekadashi, Bhimaseni Ekadashi
- Observed by: Hindus
- Type: Hindu
- Significance: According to the Hindu belief, observing Nirjala Ekadashi can grant the spiritual merit of all 24 Ekadashis.
- Observances: Prayers and religious rituals, including puja to Vishnu
- Date: Decided by the lunar calendar

Nirjala Ekadashi (Sanskrit: निर्जला एकादशी, romanized: Nirjalā Ekādaśī) is a Hindu holy day falling on the 11th lunar day (ekadashi) of the waxing fortnight of the Hindu month of Jyeshtha (May/June). This ekadashi derives its name from the water-less (Nir-jala) fast observed on this day. It is considered to be the most austere and hence the most sacred of all 24 ekadashis. If observed religiously, it is said to be the most rewarding and granting the virtue gained by the observance of all 24 ekadashis in the year.

== Legend ==
Nirjala Ekadashi is also known as Pandava Bhima Ekadashi, or Pandava Nirjala Ekadashi. This name is derived from Bhima, the second of the five Pandava brothers, heroes of the Hindu epic Mahabharata. The Brahma Vaivarta Purana narrates the story behind the Nirjala Ekadashi vrata vow. Bhima, a lover of food, wanted to observe all ekadashi fasts, but could not control his hunger. He approached the sage Vyasa, author of the Mahabharata and grandfather of the Pandavas for a solution. The sage advised him to observe Nirjala Ekadashi, when for one or two day in the year, he should observe an absolute fast. Bhima attained the virtue of all 24 ekadashis, by observing Nirjala Ekadashi.

== Practices ==
While on other ekadashis abstinence of food is observed, on Nirjala Ekadashi, an absolute fast is observed, without partaking even water. The water-less fast is considered extremely difficult to follow as the day falls in the hot Indian summer and thus, it is deemed as very pious austerity. The fast is observed 24 hours from sunrise on Nirjala Ekadashi to sunrise the next day. Some observe it from sunrise to sunset. On the day before Nirjala Ekadashi, the devotee performs the evening prayer (Sandhyavandanam) and takes only one meal, without rice - as rice eating is prohibited. The devotee is however permitted to have a single tiny drop of water as part of the Achamana purification ritual. Water more than that equals breaking the vow.

Like other ekadashis, puja is offered to Vishnu, for whom ekadashis are sacred, to seek his grace. An image of Vishnu or a Shaligrama stone (an iconic fossil stone in the form of Vishnu) is bathed (abhisheka) with Panchamrita, a mixture of five foods: milk, curd, ghee (clarified butter), honey and sugar. It is then washed with water and then dressed in royal finery. A hand-fan is also offered. Flowers, incense, water and arati (lamps) are also offered. Devotees meditate on the image of the deity. In the evening, they worship Vishnu with durva grass in their hands. Devotees remain awake the whole night and sing praises of Vishnu or meditate on his image.

Another characteristic of ekadashis is charity to Brahmins (the priest class). Clothes, food grains, umbrellas, hand-fans, pitchers filled with water, gold etc. are prescribed to be donated on Nirjala Ekadashi.

== Significance ==
According to the Markandeya Purana and the Vishnu Purana, the day of Ekadashi is itself a form of Vishnu. The vrata observed on this day is said to wash away all sin. One who completes the vrata of Nirjala Ekadashi is mentioned to gain the favour of Vishnu, who grants him happiness, prosperity and forgiveness for sins. The devotee is described to receive the merit gained by the observance of all 24 ekadshis in the year. It is most popular and strictly observed by the Vaishnavas, in particular

The observer gains longevity and moksha (salvation). Usually, the messengers of the god of death Yama are described to fetch the person's soul after death. Yama then judges the person's deeds and sends him to Svarga (heaven) or Naraka (Hell). However, one who observes the Nirjala Ekadashi rituals is believed to be excused Yama's judgement and taken by messengers of Vishnu to Vaikuntha, the abode of Vishnu, after death.
