= S. A. Malek =

Bangladeshi politician (1936–2022)

Member of Bangladesh Parliament

Personal details
- Born: 18 August 1936; Tangail, Bengal Province, British India
- Died: 6 December 2022 (aged 86); Dhaka, Bangladesh
- Political party: Bangladesh Awami League

S. A. Malek (Bengali: এস. এ. মালেক; 18 August 1936 – 6 December 2022) was a Bangladesh Awami League politician who served as member of parliament for Faridpur-1.

Malek was born on 18 August 1936 in Tangail, Bangladesh. He died of a heart attack on 6 December 2022, at the age of 86.

== Career ==
Malek was elected to parliament from Faridpur-1 as a Bangladesh Awami League candidate in 1973. He served as the political adviser to Prime Minister Sheikh Hasina from 1996 to 2001. He was the general secretary of the Bangabandhu Parishad.
