= Sinivali =

Sinivali (Sanskrit: सिनीवाली, Sinīvālī) is a Vedic goddess, mentioned in two hymns of the Rigveda, in RV 2.32 and RV 10.184. In 2.32.7-8 she is described as broadhipped, fair-armed, fair-fingered, presiding over fecundity and easy birth. She is invoked together with Ganga, Raaka, Saraswati, Indrani and Varunani. In 10.184.2, she is invoked together with Saraswati to place the fetus in the womb. In Atharvaveda 7.46, she is described as the consort of Vishnu. Hence, Sinivali is sometimes identified as goddess Lakshmi.

In later Vedic texts, she is identified with Raka, presiding over the new moon. Here, Sinivali is also mentioned as the name of a daughter of Angiras in the Mahabharata, as well as the wife of Dhatri and the mother of Darsha in the Brahma Purana.
