= Abdur Rahman (Faridpur politician) =

Bangladeshi politician

- আব্দুর রহমান
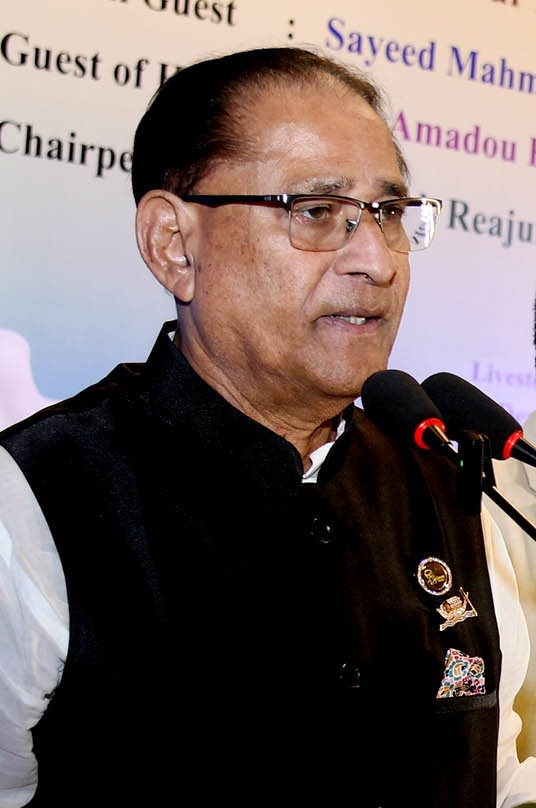
- Abdur in 2024

Minister of Fisheries and Livestock
- In office 11 January 2024 – 6 August 2024
- Prime Minister: Sheikh Hasina
- Preceded by: SM Rezaul Karim

Member of Parliament for Faridpur-1
- In office 30 January 2024 – 6 August 2024
- Preceded by: Manjur Hossain
- In office 23 January 2009 – 30 December 2018
- Preceded by: Shah Mohammad Abu Zafar
- Succeeded by: Manjur Hossain

Personal details
- Born: 14 July 1955 (age 71)
- Party: Bangladesh Awami League
- Education: M.S.S, LL.B.

Abdur Rahman (born 14 July 1955) is a Bangladesh Awami League politician. He was the minister of fisheries and livestock of Bangladesh. Rahman is a former Jatiya Sangsad member representing the Faridpur-1 constituency. He is a presidium member of the Awami League.

== Early life ==
Rahman has an M.S.S. and L.L.B from the University of Dhaka. He was the general secretary of the student political organization Bangladesh Chhatra League from 1986 to 1988.

== Career ==
Rahman was elected to parliament in 2014 from Faridpur-1 as a Bangladesh Awami League candidate.

== Crimes ==
In August 2024, the Anti-Corruption Commission of Bangladesh decided to investigate the allegations of corruption brought against Rahman. A reputable national news outlet has released a video, and another national news outlet has published an article alleging that Abdur Rahman has been involved in money laundering activities, transferring funds to five different countries and purchasing multiple properties in those locations. Citing allegations of money laundering and crimes against civilians, a group of Bangladeshi citizens gathered at Rahman's residence in Paribagh, Dhaka, demanding his public appearance. However, it was later discovered that he had already fled the country.
