= Shah Mohammad Abu Zafar =

Bangladeshi politician

- শাহ মোহাম্মদ আবু জাফর

Member of Parliament for Faridpur-1
- In office 5 September 2005 – 27 October 2006
- Preceded by: Kazi Sirajul Islam
- Succeeded by: Abdur Rahman
- In office 10 July 1986 – 6 December 1990
- Preceded by: ABM Golam Mustafa
- Succeeded by: Md. Abdur Rouf Miah

Personal details
- Party: Janata Party Bangladesh

Shah Muhammad Abu Zafar was a Bangladesh Nationalist Party politician and a 3-term Jatiya Sangsad member representing the Faridpur-1 constituency.

== Career ==
Zafar joined Bangladesh Nationalist Party in 2003 from Jatiya Party. He decided to contest the 30 August 2005 Faridpur-1 by election as an independent candidate after failing to get the Bangladesh Nationalist Party nomination. The by elections were called after Kazi Sirajul Islam, the Bangladesh Awami League member of parliament, joined the Bangladesh Nationalist Party. On 10 August 2005, the Bangladesh Nationalist Party withdrew its nomination of Kazi Sirajul Islam and gave its nomination to Zafar. He won the by election and was sworn into office on 5 September 2005 by Speaker Jamiruddin Sarkar. He was nominated to contest the Faridpur-1 election by Bangladesh Nationalist Party.
