= Jamai Sasthi =

Bengali Hindu festival

- Also called: Arannya Sasthi
- Observed by: Bengali Hindus
- Type: Cultural
- Significance: Family reunion
- Observances: Bangladesh and India
- Date: 01 June 2025 CE (17 Joishtho 1432 BS)
- Duration: One day
- Frequency: Yearly

Jamai Sasthi (Bengali: জামাই ষষ্ঠী) is a traditional cultural ritual of Bengali Hindus. This ritual is performed on the sixth tithi of the Shukla paksha of the Joishtho month. On this day married women and their husbands are invited and entertained by women's parents. In this way, in an attempt to keep the son-in-law happy, the mundane tradition of Shashthi Puja has become the festival of Hindu Bengali's Joishtho month.

== Origin ==
Long ago, in around medieval time in the Indian subcontinent, as girls were often married far away, and transport was expensive & extremely exhausting for long travels, for the girl's parents and entire family to meet their girl would face lot difficulties, on other hand if the girl and her husband would come and stay for few days, all could conveniently meet them in joint families and villages. For this, reason the society rules that on Shukla Shashti of the month of Joishtho, the girl and her husband will be invited to the house of the girl's parents and have Shashthi Puja so that they can have healthy children soon.

According to a legend, a greedy wife of a family used to steal food and blame it on the cat, the vehicle of Goddess Shashthi. When Shashthi came to know about this false allegation, she got angry and took the life of the wife's child, which left the wife grief-stricken. Later, when the goddess approached the wife in the form of an old woman and reminded her of her fault, the wife realized her mistake and apologized, and the goddess brought her child back to life. The people of the society get angry when they come to know about the misdeeds of the wife and restrict her from going to her parents' house. Then on Shashthi Puja day the wife's parents invite her and her husband to come their home and henceforth the day came to be known as Jamai Shashti.

== Significance ==
On this day, mother-in-law performs Shasthi Puja to please Goddess Shasthi and seek her blessings for good luck and prosperity for her daughters and sons-in-law. The son-in-law is invited home and treated to a sumptuous feast of both vegetarian and non-vegetarian food prepared by the mother-in-law. Gifts are also given to daughter-in-law on this day. Jamai Shashti is celebrated as a family reunion day and the whole family comes together to celebrate by having a meal together.
