= Md. Abdur Rouf Miah =

Bangladeshi politician

- মোঃ আবদুর রউফ মিয়া

Member of Bangladesh Parliament
- In office 1991–1996
- Preceded by: Shah Mohammad Abu Zafar
- Succeeded by: Kazi Sirajul Islam

Personal details
- Party: Bangladesh Awami League

Md. Abdur Rouf Miah is a Bangladesh Awami League politician and a former member of parliament for Faridpur-1.

== Career ==
Miah was elected to parliament from Faridpur-1 as a Bangladesh Awami League candidate in 1991.
