= Alfadanga Upazila =

Alfadanga আলফাডাঙ্গা
- Upazila
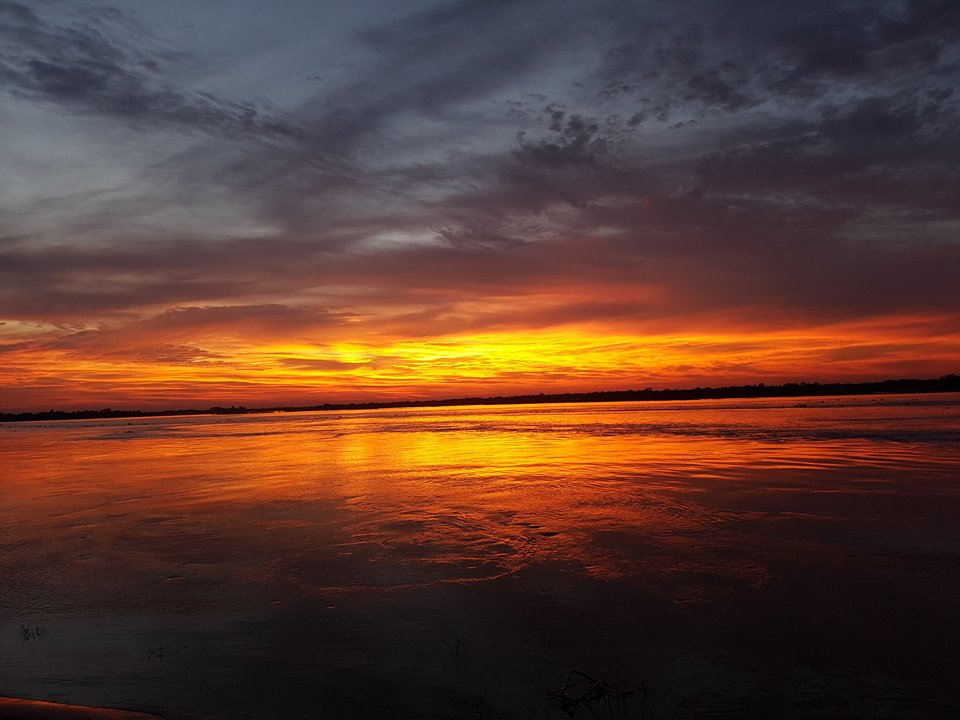
- View of the Madhumati River at Alfadanga

- Coordinates: 23°17′N 89°43′E
- Country: Bangladesh
- Division: Dhaka
- District: Faridpur

Area
  - Total: 127.87 km^{2} (49.37 sq mi)

Population (2022)
  - Total: 119,631
  - Density: 935.57/km^{2} (2,423.1/sq mi)
- Time zone: UTC+6 (BST)
- Postal code: 7870

Alfadanga Upazila mauza geocode map

Alfadanga (Bengali: আলফাডাঙ্গা) is an upazila of Faridpur District in Dhaka Division, Bangladesh.

== Geography ==
Alfadanga is located at 23.2833°N 89.7167°E. It has 24,293 households and total area 127.87 km^{2}.

== Demographics ==
Religions in Alfadanga Upazila (2022)
| Religion | Percent |
| Islam | 93.62% |
| Hinduism | 6.36% |

According to the 2022 Bangladeshi census, Alfadanga Upazila had 29,449 households and a population of 119,631. 10.25% of the population were under 5 years of age. Alfadanga had a literacy rate (age 7 and over) of 74.49%: 75.41% for males and 73.70% for females, and a sex ratio of 89.44 males for every 100 females. 23,796 (19.89%) lived in urban areas.

As of the 2011 Census of Bangladesh, Alfadanga upazila had 24,293 households and a population of 108,302. 25,844 (24.42%) were under 10 years of age. Alfadanga had an average literacy rate of 54.84%, compared to the national average of 51.8%, and a sex ratio of 1099 females per 1000 males. 6,905 (6.38%) of the population lived in urban areas.

As of the 1991 Bangladesh census, Alfadanga has a population of 90,873. Males constitute 49.83% of the population, and females 50.17%. This Upazila's eighteen up population is 43,335. Alfadanga has an average literacy rate of 32.5% (7+ years), and the national average of 32.4% literate.

== Administration ==
Alfadanga Upazila is divided into 6 union parishads: Alfadanga, Bana, Buraich, Gopalpur, Pachuria, and Tagarband. The union parishads are subdivided into 92 mauzas and 122 villages.

== See also ==
- Upazilas of Bangladesh
- Districts of Bangladesh
- Divisions of Bangladesh
- Administrative geography of Bangladesh
