= Faridpur District =

Faridpur District ফরিদপুর জেলা Fatehabad
- District of Bangladesh
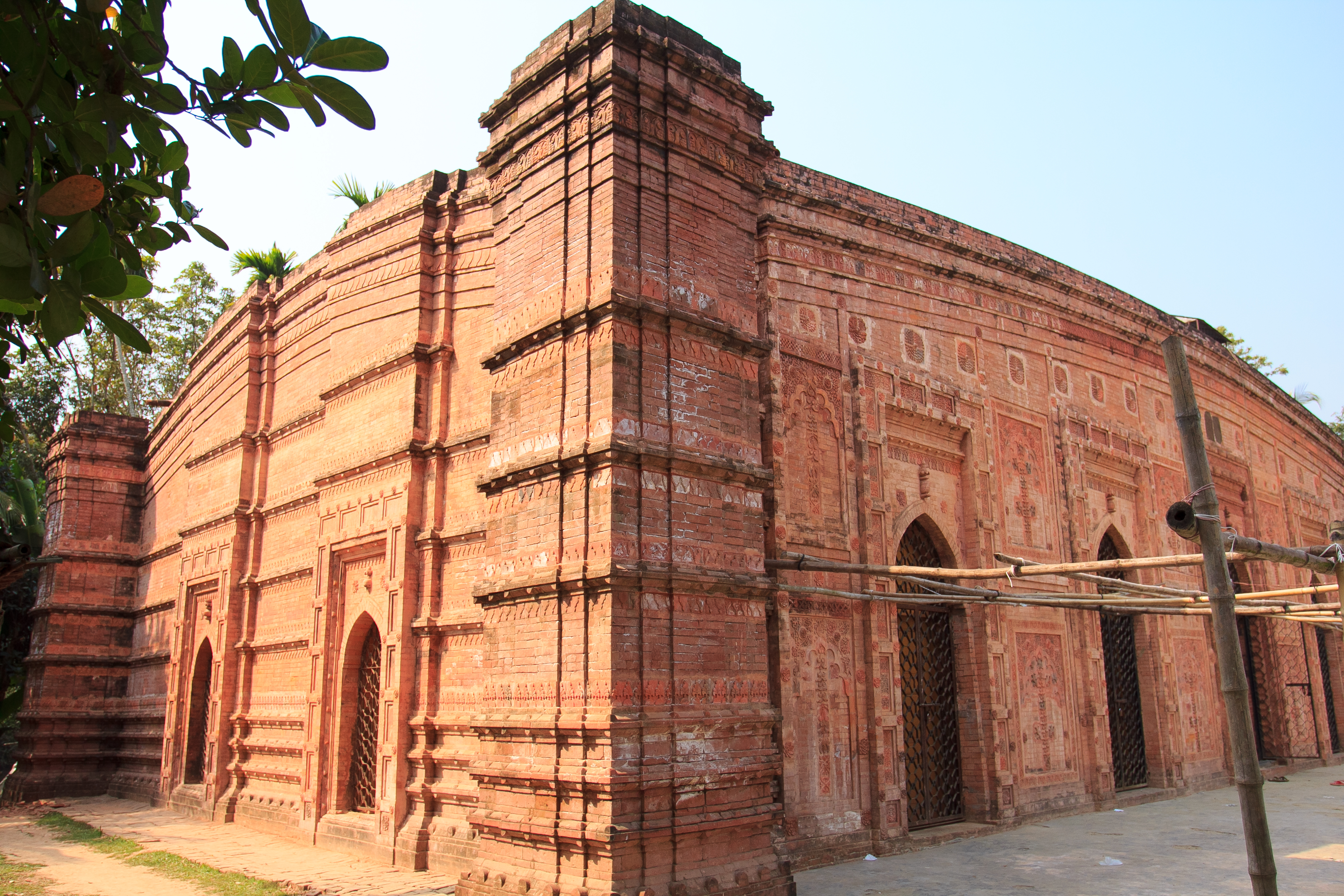
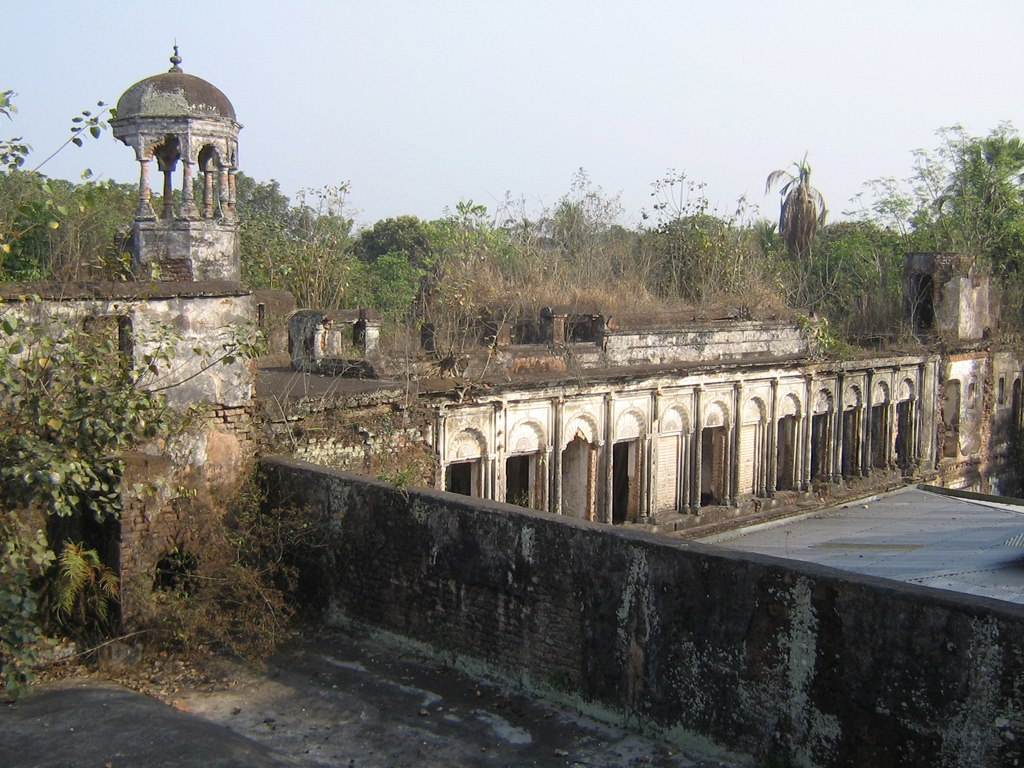
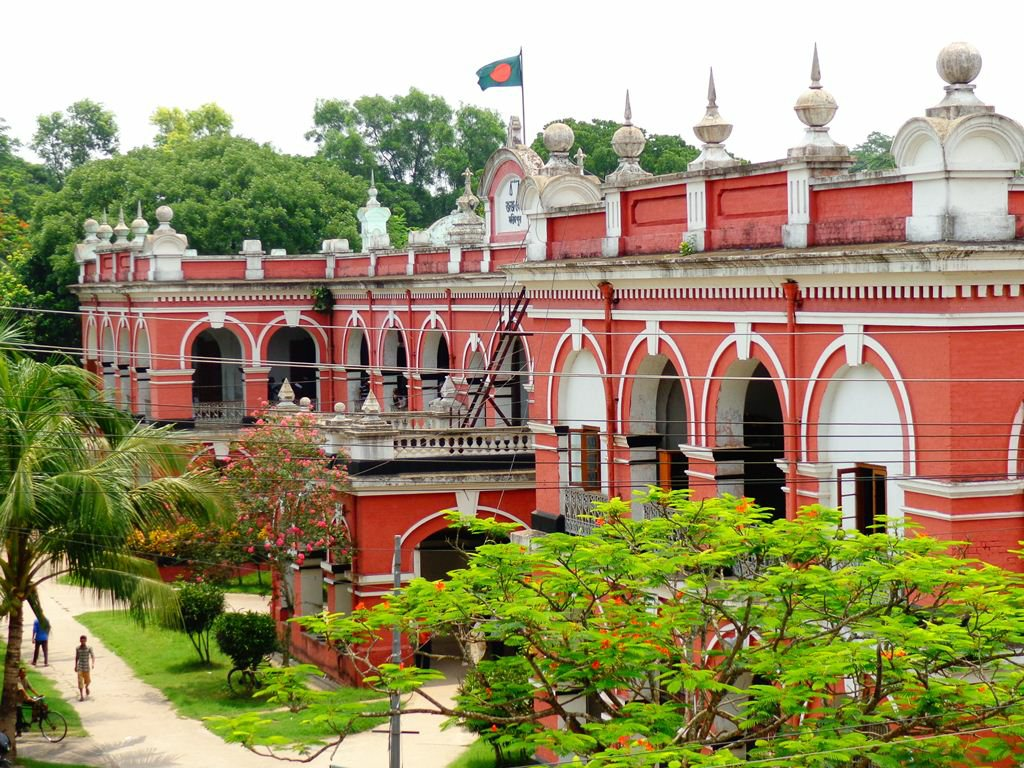
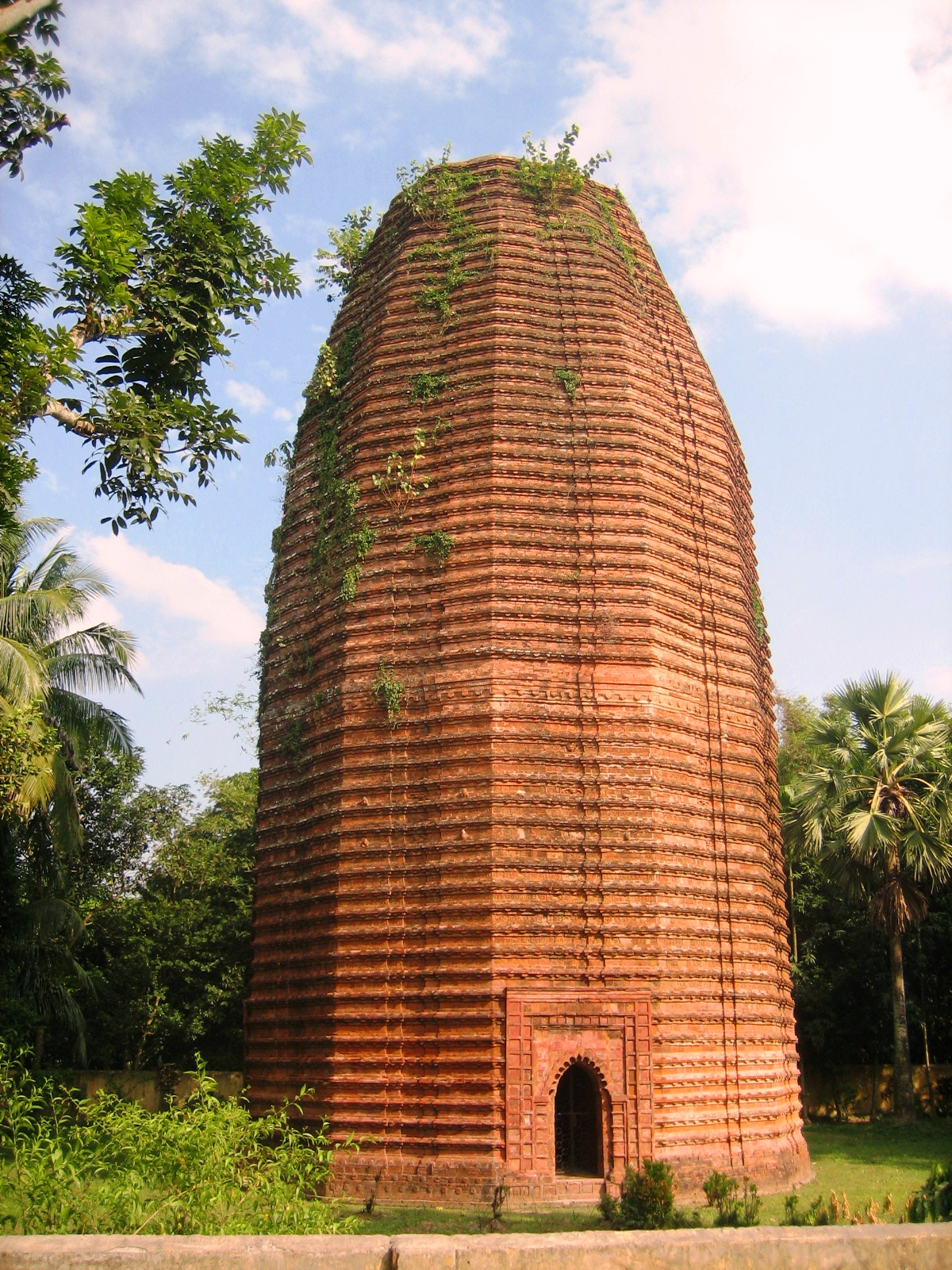
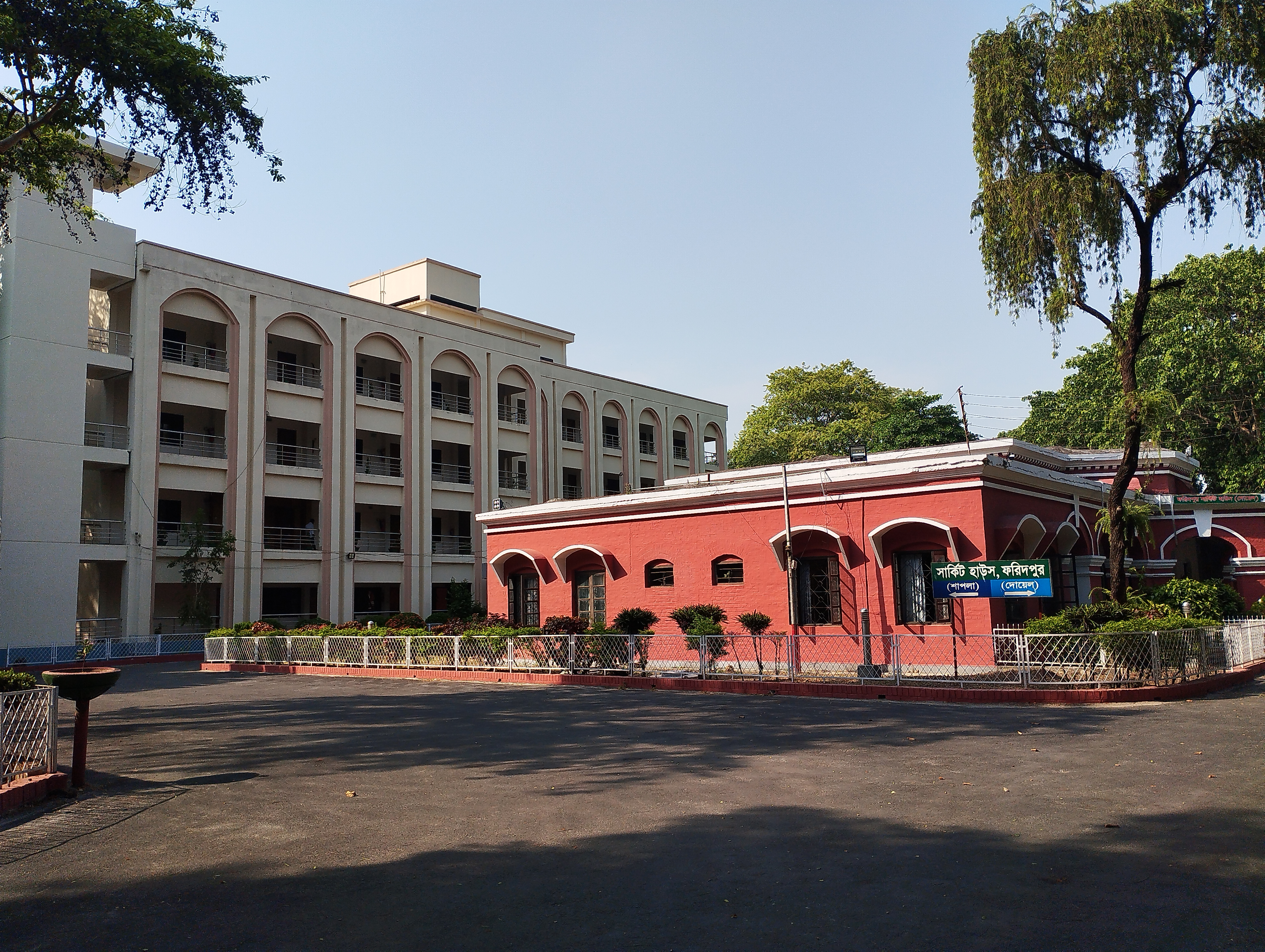
- Clockwise from top-left: Pathrail Mosque, Faridpur Judge Court, Faridpur Circuit House, Mathurapur Deul and Zamindar Shikdar Bari

- Location of Faridpur District in Bangladesh
- Interactive map of Faridpur District
- Coordinates: 23.50°N 89.83°E
- Country: Bangladesh
- Division: Dhaka
- Seat: Faridpur

Government
  - Deputy Commissioner: Mohammad Kamrul Hasan Molla
  - District Council Chairman: Md. Afzal Hossain Khan Palash
  - Chief Executive Officer: Md. Abdur Rashid

Area
  - Total: 2,052.86 km^{2} (792.61 sq mi)
- Elevation: 12 m (39 ft)

Population (2022)
  - Total: 2,162,879
  - Density: 1,053.59/km^{2} (2,728.79/sq mi)
- Demonym(s): Faridpuri, Foridpuira
- Postal code: 7800
- Area code: 0631
- ISO 3166 code: BD-15
- HDI (2023): 0.678 medium · 11th of 22
- Website: www.faridpur.gov.bd

Faridpur District (Bengali: ফরিদপুর জেলা) is a district in south-central Bangladesh. It is a part of Dhaka Division. It is bounded by the Padma River to the northeast. The district was named for its headquarters, the city of Faridpur, which itself was named for Farīd-ud-Dīn Masʿūd, a 13th-century Sufi saint. A separate district was created by severing Dhaka district in 1786 and was called Dacca Jelalpur. Separate Faridpur District was formed in 1815. Faridpur Municipality was established in 1869. Historically, the town was known as Fatehabad. It was also called Haveli Mahal Fatehabad.

== History ==
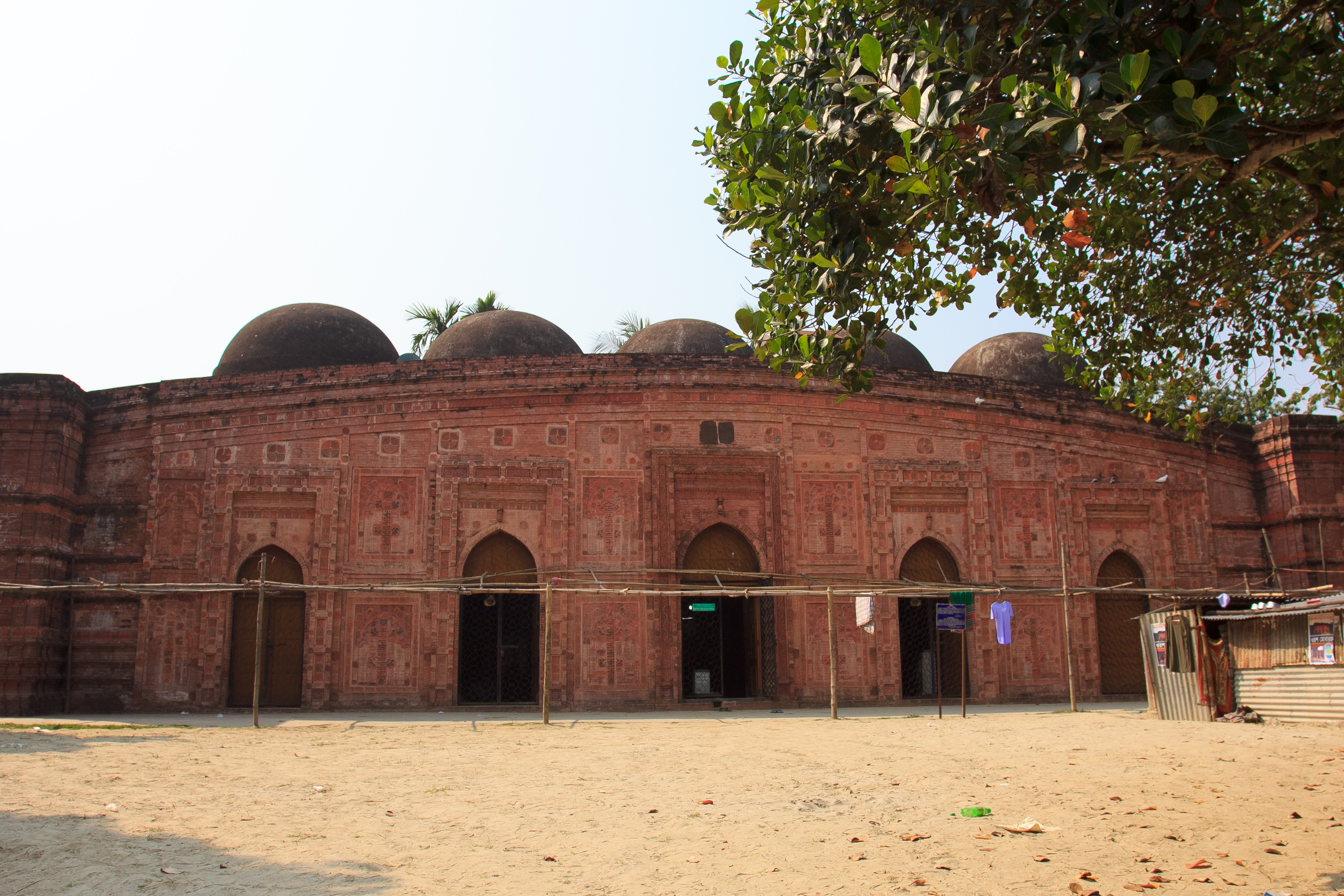
Pathrail Shahi Mosque in Bhanga Upazila

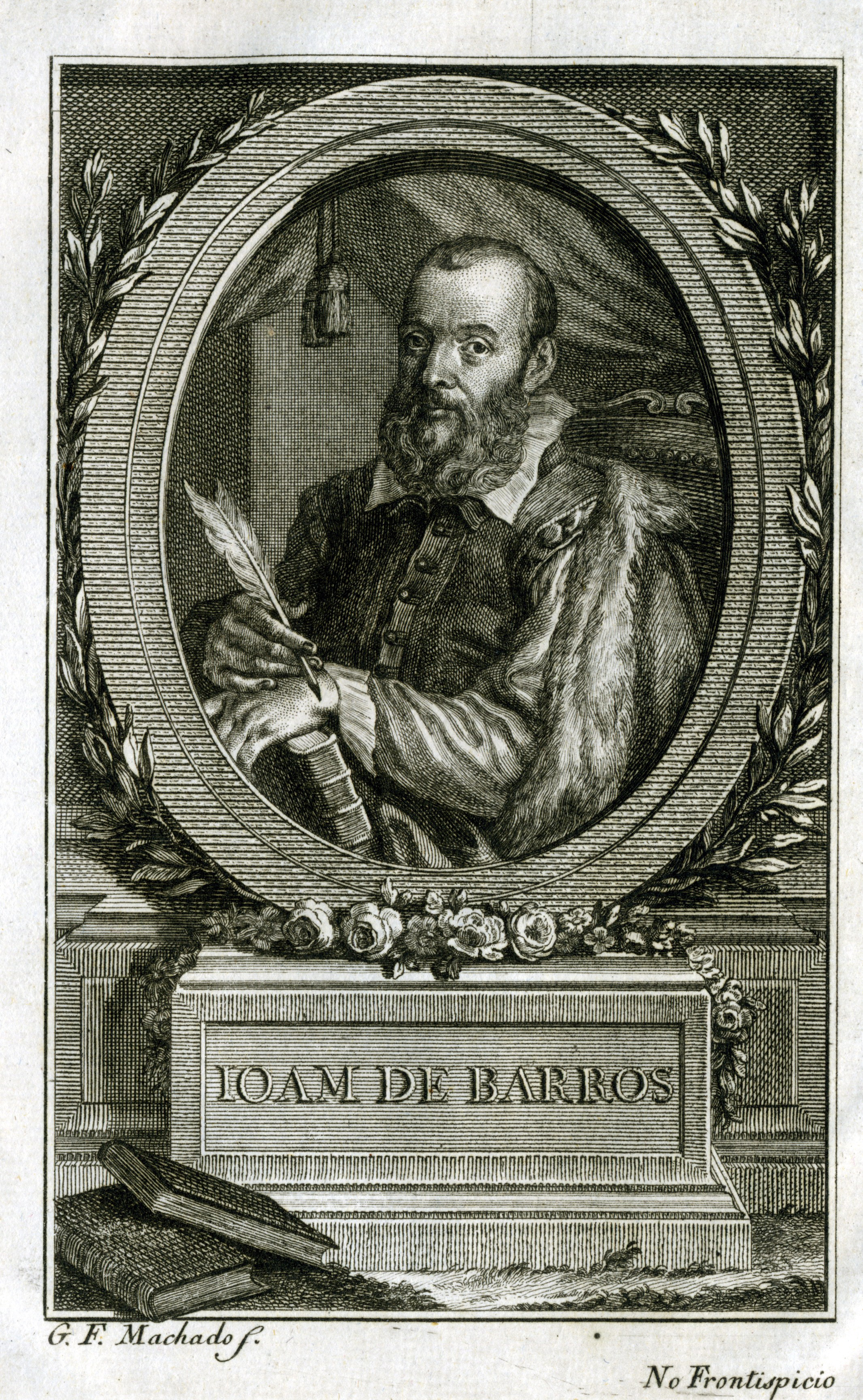
Portuguese historian João de Barros recorded Faridpur as Fatiabas in the 16th century

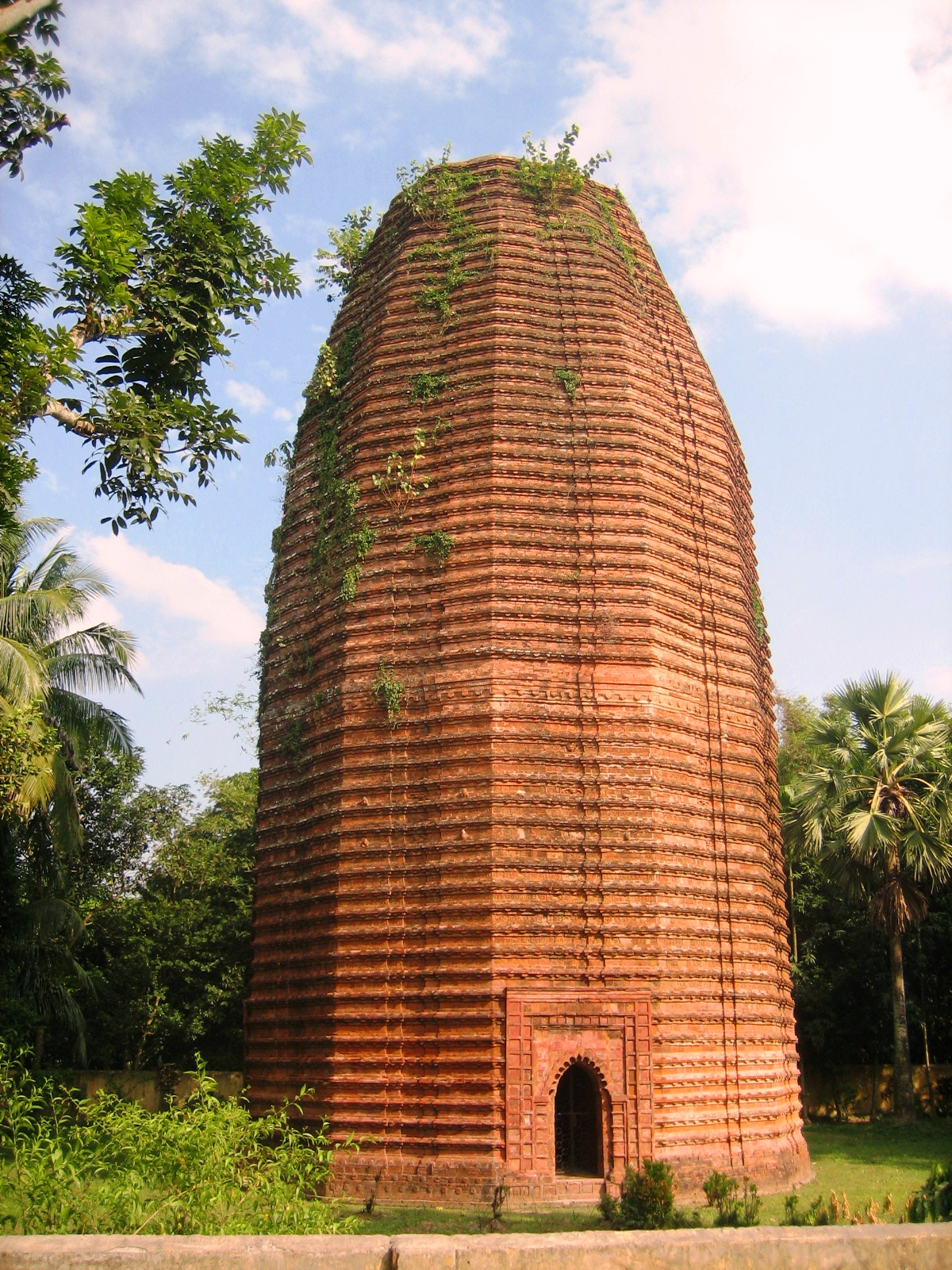
Mathurapur Deul in Madhukhali Upazila

The town of Fatehabad was located by a stream known as the Dead Padma, which was 32 kilometres (20 mi) from the main channel of the Padma River. Sultan Jalaluddin Muhammad Shah established a mint in Fatehabad during his reign in the early 15th century. Fatehabad continued to be a mint town of the Bengal Sultanate until 1538. In Ain-i-Akbari, it was named as Haweli Mahal Fatehabad during the reign of Emperor Akbar in the Mughal Empire. The Portuguese cartographer João de Barros mentioned it as Fatiabas. The Dutch map of Van den Brouck described it as Fathur.

Its first mention in Bengali literature was by Daulat Uzir Bahram Khan in his adaption of Layla and Majnun. The medieval poet Alaol was born in Faridpur.

Fathabad was a strategically important base in south and southwestern Bengal. It was a well-developed urban centre. The town was home to important Mughal government officials, including generals, civil servants and jagirdars. During the reign of Emperor Jahangir in the 17th century, local zamindars Satrajit and Mukund resisted the Mughal government. By the 19th century, the town was renamed as Faridpur in honour of the Sufi saint Shah Fariduddin Masud, a follower of the Chishti order of Ajmer. Haji Shariatullah and Dudu Miyan led the conservative Faraizi movement in Faridpur during the early 19th century.

The Faridpur District was established by the British in 1821. The Faridpur Subdivision was a part of Dacca Division in the Bengal Presidency established by the East India Company. The municipality of Faridpur was established in 1869. The subdivision covered modern day Faridpur, Rajbari, Madaripur, Shariatpur and Gopalganj districts (collectively known as Greater Faridpur). It was included in Eastern Bengal and Assam during the British Raj between 1905 and 1912.

Faridpur was a rail terminus for the Bengal Provincial Railway and the Eastern Bengal Railway, connecting Calcutta with the important Goalanda ghats, from where ships travelled to Colonial Assam and British Burma. Prominent zamindar families included the Amirabad Estate, Faridpur and Padamdi Nawab Estate. British Faridpur was the birthplace of several nationalist leaders of the subcontinent, including Ambica Charan Mazumdar, Humayun Kabir, Maulvi Tamizuddin Khan, Sheikh Mujibur Rahman, Syed Qumrul Islam Saleh Uddin, Syeda Sajeda Chowdhury and KM Obaidur Rahman.

The Doyen and sole pioneer of Progressive culture, literature and theatre of Bangladesh and teacher of Sheikh Mujibur Rahman at the Faculty of Law in Dhaka University, Natyaguru Nurul Momen, was born in Buraich of Alfadanga, now in Faridpur.

The American engineer Fazlur Rahman Khan was born in this region.

Faridpur saw intense fighting during the Bangladesh War in 1971. It was one of original 18 subdivisions of Bangladesh at the time of independence. In 1984, the pro-decentralization reforms of President Hussain Muhammad Ershad divided the old subdivision into five districts. In 2015, the Government of Bangladesh announced plans to establish Faridpur Division.

== Politics and local government ==
The district has 9 upazilas, 6 municipalities, 36 wards, 100 mahallahs, 79 unions and 1,899 villages. The district has four parliamentary constituencies in the Jatiyo Sangsad. The Faridpur District Council is the highest tier of local government.

=== List of upazilas ===
Faridpur District upazila geocode map

The district's nine upazilas:

- Alfadanga Upazila
- Bhanga Upazila
- Boalmari Upazila
- Charbhadrasan Upazila
- Faridpur Sadar Upazila
- Madhukhali Upazila
- Nagarkanda Upazila
- Sadarpur Upazila
- Saltha Upazila

== Demographics ==
Historical population
| Year | Pop. | ±% p.a. |
|---|---|---|
| 1974 | 1,120,031 | — |
| 1981 | 1,314,004 | +2.31% |
| 1991 | 1,505,686 | +1.37% |
| 2001 | 1,756,470 | +1.55% |
| 2011 | 1,912,969 | +0.86% |
| 2022 | 2,162,879 | +1.12% |

According to the 2022 Census of Bangladesh, Faridpur District had 525,877 households and a population of 2,162,879. The population density was 1,054 people per km^{2}. Faridpur District had a literacy rate (age 7 and over) of 72.13%, compared to the national average of 74.80%, and a sex ratio of 1059 females per 1000 males. 415,692 (19.22%) inhabitants were under 10 years of age. Approximately, 23.83% of the population lived in urban areas. The ethnic population was 6,452, mainly Malo and Banai.

Religions in Faridpur District (2022)
| Religion | Percent |
| Islam | 91.50% |
| Hinduism | 8.44% |
| Other or not stated | 0.06% |

Religion in present-day Faridpur district
| | 1941 (Note: 1941 figures are for the Sadar subdivision of Faridpur district and Alfadanga thana of Jessore district, which roughly corresponds to the present district.) | | 1981 | | 1991 | | 2001 | | 2011 | | 2022 | |
| Religion | Pop. | % | Pop. | % | Pop. | % | Pop. | % | Pop. | % | Pop. | % |
|---|---|---|---|---|---|---|---|---|---|---|---|---|
| Islam | 481,583 | 69.28% | 1,117,425 | 85.04% | 1,324,905 | 87.99% | 1,576,713 | 89.77% | 1,731,133 | 90.49% | 1,979,011 | 91.50% |
| Hinduism | 212,822 | 30.62% | 195,410 | 14.87% | 178,919 | 11.88% | 178,354 | 10.15% | 180,366 | 9.43% | 182,561 | 8.44% |
| Others (Note: Including Jainism, Christianity, Buddhism, Zoroastrianism, Judaism, Ad-Dharmis, or not stated) | 738 | 0.11% | 1,169 | 0.09% | 1,862 | 0.13% | 1,403 | 0.08% | 1,470 | 0.08% | 1,307 | 0.06% |
| Total Population | 695,143 | 100% | 1,314,004 | 100% | 1,505,686 | 100% | 1,756,470 | 100% | 1,912,969 | 100% | 2,162,879 | 100% |

Muslims are the majority population with 91.50%, while Hindus are 8.44%. The Hindu population decreased from 1.95 lakh in 1981 to just over 1.8 lakh today. The majority of Hindus in the district now are Namasudras. There is a minority of around 1,000 Christians in the district, nearly all living in Faridpur.

== Economy ==
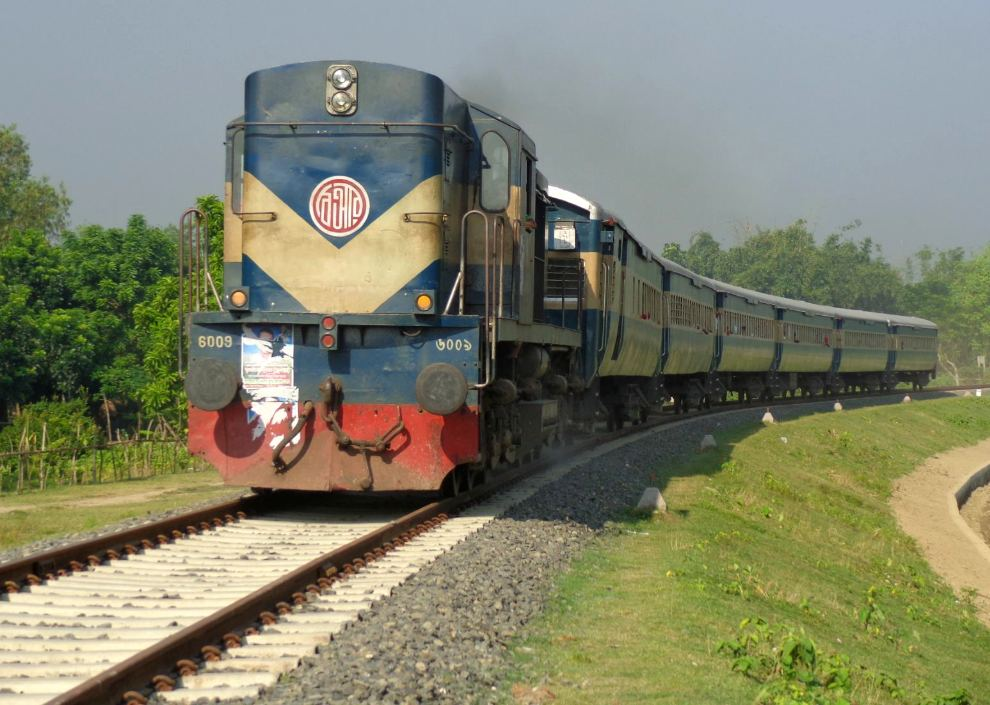
The Faridpur Express of the Bangladesh Railway

Faridpur is an important centre of the jute trade and hilsa fish trade. Its industrial sector features numerous jute mills, sugar mills and a 50 MW thermal power plant.

In terms of transport, Faridpur is an important hub of the Bangladesh Railway, with its tracks connected to the Indian Railways in West Bengal. It is linked by road with Kushtia, Meherpur, Khulna, Barisal, and Jessore.

== Culture and sport ==
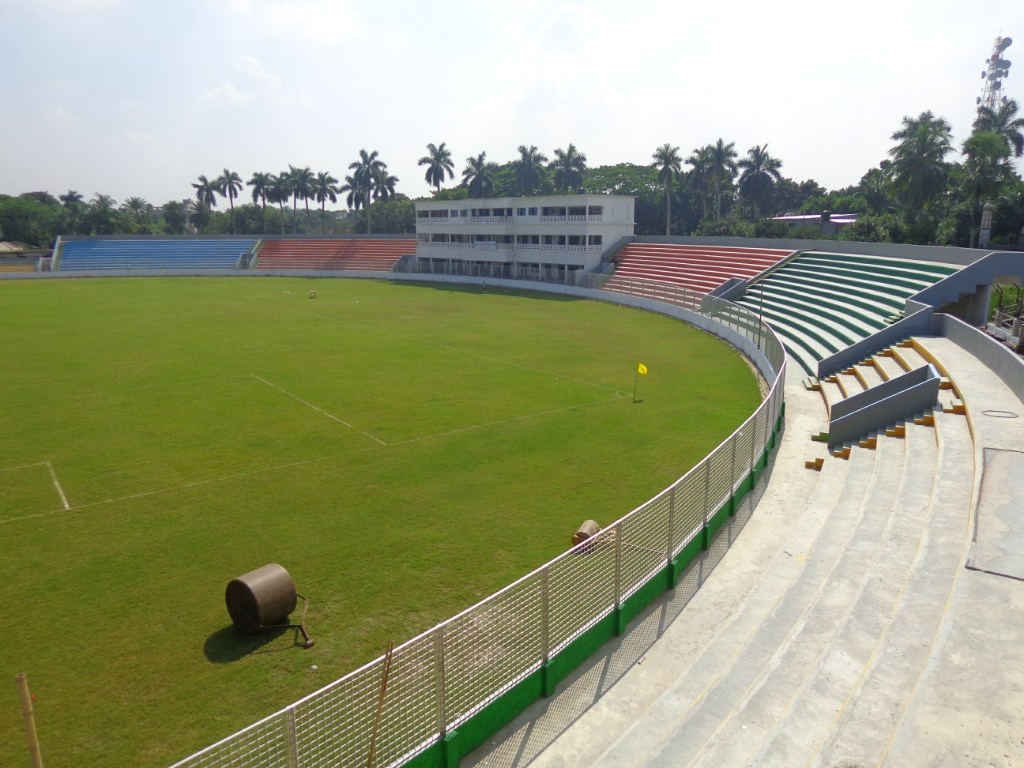
Faridpur Stadium

Faridpur District has a rich heritage of Folk music, including Baul, Marami, Bichar, Murshidi-Marfati, Fakirali, Gazirgan, Kabigan, Jarigan music. However many of these traditions are extinct. Major festivals include Eid, Nabanna, Pous Utshab, Rathjatra, Dol Purnima Utshab and Durga Puja. Folk festivities are held on the occasion of Annaprashana, Muharram, Bengali weddings, Jamai Shasthi, Bhadra Mangal Chandi. Folk games of the district include Dariabandha, boat racing, Ha-du-du and cock fighting.

Major contemporary and historical publications include Jagaran, Ganaman (1370 BS), Chashi Barta, Idaning, Thikana, Bhorer Runner, Faridpur (1997), Kumar (2006); Weekly: Kalbhabna (2004), Pragotir Din (1995), Boalmari Sangbad, Al Helal, Bhanga Khabar; Fortnightly: Nazir Bangla Defunct: Faridpur Darpan (1861), Chitrakar (1283 BS), Kohinoor (1896), Sanjay (1900), Aryakayastha (1318 BS), Faridpur Hitoishi (1329 BS), Faridpur Angina (1329 BS), Barta (1926), Muazzen (1335 BS), The Servant of Humanity (1960), Siraj (1932), Langal (1932), Sheba (1350 BS), Khedmat (1373 BS), Jubashakti (1972), Weekly Bangladesh (1972), Satyajug (1975), Faridpur Barta (1979), Aakal (1979), Samachar (1980) and Bangla Sangbad (1982).

== Education ==
There are several state owned colleges in the district. Several venerable British Raj-era educational institutions are located in the region, including the Yasin College (1968), Rajendra College (1918), Government Saroda Sundori Mohila College (1966) Faridpur Zilla School (1840), Talma Nazimuddin High School (1939), Faridpur Government Girls High School (1910), Madhukhali Pilot High School, George Academy (1911), M N Academy (1916), Bakiganj Islamia Madrasa (1922), Hitoishi High School (1889), Bhanga Pilot High School (1889), Karakdi Rambihari Multilateral High School (1901) and Krishnapur High School (1910), Faridpur Medical College (1985), Boalmari George Academy (1911), Faridpur Engineering College (2010), Faridpur High School (1889), Domrakadi Govt. Primary School (1919) and Domrakadi High School (1969), Brahmonkanda A.S. Academy (1987)

== See also ==
- Upazilas of Bangladesh
- Districts of Bangladesh
- Divisions of Bangladesh
