= Madhukhali Upazila =

Madhukhali মধুখালী
- Upazila
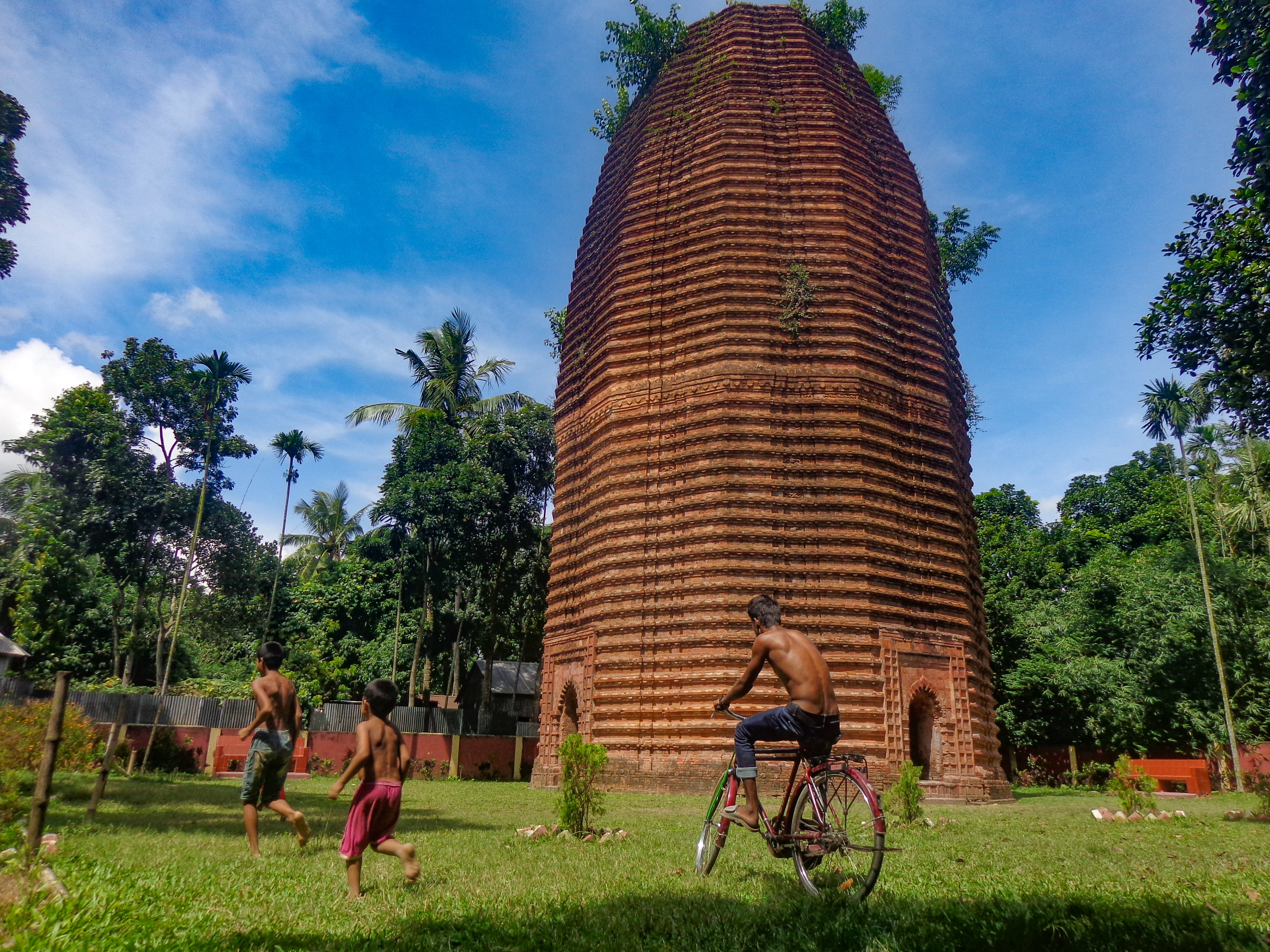
- Mathurapur Deul

- Coordinates: 23°32.5′N 89°37.8′E
- Country: Bangladesh
- Division: Dhaka
- District: Faridpur

Area
  - Total: 230.73 km^{2} (89.09 sq mi)

Population (2022)
  - Total: 231,997
  - Density: 1,005.5/km^{2} (2,604.2/sq mi)
- Time zone: UTC+6 (BST)
- Postal code: 7850
- Website: Official Map of Madhukhali

Madhukhali Upazila mauza geocode map

Madhukhali (Bengali: মধুখালী) is an upazila of Faridpur District in Dhaka Division, Bangladesh. Mathurapur village in Madhukhali has the 16th century ancient Mathurapur Deul and one of the 15 Sugar mills in Bangladesh.

== Geography ==
Madhukhali is located at 23.5417°N 89.6306°E. It has 45,939 households and a total area of 230.73 km^{2}.

== Demographics ==
Religions in Madhukhali Upazila (2022)
Religion	Percent
Islam	85.80%
Hinduism	14.18%
Other or not stated	0.02%

According to the 2022 Bangladeshi census, Madhukhali Upazila had 56,050 households and a population of 231,997. 9.56% of the population were under 5 years of age. Madhukhali had a literacy rate (age 7 and over) of 74.48%: 76.39% for males and 72.65% for females, and a sex ratio of 96.86 males for every 100 females. 44,192 (19.05%) lived in urban areas.

As of the 2011 Census of Bangladesh, Madhukhali upazila had 45,939 households and a population of 204,492. 45,649 (22.32%) were under 10 years of age. Madhukhali had an average literacy rate of 52.45%, compared to the national average of 51.8%, and a sex ratio of 1010 females per 1000 males. 13,410 (6.57%) of the population lived in urban areas.

As of the 1991 Bangladesh census, Madhukhali had a population of 165,438. Males constituted 51.29% of the population, and females 48.71%. The population aged 18 or over was 83,075. Madhukhali has an average literacy rate of 32.5% (7+ years), compared to the national average of 32.4%.

== Administration ==
Madhukhali Upazila is divided into nine union parishads: Bagat, Dumain, Gazna, Jahapur, Kamarkhali, Madhukhali, Megchami, Nowpara, and Raipur. The union parishads are subdivided into 129 mauzas and 242 villages.

== See also ==
- Upazilas of Bangladesh
- Districts of Bangladesh
- Divisions of Bangladesh
- Administrative geography of Bangladesh
