= Amirabad Estate, Faridpur =

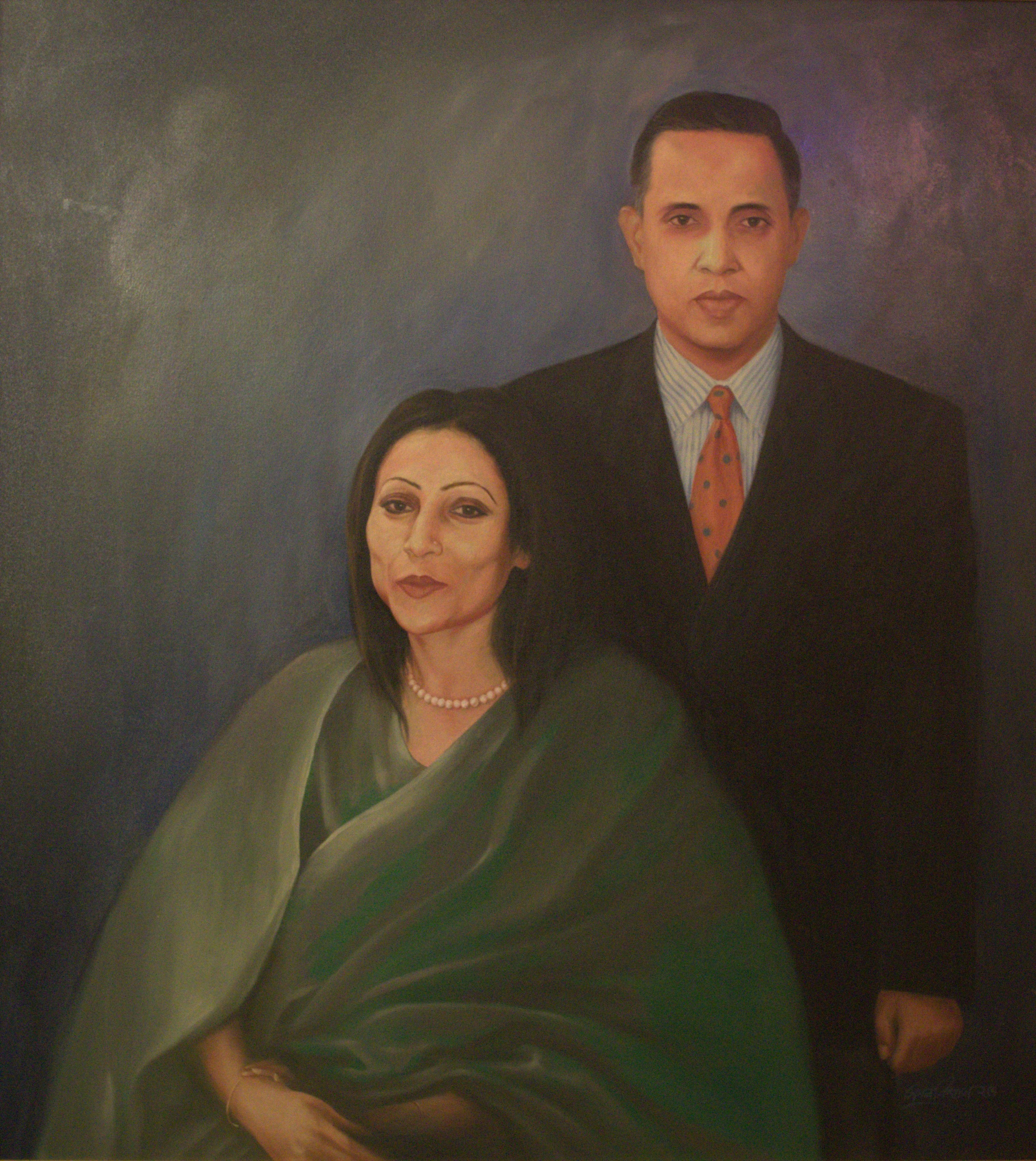
Painting of Kamran Hossain Chowdhury, a scion of Amirabad and member of parliament representing Faridpur, and his wife Shusmita Amin Chowdhury

The Telihati-Amirabad Estate (Note: Telihati was the Mughal-era name of the area. Amirabad became the name by 1908 due to a railway station. Telihati Amirabad was the official name of the estate which is recorded in the Bengal District Gazette on Faridpur which was published in 1925 and written by Lewis Sydney Steward O'Malley, an officer of the Imperial Civil Service in British India. Telihati Amirabad was listed as the largest estate in Faridpur District. It was ranked first among the ten largest private estates in the district.) was the largest zamindar estate in Faridpur District, Bengal, British India. Within colonial-era Greater Faridpur (that included the present-day districts of Faridpur, Rajbari, Gopalganj, Shariatpur and Madaripur), the estate covered 72,000 acres of land. The estate owned lands outside Faridpur, including landholdings across the Bengal Presidency, Eastern Bengal and Assam (1905–1912), The Punjab and Arabia. The family of the estate has been an important political family which has produced members of the Bengal Legislative Council, the Bengal Legislative Assembly, the Constituent Assembly of Pakistan, the National Assembly of Pakistan and the Parliament of Bangladesh.

The family of the estate carry the title and surname of Chowdhury. They were locally described as Biswas. The legacy of the estate lives on in the name of the Amirabad railway station of the Bangladesh Railway in Faridpur, Bangladesh. The estate also has a rich architectural legacy, including the mansion of Moyez Manzil, the grounds of Biswas Bari and other hamlets.

== Etymology ==
The estate's recorded name is Telihati Amirabad. The name Telihati appears as a name for the area in the Mughal period. Telihati was an administrative unit of Fatehabad district (present-day Faridpur) under Mughal rule. By the 20th century, the name Amirabad became prevalent. The name is linked to the Zamindar Amir Ali Chowdhury. Amir is an Arabic word meaning "ruler". The Persian suffix -abad may imply a realm, city or province. Amirabad hence translates as "realm of the ruler". In 1967, the historian N. K. Sinha noted the prevalence of zamindar lineages in the area dating from the decline of the Mughal Empire.

== Geography ==
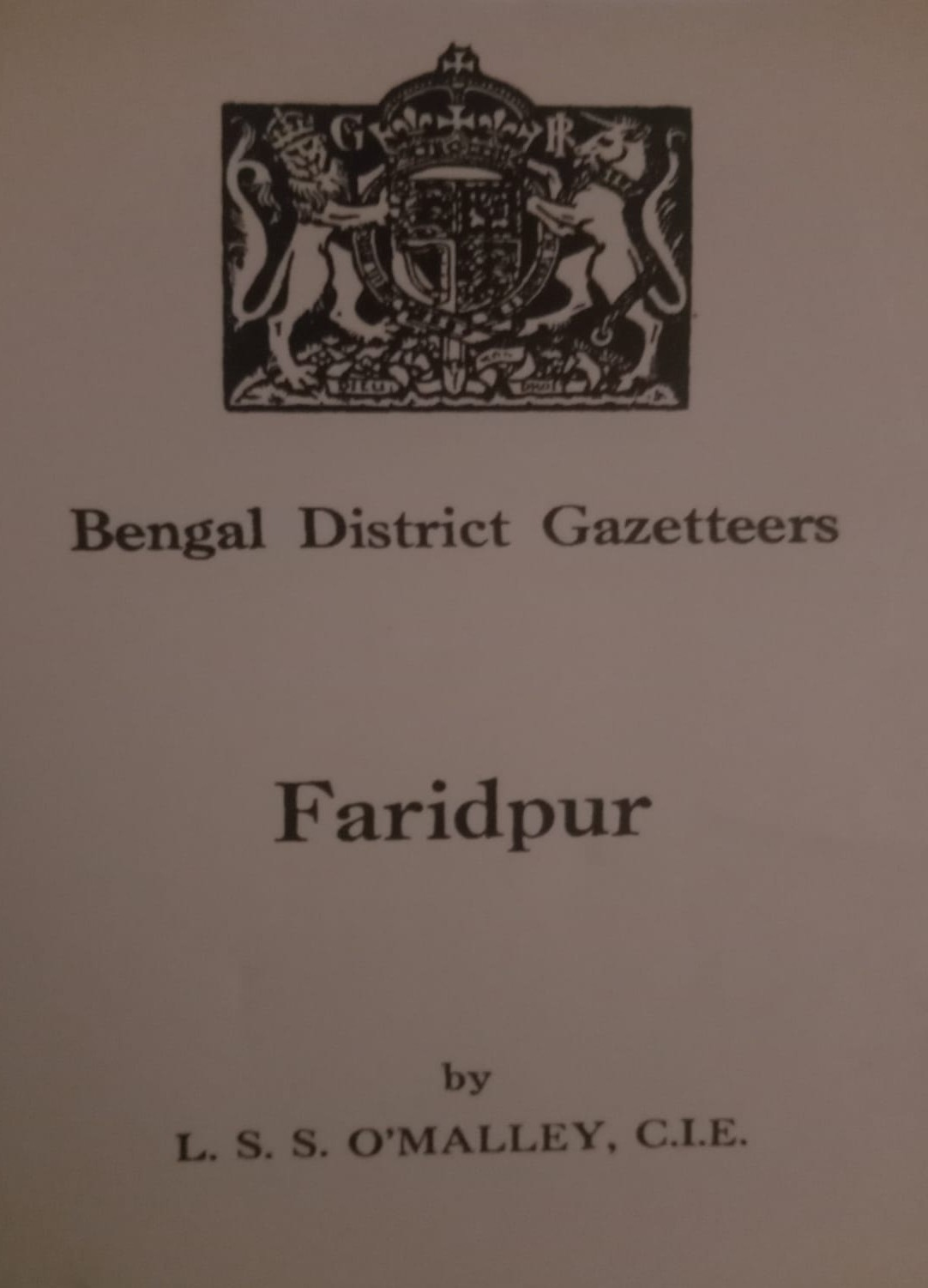
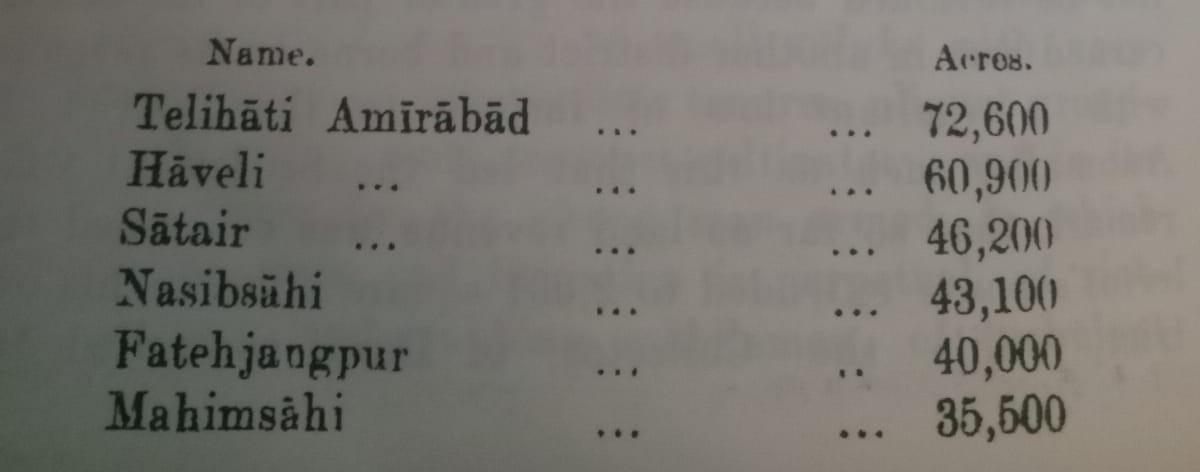
According to the Bengal District Gazette in 1925, Telihati Amirabad was the largest private estate in colonial-era Faridpur District.

According to the district gazette published by the colonial British anthropologist Lewis Sydney Steward O'Malley, the Telihati-Amirabad Estate was the largest private estate in all of Faridpur (including Faridpur proper, Rajbari, Gopalganj, Shariatpur and Madaripur). It had 72,000 acres within the colonial district of Faridpur alone. The estate included geographically non-contiguous land, with pockets of landholdings spread across the district and outside the district. The estate was divided into four branches. According to O'Malley, "on the average, each estate is divided into five villages". In the case of Amirabad, four households were shareholders of the estate system of the Zamindari. A railway station of the Eastern Bengal Railway was established in Amirabad. The first railway from Rajbari to Faridpur was built in 1899.

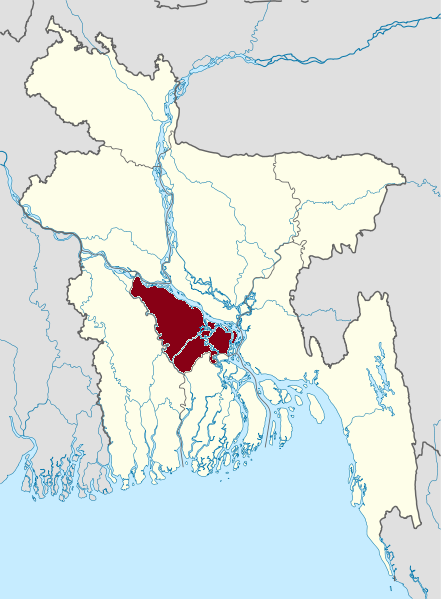
Greater Faridpur in a map of modern Bangladesh

The estate's lands outside Faridpur were considerable. In 1923, the estate covered 4,000 km^{2} of territory in the Bengal Presidency. It was one of the ten largest estates in British Bengal with landholdings in Faridpur, Rajbari, Madaripur, Shariatpur, Gopalganj, Manikganj, Mymensingh, Pabna, Gazipur, Rangpur, Dacca, Calcutta and 24 Parganas. It also owned some landholdings in The Punjab region of North India and the Hejaz region of Arabia. The core property of the family was in the Faridpur and Rajbari regions, particularly along the banks of the Padma River (the main distributary of the Ganges). The estate covered extensive farmland and many deltaic islands. The estate measured 1 million acres by the time of its demise after the partition of India. It included parts of both East Bengal and West Bengal. According to the family historian Chowdhury Abd-Allah Quaseed, the estate covered 2.6% of the territory of Bangladesh and 1.65% of the territory of undivided Bengal.

=== Comparison with princely states ===
The estate can be compared with the smallest princely states in British India. The smallest princely states in western India, including Veja-no-ness State, Bhadli and Nahara State, covered a few square kilometers and generated 500 rupees in taxes. In comparison, the Amirabad Estate was geographically larger and more populous. The village of Amirabad alone was estimated to have generated 2,500 rupees in tax revenue for the Bengal government in 1913. Estates in Bengal under the Permanent Settlement were often wealthier and influential than some princely states.

== History ==
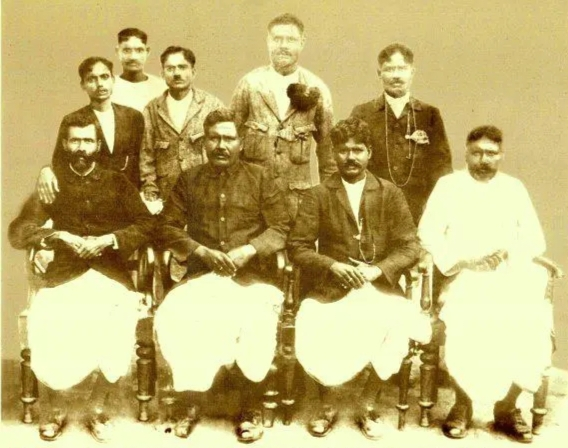
Zamindars of the estate circa 1899.

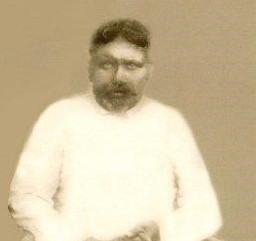
Chowdhury Moyezuddin Biwshash

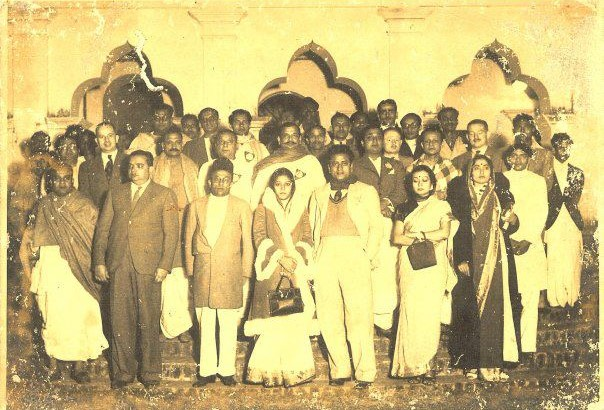
The All India Motion Pictures Conference was held at Moyez Manzil on 31 December 1934.

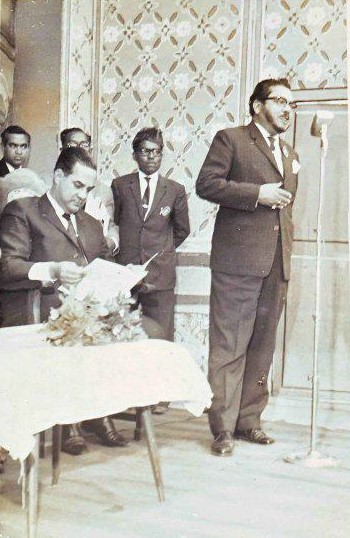
Chowdhury Abd-Allah Zaheeruddin

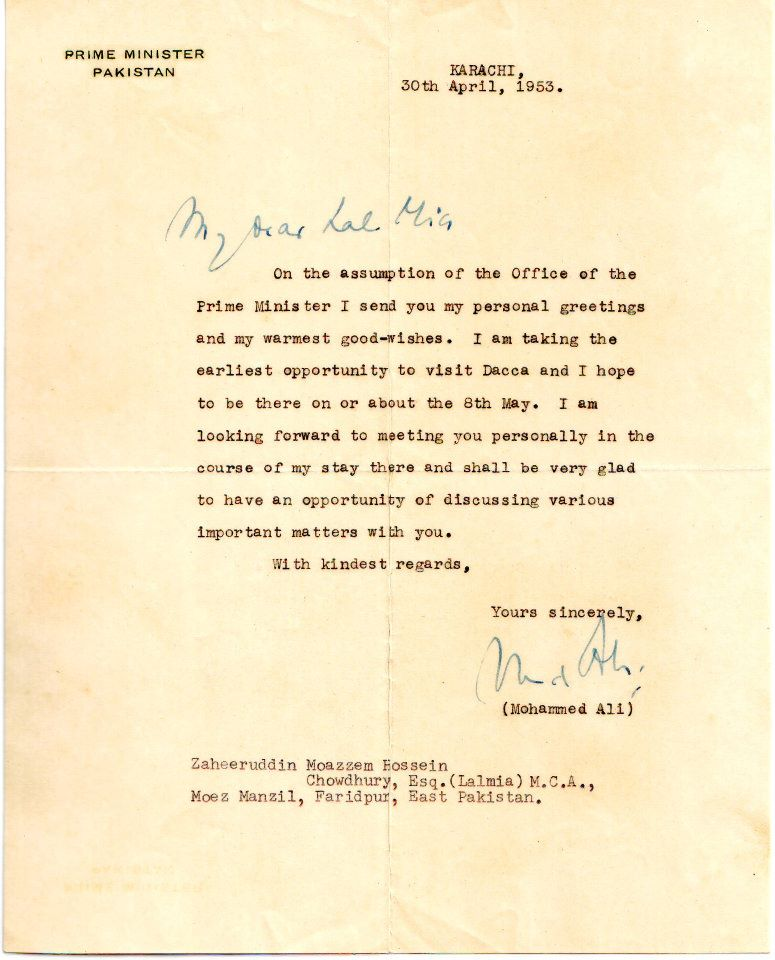
Letter from Mohammad Ali of Bogra to Lal Mia

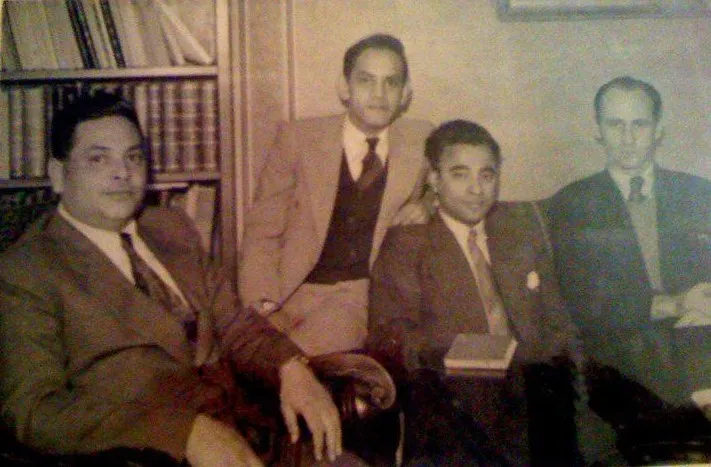
Yusuf Ali Chowdhury (first from left)

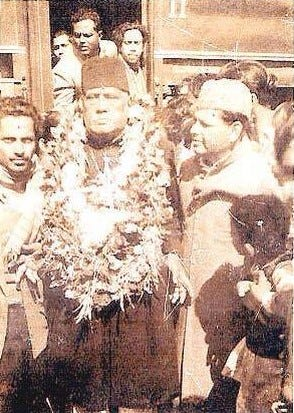
A. K. Fazlul Huq being welcomed by Mohan Mia

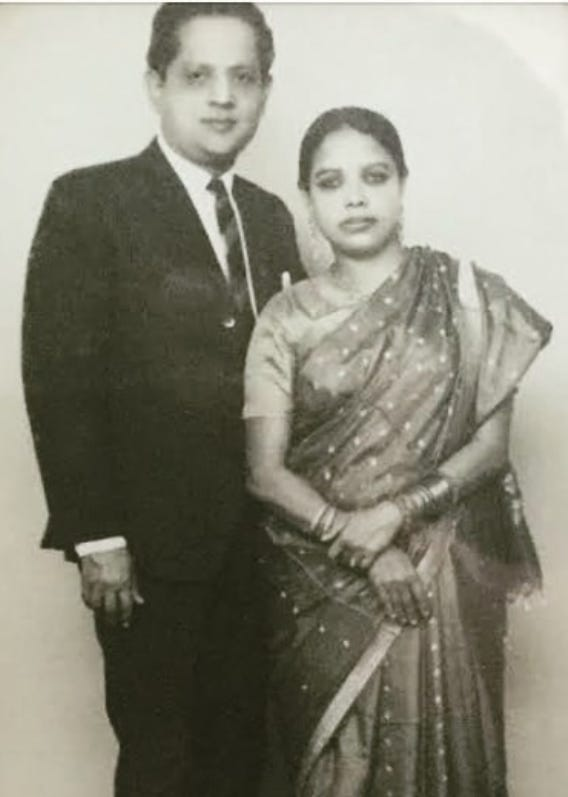
Shamsuddin Chowdhury and his wife Halima Chowdhury

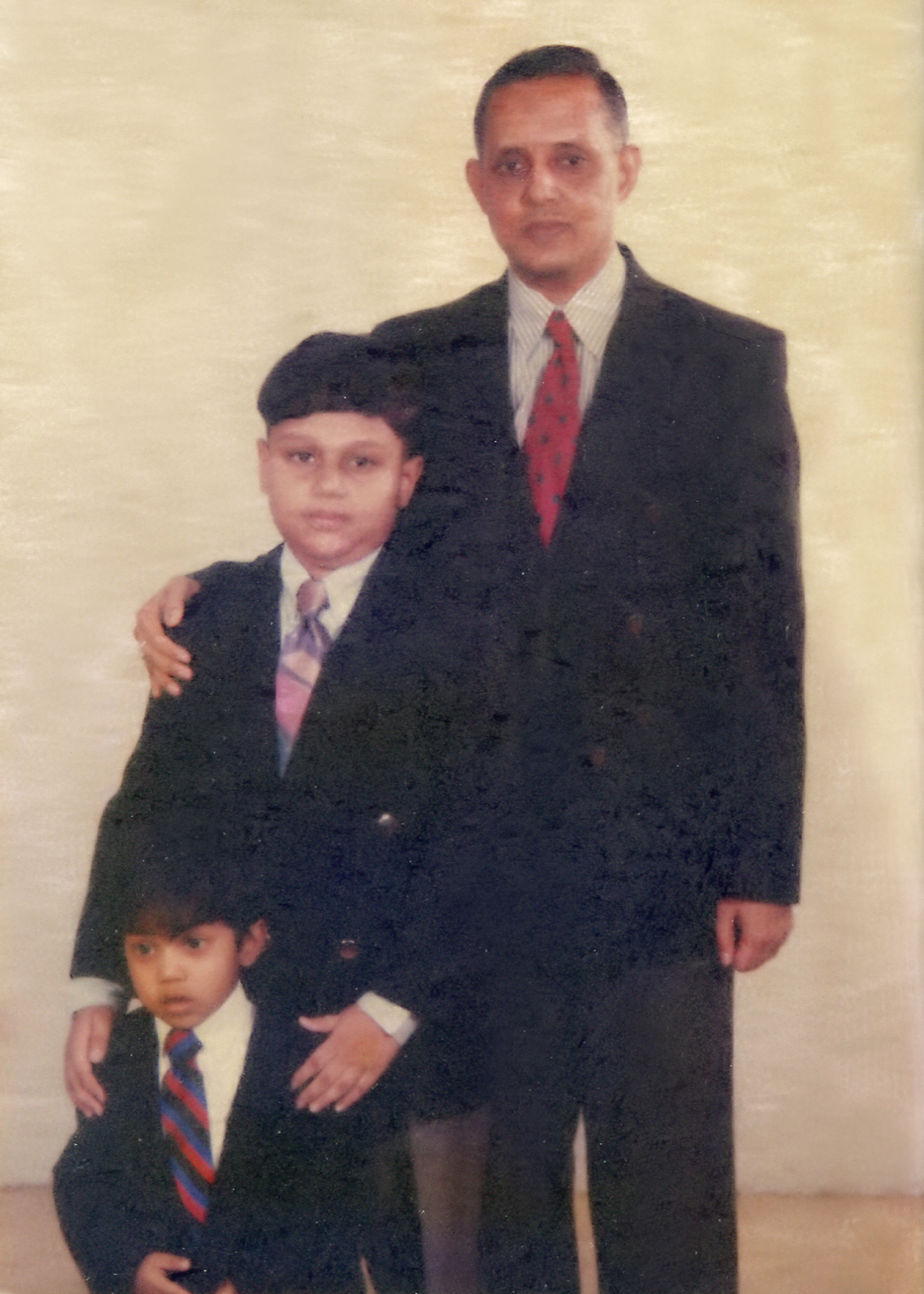
Kamran Hossain Chowdhury with his sons Umran and Ayman

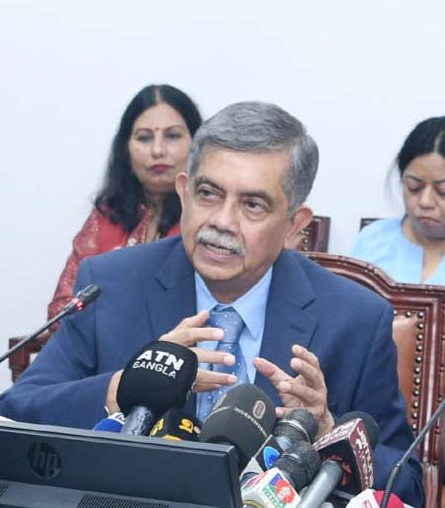
Chowdhury Rafiqul Abrar

Arafat Ali, a man from the Jaunpur Sultanate, settled in Fatehabad (the former name of Faridpur). Fatehabad was a mint town of the Bengal Sultanate. His family was given an endowment by the Mughal government to govern the northern part of Fatehabad. During the reign of Emperor Jahangir in the 17th century, the family became the jagirdars of the northern part of Fatehabad along the banks of the mighty Ganges. Fatehabad was a district of Mughal Bengal. According to a British scholar, Fatehabad was the name of a mint town of Hussain Shah, which has been identified with the town of Faridpur; it was also the name of a large sarkar or division, which is believed to have been named after Jalaluddin Fateh Shah, king of Bengal from 1481 to 1486. This sarkar included part of Faridpur and portions of Dacca and Bakarganj, as well as the islands of Dakhin Shahbazpur and Sandwip.

The name Telihati is mentioned as a historical administrative unit of Faridpur in the Mughal period. The area was fertile and a bastion of zamindar estates. According to N. K. Sinha, "In the suburb of Telihati Pargana of Faridpur, villages like Vabrasur served as early settlements for zamindar lineages migrating from central Bengal during the Mughal decline (late 17th–early 18th century). These areas were integrated into British revenue surveys post-1793".

During the British colonization of Bengal, the family resisted British expansion by deploying its private lathial army. The East India Company divided the Mughal endowment into 23 segments. 22 segments were auctioned off to newly created estates, including Hindu estates. The original Muslim family from the Mughal period retained a portion in Biswas Bari. In the 19th century, Chowdhury Moyezuddin Biwshash greatly expanded the estate through his own mercantile activities. He acquired land in other parts of Bengal, as well as in Punjab and Arabia. He built the Moyez Manzil in the main town of Faridpur. In Dhaka, the family owned property which was sold to the French East India Company which in turn sold it to the Dhaka Nawab Family; the Ahsan Manzil stands on the site of the former French factory. The family was responsible for promoting many development works in Faridpur, including the introduction of electricity, cinema, a modern water supply; building roads, bridges, and schools; improving rail communications; and safeguarding Bengali Muslim culture and civil rights. The Amirabad railway station was named in honor of Amir Ali Chowdhury.

In 1881, the family supported the formation of the People's Association of Faridpur, which was the first organized political party in what is now Bangladesh. Chowdhury Moyezuddin Biwshash and Ambica Charan Mazumdar were the founders of the People's Association of Faridpur. They later supported the Indian National Congress which was founded in 1885. After the first partition of Bengal, the estate fell under the short-lived province of Eastern Bengal and Assam.

In 1908, the area was surveyed by the British government. The survey report stated that "Amirabad mauza [village tract] borders the Telihati pargana to the north; surveyed in 1908, showing alluvial soil suitable for multiple cropping. Population density: 1,040 per sq. mile". In 1913, Amirabad was mentioned in the district gazette of L. S. S. O'Malley. The description was given as "Amirabad (village in Faridpur Sadar thana): Population 1,248 (1911 census); area 1,200 acres; chief crops: rice and pulses. Lies 8 miles southeast of Faridpur town, near the Kumar River; notable for a small mosque (built c. 1800) and as a minor trade post for jute. Revenue assessment: Rs. 2,500 annually under zamindari tenure". The estate owned vast lands around the Goalundo Ghat which was the main river port connecting eastern and western Bengal.

In 1925, the Amirabad Estate was ranked as the largest private estate in all of Faridpur by the Bengal District Gazette written by the renowned colonial scholar Lewis Sydney Steward O'Malley. The estate had a population of several thousand people with considerable landholdings within and outside Faridpur. O'Malley noted that the district was remarkable for the great number of independent estates at the time of the Permanent Settlement in 1793.

By the 1930s, the family began to move away from the Congress towards the All India Muslim League following the path taken by Muhammad Ali Jinnah after Hindu-Muslim unity broke down. Chowdhury Abd-Allah Zaheeruddin became a member of the Bengal Legislative Council in 1932. The Moyez Manzil hosted gatherings of the All India Literary Conference, All India Motion Pictures Conference, Bengal Education Policy Conference, All India Nationalist Muslim Conference, All India Muslim League and All India Congress Committee. Yusuf Ali Chowdhury was the Chairman of the Faridpur District Board between 1938 and 1953. He was concurrently a member of the Bengal Legislative Assembly and later a member of the East Bengal Legislative Assembly and Constituent Assembly of Pakistan. Chowdhury played a key role in the land reforms which saw the enactment of the East Bengal State Acquisition and Tenancy Act of 1950. Despite being a zamindar himself, Chowdhury supported the redistribution of wealth and land.

In 1954, Biswas Bari hosted A. K. Fazlul Huq and Huseyn Shaheed Suhrawardy during the United Front election campaign. Leaders from the family led efforts to build schools, roads and bridges in Faridpur. During the Bangladesh Liberation War in 1971, the grounds of the estate suffered raids and at least 10 people were killed in the hamlet of Chandpur. Land reforms after the creation of Bangladesh ended all traces of the zamindari system. The Bangladesh Land Holding Limitation Order 1972 restricted a single family from owning more than 100 bighas of land. On 29 April 1976, farmland nationalized by the state was returned to private owners through the Alienation of Land Ordinance. The family recovered many of plots land with the restoration of property rights.

After decentralization reforms of the Bangladeshi government in 1984, Faridpur was divided into five districts, including Rajbari, Shariatpur, Madaripur, Faridpur proper, and Gopalganj. The upazila system of local government was also established. Imran Hossain Chowdhury became the first elected chairman of Faridpur Sadar Upazila in 1985. Kamran Hossain Chowdhury represented Faridpur in the 4th Parliament of Bangladesh; he was also the Chairman of Faridpur District Council with the rank and status of a deputy minister. In the 1980s, the estate was visited by Bangladeshi prime ministers Moudud Ahmed, Mizanur Rahman Chowdhury, and Kazi Zafar Ahmed during the presidency of Hussain Muhammad Ershad. Chowdhury Kamal Ibne Yusuf represented Faridpur in the 2nd, 5th, 6th, 7th and 8th parliaments; he was also a cabinet minister from the Bangladesh Nationalist Party.

== Railway ==
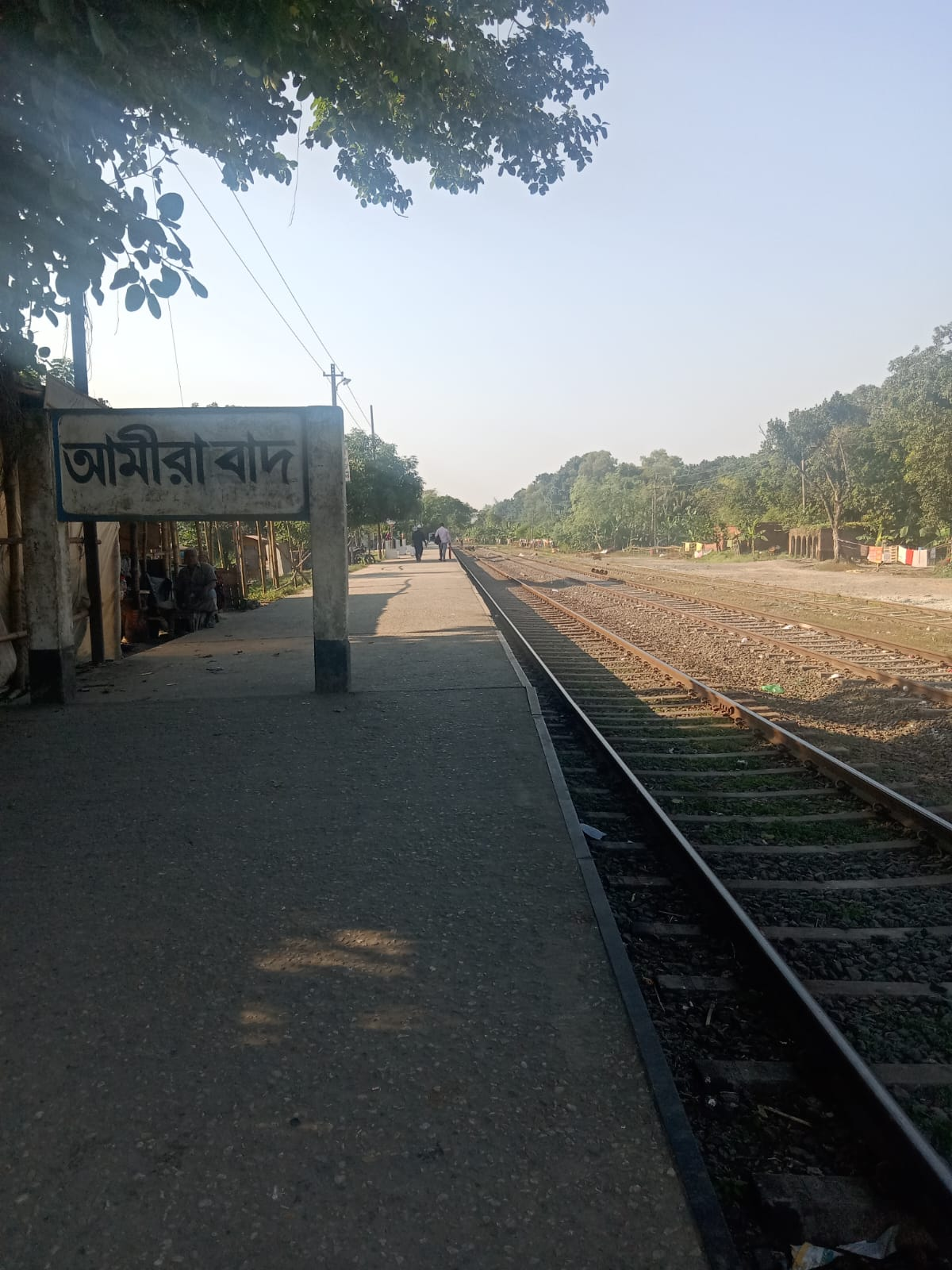
The Amirabad railway station of the Bangladesh Railway

Railways were introduced to Bengal in 1854. The Eastern Bengal Railway was established in 1862. By the end of the 19th century, rail tracks connected Faridpur with Calcutta and Dacca. The Amirabad Railway Station was established on the grounds of the estate. It was the last stop before trains reached Goalundo Ghat where passengers boarded ferries to cross the Padma River. At Goalundo, ships carried passengers as far away as Assam and British Burma. Goalundo's role as a shipping hub increased the importance of the Amirabad Estate and railway station. A wooden pavilion on the grounds of the estate is made of Burmese timber, which was among the most expensive timber at the time. The timber was likely brought to Faridpur on boats which disembarked at Goalundo Ghat. Trains then transported Burmese timber to other places. The ghat had shipping links with Chittagong and Arakan.

== Architecture and art ==
The estate has a rich architectural legacy. In Biswas Bari once stood a 172-room mansion which was burnt down during a fireworks accident. Moyez Manzil is a zamindar house which was completed in 1885. It was built at a cost of 1,100,000 rupees. It is an early example of Indo-Saracenic architecture. The building once had jharoka balconies. Other buildings of the estate also reflect the architectural heritage of the region. The estate is notable for its woodwork. A wooden pavilion still stands in Biswas Bari, Amirabad. The pavilion is known as the Baithak Khana, or "meeting place". Large wooden four pole beds, with intricately carved sculptures of angels and fairies, are also a hallmark of the art of the estate. Wooden doors and beds from the buildings of the estate can be found in the Bangladesh National Museum.

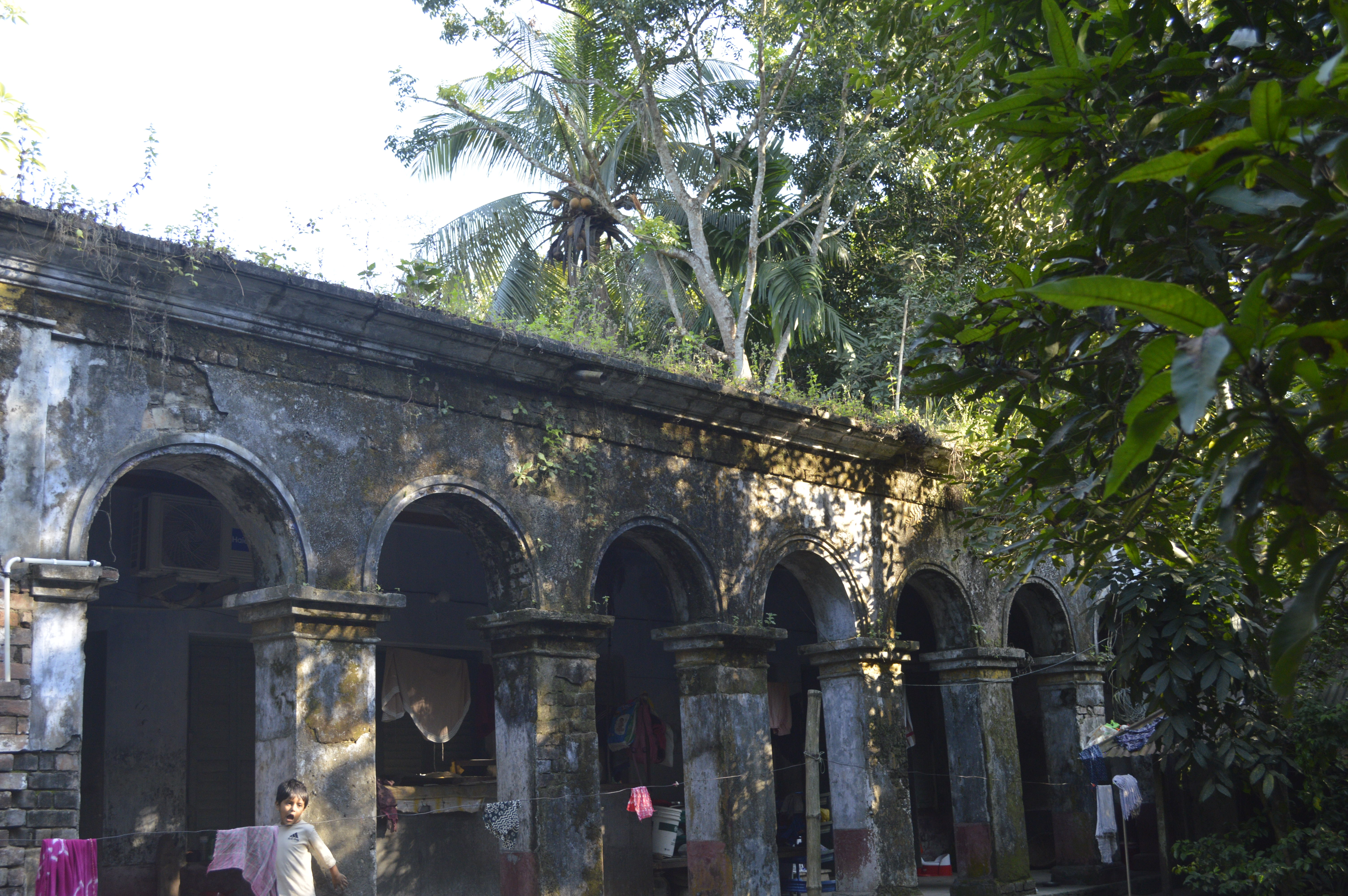
Ruins of a zamindar house

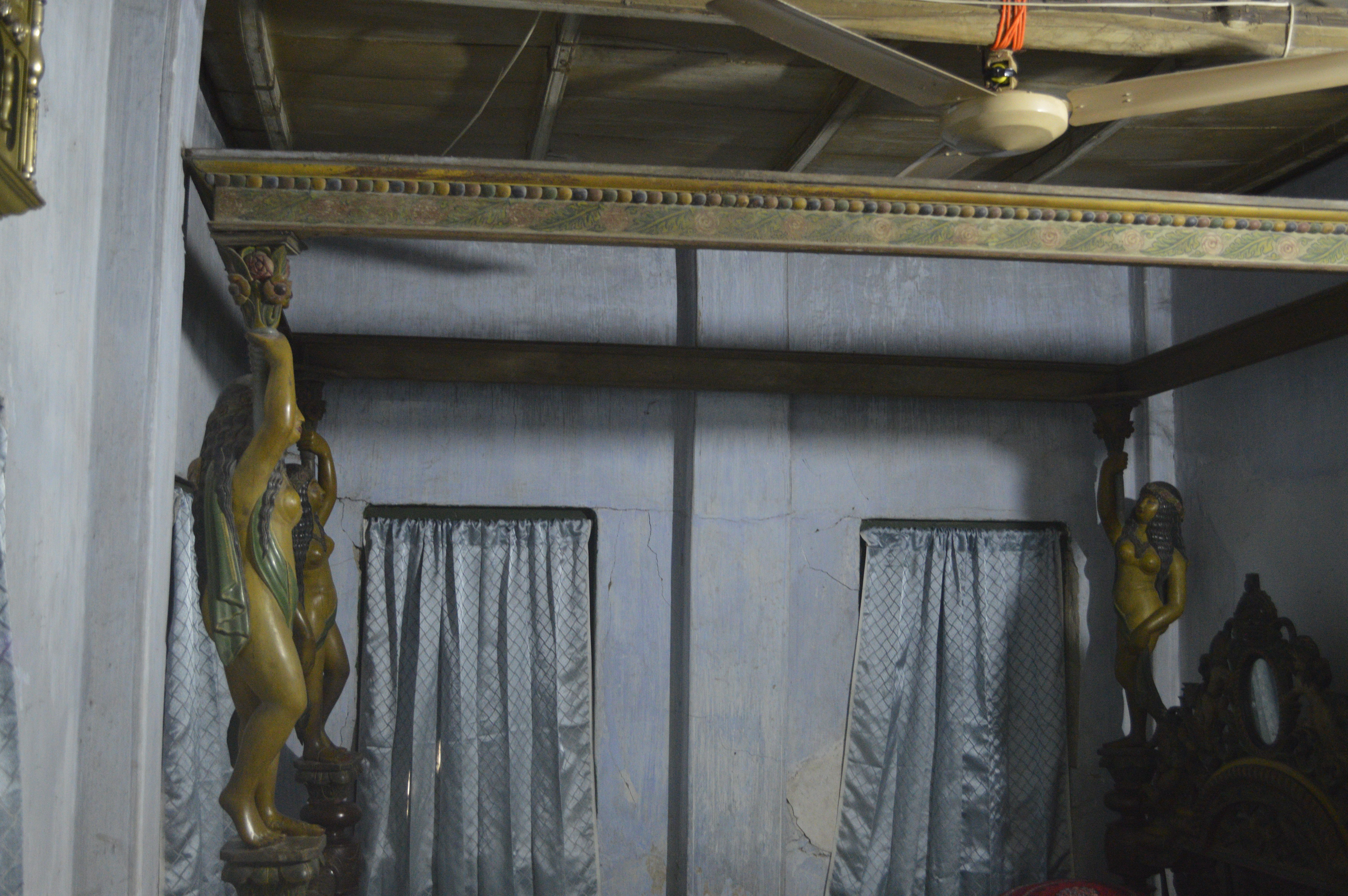
19th century zamindar's bed with female figurines

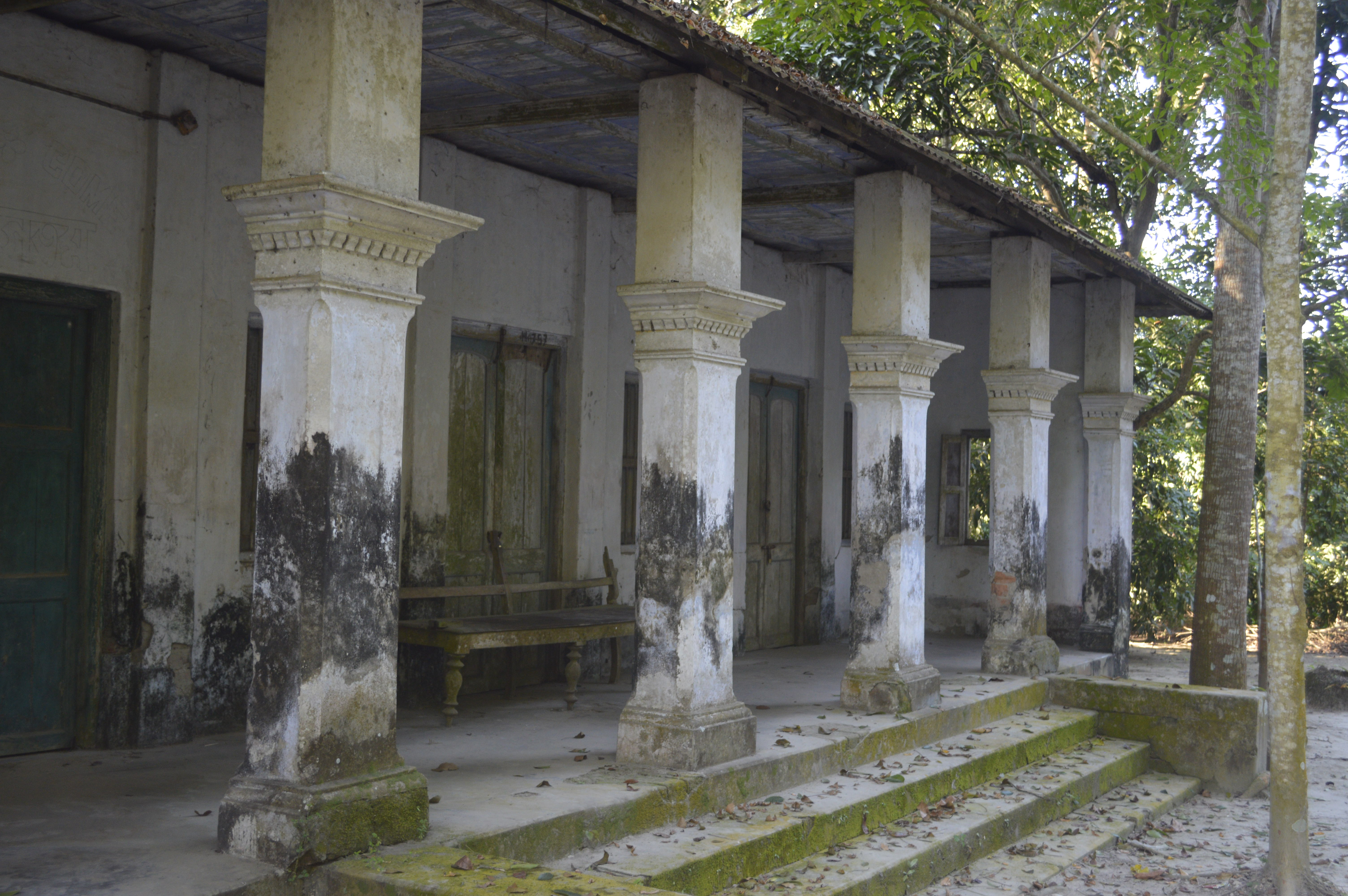
Zamindar's bungalow

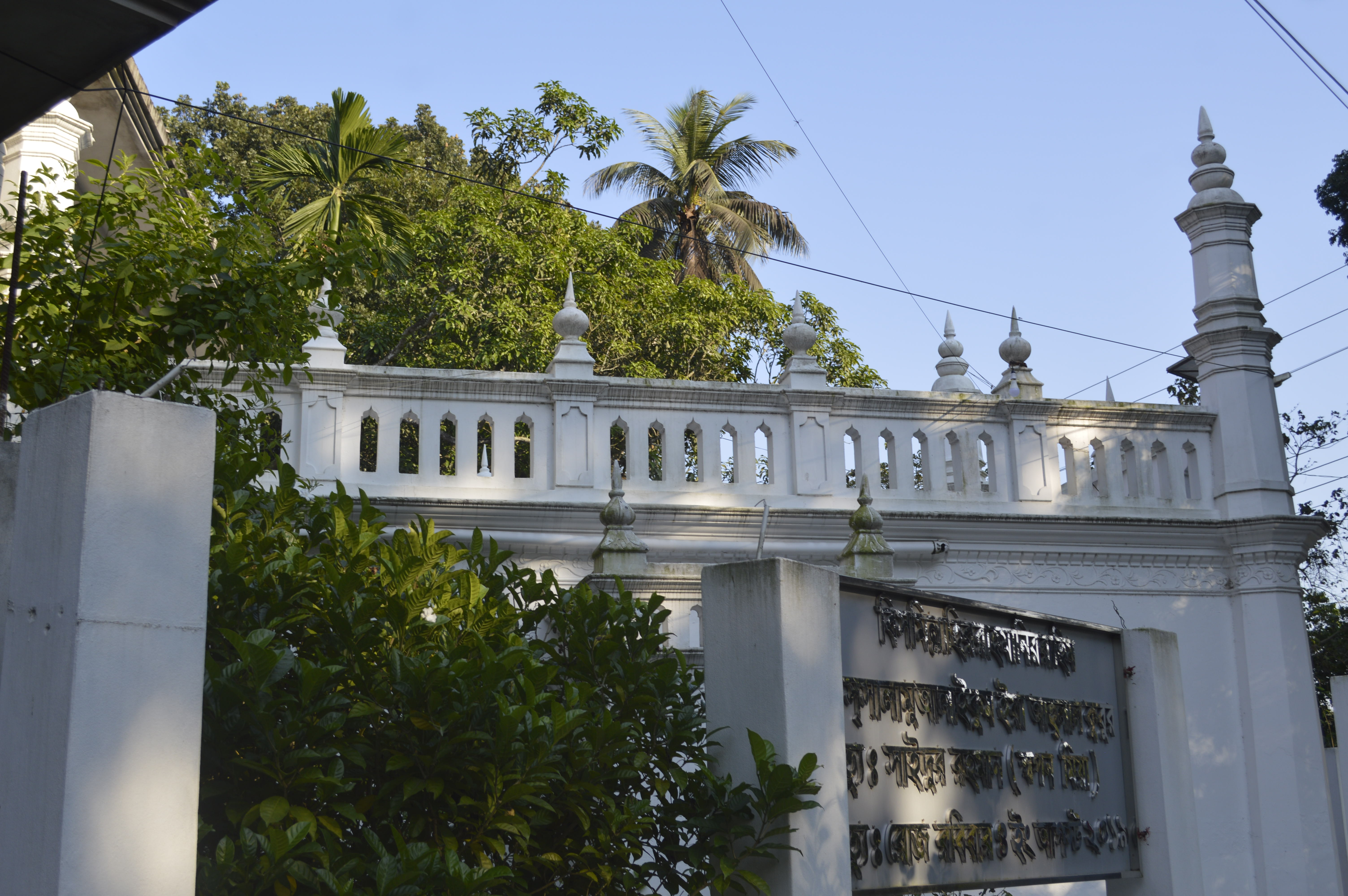
The Amirabad mosque was mentioned by L. S. S. O'Malley in his district gazette in 1913.

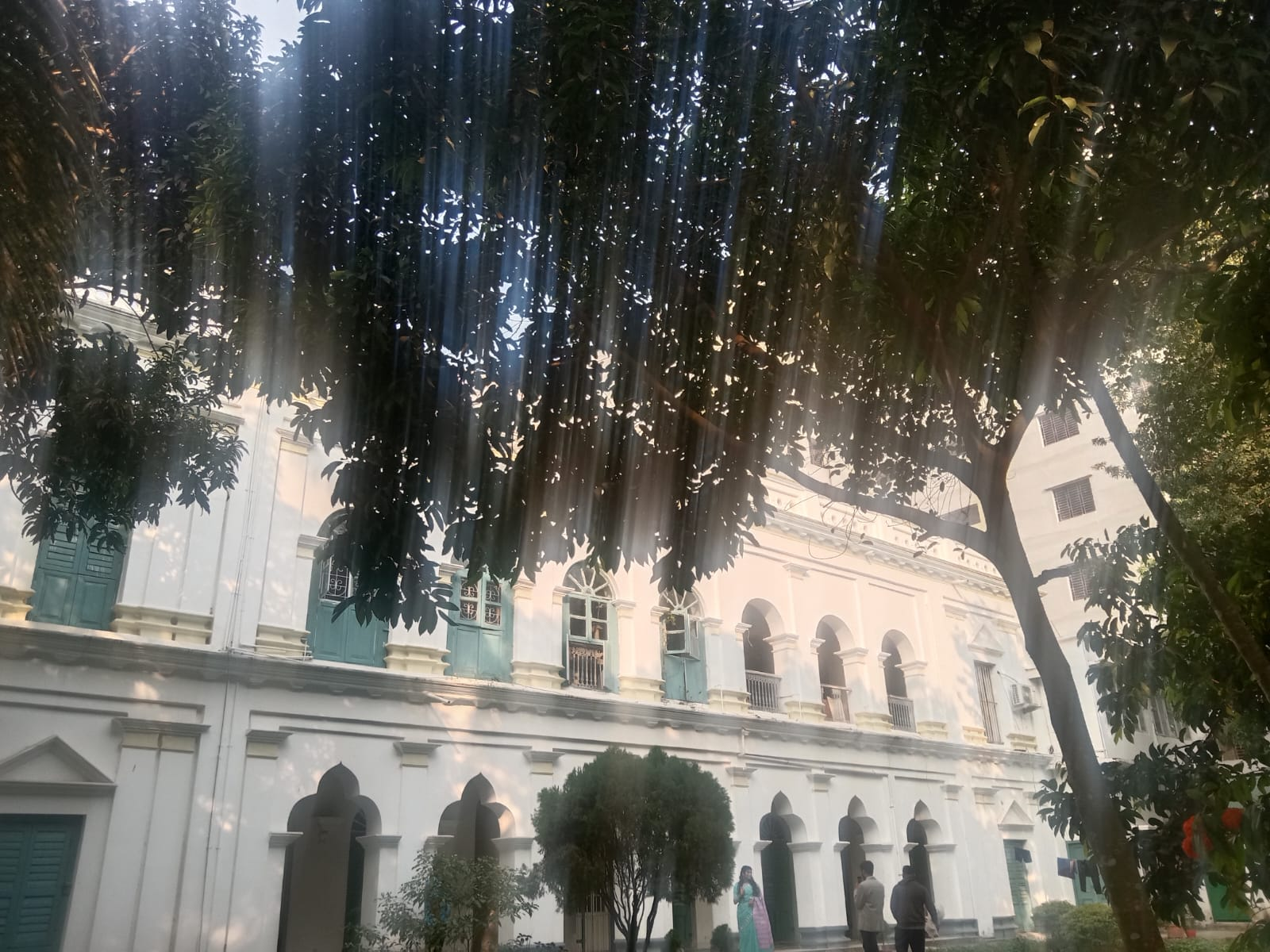
Moyez Manzil

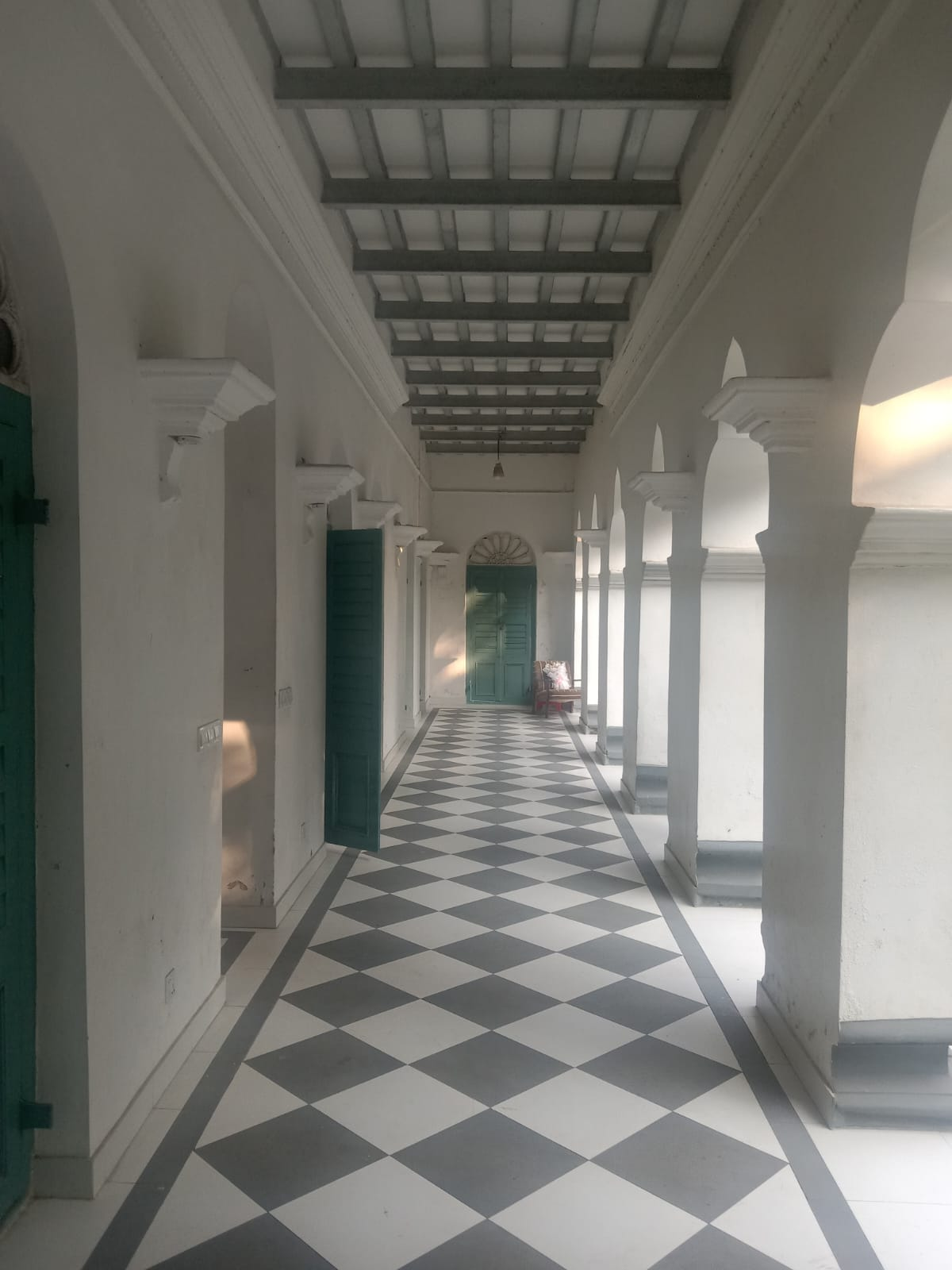
Corridor

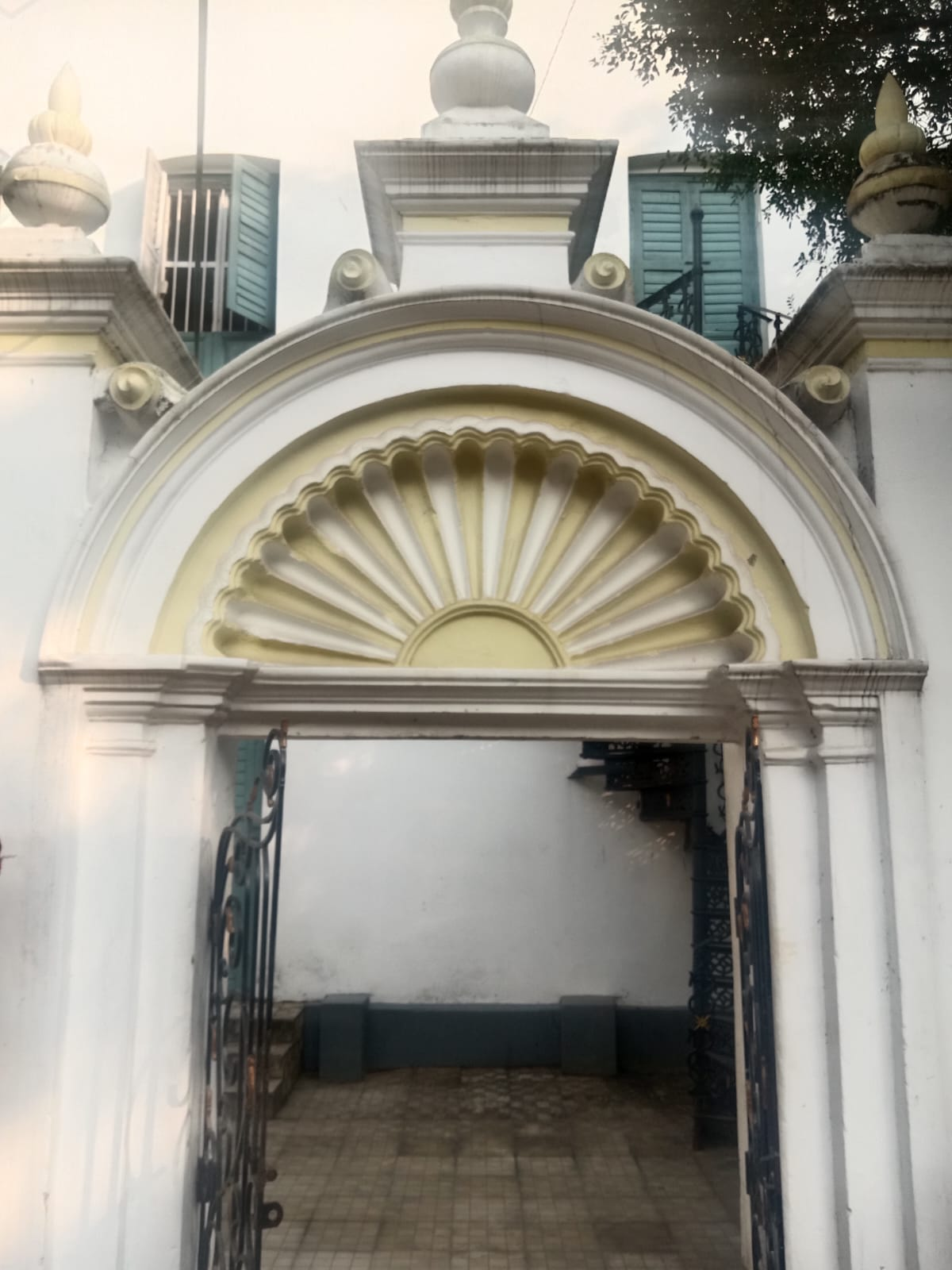
Archway

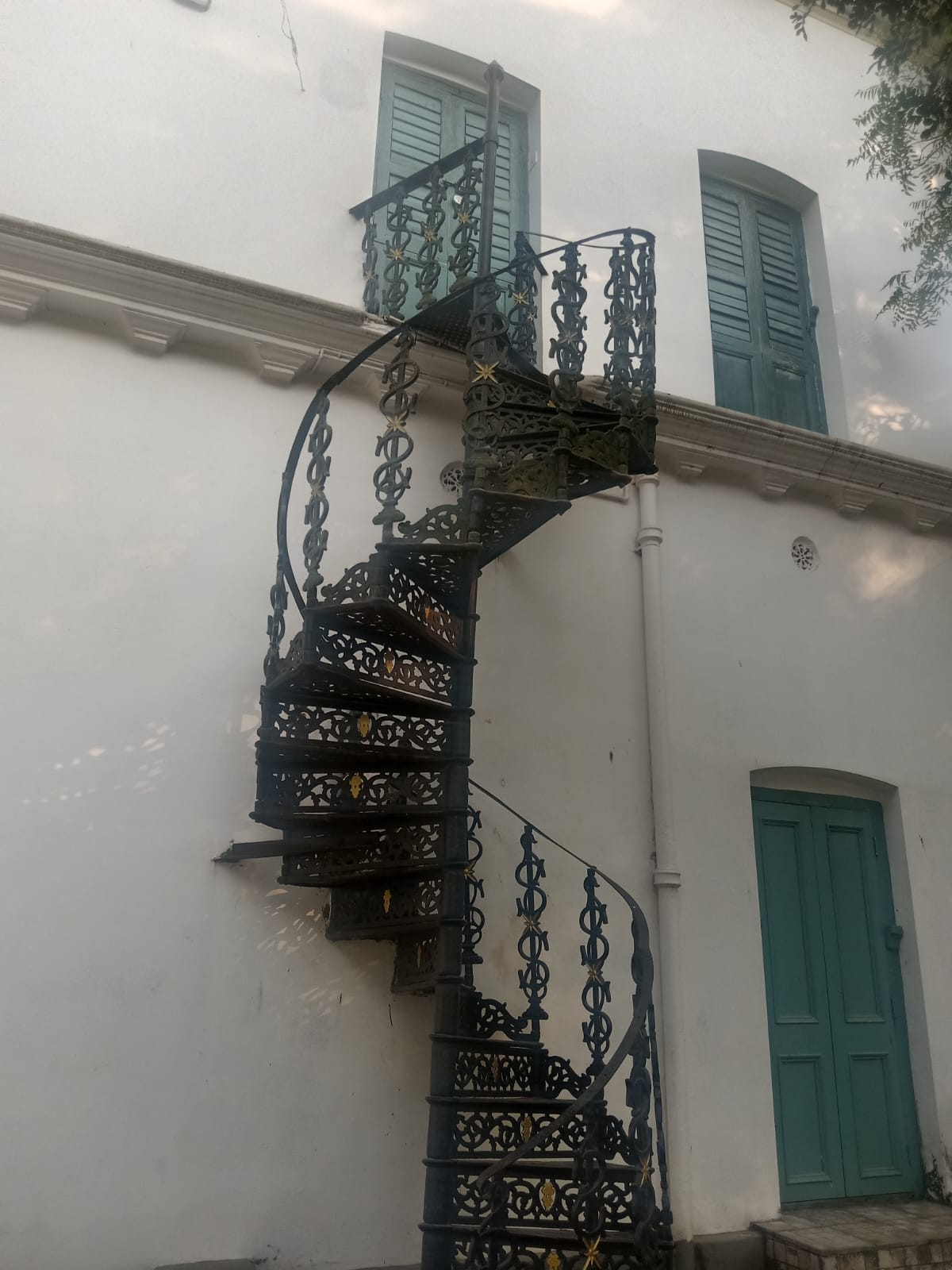
Staircase

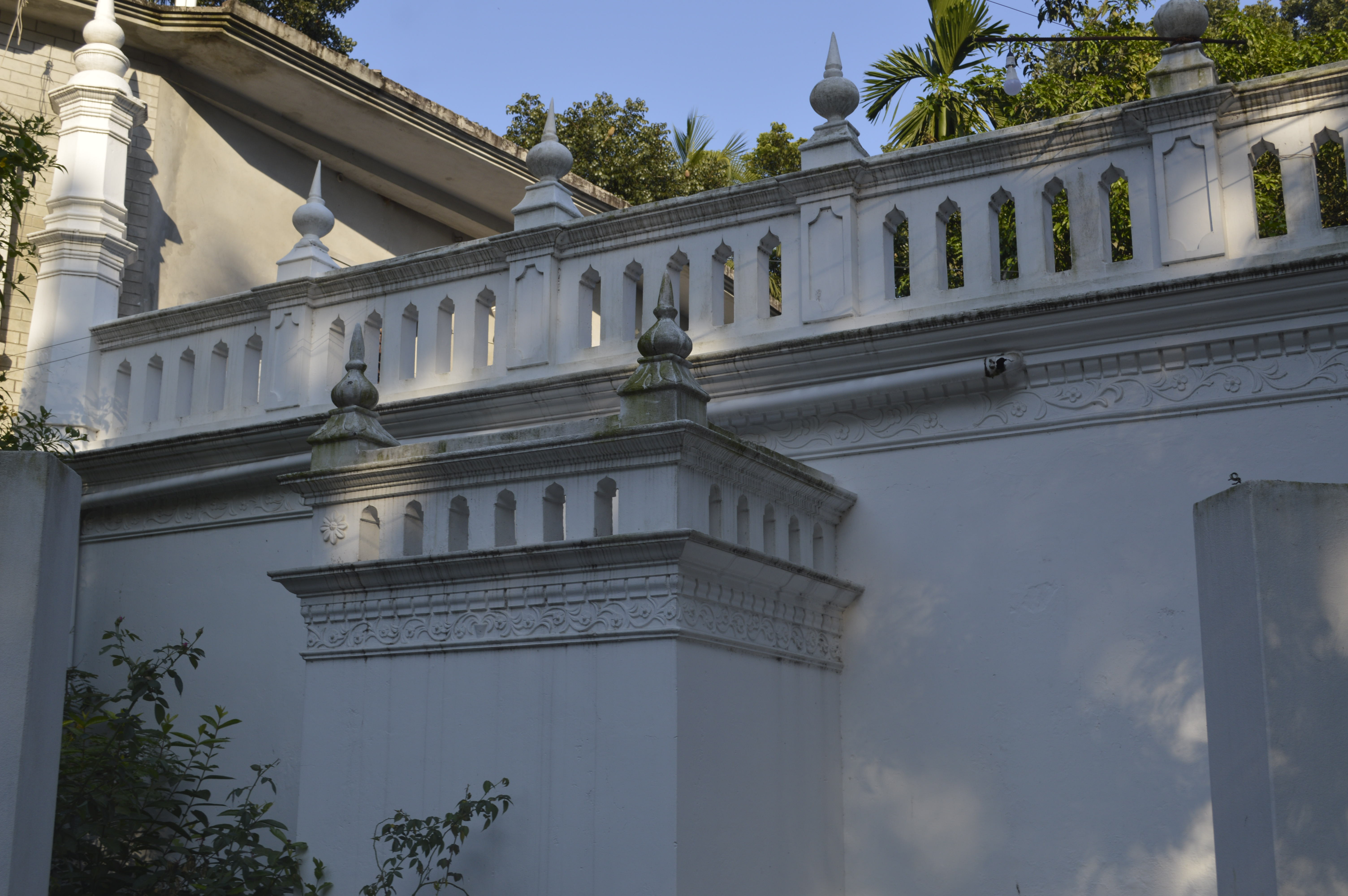
Outer mihrab of an Amirabad Estate Mosque

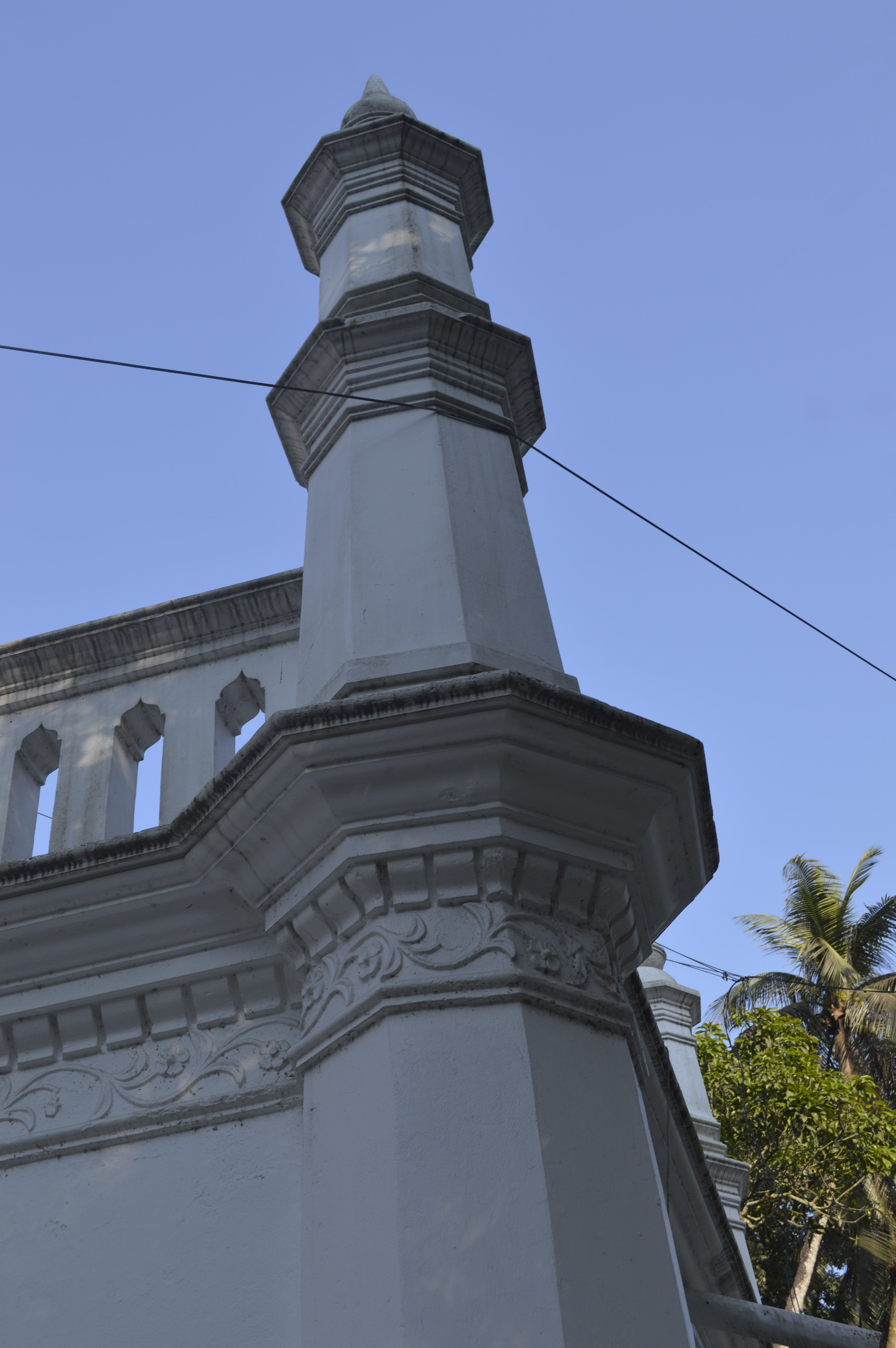
Minaret of Biswas Bari Jame Mosque

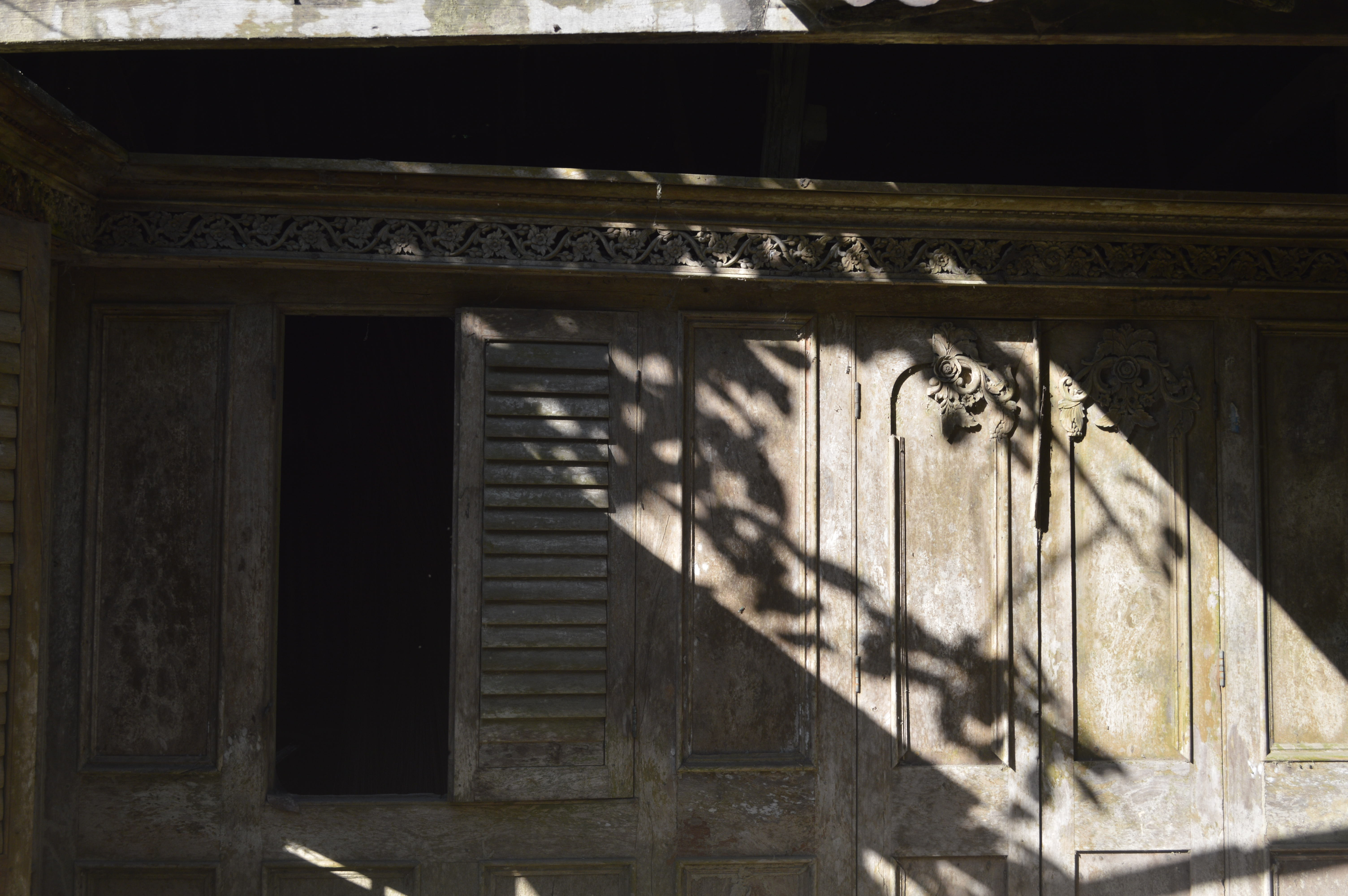
Ruins of a zamindar's wooden pavilion in Amirabad

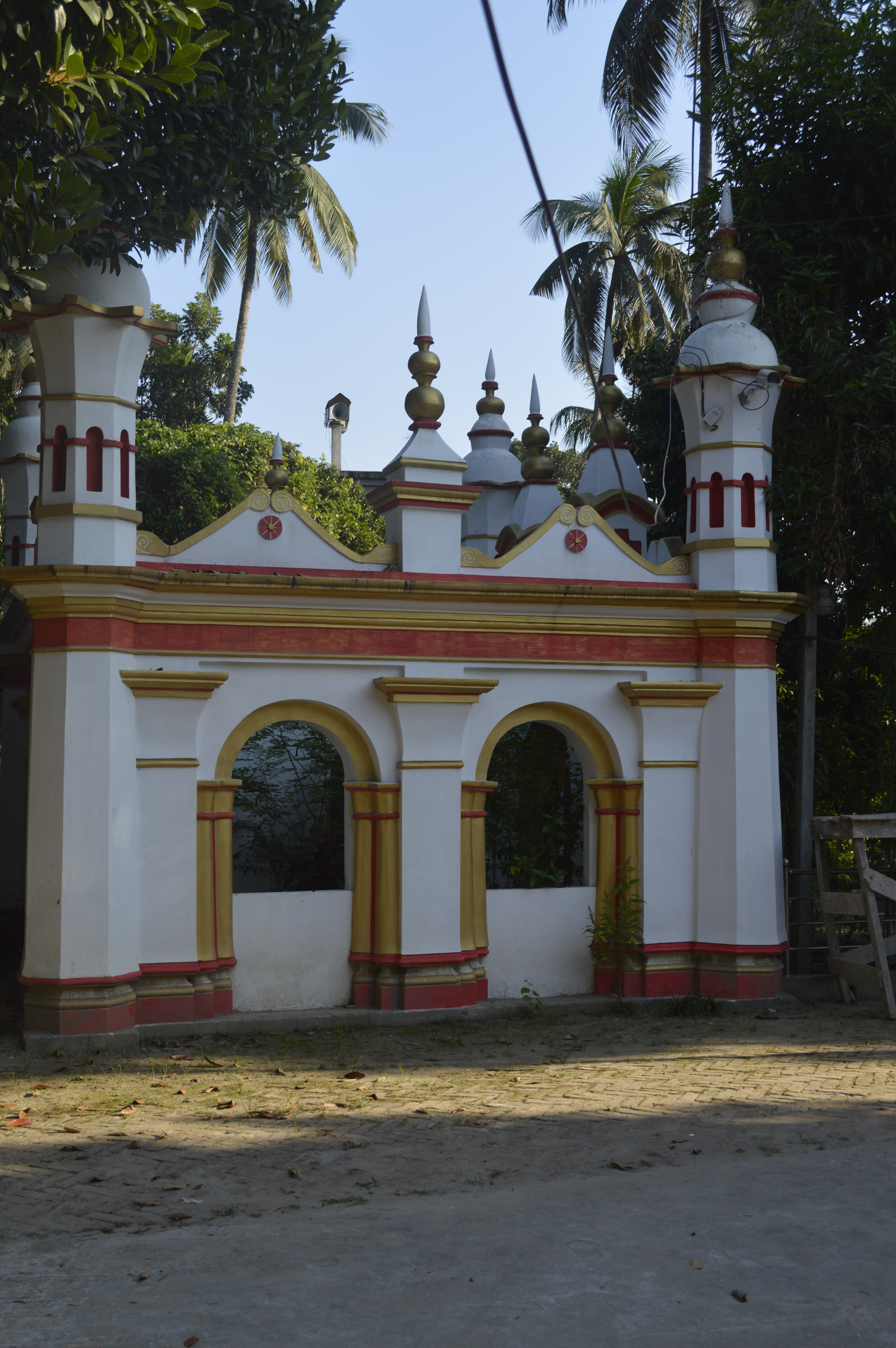
Zamindar mausoleum

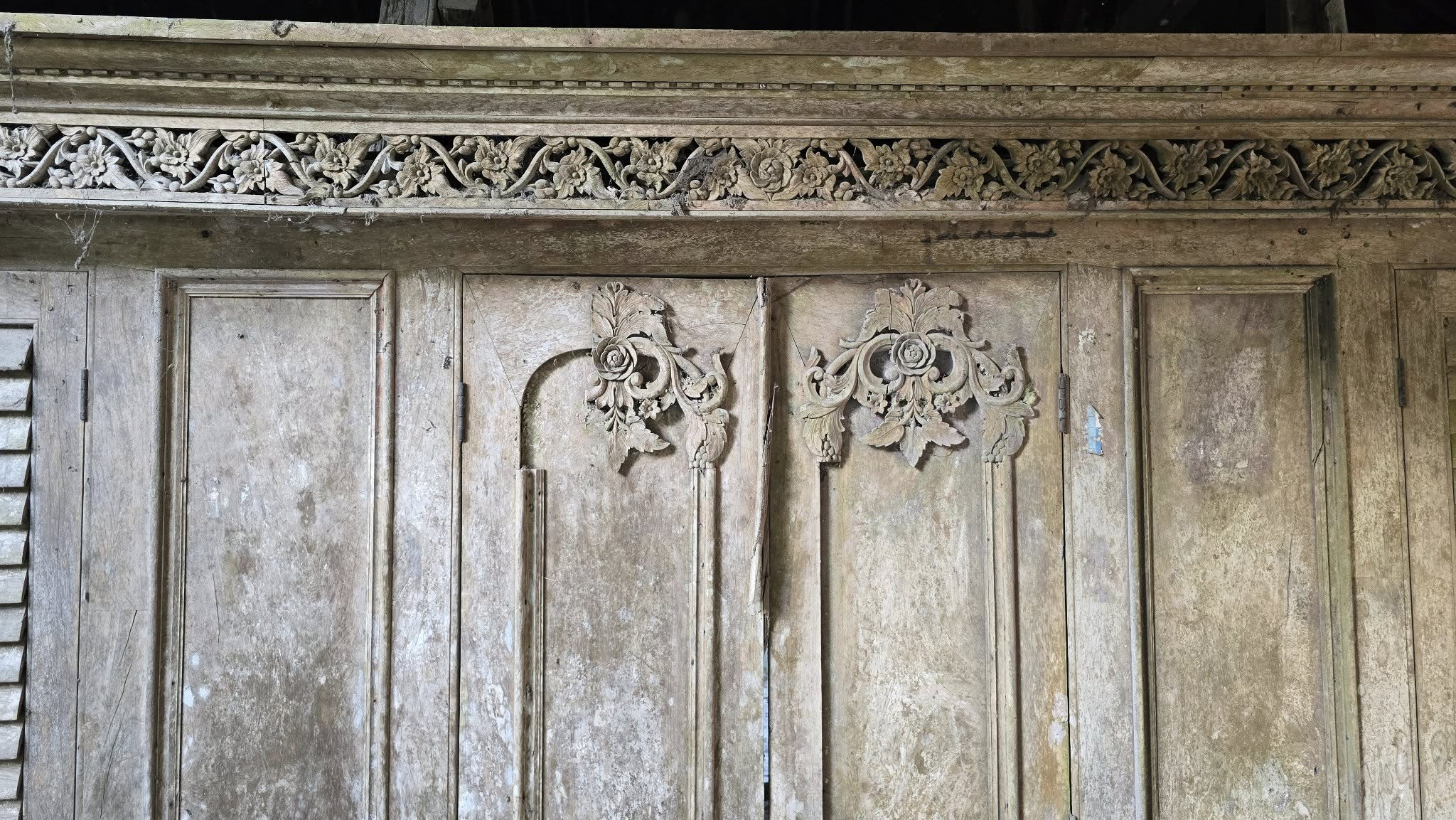
Wooden door and walls

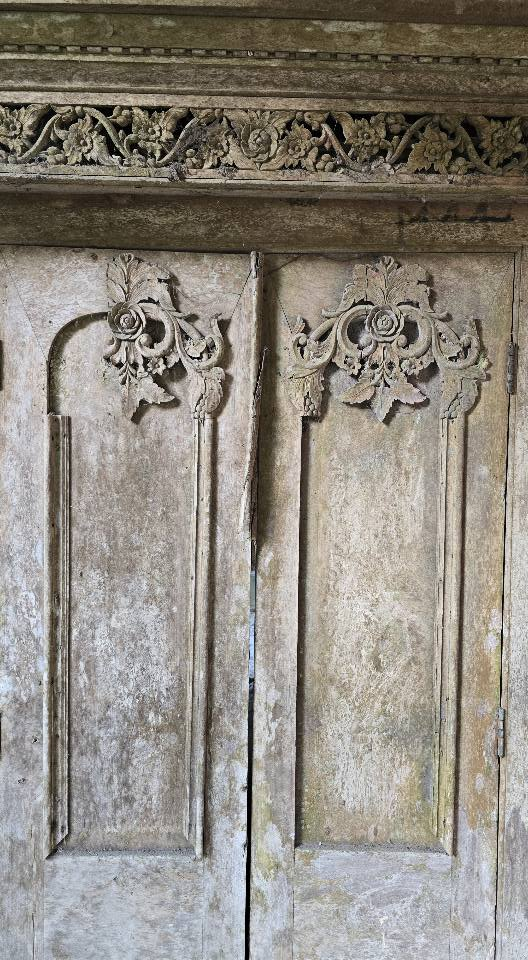
Wooden door

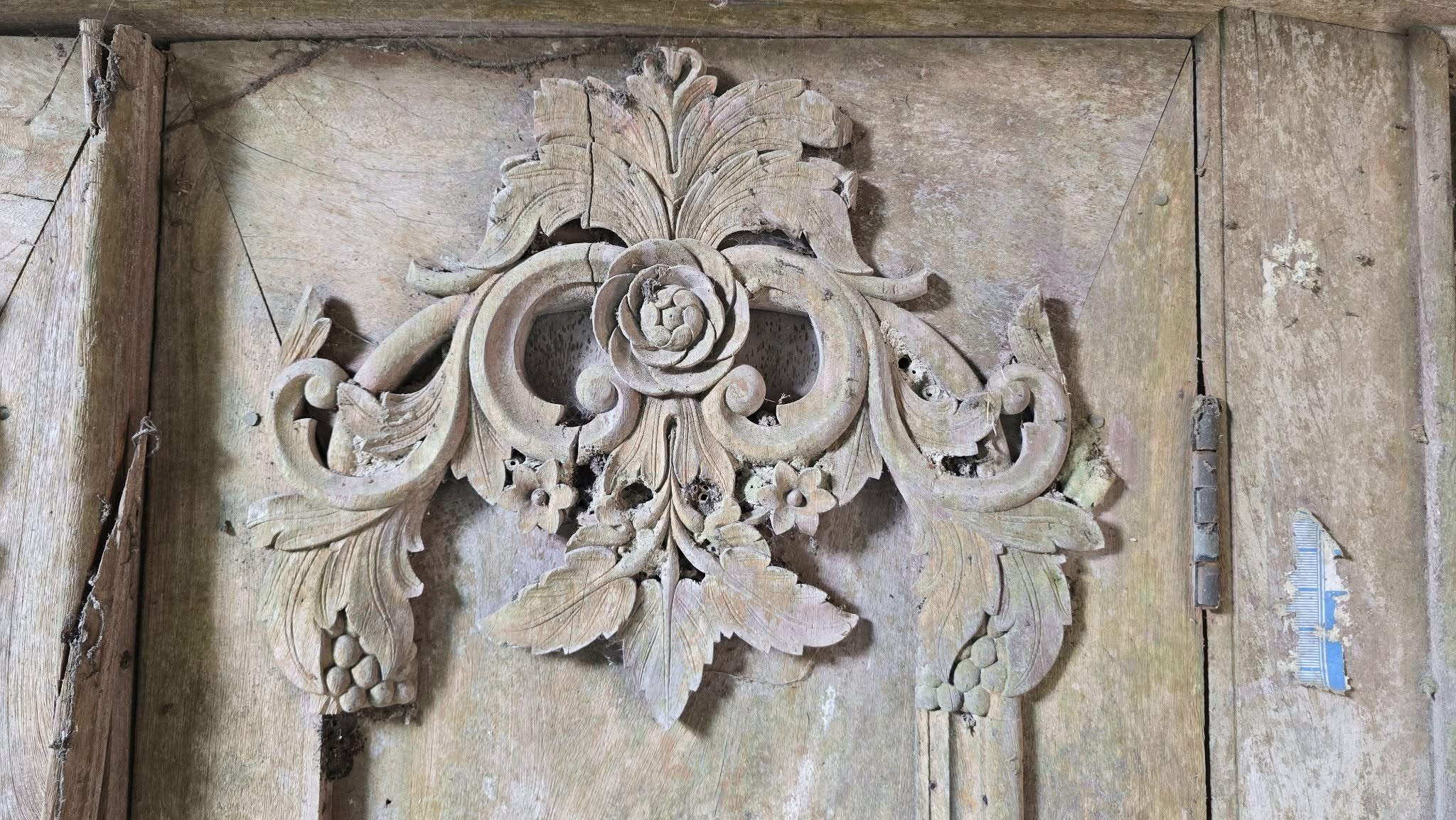
Floral woodwork design

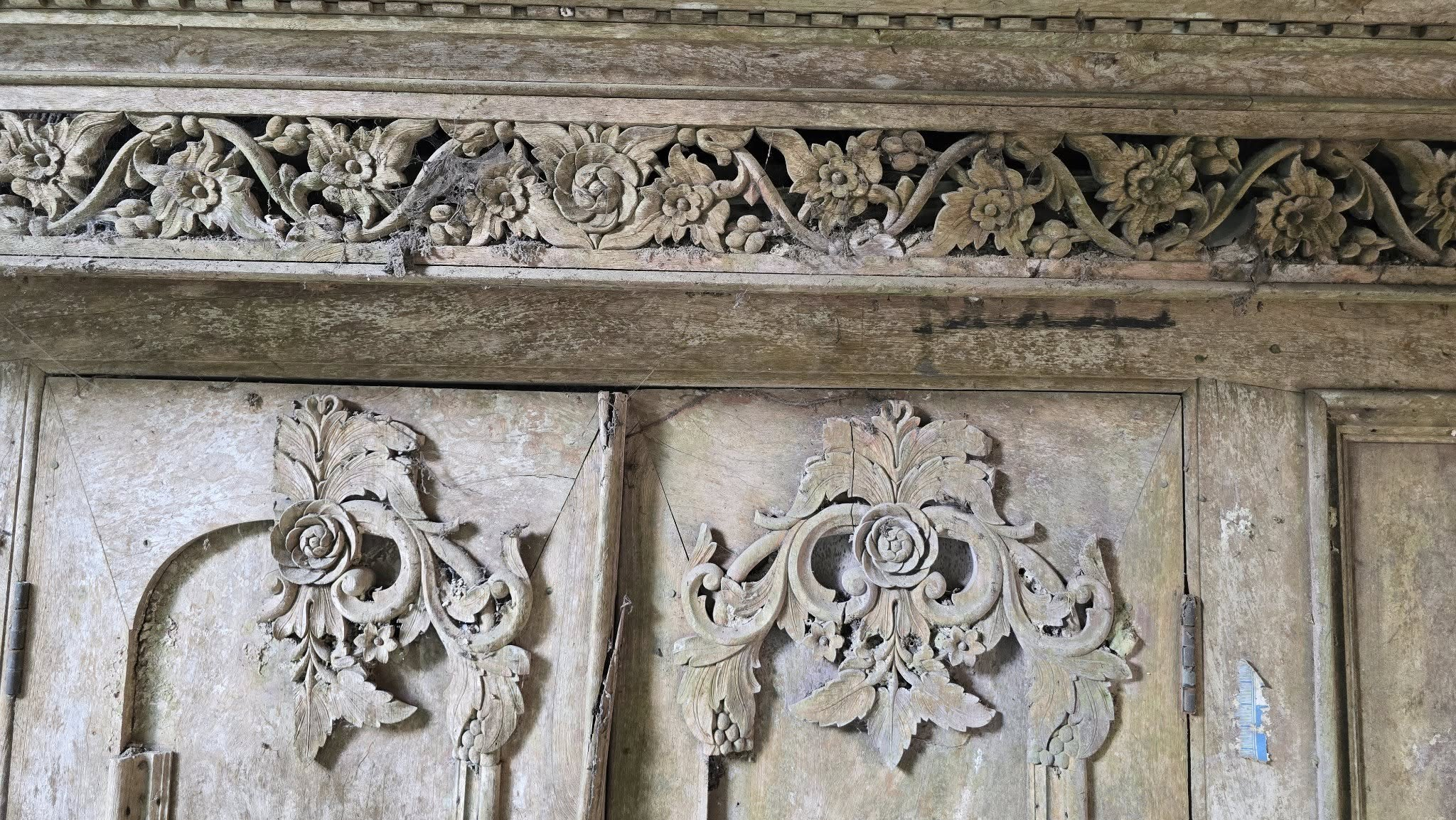
Floral woodwork

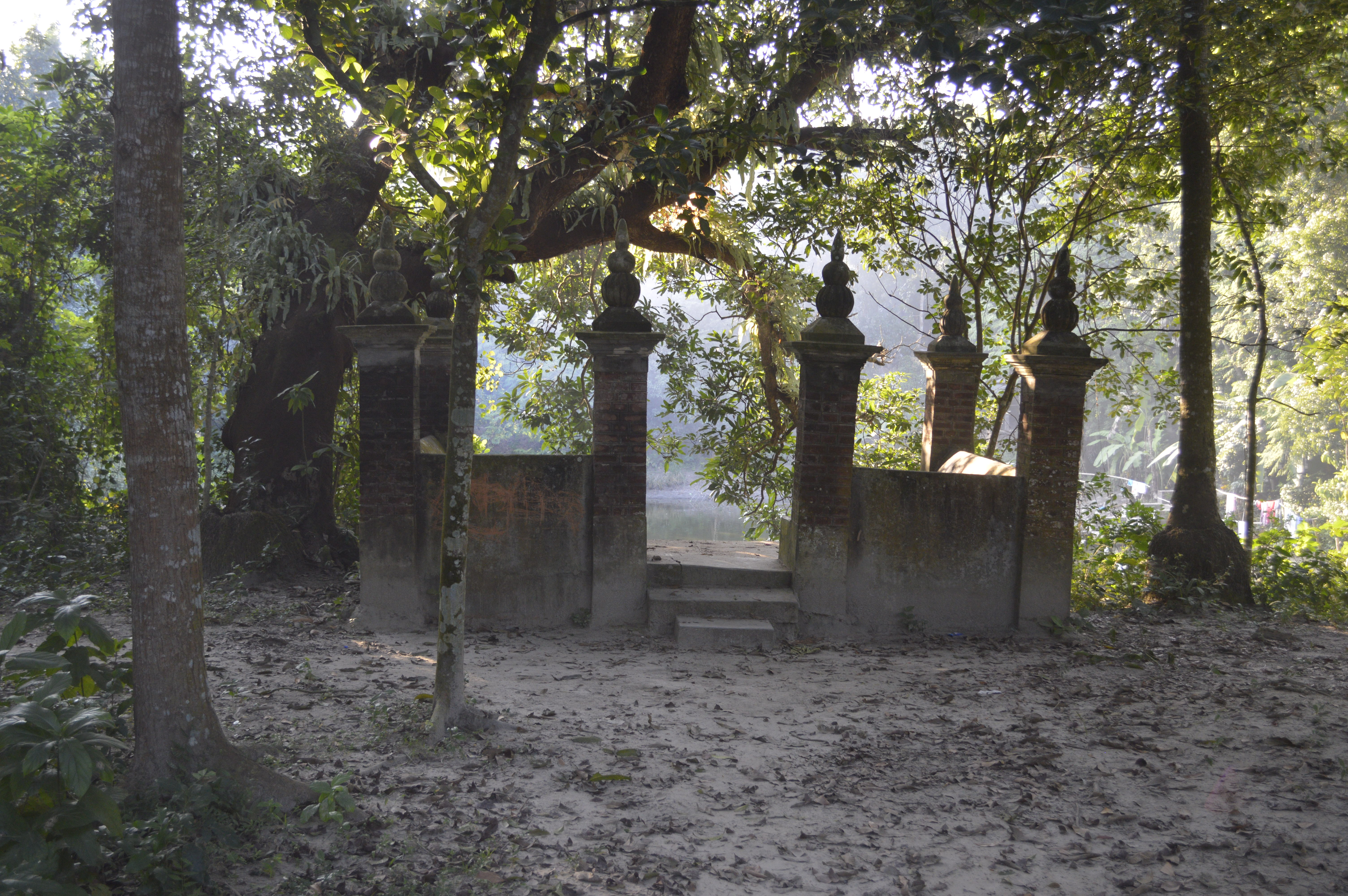
Entrance to a pond

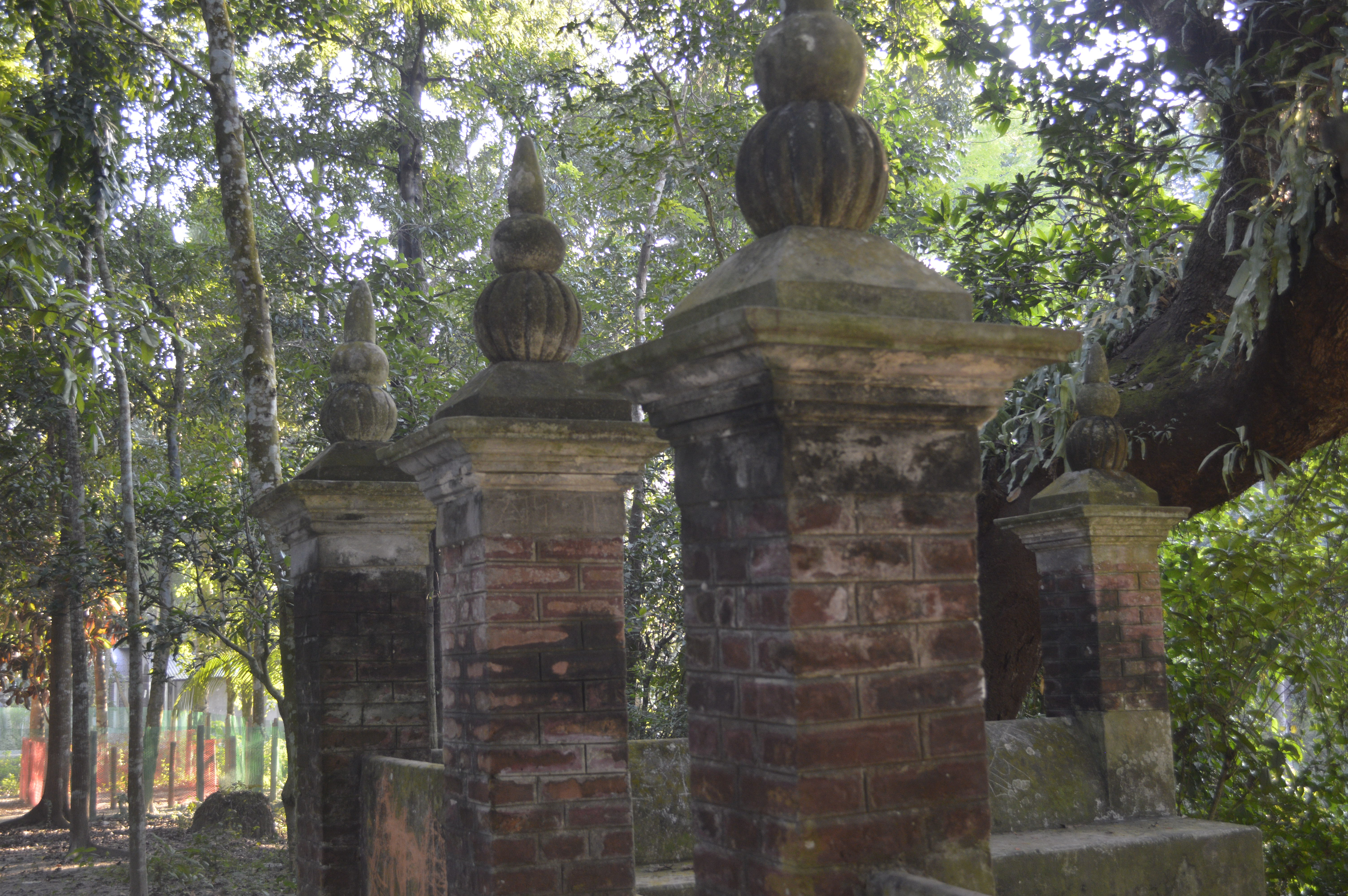
Pillars in a part of the estate

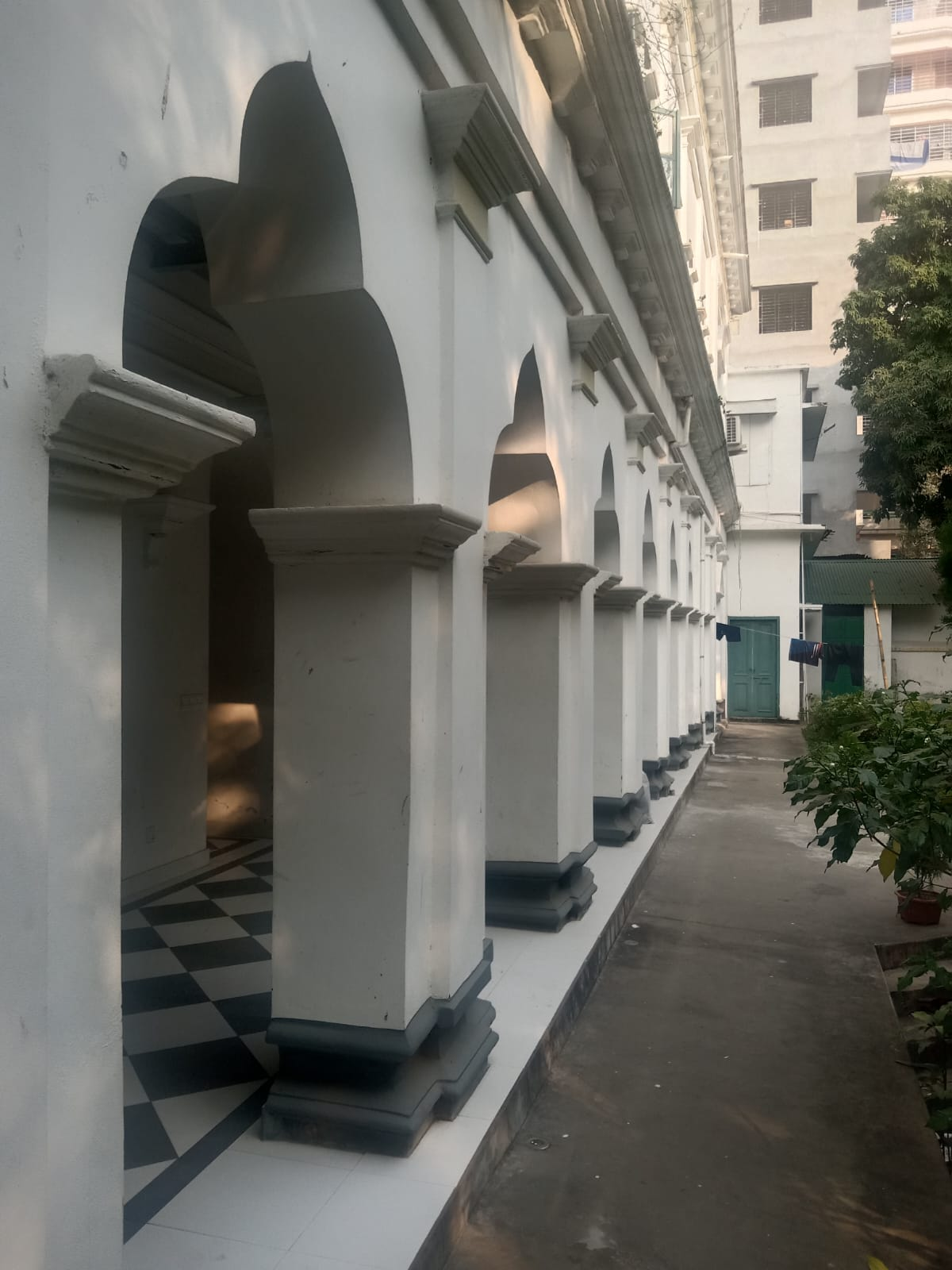
Arches and columns

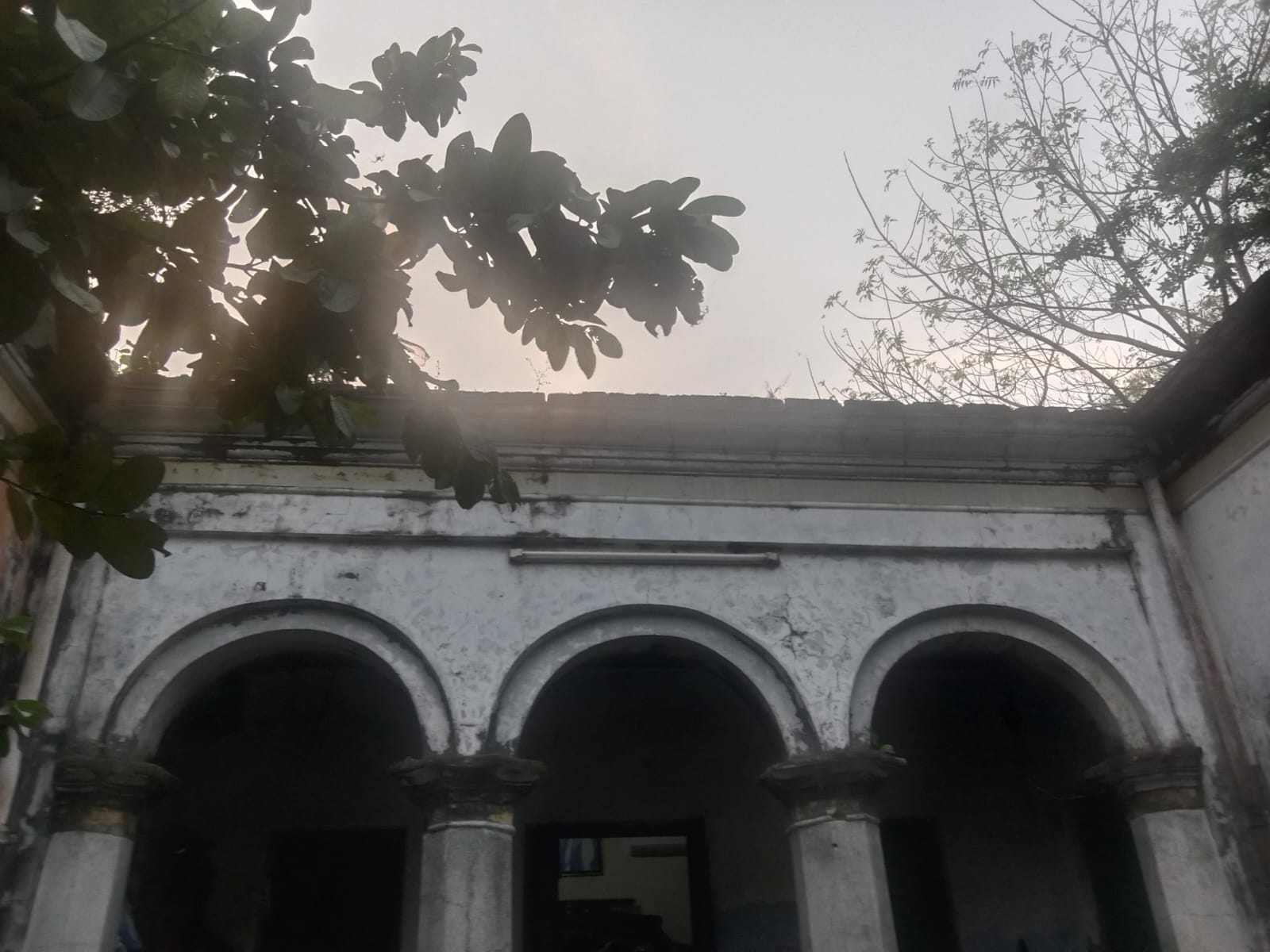
Arches

== Branches ==
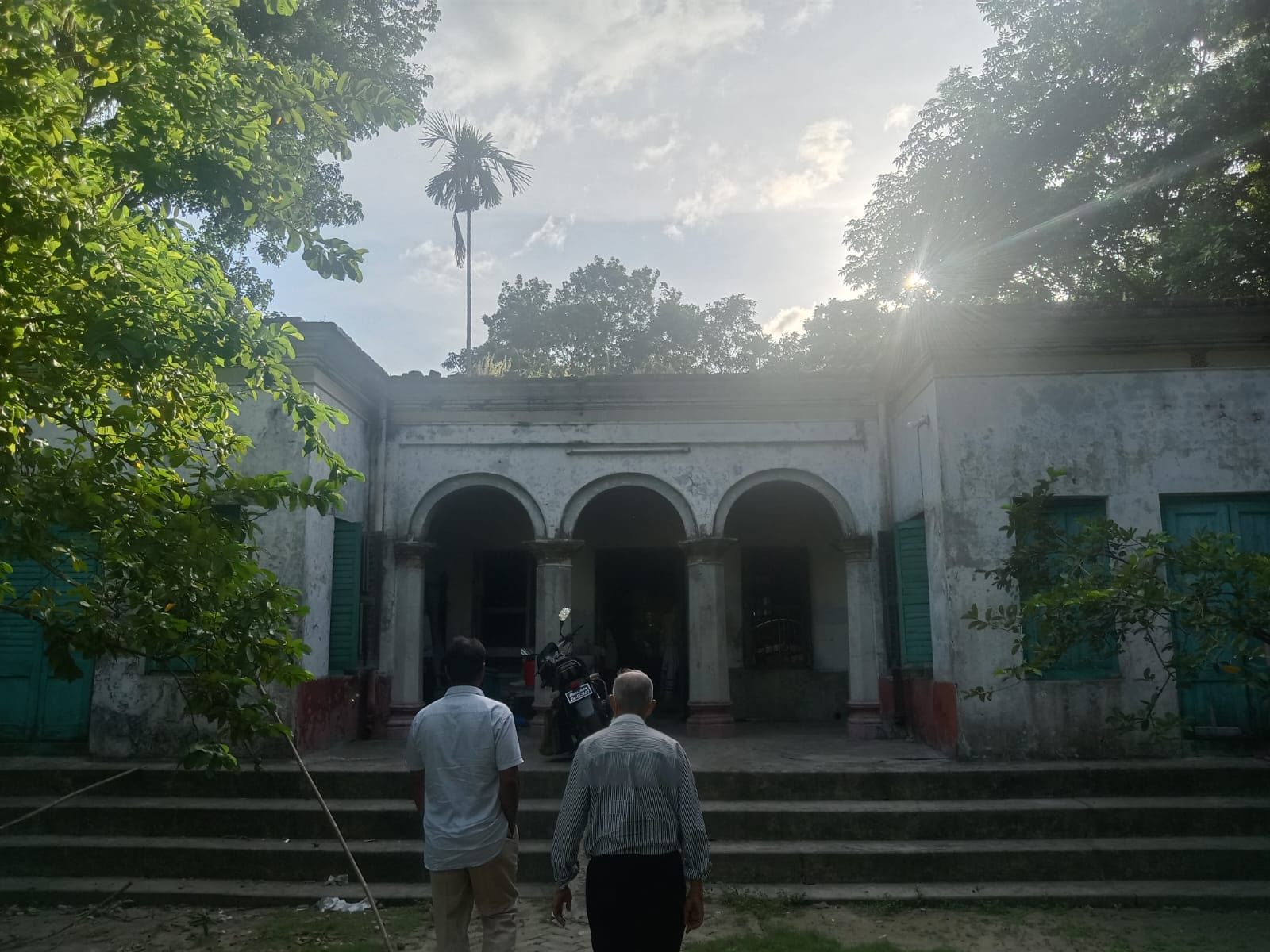
Biswas Bari

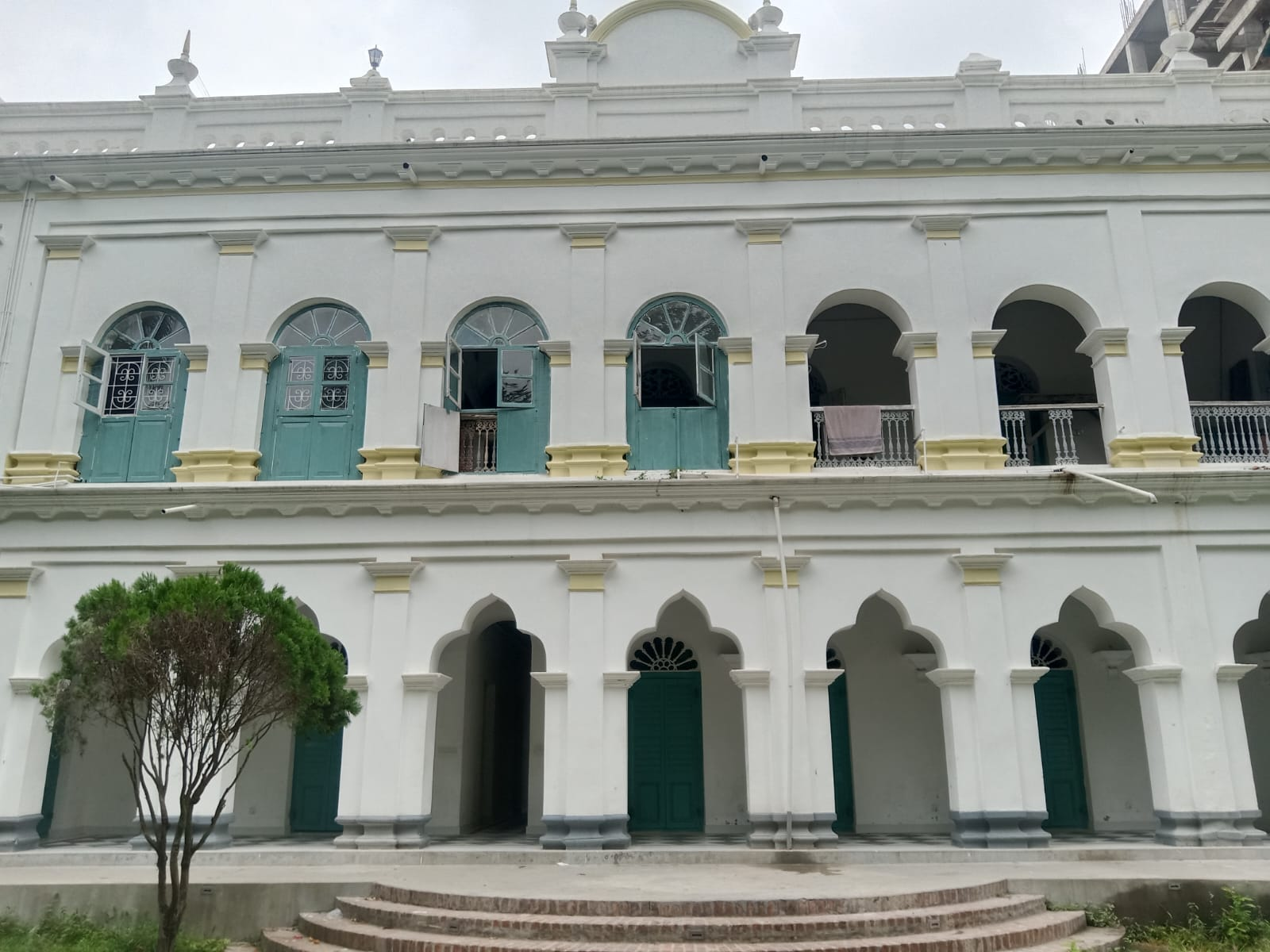
Moyez Manzil

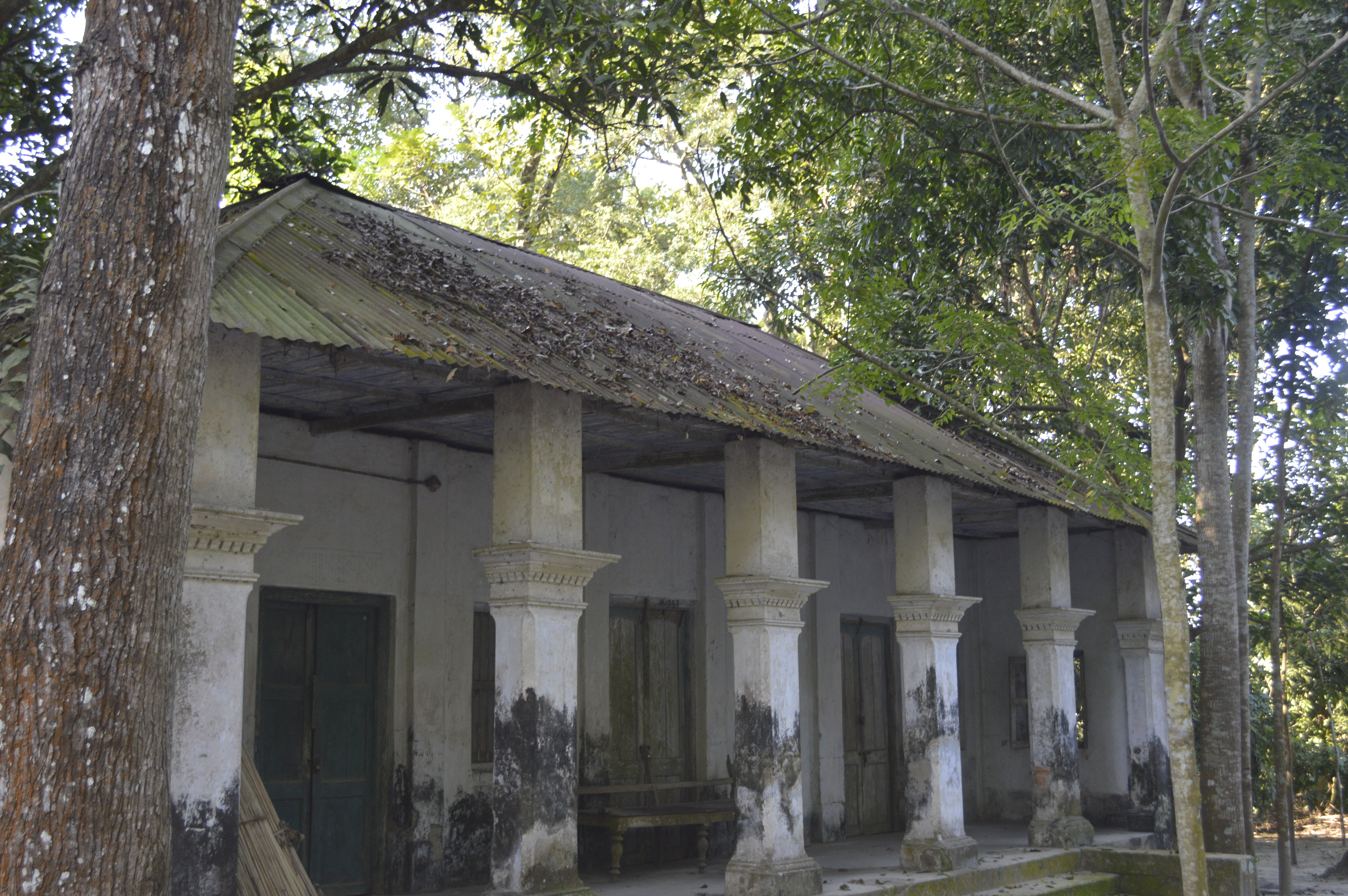
Zamindar's bungalow

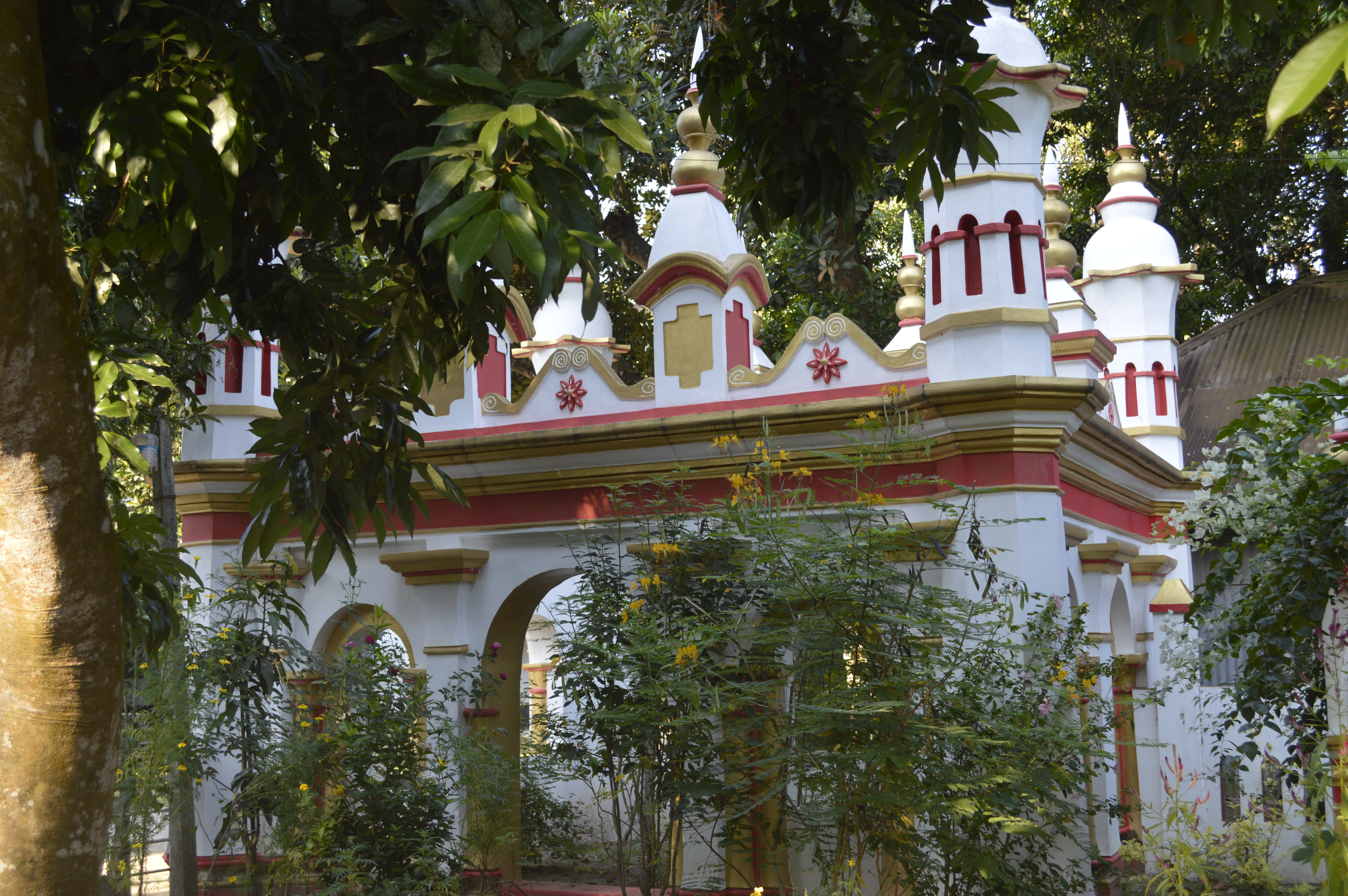
Mausoleum of the Zamindars of Amirabad

In colonial times after the Permanent Settlement, it was customary for zamindar estates in Faridpur to be shared by a group of villages. On average, a single estate included properties in five villages. A single village contained properties of multiple estates. Seven villages also constituted an estate. In Amirabad's case, four villages constituted the estate. These four villages emerged as four branches of the family. Thus, the clan of the Faridpur Biswas Estate has four branches.

=== Biswas Bari ===
The ancestral origins of the entire estate began in Biswas Bari which was the birthplace of the estate under British rule. It is located in the hamlet of Chandpur. It was the principal seat of the Faridpur Biswas Estate. The original estate includes several heritage buildings and intricately designed wooden structures. Furniture from Biswas Bari can be viewed at the Bangladesh National Museum.

=== Moyez Manzil ===
After leaving Biswas Bari, the merchant-zamindar Chowdhury Moyezuddin Biwshash built the Moyez Manzil in the main town of Faridpur. Moyez Manzil became the leading house of Faridpur. The property is now administered as an Islamic waqf.

=== Borobari ===
Borobari is also known as Biswas Bari II. It is located in the hamlet of Chandpur. The family of Borobari has produced several local government leaders, including leaders of union parishad.

=== Chowdhury Bari ===
Chowdhury Bari is a branch of the family located in the hamlet of Chandpur.

== Notable members ==
- Chowdhury Moyezuddin Biwshash, 19th century merchant
- Chowdhury Abd-Allah Zaheeruddin, member of the Bengal Legislative Council
- Yusuf Ali Chowdhury, member of the Bengal Legislative Assembly
- Chowdhury Kamal Ibne Yusuf, former cabinet minister of Bangladesh
- Kamran Hossain Chowdhury, member of the 4th Parliament of Bangladesh
- Chowdhury Akmal Ibne Yusuf, member of the 8th Parliament of Bangladesh
- Chowdhury Rafiqul Abrar, Adviser to the Interim Government led by Prof. Muhammad Yunus
- Nayab Yusuf Ahmed, member of the 13th Parliament of Bangladesh

== See also ==
- Zamindars of Bengal
- Dhaka Nawab Family
- Padamdi Nawab Estate
- Singranatore family
- Nawab Faizunnesa
- Prithimpassa family
- Gunahar Zamindar Bari
