= Moyez Manzil =

Zamindar's house in Faridpur

Coordinates: 23°36′19″N 89°50′49″E

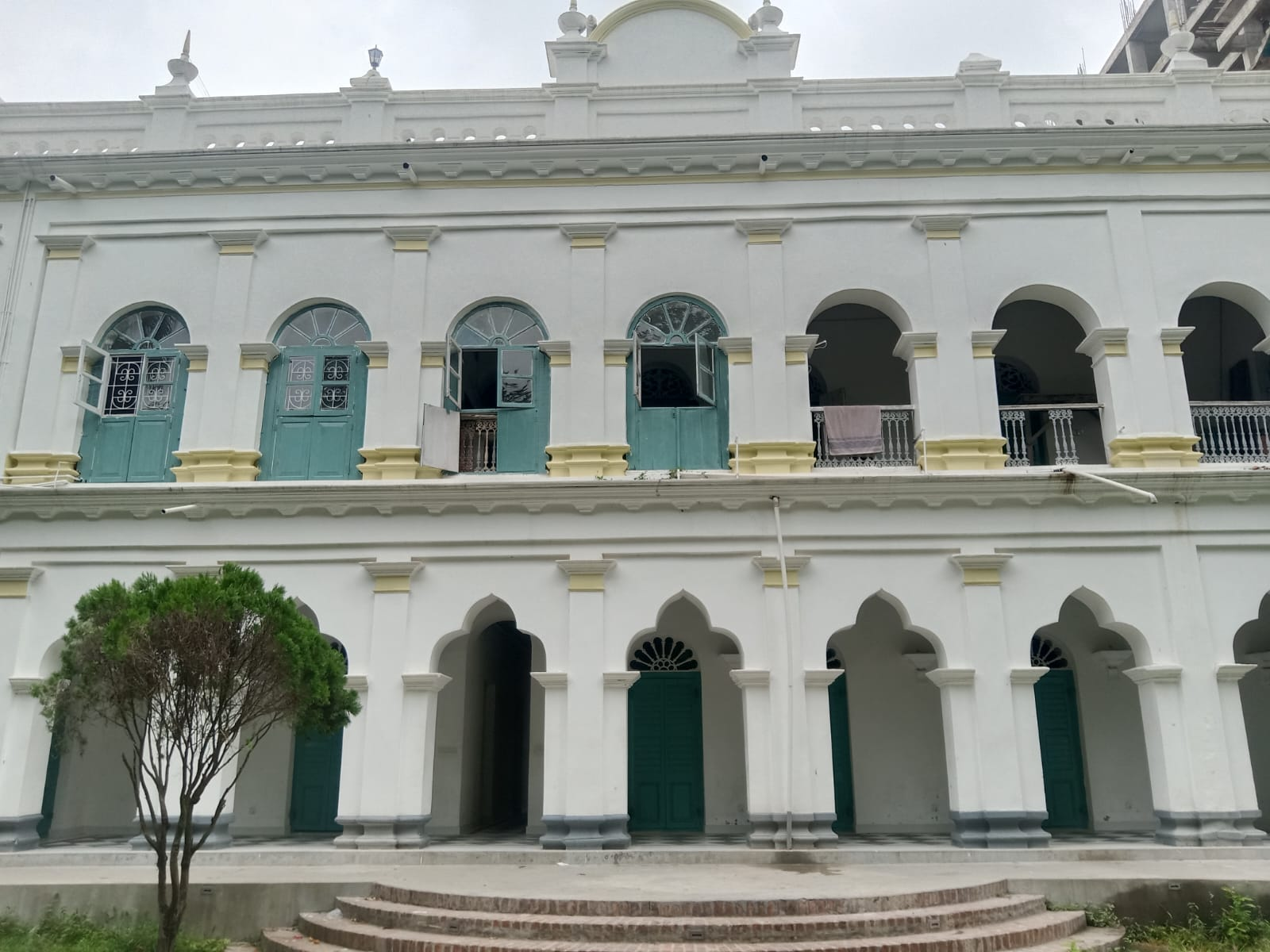
- Established: 1885
- Location: Kamlapur, Faridpur, Bangladesh

Moyez Manzil is an Islamic waqf property in Faridpur, Bangladesh. It is located in the neighborhood of Kamlapur in the main town of Faridpur. It is one of the four branches of the Faridpur Biswas Estate. It is owned by the descendants of Chowdhury Moyezuddin Biwshash.

== History ==
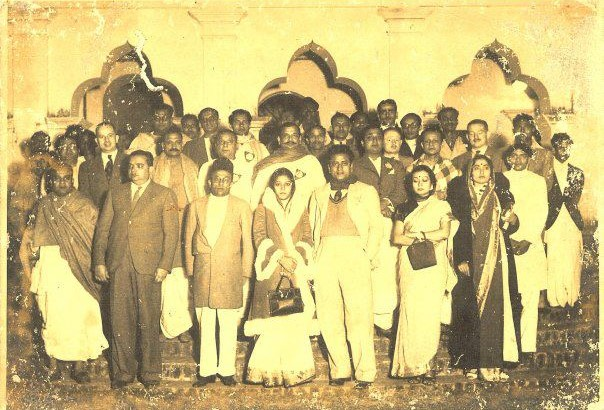
Delegates of the All India Motion Pictures Conference at Moyez Manzil on 31 December 1934, including Indian movie star Prithviraj Kapoor.

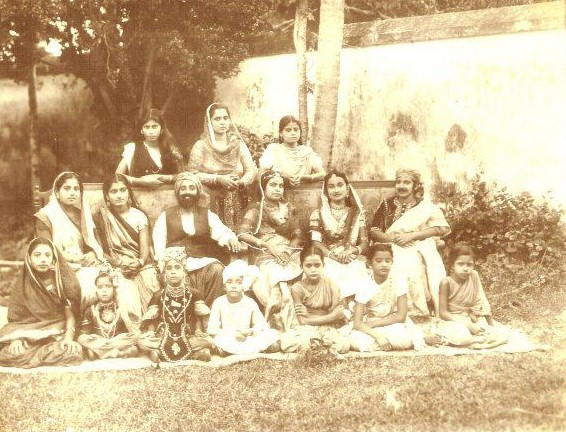
Grandchildren of Chowdhury Moyezuddin Biwshash in the summer of 1945.

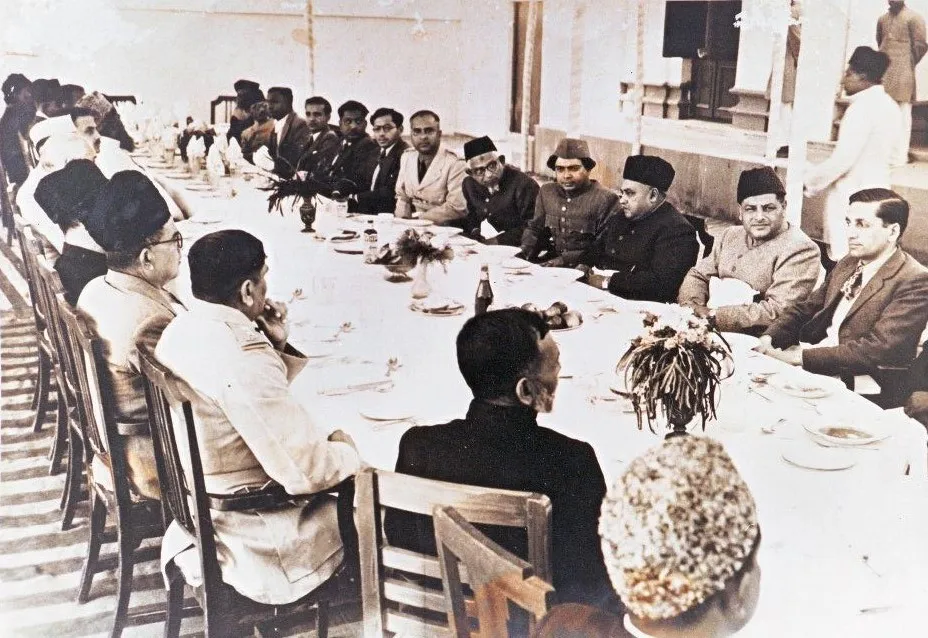
Sir Khawaja Nazimuddin with Lal Mia and Mohan Mia at Moyez Manzil in 1946.

In 1853, Chowdhury Moyezuddin Biswas left his birthplace in Amirabad Estate, Faridpur after falling out with members of his family. He migrated to North Bengal where he became a disciple of Sufi saint Khwaja Yunus Ali Enayetpuri. Moyezuddin became a prominent merchant of 19th century Bengal. He built his own estate by acquiring landholdings in different parts of the Bengal Presidency. He became one of the wealthiest merchants and landlords in the region. When he returned to Faridpur, the zamindars at Biswas Bari agreed to donate 11 lac rupees for the construction of a palatial house in the main town. Moyezuddin initiated construction for the new palace. Construction finished in 1885. In 1886, Moyezuddin moved into the new property with his family. His sons Lal Mia, Mohan Mia, and Tara Mia were born in Moyez Manzil. The property was nicknamed as the White House of Faridpur because of its imposing white facade and its importance to local politics.

Moyez Manzil hosted many important gatherings in British India. These events included meetings of the All India Muslim League and All India Congress Committee, as well as the All India Literary Conference, All India Motion Pictures Conference, Bengal Education Policy Conference, All India Nationalist Muslim Conference, Bengal Agricultural Fair, and the Bengal Science and Technology Fair.

Among those have visited and stayed at Moyez Manzil include Kazi Nazrul Islam, Rabindranath Tagore, Subhash Chandra Bose, Sarojini Naidu, Prithviraj Kapoor, Chittaranjan Das, Khawaja Nazimuddin, A. K. Fazlul Huq, and the Nawab of Mahmudabad. Moyezuddin's eldest son married a descendant of Nawab Alivardi Khan.

== Architecture ==
The building is an example of Indo-Saracenic architecture in the 19th century. It was built as a Bengali Muslim zamindar mansion. The main building consists of a two-storied Victorian mansion of 20 rooms, made in a combination of Victorian and Islamic architecture, with a strange simplicity of layout and austerity of style, devoid of the labyrinthine style of palace architecture with a complex layout of interconnected rooms and passages, and rather standing in resplendent glory with a simple row of rooms lined up between of over 300 feet of verandahs.

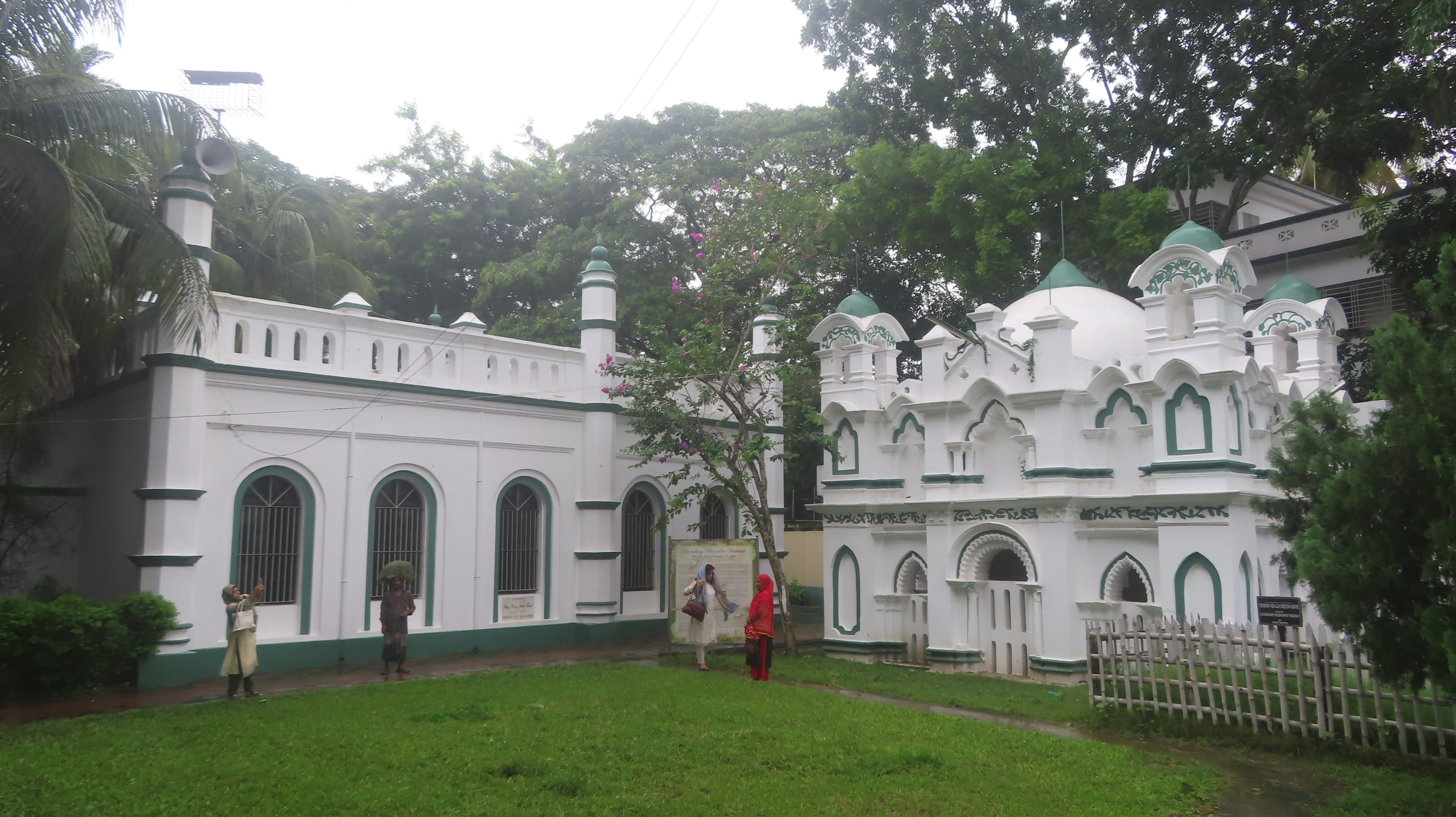
Mausoleum of Moyezuddin and his descendants.

== Property ==
Moyez Manzil is situated in the old colonial neighborhood of Kamlapur near the Circuit House, the Faridpur Judges Court, and the District Commissioner's office. The property originally measured 30 acres with gardens and orchards. Some part of the land was donated to Halima Girls High School and Moyezuddin High School. The property was then reduced to 10 acres. There are five buildings inside the property. Floor space measures 30,000 square feet across five buildings with 40 rooms.

== See also ==
- Biswas Bari
