= Lewis Sydney Steward O'Malley =

Anthropologist from British India (1874–1941)

L. S. S. O'Malley
- Born: Lewis Sydney Steward O’Malley; October 23, 1874; Flitcham, Freebridge Lynn, Norfolk, England
- Died: 1941 (aged 66–67); Oxford, Oxfordshire, England.
- Education: Hertford College, Oxford (B. A.)
- Spouse: Ida Sewell Prichard (m. 1900)
- Writing career
- Period: 1898–1924
- Notable work: Bengal District Gazetteers

Lewis Sydney Steward O’Malley, also known as L. S. S. O'Malley (1874–1941), one of the most esteemed colonial, 'official' anthropologists in British India, served as a member of the Indian Civil Service (ICS) from 1898 to 1924.

== Biography ==
Lewis Sydney Steward O'Malley was born on October 23, 1874, in Flitcham, Freebridge Lynn, Norfolk, England, to Bryan O'Malley, a minister. He married Ida Sewell Prichard on November 24, 1900, at the Cathedral in Calcutta, India. He died in 1941 in Oxford, Oxfordshire, England. O'Malley served as a British Civil Servant in India and received his education at Norwich Grammar School and Hertford College, Oxford, where he earned his B.A.

In 1898, he joined the Indian Civil Service (ICS) and spent several years working as a Magistrate and Collector in Bengal. He later served in the General and Revenue Departments in Bengal. He retired in 1924 with the honor of Companion of the Order of the Indian Empire (C.I.E.).

Throughout his career, O'Malley published numerous works, including the Bengal District Gazetteers for Santal Parganas and Purnea, for which he was the editor. He also authored Indian Caste Customs in 1934, Popular Hinduism in 1935, and Modern India and the West in 1941.

== Books and Articles ==
- Baden-Powell, B. H. 1896. The Indian Village Community. London: Longmans.
- Blunt, E. A. H. 1931. The Caste System of Northern India. London: Oxford University Press.
- Crooke, W. 1896a. The Tribes and Castes of the North-Western Provinces and Oudh, 4 vols. Calcutta: Government Printing.
- Crooke, W. 1896b. The Popular Religion and Folk-Lore of Northern India, 2 vols. London: Archibald Constable.
- Dumont, Louis. 1970 (1967). Homo Hierarchicus: The Caste System and its Implications. London: Weidenfeld and Nicolson.
- Fuller, C. J. 2016. Colonial Anthropology and the Decline of the Raj: Caste, Religion and Political Change in India in the Early Twentieth Century. Journal of the Royal Asiatic Society 26, 3: 463–86.
- Fuller, C. J. 2022. Ethnography and Racial Theory in the British Raj: The Anthropological Work of H. H. Risley. BEROSE International Encyclopaedia of the Histories of Anthropology, Paris.
- Fuller, C. J. 2023. Colonial Ethnography and Theories of Caste in Late-Nineteenth-Century India. BEROSE International Encyclopaedia of the Histories of Anthropology, Paris.
- Hunter, W. W., ed. 1875-7. A Statistical Account of Bengal, 20 vols. London: Trübner.
- Mandelbaum, David G. 1970. Society in India. Berkeley: University of California Press.
- O’Malley, L. S. S. 1903. Gayā Çrāddha and Gayāwāls. Journal of the Asiatic Society of Bengal 72, pt. 3: 1–11.
- O’Malley, L. S. S. 1906. Gaya (Bengal District Gazetteers, vol. 3). Calcutta: Bengal Secretariat Book Depot.
- O’Malley, L. S. S. 1931. The Indian Civil Service, 1601-1930. London: John Murray.
- O’Malley, L. S. S. 1932. Indian Caste Customs. Cambridge: Cambridge University Press.
- O’Malley, L. S. S. 1934. India’s Social Heritage. Oxford: Clarendon Press.
- O’Malley, L. S. S. 1935. Popular Hinduism: The Religion of the Masses. Cambridge: Cambridge University Press.
- O’Malley, L. S. S.(ed.) 1941. Modern India and the West: A Study of the Interactions of their Civilizations. London: Oxford University Press.
- Parry, Jonathan P. 1994. Death in Banaras. Cambridge: Cambridge University Press.
- Risley, H. H. 1891. The Tribes and Castes of Bengal: Ethnographic Glossary, 2 vols. Calcutta: Bengal Secretariat Press.
- Senart, Émile. 1930 (1896). Caste in India: The Facts and the System (trans. E. Denison Ross). London: Methuen.
- Spear, T. G. P. 1961. British Historical Writing in the Era of the Nationalist Movements, in C. H. Philips, ed., Historians of India, Pakistan and Ceylon, 404-15. London: Oxford University Press.
- Srinivas, M. N. 1996. Social Change in Modern India. Berkeley: University of California Press.

== Census Reports ==
- Census of India, 1911, vol. 1, India, pt. 1, Report, by E. A. Gait. Calcutta, 1913.
- Census of India, 1911, vol. 5, Bengal, Bihar and Orissa and Sikhim, pt. 1, Report, by L. S. S. O’Malley. Calcutta, 1913.
- Census of India, 1911, vol. 15, The United Provinces and Oudh, pt. 1, Report, by E. A. H. Blunt. Allahabad, 1912.
