= List of members of the 1st Provincial Assembly of East Bengal =

1st Provincial Assembly
2nd East Pakistan Provincial Assembly	→
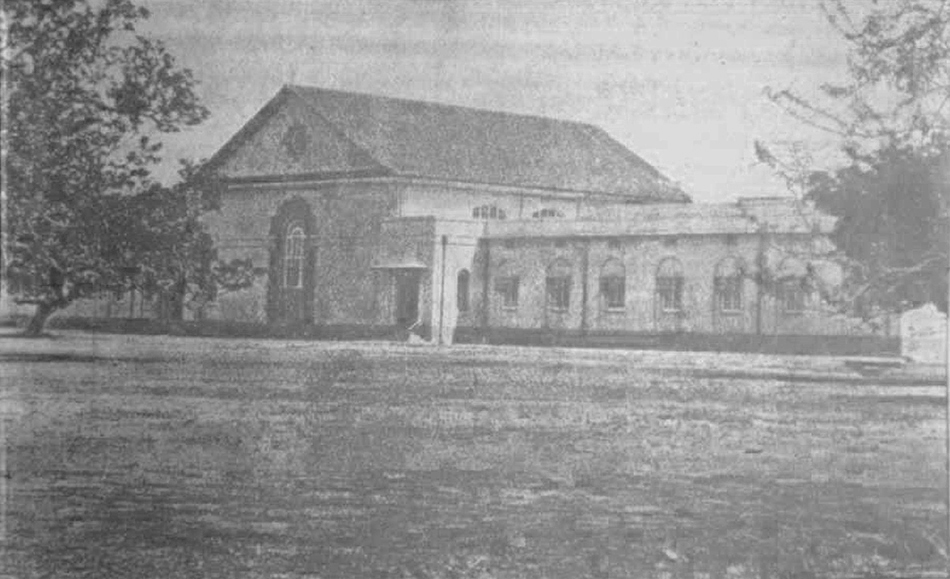
- Assembly House, 1947

Overview
- Legislative body: East Pakistan Provincial Assembly
- Jurisdiction: Pakistan
- Meeting place: Assembly House
- Term: 29 March 1948 – 14 March 1954
- Election: 1946 Bengal Legislative Assembly election
- Government: Second Nazimuddin ministry; Amin ministry

The First Provincial Assembly of East Pakistan was constituted in 1947, around two years after British Bengal's last provincial election. The 1st Provincial Assembly lasted its tenure of around six years and was dissolved on 14 March 1954. The First Session of this Provincial Assembly commenced on 29 March 1948. Total Provincial Assembly seats were 171.

== Provincial Assembly officers ==
#	Position	Name	From	To	Days in office
01	Speaker	Munawwar Ali	29 March 1948	1951	
01	Speaker	Abdul Karim	1951	14 March 1954	
02	Deputy Speaker	Abdul Karim	29 March 1948	1951	
02	Deputy Speaker	Nazmul Haq	1951		
03	Secretary	S. A. E. Hussain			
04	Leader of the House	Khwaja Nazimuddin	15 August 1947	14 March 1954	
04	Leader of the House	Nurul Amin	14 September 1948	14 March 1954	
05	Leader of the Opposition	Basanta Kumar Das	29 March 1948	14 March 1954	

== Members ==
=== General constituencies ===
District/Subdivision	Constituency name	Party	Member	Ref
Municipal	North Bengal Municipal	Pakistan National Congress	Manoranjan Dhar	
Municipal	East Bengal Municipal	Pakistan National Congress	Binod Bihari Chowdhury	
Jessore	Jessore	Unknown	Bijoy Krishna Sarkar	
Khulna	Khulna	Unknown	Gobinda Lal Banerjee	
Rajshahi	Rajshahi	Pakistan Gana Samiti	Prabhas Chandra Lahiri	
Dinajpur	Dinajpur-cum-Rajshahi	Unknown	Vacant	
Rangpur	Rangpur	Unknown	Brojomadhab Das	
Bogra	Bogra-cum-Pabna	Unknown	Suresh Chandra Dasgupta	
Bogra		Unknown	Vacant	
Dacca	Dacca (West)	Unknown	Munindra Nath Bhattacharjee	
Mymensingh	Mymensingh (West)	Unknown	Benode Chandra Chakrabarty	
Mymensingh	Mymensingh (East)	Unknown	Vacant	
Faridpur	Faridpur	Unknown	Vacant	
Bakarganj	Bakarganj (South-West)	Pakistan National Congress	Satindra Nath Sen	
Bakarganj	Bakarganj (North-East)	Pakistan National Congress	Manoranjan Gupta	
Tippera	Tippera	Pakistan Gana Samiti	Dhirendranath Datta	
Noakhali	Noakhali	Unknown	Haran Chandra Ghosh Chowdhury	
Chittagong	Chittagong	Pakistan National Congress	Nellie Sengupta	
Sunamganj	Sunamganj	Unknown	Jatindra Nath Bhadra	
Habiganj	Habiganj (North)	Unknown	Vacant	
Habiganj	Habiganj (South)	Unknown	Nirendra Nath Dev	
South Sylhet	South Sylhet (West)	Unknown	Abala Kanta Gupta	
South Sylhet	South Sylhet (East)	Unknown	Purnendu Kishore Sengupta	
Sylhet Sadar	Sylhet Sadar (South)	Pakistan National Congress	Basanta Kumar Das	
Sylhet Sadar	Sylhet Sadar (North)	Unknown	Gopesh Chandra Pal	
Karimganj	Karimganj	Unknown	Vacant	

=== Scheduled Castes constituencies ===
District/Subdivision	Constituency name	Party	Member	Ref
Kushtia	Kushtia	Unknown	Vacant	
Jessore	Jessore	Unknown	Bhola Nath Biswas	
Khulna	Khulna	Unknown	Rajendra Nath Sarkar	
Khulna	Khulna	Independent politician	Mukunda Behari Mullick	
Dinajpur	Dinajpur-cum-Rajshahi	Unknown	Vacant	
Dinajpur		Unknown	Vacant	
Rangpur	Rangpur	Unknown	Rajani Kanta Ray Barman	
Rangpur	Rangpur	Unknown	Nagendra Narayan Ray	
Bogra	Bogra-cum-Pabna	Unknown	Haran Chandra Barman	
Dacca	Dacca (East)	East Bengal Scheduled Castes Federation	Dhananjoy Roy	
Mymensingh	Mymensingh (West)	Unknown	Gayanath Biswas	
Mymensingh	Mymensingh (East)	Unknown	Prafulla Ranjan Sarkar	
Faridpur	Faridpur	East Bengal Scheduled Castes Federation	Dwarikanath Barori	
Faridpur	Faridpur	Unknown	Manohar Dhali	
Bakarganj	Bakarganj (South-West)	East Bengal Scheduled Castes Federation	Lalit Kumar Bal	
Tippera	Tippera	Unknown	Jogendra Chandra Das	
Sunamganj	Sunamganj	East Bengal Scheduled Castes Federation	Akshay Kumar Das	
Habiganj	Habiganj (North)	Unknown	Jagabandhu Sircar	
Karimganj	Karimganj	Unknown	Balaram Sircar	

=== Muslim constituencies ===
District/Subdivision	Constituency name	Party	Member	Ref
Dacca	Dacca Municipal	Unknown	Khwaja Nasrullah	
Kushtia	Kushtia	Muslim League	Shamsuddin Ahmed	
Meherpur	Meherpur	Unknown	Abdul Hannan	
Chuadanga	Chuadanga	Muslim League	Nawajesh Ahmed	
Jessore	Jessore Sadar	Unknown	Lutfar Rahman	
Jessore	Jessore (East)	Unknown	Vacant	
Jessore	Jessore (West)	Unknown	Vacant	
Jhenidah	Jhenidah	Unknown	Tofazzel Hossain	
Khulna	Khulna	Muslim League	Khan A Sabur	
Satkhira	Satkhira	Unknown	Abdul Ahad	
Bagerhat	Bagerhat	Unknown	Md. Mozammel Hossain	
Natore	Natore	Unknown	Kazi Abul Masud	
Rajshahi	Rajshahi (North)	Unknown	Maniruddin Akhand	
Rajshahi	Rajshahi (South)	Muslim League	Abdul Hamid	
Rajshahi	Rajshahi (Central)	Muslim League	Madar Bux	
Rajshahi	Rajshahi (West)	Unknown	Vacant	
Thakurgaon	Thakurgaon	Unknown	Hafizuddin Choudhuri	
Dinajpur	Dinajpur (Central East)	Unknown	Vacant	
Dinajpur	Dinajpur-cum-Thakurgaon	Muslim League	Hassan Ali	
Nilphamari	Nilphamari	Muslim League	Khairat Hossain	
Rangpur	Rangpur (North)	Unknown	Mahammad Owais	
Rangpur	Rangpur (South)	Unknown	Emaduddin Ahamad	
Kurigram	Kurigram (North)	Muslim League	Paniruddin Ahmad	
Kurigram	Kurigram (South)	Unknown	Nazir Hossain Khandkar	
Gaibandha	Gaibandha (North)	Unknown	Serajuddin Ahmed	
Gaibandha	Gaibandha (South)	Muslim League	Ahmed Hossain	
Bogra	Bogra (East)	Unknown	Badiuzzaman Muhammad Elias	
Bogra	Bogra (South)	Unknown	Mohammad Ishaque	
Bogra	Bogra (North)	Unknown	Mobarak Ali Ahmed	
Bogra	Bogra (West)	Unknown	Vacant	
Bogra	Bogra (North-West)	Unknown	Muzaffar Rahman Chowdhury	
Pabna	Pabna (East)	Unknown	Vacant	
Pabna	Pabna (West)	Unknown	Vacant	
Serajganj	Serajganj (South)	Unknown	Abdur Raschid Mahmood	
Serajganj	Serajganj (North)	Unknown	Md. Osman Gani	
Serajganj	Serajganj (Central)	Muslim League	Abdur Rashid Tarkabagish	
Narayanganj	Narayanganj (South)	Unknown	M Osman Ali	
Narayanganj	Narayanganj (East)	Unknown	Mahammad Abdul Aziz	
Narayanganj	Narayanganj (North)	Muslim League	Syed Abdus Salim	
Munshiganj	Munshiganj	Muslim League	Abdul Hakim Bikrampuri	
Dacca	Dacca South (Central)	Unknown	Abdul Khaliq	
Dacca	Dacca (North Central)	Muslim League	Fakir Abdul Mannan	
Dacca	Dacca (Central)	Unknown	Vacant	
Manikganj	Manikganj (East)	Unknown	Aulad Hossain Khan	
Manikganj	Manikganj (West)	Muslim League	Masihuddin Ahmad	
Jamalpur	Jamalpur (East)	Muslim League	Fazlur Rahman	
Jamalpur	Jamalpur (North)	Unknown	Abdul Karim	
Jamalpur	Jamalpur (West)	Unknown	A. K. M. Bafatuddin Talukdar	
Jamalpur	Jamalpur-cum-Muktagacha	Unknown	Mir Ahammad Ali	
Mymensingh	Mymensingh (North)	Unknown	Sharfuddin Ahmad	
Mymensingh	Mymensingh (East)	Muslim League	Nurul Amin	
Mymensingh	Mymensingh (South)	Unknown	Shamsul Huda Panchbagi	
Mymensingh	Mymensingh (West)	Unknown	Vacant	
Tangail	Tangail (South)	Unknown	Vacant	
Tangail	Tangail (West)	Unknown	Mirza Abdul Hafiz	
Tangail	Tangail (North)	Unknown	Vacant	
Netrakona	Netrakona (South)	Unknown	Asan Ali Muktear	
Netrakona	Netrakona (North)	Unknown	Akbar Ali	
Kishoreganj	Kishoreganj (South)	Unknown	Md. Israil	
Kishoreganj	Kishoreganj (North)	Unknown	Syed Habibul Huq	
Kishoreganj	Kishoreganj (East)	Unknown	Hamiduddin Ahmad Khan	
Gopalganj	Gopalganj	Muslim League	Khandokar Shams Uddin Ahmed	
Goalundo	Goalundo	Muslim League	Yusuf Ali Chowdhury	
Faridpur	Faridpur (West)	Unknown	Yusuf Hossain Choudhury	
Faridpur	Faridpur (East)	Unknown	Chowdhury Shamsuddin Ahmed	
Madaripur	Madaripur (West)	Unknown	Eskandar Ali Khan	
Madaripur	Madaripur (East)	Unknown	Vacant	
Patuakhali	Patuakhali (North)	Unknown	Abdur Rahman Khan	
Patuakhali	Patuakhali (South)	Unknown	Shamsuddin Sikder	
Pirojpur	Pirojpur (South)	Krishak Praja Party	Hatem Ali Jamadar	
Pirojpur	Pirojpur (North)	Muslim League	Syed Muhammad Afzal	
Bakarganj	Bakarganj (North)	Unknown	Mohammad Ariff Chaudhury	
Bakarganj	Bakarganj (South)	Unknown	Vacant	
Bakarganj	Bakarganj (West)	Unknown	Hazi Muhammad Quasem	
Bhola	Bhola (North)	Unknown	Nuruzzaman	
Bhola	Bhola (South)	Unknown	Syed Azizur Rahman	
Brahmanbaria	Brahmanbaria (North)	Unknown	Mohammad Ruknuddin	
Brahmanbaria	Brahmanbaria (South)	Unknown	Ali Ahmed Khan	
Tippera	Tippera (North-East)	Muslim League	Tafazzal Ali	
Tippera	Tippera (North)	Muslim League	Mafizuddin Ahmad	
Tippera	Tippera (West)	Unknown	Nawab Ali	
Tippera	Tippera (Central)	Unknown	Abdul Momin	
Tippera	Tippera (South)	Unknown	Syed Serajul Haque	
Chandpur	Chandpur (East)	Unknown	Janab Ali Majumdar	
Chandpur	Chandpur (West)	Unknown	Abidur Reza Chowdhury	
Matlab bazzar	Matlab bazzar	Unknown	Muhammad Abdus Salam	
Noakhali	Noakhali (North)	Muslim League	Fazlur Rahman	
Noakhali	Noakhali (Central)	Unknown	Mujibur Rahman	
Noakhali	Noakhali (South)	Unknown	Abdul Hai	
Ramaganj	Ramaganj-cum-Raipur	Unknown	Fazul Karim	
Noakhali (West)	Noakhali (West)	Unknown	Abdul Hakim Mia	
Feni	Feni	Unknown	Habibullah Bahar Chowdhury	
Cox's Bazar	Cox's Bazar	Unknown	Kabir Ahmed Choudhury	
Chittagong	Chittagong (South)	Unknown	Ahmed Kabir Choudhury	
Chittagong	Chittagong (South Central)	Unknown	Ali Ahmed Choudhury	
Chittagong	Chittagong (North-East)	Unknown	Farid Ahmad Choudhury	
Chittagong	Chittagong (North-West)	Unknown	Vacant	
Sunamganj	Sunamganj (West)	Unknown	Abdul Khaleque Ahmed	
Sunamganj	Sunamganj (Central)	Unknown	Vacant	
Sunamganj	Sunamganj (East)	Unknown	Mohammad Mafiz Chaudhury	
Sunamganj	Sunamganj (South)	Unknown	Vacant	
Habiganj	Habiganj (North-West)	Unknown	Nurul Hussain Khan	
Habiganj	Habiganj (North-East)	Unknown	Mudabbir Hussain Chaudhury	
Habiganj	Habiganj (South-West)	Unknown	Nasiruddin Ahmed	
Habiganj	Habiganj (South-East)	Unknown	Muhammad Abdullah	
South Sylhet	South Sylhet (West)	Unknown	Mayeenuddin Ahmed Chaudhury	
South Sylhet	South Sylhet (Central)	Muslim League	Dewan Abdul Basith	
South Sylhet	South Sylhet (East)	Unknown	Ali Haider Khan	
Sylhet Sadar	Sylhet Sadar (Central)	Muslim League	Abdul Hamid	
Sylhet Sadar	Sylhet Sadar (North)	Jamiat Ulema-e-Islam	Ibrahim Chatuli	
Sylhet Sadar	Sylhet Sadar (West)	Unknown	Dewan Taimur Raja Chowdhury	
Sylhet Sadar	Sylhet Sadar (East)	Unknown	Abdur Rasheed	
Sylhet Sadar	Sylhet Sadar (South)	Muslim League	Dewan Abdur Rab Choudhury	
Karimganj	Karimganj (West)	Unknown	Idris Ali	
Karimganj	Karimganj (Central)	Unknown	Abdul Latif	

=== Women's constituencies ===
District/Subdivision	Constituency name	Party	Member	Ref
Dacca	Dacca (General)	Pakistan National Congress	Ashalata Sen	
Dacca	Dacca (Muhammadan)	Muslim League	Anwara Khatun	

=== Other constituencies ===
Group	Constituency name	Party	Member	Ref
Indian Christian	Dacca	Unknown	R. A. Gomes	
Planting	East Bengal Planting	Unknown	Vacant	
Landholders	Rajshahi Landholders	Unknown	Narendra Singh Singhi	
Landholders	Dacca Landholders	Unknown	Vacant	
Landholders	Chittagong Landholders	Unknown	Vacant	
Labour	Railway Trade Union	Unknown	Vacant	
Labour	Water Transport Trade Union	Unknown	Vacant	
Labour	Srimongal Sylhet	Unknown	Sujit Jiban Santal	
University	Dacca University	Unknown	Vacant	

== Former members ==
1. Ibrahim Khan from Tangail South Muslim (1947–1948)
2. Abdul Hamid Khan Bhashani from Tangail South Muslim (1948)
3. Abul Kalam Shamsuddin from Mymensingh West Muslim (1947–1952)
4. Mohammad Ali Bogra from Bogra West Muslim (1947–1949)
5. Munawwar Ali from Sunamganj Center (1947–1951)
