= Kamran Hossain Chowdhury =

Bangladeshi politician (1952–2024)

- কামরান হোসেন চৌধুরী
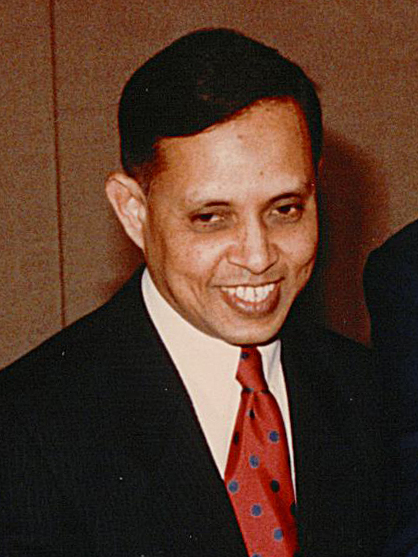
- Chowdhury in 1997

Member of the Bangladesh Parliament for Faridpur-3
- In office 15 April 1988 – 6 December 1990
- Preceded by: Mohabbat Jan Chowdhury
- Succeeded by: Chowdhury Kamal Ibne Yusuf

Personal details
- Born: 24 July 1952 Faridpur District, East Bengal, Pakistan
- Died: 4 December 2024 (aged 72) Dhaka, Bangladesh
- Party: Jatiya Party
- Spouse: Shushmita Amin
- Children: Umran; Ayman
- Parents: Shamsuddin Chowdhury (father); Halima Chishti (mother)

Kamran Hossain Chowdhury (24 July 1952 – 4 December 2024) was a Bangladeshi politician who was a Jatiya Sangsad member of Jatiya Party representing the Faridpur-3 constituency during 1988–1990. He was a member of the parliamentary standing committee on foreign relations and the chairman of Faridpur District Council. He was a member of the Jatiya Party’s Diplomatic Cell and International Affairs Secretary in one faction of the party.

== Early life ==
Kamran Hossain Chowdhury was born in Amirabad Estate, Faridpur, on 24 July 1952 to Shamsuddin Chowdhury and Halima Chishti. Shamsuddin was the son of a zamindar and studied at Islamia College in Calcutta during the British Raj. Shamsuddin lived in Baker Hostel with Sheikh Mujibur Rahman. He was a distant nephew of Chowdhury Abdallah Zaheeruddin, who represented Faridpur in the Bengal Legislative Council, and Yusuf Ali Chowdhury, a member of the Bengal Legislative Assembly. Halima was the daughter of a magistrate who worked in different parts of Bengal throughout his career, including in Calcutta in the 1940s and Faridpur in the 1950s. Her brother, Major General Nazirul Aziz Chishti, was the principal staff officer of the Bangladesh Armed Forces. While Kamran was young, his home in Faridpur was visited by notable Bengali Muslim politicians, including A. K. Fazlul Huq and Huseyn Shaheed Suhrawardy.

Chowdhury studied at the Residential Model School and Notre Dame College at Dhaka in the then East Pakistan.

== Career ==
Chowdhury was elected to parliament representing Faridpur-3 constituency in 1988. In parliament, he was a member of the parliamentary standing committee on foreign relations. The committee supported the first dispatch of Bangladesh UN Peacekeeping Forces, as well as deploying Bangladeshi troops to the Gulf War. He also served as chairman of the Faridpur District Council. During his tenure, the River Research Institute was established in Faridpur with Dutch government funding. A road from Goalundo Ghat to Jessore via Faridpur was also built in 1990. During the 1988 floods, President H M Ershad flew to Faridpur by helicopter to oversee relief operations coordinated by Chowdhury and the army.

Chowdhury was the vice president of the Japan-Bangladesh Parliamentary Association. The association played a key role in mobilizing aid for the construction of the Jamuna Bridge. As a member of the fourth parliament, Chowdhury had to vote for the 8th, 9th, and 10th Amendments to the Constitution of Bangladesh. After the fall of Ershad, Chowdhury was a member of the Diplomatic Cell of the Jatiya Party in the 1990s, as well as International Affairs Secretary in one faction of the party from 2001 to 2008. Chowdhury and his family were royal guests in the Kingdom of Saudi Arabia in 1996.

Chowdhury worked with Castrol and the Bank of Credit and Commerce International (BCCI).

== Personal life and death ==
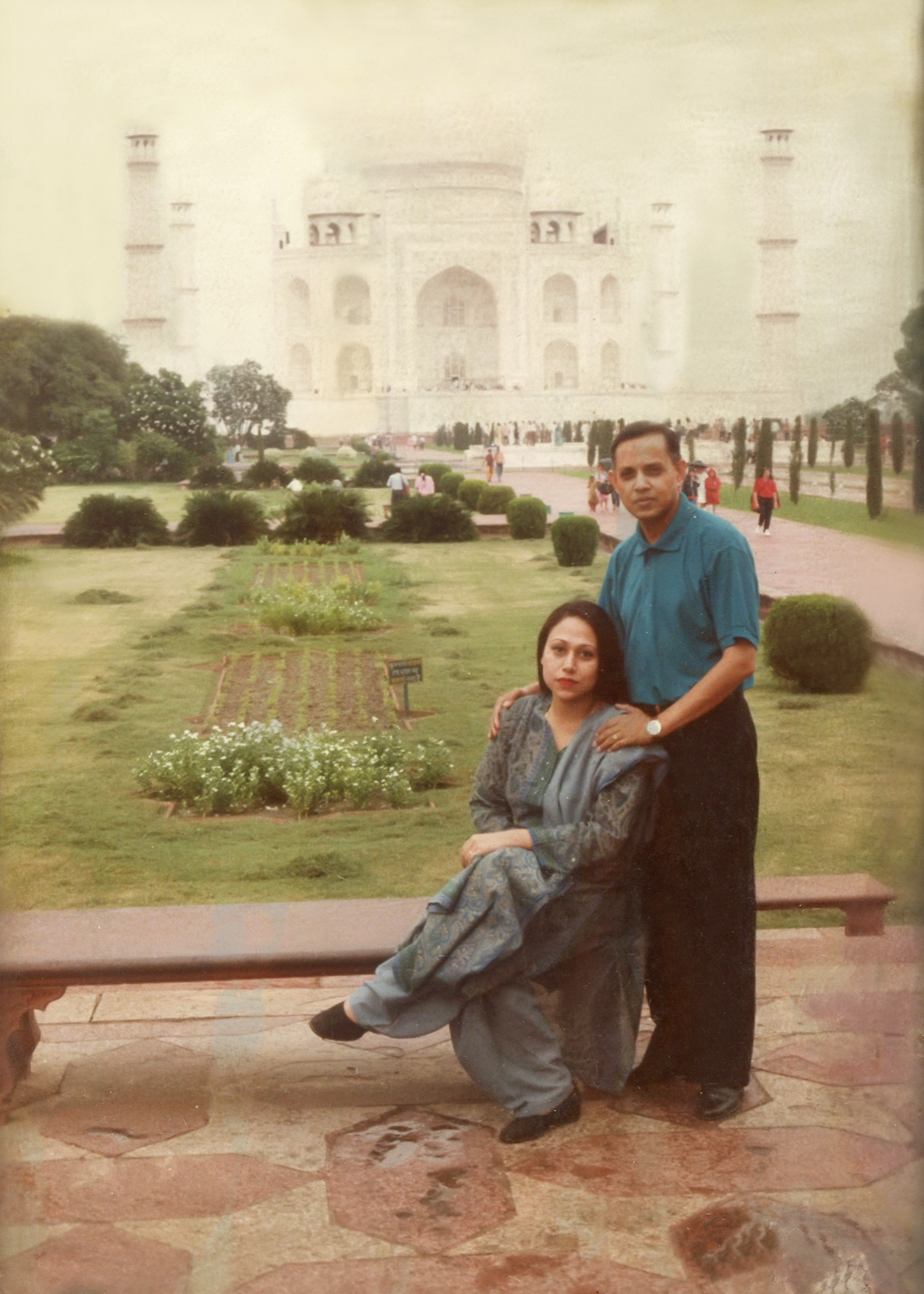
Chowdhury and his wife, Shusmita, at Tajmahal, Agra (1997)

Chowdhury was married to Shusmita Amin Chowdhury (Dina) (d. 2022), a Dhaka socialite, English teacher, and Rabindra Sangeet singer. She was the eldest daughter of Nurul Amin Khan, a former managing director of the Jamuna Oil Company and a niece of Nurul Momen Khan Mihir (d. 1992), the first Director-General of National Security Intelligence, Abdur Raquib Khandaker, a former Inspector General of Police, and Niaz Mahmood Khan (Bobby), an independence activist.

Chowdhury and Shusmita had two sons, Umran Chowdhury, a lawyer, historian, and columnist, and Ayman Chowdhury.

Chowdhury's elder brother, Imran Hossain Chowdhury, was the first elected chairman of the Faridpur Sadar Upazila.

Chowdhury died from heart disease on 4 December 2024, at the age of 72.
