= Nayab Yusuf Ahmed =

Bangladeshi politician

- নায়াব ইউসুফ

Member of the Bangladesh Parliament for Faridpur-3
- Incumbent
- Assumed office 17 February 2026
- Preceded by: Abdul Kader Azad

Personal details
- Born: 3 February 1970 (age 56)
- Party: Bangladesh Nationalist Party
- Relations: Chowdhury Akmal Ibne Yusuf (uncle); Yusuf Ali Chowdhury (grandfather); Chowdhury Moyezuddin Biwshash (great-grandfather)
- Parent: Chowdhury Kamal Ibne Yusuf (father)

Nayab Yusuf Ahmed (known as Nayab Yusuf; born 3 February 1970) is a Bangladeshi politician. She is an elected Member of Parliament from the Faridpur-3 constituency. She is a member of the Bishwas Estate of Faridpur. She was one of the seven women who won in the 13th Jatiya Sangsad election in 2026.

== Background and family ==
Nayab Yusuf was the eldest daughter of Chowdhury Kamal Ibne Yusuf (1940–2020) and Shaila Kamal (d. 2025). Chowdhury Kamal was a vice-president of Bangladesh Nationalist Party (BNP), a three-term Jatiya Sangsad member and a minister of food, disaster management and relief. She has a brother, Chowdhury Saud Yusuf.

== Career ==
Yusuf is a member of the National Executive Committee of BNP and Faridpur Divisional Co-Organizing Secretary.

== Personal life ==
Yusuf is divorced. She has a son.
