= Syed Qumrul Islam Saleh Uddin =

Bangladeshi politician (died 1983)

Syed Kamrul Islam Mohammad Salehuddin
- সৈয়দ কামরুল ইসলাম মোহাম্মদ সালেহউদ্দিন

Member of the 1st Jatiya Sangsad
- In office 1973–1975
- Preceded by: Position established
- Succeeded by: Sirajul Islam Mridha

Personal details
- Born: 2 July 1937 Tita, Gopalganj, Faridpur district, Bengal Presidency
- Died: 24 May 1983 (aged 45) PG Hospital, Dhaka, Bangladesh
- Party: Awami League
- Relatives: Shah Ali Baghdadi
- Education: Michael Madhusudan College (BA)

Syed Kamrul Islam Mohammad Salehuddin (Bengali: সৈয়দ কামরুল ইসলাম মোহাম্মদ সালেহউদ্দিন; 2 July 1937 – 24 May 1983), also known by his nickname Jangu, was a Bangladeshi politician, language veteran, freedom fighter, parliamentarian, and social worker. He was elected a member of the National Assembly of Pakistan in 1970 from the Awami League for Faridpur-II. He also was a member of the Constituent Assembly of Bangladesh in 1972. He served as a member of parliament for Faridpur-3 from 1973 to 1979.

== Early life and family ==
Salehuddin was born on 2 July 1937 in his maternal home at Tita in Gopalganj, then part of the Bengal Presidency's Faridpur district. He belonged to a Bengali Muslim family of Syeds in the village of Banamalidia in Madhukhali. The family was descended from Shah Syed Habibullah Maddan-e-Khoda, who was a nephew of Shah Ali Baghdadi. Habibullah and his father, Shah Husayn Tegh-Burhana, had migrated from Baghdad to Delhi in the 15th century, and eventually settled in Gerda, Faridpur. Habibullah moved from Gerda to Banamalidia, where he is buried in a mazar (mausoleum). Salehuddin was the eldest child of Syed Mohammad Abdul Halim and Saleha Khatun. His father was a member of the civil service and recipient of the Tamgha-e-Quaid-e-Azam, whilst Khatun was the daughter of Ahmad Hossain Khan, a former zamindar of Tita.

== Personal life ==
Salehuddin married Dil Afroze Begum (Dolly), the eldest daughter of civil servant Md. Sirajul Haq of Khulna. Their only son Dr.Syed Zaved Mohammad Salehuddin is the Founder of Bengal University, Gazipur and also an advocate at the Bangladesh Supreme Court and former teacher at Jahangirnagar University. They also have a daughter named Syeda Farzana Salehuddin (Dipa).

== Education ==
Salehuddin was due to matriculate from the Brojomohun Institute in 1952, but was arrested for participating in a Bengali language movement protest in Barisal. After being released from prison, he matriculated from Brojomohun Institute in 1953. In 1956, Salehuddin completed his Intermediate of Arts from the Prafulla Chandra College in Bagerhat. He then enrolled at the Michael Madhusudan College in Jessore, where he graduated with a Bachelor of Arts in 1959 from jail. Salehuddin was called to the bar from the Honourable Society of the Inner Temple in 1968.

== Career ==
Salehuddin took part the language movement and was convicted for one year in 1952.

Salehuddin was a member of the communist party.

Salehuddin stood for the National Assembly of Pakistan as an Awami League candidate in the 1970 Pakistani general election. He was elected for Faridpur-II by a large margin over three opponents, including Pakistan Democratic Party candidate Abdus Salam Khan.

Salehuddin was a member of the Constituent Assembly of Bangladesh in 1972.

Salehuddin was elected to the Bangladesh Parliament in 1973 from Faridpur-3.

Salehuddin formed a political party named the Bangladesh Justice Party in 1981.

== Death ==
Salehuddin died on 24 May 1983 at PG Hospital in Dhaka. He is buried at Banani Graveyard in Dhaka, Bangladesh. A private technical college under the Bangladesh Technical Education Board named Barrister Syed Kamrul Islam Mohammad Salehuddin Technical College was established in 2019 at Bonomalidia, Madhukhali under Faridpur district.
