= Chowdhury Kamal Ibne Yusuf =

Bangladeshi politician (1940–2020)

Chowdhury Kamal Ibne Yousuf
- চৌধুরী কামাল ইবনে ইউসুফ

Minister of Food and Disaster Management
- In office 6 May 2004 – 27 October 2006
- Preceded by: Position created
- Succeeded by: Mohammad Abdur Razzaque

Minister of Disaster Management and Relief
- In office 10 October 2001 – 6 May 2004
- Succeeded by: Position abolished

Member of the Bangladesh Parliament for Faridpur-3
- In office 20 March 1991 – 27 October 2006
- Preceded by: Kamran Hossain Chowdhury
- Succeeded by: Khandaker Mosharraf Hossain

Personal details
- Born: 1940 Bangladesh
- Died: 9 December 2020 (aged 79–80) Dhaka, Bangladesh
- Party: Bangladesh Nationalist Party
- Children: 4 including Nayab Yusuf Ahmed
- Parent: Yusuf Ali Chowdhury (father)
- Relatives: Chowdhury Moyezuddin Biwshash (grandfather); Chowdhury Abd-Allah Zaheeruddin (uncle); Chowdhury Akmal Ibne Yusuf (brother)

Chowdhury Kamal Ibne Yousuf (1940 – 9 December 2020) was a Bangladeshi politician who served as government minister.

He was a leader of Bangladesh Nationalist Party.

== Family ==
Kamal was born into a Bengali Zamindar family from Faridpur district. Their zamindari originated at the Amirabad Estate, Faridpur. His grandfather was the zamindar Chowdhury Moyezuddin Biwshash. His father, Yusuf Ali Chowdhury (Mohan Mia), was a Muslim League leader during British rule and in Pakistan. His uncle Chowdhury Abdallah Zaheeruddin (Lal Mia) had been a cabinet minister in the government of President Ayub Khan while another uncle, Enayet Hossain Chowdhury, became a member of the National Assembly of Pakistan.

== Career ==
Kamal joined the Bangladesh Nationalist Party (BNP) led by President Ziaur Rahman after the party's formation in 1979. He was elected to parliament in the 1979 election. In 1981, he was inducted as a minister in the government of President Justice Abdus Sattar. In 1991, he was elected again and was made a Minister for Health in the cabinet of Prime Minister Begum Khaleda Zia. He won the general elections in 1996 even though the BNP lost power to the Awami League. BNP won the 2001 elections after which he was made Minister for Food and Disaster Management. He lost his seat in the 2008 general elections. He was the vice-chairman of BNP.

== Personal life and death ==
Kamal had 4 daughters including Nayab Yusuf Ahmed. He died from COVID-19 at Evercare Hospital Dhaka on 9 December 2020.
