= Faridpur-3 =

Constituency of Bangladesh's Jatiya Sangsad

Coordinates: 23.61°N 89.84°E

- Constituency for the Jatiya Sangsad
- District: Faridpur District
- Division: Dhaka Division
- Electorate: 432,628 (2026)

Current constituency
- Created: 1973
- Party: Bangladesh Nationalist Party
- Member: Nayab Yusuf Ahmed
- ← 212 Faridpur-2 214 Faridpur-4 →

Faridpur-3 is a constituency represented in the Jatiya Sangsad (National Parliament) of Bangladesh since 2026 by Nayab Yusuf Ahmed of the Bangladesh Nationalist Party.

== Boundaries ==
The constituency encompasses Faridpur Sadar Upazila.

== History ==
The constituency was created for the first general elections in newly independent Bangladesh, held in 1973.

Ahead of the 2008 general election, the Election Commission redrew constituency boundaries to reflect population changes revealed by the 2001 Bangladesh census. The 2008 redistricting altered the boundaries of the constituency.

== Members of Parliament ==
Election	Member	Party
1973	Syed Qumrul Islam Saleh Uddin	Independent
1979	Sirajul Islam Mridha	Bangladesh Nationalist Party
Major Boundary Changes
1986	Mohabbat Jan Chowdhury	Bangladesh Krishak Sramik Awami League
1988	Kamran Hossain Chowdhury	Jatiya Party
1991	Chowdhury Kamal Ibne Yusuf	Bangladesh Nationalist Party
Feb 1996	Chowdhury Kamal Ibne Yusuf	Bangladesh Nationalist Party
Jun 1996	Chowdhury Kamal Ibne Yusuf	Bangladesh Nationalist Party
2001	Chowdhury Kamal Ibne Yusuf	Bangladesh Nationalist Party
2008	Khandaker Mosharraf Hossain	Awami League
2014	Khandaker Mosharraf Hossain	Awami League
2018	Khandaker Mosharraf Hossain	Awami League
2024	Abdul Kader Azad	Independent
2026	Nayab Yusuf Ahmed	Bangladesh Nationalist Party

== Elections ==
=== Elections in the 2020s ===
General Election 2026: Faridpur-3
Party	Candidate	Votes	%	±%
BNP	Nayab Yusuf Ahmed	148,545	53.2	N/A
Jamaat	Md. Abdul Tawab	124,115	44.5	N/A
IAB	KM Sarwar	4,022	1.4	N/A
Independent	Morshedul Islam Asif	1,253	0.4	N/A
CPB	Md. Rafiquzzaman Mia	957	0.3	N/A
JSD (Rab)	Arifa Akter Baby	251	0.1	N/A
Majority		24,430	8.8	N/A
Turnout		279,143	64.5	N/A
BNP gain from Independent				

=== Elections in the 2010s ===
Khandaker Mosharraf Hossain was re-elected unopposed in the 2014 general election after opposition parties withdrew their candidacies in a boycott of the election.

=== Elections in the 2000s ===
General Election 2008: Faridpur-3
Party	Candidate	Votes	%	±%
AL	Khandaker Mosharraf Hossain	122,047	52.8	+15.6
Independent	Chowdhury Kamal Ibne Yusuf	76,478	33.1	N/A
Jamaat	Ali Ahsan Mohammad Mojaheed	30,821	13.3	N/A
IAB	Khandoker Wahiduzzman	1,455	0.6	N/A
Gano Forum	Bashijet Kumar Ganguly	375	0.2	N/A
Majority		45,569	19.7	−4.4
Turnout		231,176	86.4	+8.9
AL gain from BNP				

General Election 2001: Faridpur-3
Party	Candidate	Votes	%	±%
BNP	Chowdhury Kamal Ibne Yusuf	114,618	61.3	+21.9
AL	Khandaker Mosharraf Hossain	69,544	37.2	+8.4
IJOF	Sanjiban Kumar Saha	1,734	0.9	N/A
Independent	M. A. Karim	405	0.2	N/A
CPB	Abu Md. Mokhlesur Rahman	278	0.1	N/A
Desh Prem Party	Marshal Shah Alam	234	0.1	N/A
Independent	Kazi Joinal Abedin	130	0.1	N/A
Independent	Md. Khorsedul Alam Siraj	26	0.0	N/A
Majority		45,074	24.1	+13.6
Turnout		186,969	77.5	−5.3
BNP hold				

=== Elections in the 1990s ===
General Election June 1996: Faridpur-3
Party	Candidate	Votes	%	±%
BNP	Chowdhury Kamal Ibne Yusuf	60,779	39.4	−7.6
AL	Khandaker Mosharraf Hossain	44,511	28.8	+3.5
JP(E)	Imran Hossain Chowdhury	25,547	16.6	+14.7
Jamaat	Ali Ahsan Mohammad Mojaheed	12,334	8.0	−4.4
Zaker Party	A.H.M. Nazmul Huda	10,086	6.5	−4.1
IOJ	Md. Motahar Hossain Mamun	544	0.4	N/A
Jatiya Janata Party (Nurul Islam)	Syed Harun Ar Rashid	280	0.2	N/A
Bangladesh Muslim League (Jamir Ali)	Sikdar Maqim Uddin Ahmed	147	0.1	N/A
Independent	Md. Farid Hossain Siddiqi	107	0.1	N/A
Majority		16,268	10.5	−11.2
Turnout		154,335	82.8	+17.4
BNP hold				

General Election 1991: Faridpur-3
Party	Candidate	Votes	%	±%
BNP	Chowdhury Kamal Ibne Yusuf	62,432	47.0	
AL	Imam Uddin Ahmmad	33,653	25.3	
Jamaat	Ali Ahsan Mohammad Mojaheed	16,502	12.4	
Zaker Party	Abdul Mannan Molla	14,111	10.6	
JP(E)	Saiful Islam Nilu	2,505	1.9	
Bangladesh Janata Party	K. M. Obaidur Rahman	1,871	1.4	
JSD	A. Razzak Molla	1,028	0.8	
Bangladesh Freedom League	Belayet Hossein	602	0.5	
Independent	Md. Kausar Ahmmed	134	0.1	
Majority		28,779	21.7	
Turnout		132,838	65.4	
BNP gain from JP(E)				
