= Khandaker Nurul Islam =

Bangladeshi politician

- খন্দকার নুরুল ইসলাম

Member of the Bangladesh Parliament for Faridpur-2
- In office 1973–1979
- Preceded by: Position created
- Succeeded by: Md. Abdul Matin Mia

Personal details
- Died: 11 July 2001 Bangladesh
- Party: Bangladesh Awami League
- Children: Khandaker Mosharraf Hossain
- Relatives: Saima Wazed (granddaughter-in-law); Md. Habibe Millat (grandson-in-law)

Khandaker Nurul Islam (also known as Nuru Mia; died 11 July 2001) was a Bangladeshi politician and lawyer. He was a member of the country's first National Parliament as a member of the Awami League from the Faridpur-2 constituency.

== Early life and education ==
Nurul Islam was born into a Bengali Muslim family of Khandakars in Faridpur. His father's name was Khandaker Abdul Barik. Nurul Islam had Bachelor of Laws and Master of Arts degrees. Sheikh Mujibur Rahman was his maternal cousin, thus making him a member of the Sheikh–Wazed family.

== Career ==
Nurul Islam contested in the 1970 Pakistani general election as an Awami League candidate, and successfully won a seat in the NE-106 (Dacca-III) constituency. However, the assembly was not formed and later led to the Bangladesh Liberation War. During the first set of elections in the newly-established country in 1973, Nurul Islam preserved his seat in the Jatiya Sangsad as a Bangladesh Awami League candidate from Faridpur-2.

== Death and legacy ==
Nurul Islam died on 11 July 2001 in Bangladesh. He was married to Hasina Momtaz and their son, Khandaker Mosharraf Hossain, is a parliamentarian and former minister. Their other son, Khandaker Mohtesham Hossain, is the chairman of the Faridpur Sadar Upazila Council. His grandson (son of Khandaker Mosharraf Hossain) is married to Saima Wazed, granddaughter of his cousin Sheikh Mujibur Rahman and daughter of Sheikh Hasina.
