= Abdul Kader Azad =

Bangladeshi politician

A. K. Azad
- এ. কে. আজাদ
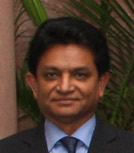
- Azad in 2012

Member of Parliament
- In office 29 January 2024 – 6 August 2024
- Preceded by: Khandaker Mosharraf Hossain
- Succeeded by: Nayab Yusuf Ahmed
- Constituency: Faridpur-3

Personal details
- Born: 31 December 1959 (age 66) Faridpur, Bangladesh
- Party: Independent
- Education: University of Dhaka
- Occupation: Chairman, CEO & Managing Director of Ha-meem Group

Abdul Kader Azad, also known as A.K. Azad, is a Bangladeshi businessman and former politician. He is the chairman, CEO, and managing director of Ha-meem Group and a former Member of Parliament representing the Faridpur-3 constituency.

== Career ==
Azad is a businessman, industrialist, and former politician. He is the managing director of Ha-meem Group of Companies.

On 7 January 2024 he was elected as Member of Parliament from Faridpur-3 constituency as an independent.
