= Khandaker Mosharraf Hossain (born 1942) =

Bangladeshi politician

- খন্দকার মোশাররফ হোসেন
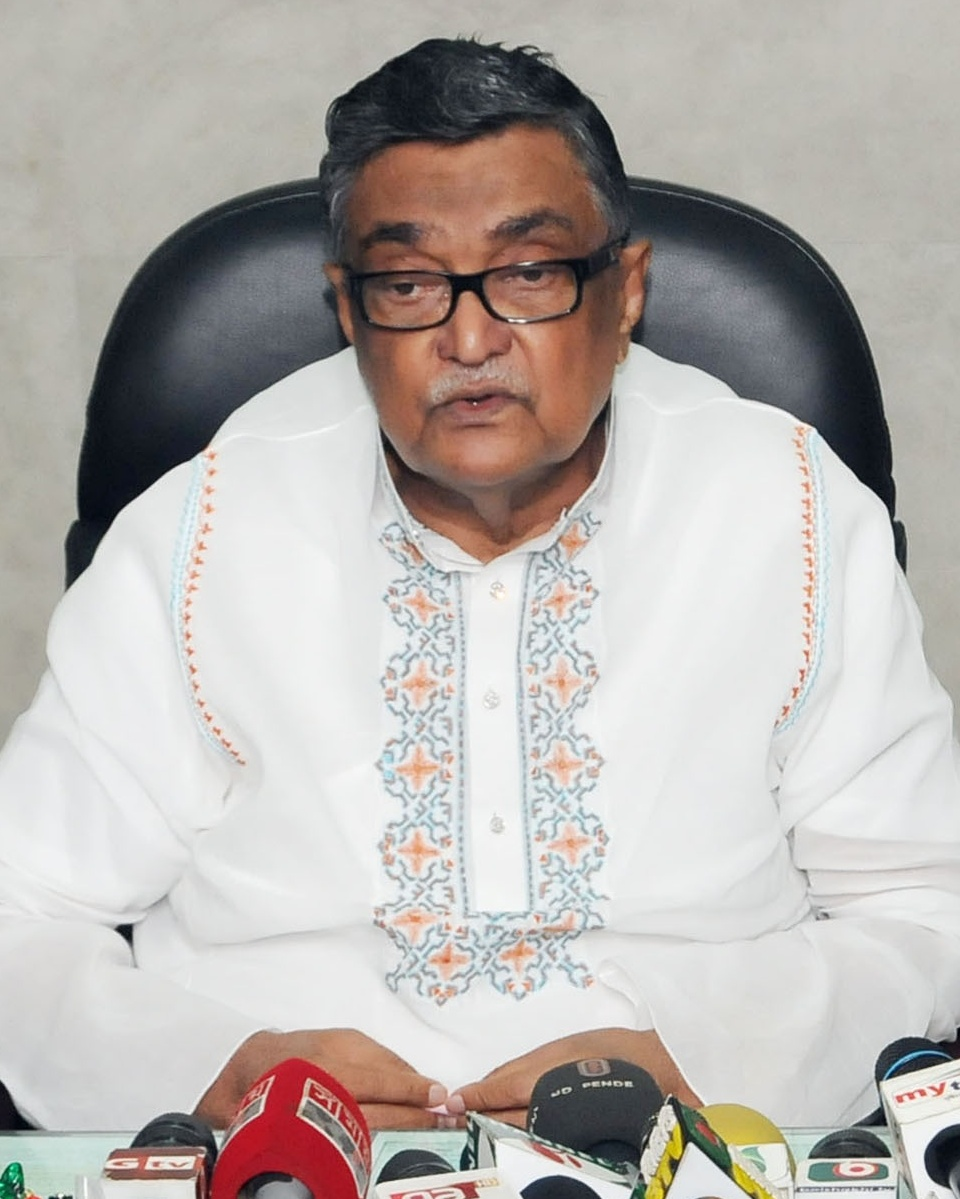
- Hossain in 2015

Member of Parliament
- In office 25 January 2009 – 29 January 2024
- Preceded by: Chowdhury Kamal Ibne Yusuf
- Succeeded by: A. K. Azad
- Constituency: Faridpur-3

Minister of Local Government and Rural Development and Co-operative
- In office 9 July 2015 – 7 January 2019
- Preceded by: Sayed Ashraful Islam
- Succeeded by: Md. Tajul Islam

Minister of Expatriates' Welfare and Overseas Employment
- In office 16 September 2012 – 24 January 2014
- Succeeded by: Nurul Islam

Minister of Labour and Employment
- In office 6 January 2009 – 16 September 2012
- Preceded by: Abdullah Al Noman
- Succeeded by: Rajiuddin Ahmed Raju

Personal details
- Born: 25 September 1942 (age 84)
- Party: Bangladesh Awami League
- Parent: Khandaker Nurul Islam (father)
- Relatives: Md. Habibe Millat (son-in-law)
- Education: M. Engg.
- Alma mater: BUET; Strathclyde University

Khandaker Mosharraf Hossain (born 25 September 1942) is a Bangladeshi politician. He is the former Jatiya Sangsad member representing the Faridpur-3 constituency. He served as a minister of the Ministry of Labour and Employment, Ministry of Expatriates' Welfare and Overseas Employment, and Ministry of Local Government and Rural Development and Co-operative.

== Early life and education ==
Hossain was born on 25 September 1942 to a Bengali Muslim Khandaker family in Faridpur. His father, Khandaker Nurul Islam, was a member of the first National Parliament of Bangladesh. His father was a cousin of Sheikh Mujibur Rahman, making him a cousin of Sheikh Hasina and member of the Sheikh–Wazed family. Hossain completed his BSc in civil engineering 1963 and MSc in traffic and highway engineering from Bangladesh University of Engineering and Technology (BUET). He also studied at Strathclyde University and earned the degree of Master of Engineering.

== Career ==
Hossain was the first chief engineer of the Rural Workers' Programme in Bangladesh. From 1973 to 1980 he worked as the project director of this program. He joined BUET as a visiting professor in 1980. He worked as the chief technical consultant of ILO in Sierra-Leone during 1980-89 and Uganda during 1989–90. He was the president of Bangladesh Chamber of Industries (BCI) for two terms.

Hossain was elected to parliament from Faridpur-3 as a Awami League candidate. He defeated former member of parliament Chowdhury Kamal Ibne Yusuf who was running as an independent. He was the president of the International Labour Conference from June 2009 to June 2010. He was the president of Colombo Process, a forum of 11 Asian labour sending countries. The 4th Ministerial Consultation of Colombo Process was held in Dhaka from 19 to 21 April 2011 under his chairmanship. Hossain received Journalist Association Award for his contribution to the trade and industrial sector of Bangladesh.

Hossain was elected to parliament in 2014 from Faridpur-3 as an Awami League candidate. He was elected unopposed as the election was boycotted by all major parties.

In August 2015, Swapan Kumar Paul, an Awami League politician from Faridpur District filled an Information and Communication Technology Act case against journalist Probir Sikder, for "tarnishing the image" of Hossain. Sikder was arrested from Faridpur by Bangladesh Police. Sikder was released on bail on 20 August 2015 after Hossain asked the prosecution to not oppose his bail.

In July 2017, Hossain said that water logging in Bangladesh will not happen from next year at the annual conference of deputy commissioners of Bangladesh.

Hossain was re-elected to parliament from Faridpur-3 as an Awami League candidate in 2018.

On 26 November 2023, Awami League announced the final list of its 298 candidates to contest the 2024 national election which did not include Hossain.

== Personal life ==
Hossain has a son, Khandker Mashroor Hossain, who was married to Saima Wazed.

On 7 June 2020, local police raided Hossain's house in Faridpur and arrested two of his associates, Sajjad Hossain Barkat and Imtiaz Hassan Rubel. They were detained with 25.45 billion taka in illicit money.

On 8 March 2022, Hossain's brother, Khandaker Mohtesam Hossain Babar, was arrested for embezzling ৳250,000,000.

Hossain has been residing in Switzerland since April 2022. Citing his health recovery treatments, his absence in the parliamentary meetings was approved for 90 sessions in September 2023.
