= Shahed Ali Patwary =

Pakistani lawyer and politician

- শাহেদ আলী পাটোয়ারী

Deputy Speaker of the East Pakistan Provincial Assembly
- In office 1955 – 26 September 1958
- Preceded by: Nazmul Haq
- Succeeded by: Syed Ziaul Ahsan

Personal details
- Born: 1899 Tipperah District, Bengal Presidency, British India
- Died: 26 September 1958 (aged 58–59) Dacca, East Pakistan, Pakistan
- Citizenship: Pakistan
- Party: AL
- Other political affiliations: KSP (1953–1958); AIML (1943–1947); KPP (1929–1943)

Shahed Ali Patwary (Bengali: শাহেদ আলী পাটোয়ারী; 1899– 26 September 1958) was a Pakistani lawyer and politician, elected to the East Bengal Legislative Assembly in 1954.

== Early life ==
Patwary was born in 1899 in Aswinpur in Tipperah District, Bengal Presidency, British Raj. In 1921, he completed his bachelors in philosophy from Dacca College. He did his Masters in Philosophy from the University of Dacca in 1923. He completed a law degree and joined the Tipperah District Bar in 1925 and 1926 respectively.

== Career ==
Patwary started his political career in 1929 when he joined the Krishak Praja Party then led by Sher-e-Bangla A.K. Fazlul Huq. In 1937, he was elected to the Bengal Legislative Assembly. He joined the revived Krishak Sramik Party in 1953. In 1954, he was elected to the East Bengal Legislative Assembly. In 1955, Patwary was elected as Deputy Speaker of East Bengal Legislative Assembly. He joined the Awami League in 1958.

== Death ==
On 23 September 1958, Patwary announced that an Awami League motion, petition by Dewan Mahbub Ali, declaring the speaker Abdul Hakeem to be of 'unsound mind' had been carried. This led to an intense debate in the East Pakistan Assembly which turned violent. The members fought one another until one of them threw a paperweight which struck deputy speaker Patwary in the head, severely injuring him. He died from his wounds 2 days later.
