= Akhteruzzaman Elias =

Bangladeshi writer (1943–1997)

- আখতারুজ্জামান ইলিয়াস
- Pronunciation: [akʰt̪aɾud͡ʒːaman ili̯as]
- Born: 12 February 1943; Gaibandha, Bengal Province, British India
- Died: 4 January 1997 (aged 53); Dhaka, Bangladesh
- Education: University of Dhaka (B.A., M.A.)
- Occupations: Novelist, short story writer, academic
- Relatives: Khaliquzzaman Elias (brother)
- Writing career
- Notable works: Chilekothar Sepai, Khwabnama
- Notable awards: See full list

Akhteruzzaman Elias (pronounced [akʰt̪aɾud͡ʒːaman ili̯as]; 12 February 1943 – 4 January 1997) was a Bangladeshi novelist and short story writer. He has been regarded as one of the most prominent writers of Bangladesh. During his lifetime, he published two novels (Chilekothar Sepoy and Khwabnama) and several short stories. He died from cancer in 1997. Elias won many awards during his lifetime and posthumously.

== Early life and education ==
Elias was born at the home of his maternal uncle in Gotia village, located in the Gaibandha District. His ancestral home was situated in Chelopara, near Bogra. His father, Badiuzzaman Muhammad Elias, was a member of the East Bengal Provincial Assembly and served as the parliamentary secretary of the Muslim League. His mother was Mariam Elias.

Elias completed his matriculation from Bogura Zilla School in 1958 and his intermediate studies at Dhaka College in 1960. He went on to earn both his Bachelor of Arts (Honours) and Master of Arts degrees from the University of Dhaka.

== Career ==
Elias worked as a lecturer at Jagannath College until 1983. After that, he held several positions, including deputy director at the Directorate of Primary Education, vice-principal of Music College, and professor and head of the Department of Bengali at Dhaka College.

Elias began his literary journey with the short story collection Anya Ghore Anya Swar (The Other Voice in the Other House) in 1976. However, his reputation as a serious fiction writer had already taken shape with the serial publication of Chilekothar Sepoy, which explored the tensions of the pre-liberation period in Dhaka and the psychological turmoil of individuals caught in collective political movements. This work remains one of the most significant political novels in Bangladeshi literature, depicting the atmosphere of mass uprisings and ideological conflict before the country's independence in 1971.

In 1982, Elias published another short story collection, Khoari, which strengthened his status as one of Bangladesh’s most important contemporary writers. His short stories delved into the inner struggles of marginalised and ordinary people, capturing the intersection of personal dreams and social realities with masterful subtlety.

A decade later, Khwabnama, set in the pre-partition Bengal of the 1940s, marked a considerable moment in South Asian fiction. This novel was translated by Arunava Sinha and published in English in 2021 by Penguin Hamish Hamilton. According to the Toronto-based writer Subrata Kumar Das, through a tapestry of myth, dream, and history, Elias portrayed the Tebhaga peasant movement, communal riots, and the human cost of partition. The novel is notable for its deep engagement with "magic realism", blending the fantastic and the real to reflect the fragmented consciousness of a nation on the brink of transformation.

In addition to his novels, Elias authored several short story collections, including Dudh Bhate Utpat (1985) and Dhojokher Om (1989). His final years were marked by illness, but he continued to write until his death. Posthumously, two collections were published in 1997: Jaal Swapno, Swapner Jaal (short stories) and Sanskritir Bhanga Setu (essays).

== Death ==
In 1995, Elias was diagnosed with cancer in his right leg, leading to an amputation in 1996. Despite his illness, he completed Khwabnama, which was published shortly before his death. Akhtaruzzaman Elias died on January 4, 1997, leaving behind a small but profoundly influential body of work.

Elias is remembered as a writer who elevated Bangladeshi fiction to new artistic heights. His depiction of the human psyche within political turbulence continues to inspire writers and scholars across generations.

== Select bibliography ==
=== Novels ===
- Chilekothar Sepai /চিলেকোঠার সেপাই (The Soldier in the Attic) (1987) - details the psychological journey of a man during the turbulent period of the mass uprisings of 1969, just prior to Bangladeshi independence in 1971. This novel also contains what is arguably the most authentic description of life in Puran Dhaka, the old and distinctive part of Dhaka.
- Khwabnama/খোয়াবনামা (The Saga of Dreams) (1996) - Khwabnama depicts the socio-political scene in rural pre-partition Bangladesh.

=== Short story collections ===
- Dojokher Om/ দোজখের ওম (The Warmth of Hell)
- Dudhbhate Utpat/ দুধভাতে উৎপাত (No Peace in Milk and Rice)
- Onno Ghore Onno Shor/ অন্য ঘরে অন্য স্বর (Another Tune in Another Room)
- Khoari/ খোয়ারি (Hangover)
- Jal Shopno, Shopner Jal/ জাল স্বপ্ন, স্বপ্নের জাল (Fake Dream, Illusion of Dream)

=== Essay collections ===
- Shongskritir Bhanga Shetu/ সংস্কৃতির ভাঙা সেতু (Broken Bridge of Culture)

== In popular culture ==
Niruddesh Jatra is a short film directed by Debashis Doob, based on the short story under the same name written by Akhtaruzzaman.

== Awards ==
- 1977: Humayun Kabir Smrti Puraskar
- 1983: Bangla Academy Literary Award in Literature
- 1987: Alaol Sahitya Puraskar - Chilekothar Sepai
- 1996: Ananda Puraskar - Khwabnama
- 1996: Saadat Ali Akhand Puraskar - Khwabnama
- 1996: Kazi Mahbubullah Gold Medal - Khwabnama
- 1999: Ekushey Padak (posthumous)

== See also ==
- Humayun Ahmed
- Syed Shamsul Haque
- Nabarun Bhattacharya
- Arunava Sinha
