= Shah Ali Baghdadi =

16th-century Sufi saint of Bengal

Coordinates: 23.7970°N 90.3489°E

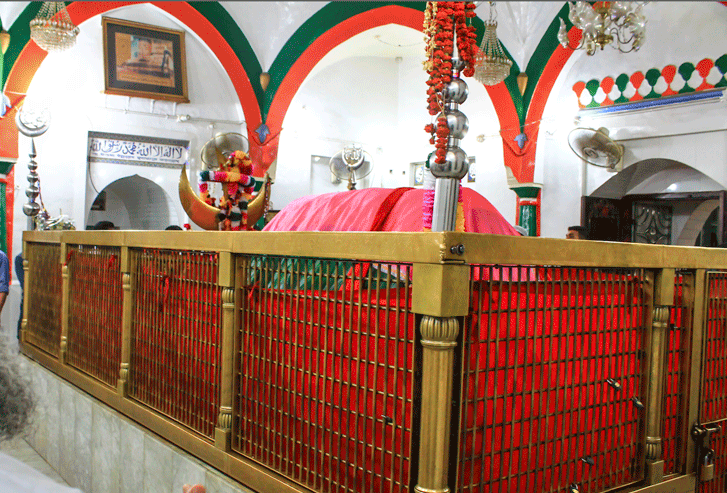
- Mazar of Shah Ali Baghdadi

Personal life
- Born: c. 1414 Baghdad, Abbasid Caliphate
- Died: 1480 (aged 65–66) Mirpur, Dhaka, Bengal Sultanate

Religious life
- Religion: Islam
- Denomination: Sunni
- Tariqa: Kubrawiya

Muslim leader
- Based in: Mirpur, Dhaka
- Post: Sufi saint
- Period in office: 15th century
- Disciple of: Shah Bahar
- Arabic name
- Personal (Ism): ʿAlī علي
- Patronymic (Nasab): ibn Fakhr ad-Dīn بن فخر الدين
- Toponymic (Nisba): al-Baghdādī البغدادي

Shāh ʿAlī al-Baghdādī (c. 1414–1480) was a 15th-century Muslim missionary and Sufi saint based in the Faridpur and Dhaka regions of Bengal.

== Life ==
Ali al-Baghdadi was born in c. 1414 to Mufti Fakhruddin in Baghdad, Abbasid Caliphate. He was a descendant of Sultan Ali, allegedly a son of Muhammad al-Jawad and younger brother of Ali al-Hadi.

At the age of twenty, he travelled to the Delhi Sultanate with forty to one hundred companions in 838 AH (1434 CE). He married into the Sayyid dynasty of Delhi. Eventually, he entered the Sultanate of Bengal during the reign of Sultan Jalaluddin Muhammad Shah. The Sultan gifted him with 12,000 bighas of land in Dholsamudra, Faridpur and he settled in the qasba of Girdah. The presence of Sufi saints such as Shah Ali Baghdadi, his brother-in-law Shah Husayn Tegh-Burhana and companions Haji Saaduddin and Shah Muhammad Goraz led to the area being named as Miran-i-Girdah in their honour. Many Hindus in Girdah converted to Islam through his efforts.

In due course, Ali proceeded to Dhaka. This later migration is explained by the engulfment of Girdah as a result of Padma River erosion and Ali's desire to become initiated into the Chishti Order by Shah Bahar, a Sufi saint based in Dhaka. Nevertheless, Ali also contributed to spreading Islam in Dhaka, where he remained until the rest of his life.

== Shrine ==
After practicing chilla in complete fasting for forty days, Shah Ali Baghdadi died in c. 1480 and was buried in Mirpur, Dhaka. However, according to a book preserved in his mausoleum, he died in 1577 AD. The Bangladeshi Islamic scholar Nur Muhammad Azmi identifies Shah Ali's year of death as 913 AH (1507 AD). Many pilgrims visit his shrine at the time of his urs (death anniversary) from different parts of Bengal and beyond. His mosque was completely renovated in 1806.

The second Nawab of Dhaka Khwaja Abdul Ghani constructed a road leading to the shrine in the 18th century. His son and successor, Khwaja Ahsanullah, contributed towards the renovation of the shrine and establishment of a musafir-khana (guest-house).

== Legacy ==
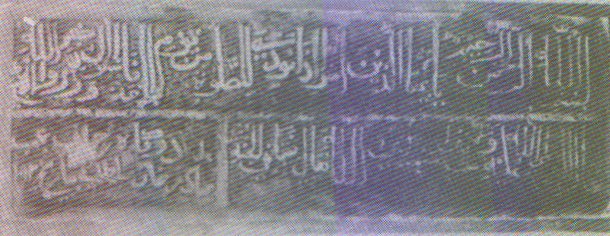
Ancient inscription from the Girdah Dargah Mosque

The Shah Ali Thana was founded in 2005, and includes the ward of Shah Ali Nagar.

A mosque in Girdah Locally called Gayabi Mosque contains an ancient relic chamber set up by Shah Ali Baghdadi. These include his wooden plate, turban, prayer mat and tasbih (made out of fish bone). The chamber also holds a kurdi coat which was said to have belonged to Shah Madar, as well as Relics of Muhammad, Ali, Hasan, Husayn and Abdul Qadir Gilani.

His nephew, Shah Syed Habibullah Maddan-e-Khoda (son of Shah Husayn Tegh-Burhana), settled in the village of Banamalidia, Madhukhali, Faridpur (where he is buried). Among his notable descendants are Barrister Syed Qumrul Islam Mohammad Salehuddin who was elected MNA from Faridpur 2 in 1970, MCA in 1972 elected MP of Bangladesh Parliament in 1973 from Faridpur 3 & Founder of Bangladesh Justice Party. Baghdadi's son Syed Shah Usman settled in Dasar, Madaripur in 1504, on tiger-back. From his descendants is businessman and politician Syed Abul Hossain.
