= Abdul Hakeem (speaker) =

Bengali politician, speaker of the East Bengal Legislative Assembly

- আব্দুল হাকিম

Speaker of the East Pakistan Provincial Assembly
- In office 1955 – 27 September 1958
- Preceded by: Abdul Karim
- Succeeded by: Shahed Ali Patwary

Personal details
- Born: 17 August 1901 Jessore District, Bengal Presidency, British India
- Died: 13 January 1968 (aged 66) Khulna, East Pakistan, Pakistan
- Citizenship: Pakistan

Abdul Hakeem (17 August 1901 – 13 January 1968) was a Bengali politician and speaker of the East Bengal Legislative Assembly.

== Early life ==
Hakeem was born on 17 August 1901 in Tona, Jessore District, Bengal Presidency, British India. He graduated from Kalia Public High School in Khulna. He did his undergraduate and graduate studies in English Language from the University of Calcutta, after which he completed a law degree from the University of Calcutta.

== Career ==
Hakeem worked with A. K. Fazlul Huq, Ashutosh Mukherjee, Huseyn Shaheed Suhrawardy, and Subhas Chandra Bose in Kolkata and became involved in politics. In 1937, he was elected to Bengal Legislative Assembly from Khulna. In 1947, he moved to East Bengal following the Partition of India. He was elected to the Khulna Bar Association. He founded Pallimangal High School and City Law College, Khulna. In 1954, he was elected to the East Bengal Provincial Assembly from the United Front and made the speaker of the assembly.

On 23 September 1958, Shahed Ali Patwary announced that an Awami League motion, petition by Dewan Mahbub Ali, declaring the speaker Abdul Hakeem to be of 'unsound mind' had been carried. This resulted chaos in the East Pakistan Assembly and physical fights between legislators. One of them hurled a paper weight which hit Shahid Ali in his head. He was injured and died four days later.

== Death ==
Hakeem died on 13 January 1968 in Khulna.
