= Sirajul Islam Mridha =

Bangladeshi politician

- সিরাজুল ইসলাম মৃধা

Member of Bangladesh Parliament
- In office 1979–1986
- Preceded by: Syed Qumrul Islam Saleh Uddin
- Succeeded by: Mohabbat Jan Chowdhury

Personal details
- Party: Bangladesh Nationalist Party

Sirajul Islam Mridha is a Bangladesh Nationalist Party politician who was a member of parliament for Faridpur-3 from 1979 to 1986.
