= Mohabbat Jan Chowdhury =

Bangladeshi politician (1933/1934–2026)

- মোহাব্বত জান চৌধুরী

Member of Parliament for Faridpur-3
- In office 1986–1988
- Preceded by: Sirajul Islam Mridha
- Succeeded by: Kamran Hossain Chowdhury

Personal details
- Born: 1933 or 1934
- Died: 24 August 2026 (aged 92) Dhaka, Bangladesh
- Party: Bangladesh Krishak Sramik Awami League
- Education: Pakistan Military Academy

Military service
- Allegiance: Bangladesh; Pakistan (Before 1972)
- Branch/service: Pakistan Army; Bangladesh Army; Bangladesh Rifles
- Years of service: 1955–1982
- Rank: Major General
- Unit: Corps of Signals
- Commands: Director General of Directorate General of Forces Intelligence; Commandant of Signals Training Centre and School; Director of Signals Directorate, Army Headquarters; Deputy Director General of Bangladesh Rifles

Mohabbat Jan Chowdhury (Bengali: মোহাব্বত জান চৌধুরী; 1933 or 1934 – 24 August 2026) was a Bangladeshi Army major general, politician and home minister. He served as the director general of DGFI.

== Background ==
Mohabbat Jan Chowdhury was born into a Bengali Muslim family who were erstwhile Zamindars of Khanpur in Gopalganj. His father, Said Jan Chowdhury (died 1984), was a civil servant and the son of Zamindar Rahmat Jan Chowdhury of Khanpur. His great-grandfather, Ahmad Jan Chowdhury, was one of the two sons of Azim Chowdhury, the Zamindar of Dulai in Sujanagar, Pabna District. Through him, he was a descendant of Sharfuddin Sarkar, a nobleman who migrated to Dulai from Samarkand in Turkestan. Mohabbat's mother belonged to the aristocratic zamindar family of Ulania, who traced their ancestry to Persia.

== Career ==
Chowdhury trained at the Pakistan Military Academy and joined the Pakistan Army in September 1955 as a second lieutenant. He was a coursemate of Ziaur Rahman. He served in a number of positions, including in staff headquarters, military training schools, and Inter-Services Intelligence. During the Bangladesh Liberation War, he was based in Pakistan and was repatriated to Bangladesh after the end of the war.

After the independence of Bangladesh, he joined the Bangladesh Army. He was deputed to the Bangladesh Rifles, where he served as the deputy director general. He was the director of the Army Signal Corps and then the director general of the Directorate General of Forces Intelligence in 1977. He said the results of the referendum of President Ziaur Rahman, in which he won 98.88 percent of the votes, were inflated by the administration, which he described as unnecessary. He was the director general in 1981 during the assassination of President Ziaur Rahman. After the assassination, Chowdhury and National Security Intelligence (NSI) Director General ASM Hakim played a double game, both supporting senior minister Shah Aziz, but also helping Hossain Mohammad Ershad's efforts to seize power. He kept Major General Moinul Hossain Chowdhury, head of the investigation into the assassination, under surveillance.

He served as the chairman of the Bangladesh Krishi Bank and the Public Administration Training Centre.

Chowdhury, after retirement, joined politics. He was elected to parliament from Faridpur-3 from the Bangladesh Krishak Sramik Awami League in 1986. He was the minister for home affairs, minister of relief and rehabilitation, minister of establishment, and minister of food in the cabinet of President Hussain Mohammad Ershad. He was the chairman of two businesses, Dynamic Communications and Taurus Knitwear. He was the director of Micro Industries Development Assistance and Services (MIDAS).

== Death ==
Chowdhury died at the Combined Military Hospital in Dhaka, on 24 August 2026, at the age of 92.
