= Channel 24 (Bangladeshi TV channel) =

Bangladeshi News channel

- Country: Bangladesh
- Broadcast area: Nationwide
- Headquarters: Tejgaon, Dhaka

Programming
- Language: Bengali
- Picture format: 1080i HDTV (downscaled to 16:9 576i for SDTV sets)

Ownership
- Owner: Times Media Limited

History
- Launched: 24 May 2012; 14 years ago

Links
- Website: www.channel24bd.tv

Channel 24 (Bengali: চ্যানেল টুয়েন্টিফোর) is a Bangladeshi Bengali-language satellite and cable television channel airing programming relating to news and current affairs, owned by Times Media Limited, a subsidiary of the Ha-meem Group. The channel was launched on 24 May 2012 initially as a mixed entertainment channel, before moving to solely airing news programming.

== History ==
Channel 24 was granted a license to broadcast in February 2010 by the Bangladesh Telecommunication Regulatory Commission. It began test transmissions on 22 August 2011. Although initially planning to do so in December of that year, it officially commenced transmissions on 24 May 2012 at 19:00 (BST). Originally, its programming line was diversified, consisting of drama, news, television films, music, sports, talk shows, and many more. It also offered programming targeted towards viewers in Chittagong, which is broadcast from the city. It later changed its focus to mostly airing news and current affairs programming. Within two years of its launch, Channel 24 became the top news channel in Bangladesh.

Channel 24 was one of the nine Bangladeshi television channels to sign an agreement with Bdnews24.com to subscribe to a video-based news agency run by children called Prism in May 2016. The channel was the first in Bangladesh to introduce an AI news anchor, named 'Aparajita', who debuted on 19 July 2023. During the non-cooperation movement on 5 August 2024, Channel 24 broadcast live footages of protesters storming the Ganabhaban, the official residence of the former prime minister Sheikh Hasina, as they celebrate her resignation.

== Controversies ==
On 18 September 2013, on Channel 24's talk show Muktobaak, two participants stated that the rights of Salahuddin Quader Chowdhury were curtailed as he was not allowed to place defense witnesses, raising doubts about the trial process by the International Crimes Tribunal. This statement was found to be "baseless" and "utterly false" and resulted in a contempt petition against the officials of the channel.

== Programming ==
- Amar Joto Gaan
- Beyond the Gallery
- Entertainment 24
- Lifestyle 24
- Mukhomukhi
- Prosongo Rajniti
- Sports 24
