= Gopesh Chandra Pal =

Bengali politician

Member of the East Bengal Legislative Assembly
- Constituency: Sylhet Sadar (North)

Member of the Assam Legislative Assembly

Gopesh Chandra Pal was elected to the List of members of the 1st Provincial Assembly of East Bengal from Sylhet Sadar (North). He had served in the Assam Legislative Assembly till 1946. He had advocated for keeping Sylhet in India had campaigned against the partition of Sylhet during the 1947 Sylhet Referendum.
