= Bijoy Krishna Sarkar =

Bijoy Krishna Sarkar was elected to the List of members of the 1st Provincial Assembly of East Bengal from Jessore.
