= Ha-meem Group =

Bangladeshi textile and garments company

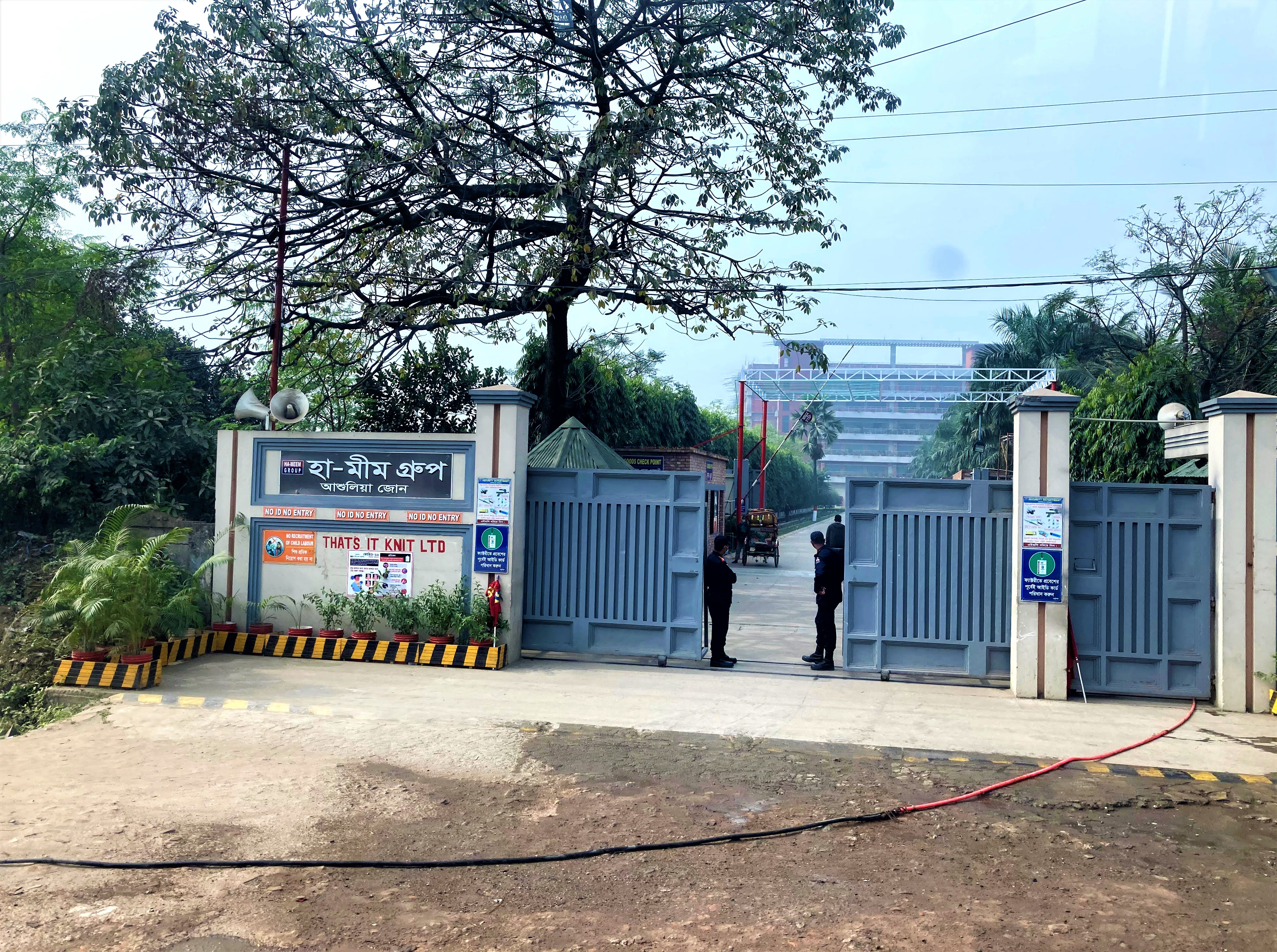
- Type: Private
- Industry: Composite textile, tea, leather, transport, media
- Headquarters: Dhaka, Bangladesh
- Key people: Abdul Kader Azad (Chairman, CEO & Managing Director)
- Revenue: ▲US$550 million
- Number of employees: 75,000
- Website: www.hameemgroup.net

Ha-Meem Group is a Bangladeshi conglomerate in textile and garments sector. It owns 26 garments factories, sweater factory, poly bag industry, label factory, jute mill, chemical formulation plant, tea estates, transport company, Channel 24 and Samakal, a widely circulated national daily newspaper. The newspaper are under Times Media Limited of Ha-Meem Group. It employs 50,000 people.

In the 2025–26 financial year, Ha-Meem Group entered Bangladesh's billion-dollar club for the first time, recording approximately US$1.05 billion in combined import and export trade. According to data from the National Board of Revenue (NBR), reported by Prothom Alo, the group's exports amounted to US$751.6 million, while imports totaled US$298 million.

A. K. Azad is the chairman, Chief Executive Officer, and managing director of the group. Colonel (retired) Md. Delwar Hossain is the deputy managing director of the group.

== History ==
Establishment and early development

Ha-Meem Group was established in 1984 by A. K. Azad. The business started with a single garment factory in Motijheel, Dhaka, equipped with 57 machines.

Garment workers vandalized their factory in Ashulia after which the group filed a case against 1600 unidentified people in 2009. The group denied the workers were from their own factory. The protests started after 1000 garment workers in an unrelated factory were fired. The group chairman, A. K. Azad, filed police case requesting security from Bashundhara Group after Samakal wrote news articles against the Bashundhara Group.

On 14 December 2010, 26 workers died in a fire at Thats it Sportswear, a Ha-Meem Group factory, in Ashulia and 100 were injured. The fire exit and gate of the factory were locked which increased the death toll.

In June 2012, labour unrest broke out at the subsidiary of the group, Artistic Design Limited, in Ashulia.

Labour unrests in the group's factories in Ashulia stopped production as workers went on strike demanding increase in salary in May 2013. About 80 per cent of the group's export went to the United States.

In December 2016, the group terminated 368 workers over labour unrest.

Ha-Meem Group invested 60 million USD to expand Denim production in 2017. Bangladesh Bank rejected a proposal by Ha-meem group to invest 10 million USD in Haiti to export to the United States. That's It Fashions Limited announced plans to buy 11 million shares of Pubali Bank. Ha-Meem Group invested in tea plantations.

On 21 March 2018, the house of the group's chairman, A. K. Azad, was demolished in Gulshan by the Rajdhani Unnayan Kartripakkha, led by director Aliur Rahman, for not having an approved design. Ha-Meem group claimed the demolition took place despite them showing legal documents and stopped after it was shown to the chairman of Rajdhani Unnayan Kartripakkha. Anti Corruption Commission summoned Azad on the same day as the demolition. Azad is the senior Vice-President of Faridpur District unit of Awami League and director of Shahjalal Islami Bank.

In April 2020, workers of Sharmin Group and Ha-meem Group participated in violent labour protests.

A worker of the group was seriously injured in police firing at a workers protest. The workers of That's It Garments Limited and Creative Collections Limited were protesting when the police shot them on 10 May 2021.

It sold $200 million worth of garment products in the Bangladeshi market. Refat Garments Limited is the biggest exporting unit of the group with exports worth 172 million USD in 2017-2018 fiscal year.

== Subsidiaries ==
- Artistic Design Limited
- Ha-Meem Apparels Limited
- That’s It Garments Limited
- That’s It Sports Wear Limited
- Apparels Gallery Limited
- Refat Garments Limited
- Creative Collections Limited
- Next Collections Limited
- Ha-Meem Design Limited
- Refat Packaging & Printing Industries Limited
- That’s It Knit Limited
- That's It Sweater Limited
- Modern Washing Plant
- Sajid Washing Plant
- Creative Washing Plant
- Express Washing Plant56655
- Ha-Meem Denim Mills Limited
- Ha-Meem label
- Ha-Meem Design Studio
- Embroidery Factory
- Printing Factory
- Carton Factory
- Poly Bag Industry
- Label Factory
- M. H. Jute Mills Limited
- Chemical Formulation Plant

== Times Media Limited ==
- Channel 24
- Samakal

== See also ==
- List of companies of Bangladesh
