= Badiuzzaman Muhammad Elias =

Bengali politician

Member of the East Bengal Provincial Assembly
- In office 1947–1953

Personal details
- Party: Muslim League

Badiuzzaman Muhammad Elias was a Bengali politician from Bogra. He was a member of the East Bengal Provincial Assembly from 1947 to 1953 and a member of the Muslim League, of which he was Parliamentary Secretary.

== Career ==
Elias was a member of the East Bengal Provincial Assembly during 1947–1953. He was affiliated with the Muslim League and served as its Parliamentary Secretary.

== Personal life ==
Elias's paternal home was in Chelopara, near Bogra. His son, Akhteruzzaman Elias, was one of the foremost fiction writers of Bangladesh, known for the novels Chilekothar Sepai (1987) and Khoyabnama (1996). His other son, Khaliquzzaman Elias, is translator who received the Bangla Academy Literary Award in 2011. His grandson, Andalib Elias, is an ambassador of Bangladesh.
