= Muazzem Hussein Chowdhury =

Indian politician

- মুয়াজ্জেম হুসেন চৌধুরী
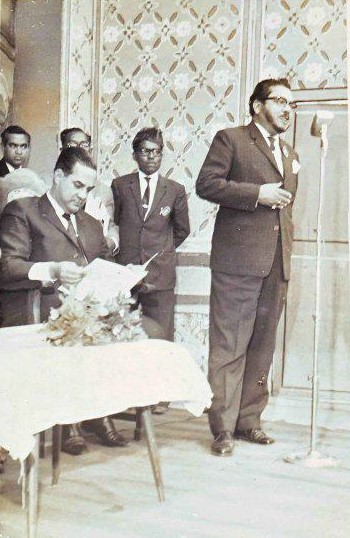
- Born: 1903; Faridpur, Bengal Presidency, British India
- Died: 1967 (aged 63–64); Cox's Bazar, East Pakistan, Pakistan
- Spouse: Begum Sayeeda Khatun
- Father: Chowdhury Moyezuddin Biwshash
- Relatives: Yusuf Ali Chowdhury (brother)

Al-Hajj Abd-Allah Zaheeruddin Moazzem Hossein Chowdhury (1903–1967), popular known as Lalmia, was a Bengali Muslim politician. He represented Faridpur District in the Bengal Legislative Council, the Constituent Assembly of Pakistan, and National Assembly of Pakistan. He was Pakistan's federal Minister of Health, Social Welfare and Labour in the cabinet of Ayub Khan.

== Early life ==
Lalmia was born in 1903 at the Moyez Manzil, which was part of the Amirabad Estate, Faridpur. He was the eldest son of Chowdhury Moyezuddin Biwshash. Moyezuddin was a wealthy Bengali Muslim merchant and zamindar who was engaged in the Indian freedom struggle. The Bengal Provincial Conference of the Congress Party was held at the Moez Manzil. Subhash Chandra Bose and Rabindranath Tagore both knew the young Lalmia. Moyezuddin's lawyer Ambica Charan Mazumdar became President of the Indian National Congress during the 31st session of the All India Congress Committee which orchestrated the Lucknow Pact between the Congress and the All India Muslim League. Lalmia enrolled at Aligarh Muslim University in 1918. He married Begum Sayeeda Khatun Chowdhurani, a descendant of Tipu Sultan.

== Political career ==
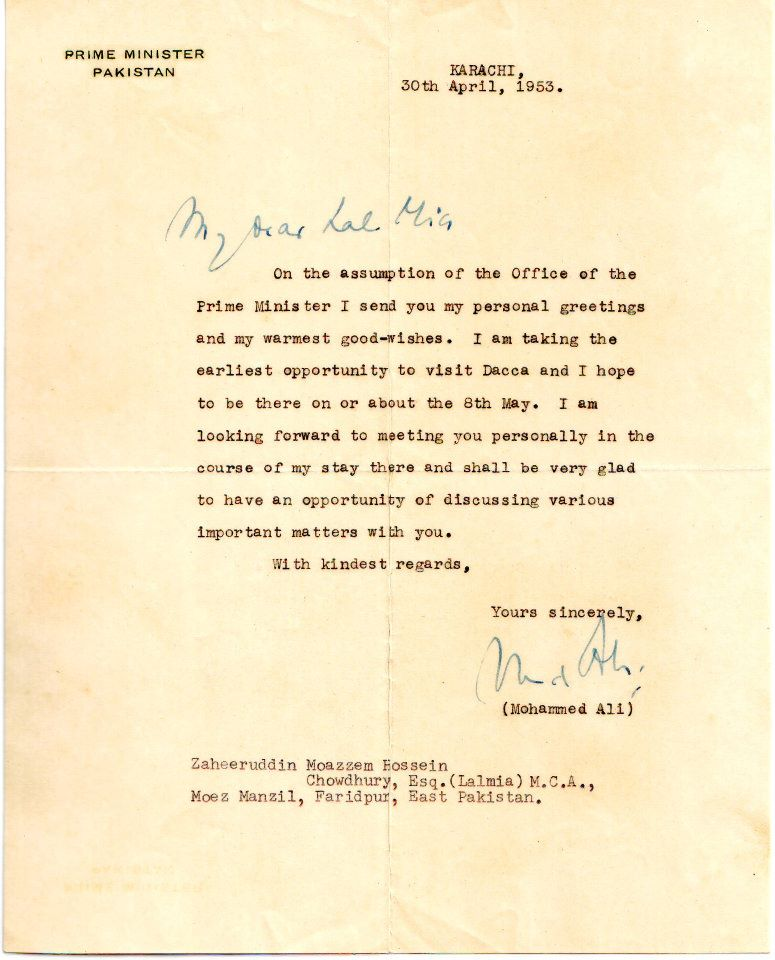
Letter from Prime Minister of Pakistan Mohammad Ali Bogra to Lalmia on 30 April 1953

=== British Bengal ===
While at university, Lalmia got involved in the activities of the Congress Party. He took an active part in the Khilafat Movement between 1919 and 1922 in support of the Ottoman caliphate. He was arrested by the British colonial government.

Lalmia was elected to the Bengal Legislative Council in 1932. He was a member of the council until the partition of India. The breakdown of Hindu-Muslim unity caused Lalmia's younger brother to become a leader of the Muslim League. In 1937, his younger brother was elected to the Bengal Legislative Assembly as a Muslim League candidate. Lalmia joined the Muslim League in 1943. He attended rallies in Calcutta with Muhammad Ali Jinnah and Huseyn Shaheed Suhrawardy. He played a key role in the Indian provincial elections, 1946 in which the Muslim League achieved a strong performance in Bengal, that ultimately led to the creation of Pakistan in 1947.

=== Pakistan ===
Lalmia was a member of the East Bengal Legislative Assembly and the Constituent Assembly of Pakistan. He was the Central Minister of Health, Labour and Social Welfare of Pakistan in 1965. Lalmia was member of the 3rd National Assembly of Pakistan representing Faridpur-1. He was also a member of the 4th National Assembly of Pakistan.

== Family ==
Lalmia's younger brother Yusuf Ali Chowdhury (Mohan Mia) was the first General Secretary of the East Bengal Muslim League after the partition of India in 1947. Mohan was known as the "kingmaker" of Bengali and Pakistani politics because of his coalition forming skills. Lalmia's nephews Chowdhury Kamal Ibne Yusuf and Chowdhury Akmal Ibne Yusuf became leaders of the Bangladesh Nationalist Party (BNP).
