= Abdul Karim (Bengal Legislative Assembly member) =

East Pakistani politician

- আব্দুল করিম

Speaker of the East Pakistan Provincial Assembly
- In office 1948–1954
- Preceded by: Munawwar Ali
- Succeeded by: Abdul Hakeem

Personal details
- Born: Mymensingh District, Bengal Presidency, British India
- Citizenship: Pakistan
- Party: PML

Abdul Karim was a politician, originally from Mymensingh District, Bengal Presidency, British India (present-day Dewanganj Upazila, Jamalpur District, Bangladesh) and was the brother of Abdur Rahim, first elected mayor of Jamalpur. Karim was member of the Bengal Legislative Assembly. In 1947, he was appointed Deputy Speaker and in 1948, he was elected as the Speaker of the East Bengal Legislative Assembly.
