= Chowdhury Shamsuddin Ahmed =

Bangladeshi politician

Chowdhury Shamsuddin Ahmed, also known as Badsha Mia, was a landed aristocrat of Faridpur District. He contested the Bengal Legislative Assembly election in 1937 from Faridpur East but lost to Yusuf Ali Chowdhury, also known as Mohan Mia.

Ahmed was regarded as a prominent political and social figure of Faridpur. He was the owner of extensive estates covering thousands of bighas of land, and was widely respected as an influential leader in the district.

In 1959, Ahmed served as chairman of the Faridpur District Board. He was later elected to the Pakistan National Assembly from Faridpur, defeating Yusuf Ali Chowdhury as a candidate of the Muslim League in 1962.
