= Abdus Salam Khan =

Bangladeshi politician

Member of East Pakistan Provincial Assembly

Personal details
- Born: 1906; Faridpur, Bengal Presidency, British India
- Died: 29 February 1972 (aged 65–66)
- Political party: Bangladesh Awami League

Abdus Salam Khan (1906 – 29 February 1972) was a Bangladesh Awami League politician and a member of East Pakistan Provincial Assembly.

== Early life ==
Khan was born in 1906 in Faridpur, Bengal Presidency, British India. He completed his undergraduate in English in 1929 from Calcutta Presidency College. He completed his graduate studies in political science and law from the University of Dhaka, finishing in 1931.

== Career ==
Khan started his professional career as a lawyer. He started his political career with the Muslim League and taking active part in the Pakistan Movement. He resigned from the Muslim league over differences. In 1949, he joined the Awami Muslim League and was elected to the executive committee of the league. From 1953 to 1955 he was the vice-president of Awami Muslim League. In 1954, he was elected to the East Bengal Provincial Assembly from the United Front. Khan often found himself at loggerheads with his Awami Muslim League Ataur Rahman Khan.

Khan was made the provincial minister of Public Works and Communication in 1955. During his tenure the foundation stone of Central Shaheed Minar was placed. He was opposed to the renaming of Awami Muslim League to Awami League. He formed his own party, which retained the name Awami Muslim League. He was the president of the new Awami Muslim League from 1955 to 1958. He resigned from the cabinet on 11 July 1956. In 1960 he was prohibited from participating in elections in Pakistan under the Elective Bodies Disqualification Order in 1960.

In 1964, Khan was made a member of the Central Executive Committee member of Awami League after the party was revived in the 1960s. On 19 March 1966 he inaugurated the Awami League council meeting in Eden Hotel, Dhaka. The meeting adapted the Six Point Program of Sheikh Mujibur Rahman. In 1966 he was elected president of Dhaka High Court Bar association. In 1967, he participated in the Pakistan Democratic movement. He was the chief defence lawyer of the Agartala Conspiracy Case in 1968. He was involved in the 1969 uprising in East Pakistan. In 1969, he joined the Pakistan Democratic Party of Nurul Amin. He became the president of the party's provincial unit.

== Death ==
Khan died on 29 February 1972.
