= Chowdhury Moyezuddin Biwshash =

- চৌধুরী ময়েজউদ্দিন বিশ্বাস
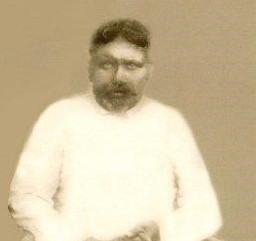
- Moyezuddin in Biswas Bari (c. 1899)
- Born: 1840
- Died: 1923 (aged 82–83)
- Children: Chowdhury Abdallah Zaheeruddin; Yusuf Ali Chowdhury

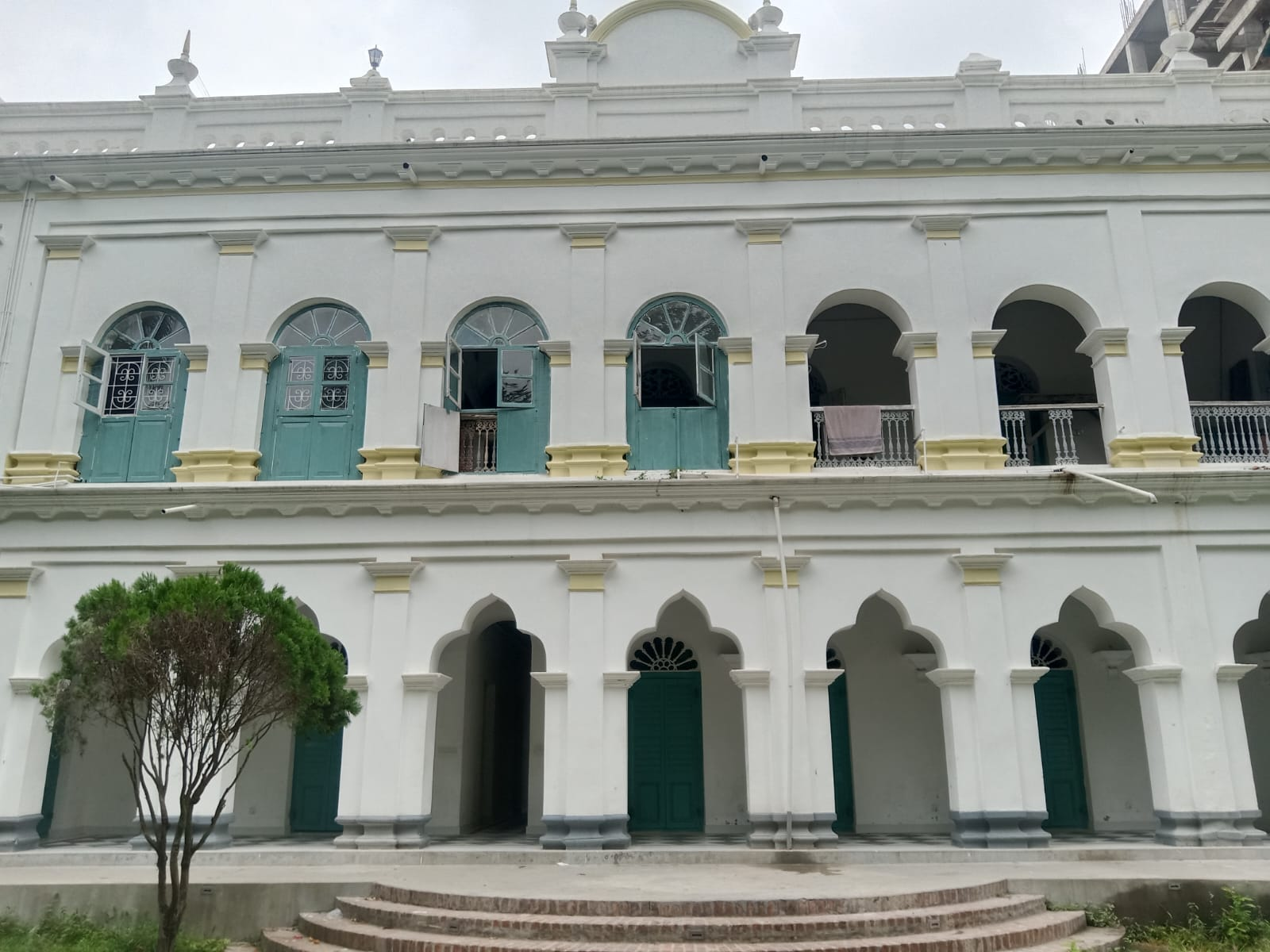
Moyez Manzil

Chowdhury Moyezuddin Biwshash (1840–1923) was a Bengali Muslim merchant and aristocrat from Faridpur in the then British India. Belonging to a zamindar clan of the area, he built a personal fortune of landholdings in Bengal, the Punjab and Arabia.

== Career ==
Moyezuddin supported the Indian National Congress.

== Personal life ==
Moyezuddin's sons and grandchildren engaged in Bengali Muslim politics in the era of the Raj and Pakistan, and in independent Bangladesh. Chowdhury Abdallah Zaheeruddin (eldest son) served as a federal minister of the Pakistani government, while Enayet Hossain Chowdhury (another son) was a member of Pakistan's National Assembly in the 1960s. His second son, Yusuf Ali Chowdhury (commonly known as Mohan Mia), was a figure in the Muslim League and an influential kingmaker in East Pakistani politics; he also sided with the Pakistan Army during the Bangladesh Liberation War in 1971.
