= Faridpur, Bangladesh =

City in Faridpur District, Padma Division, Bangladesh

Faridpur ফরিদপুর
- City
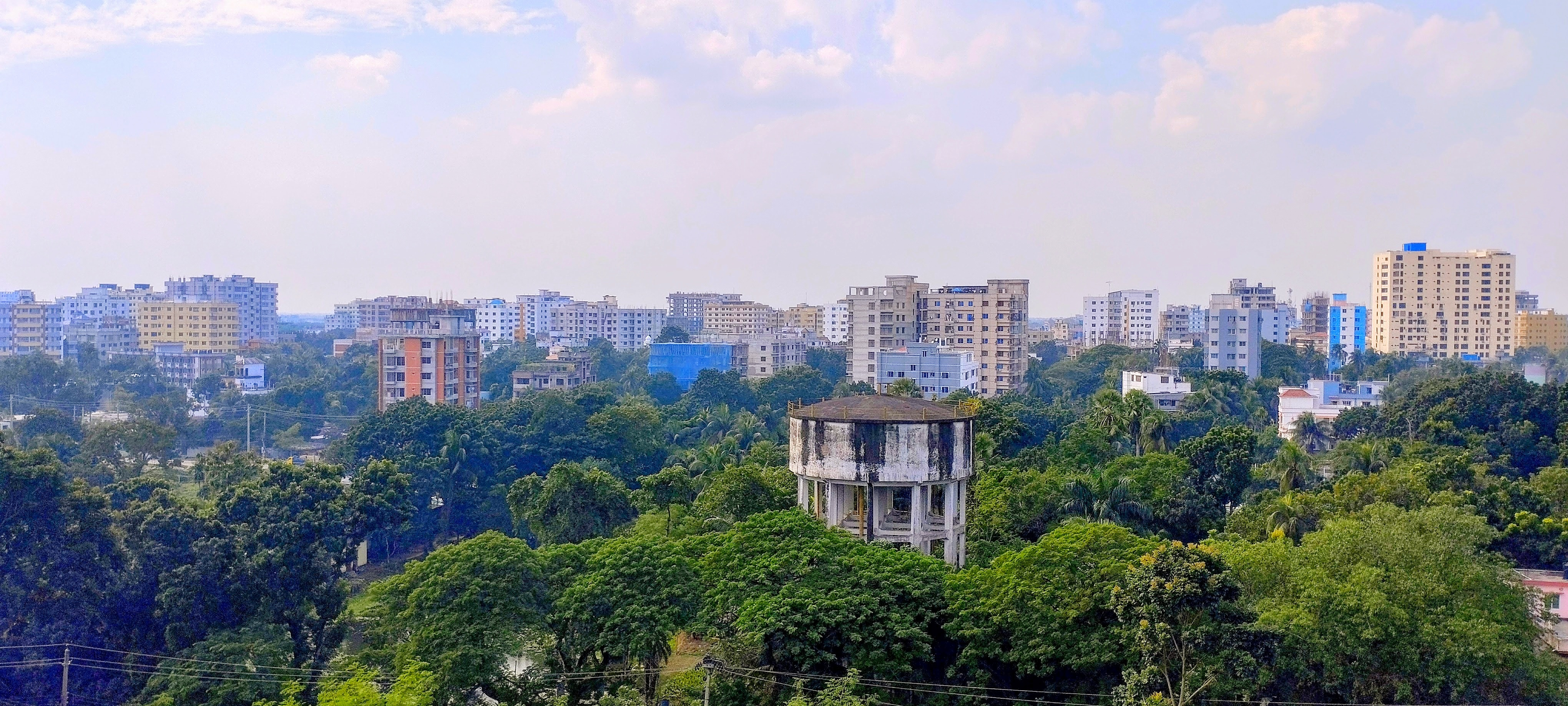
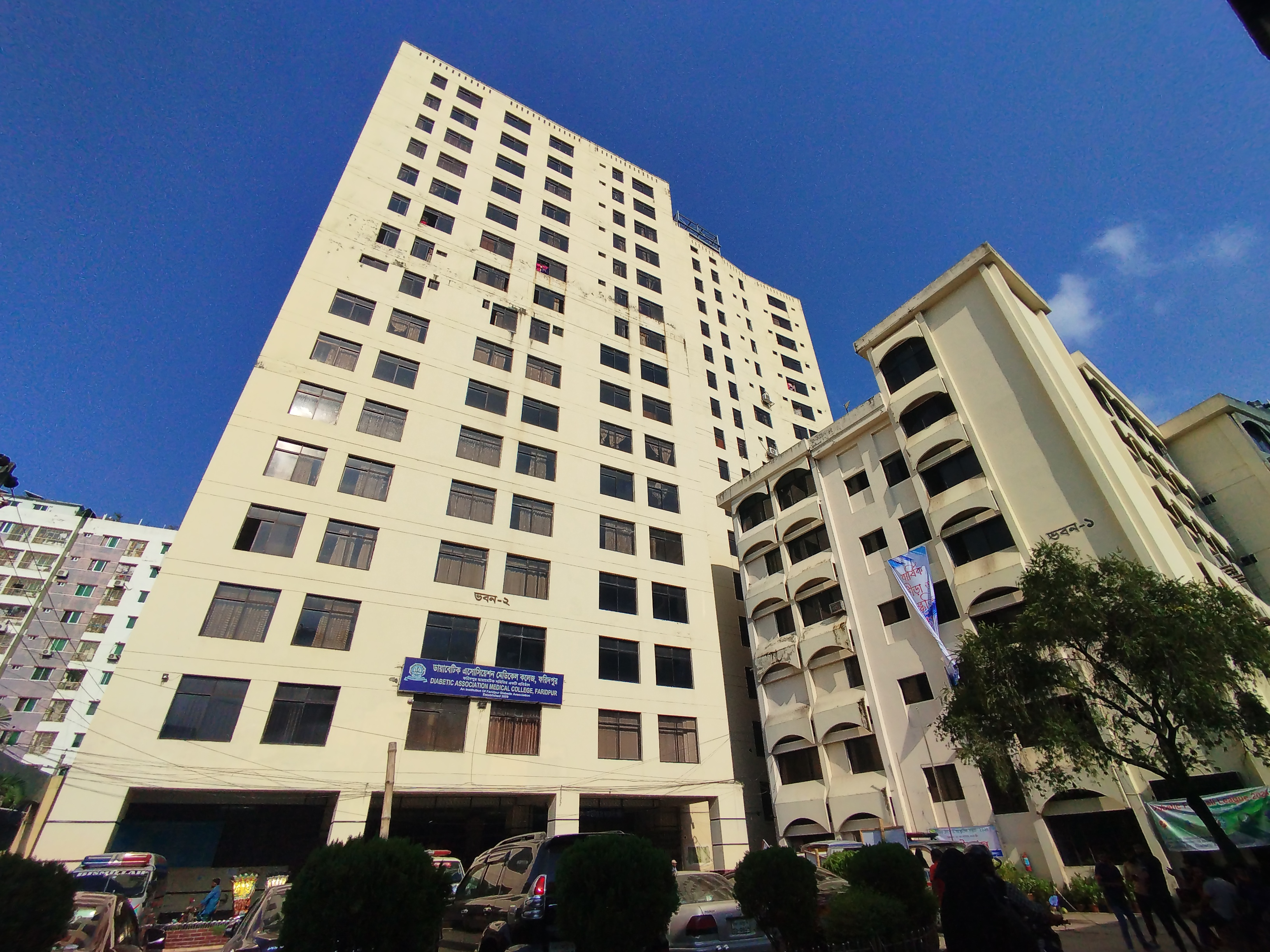
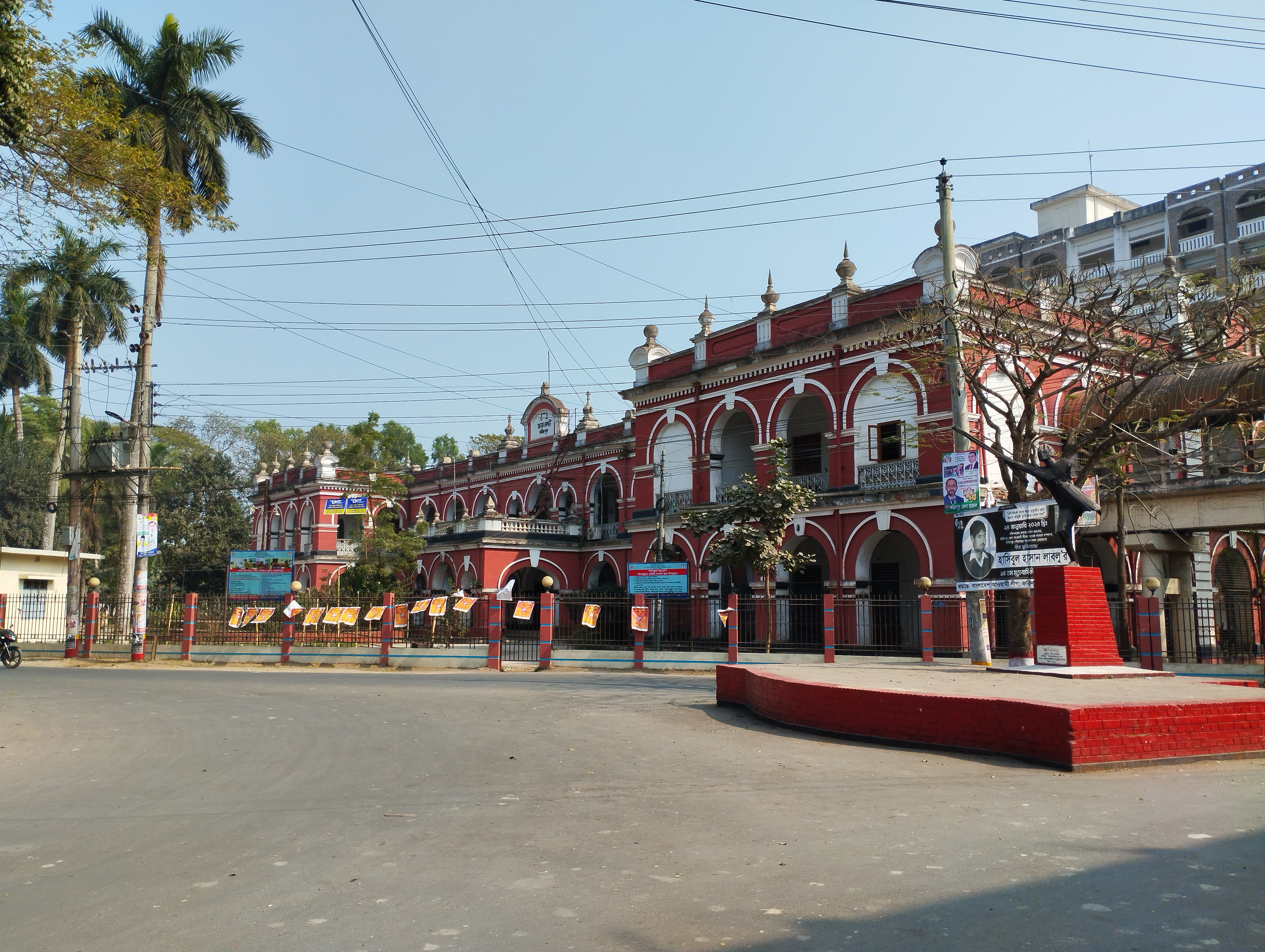
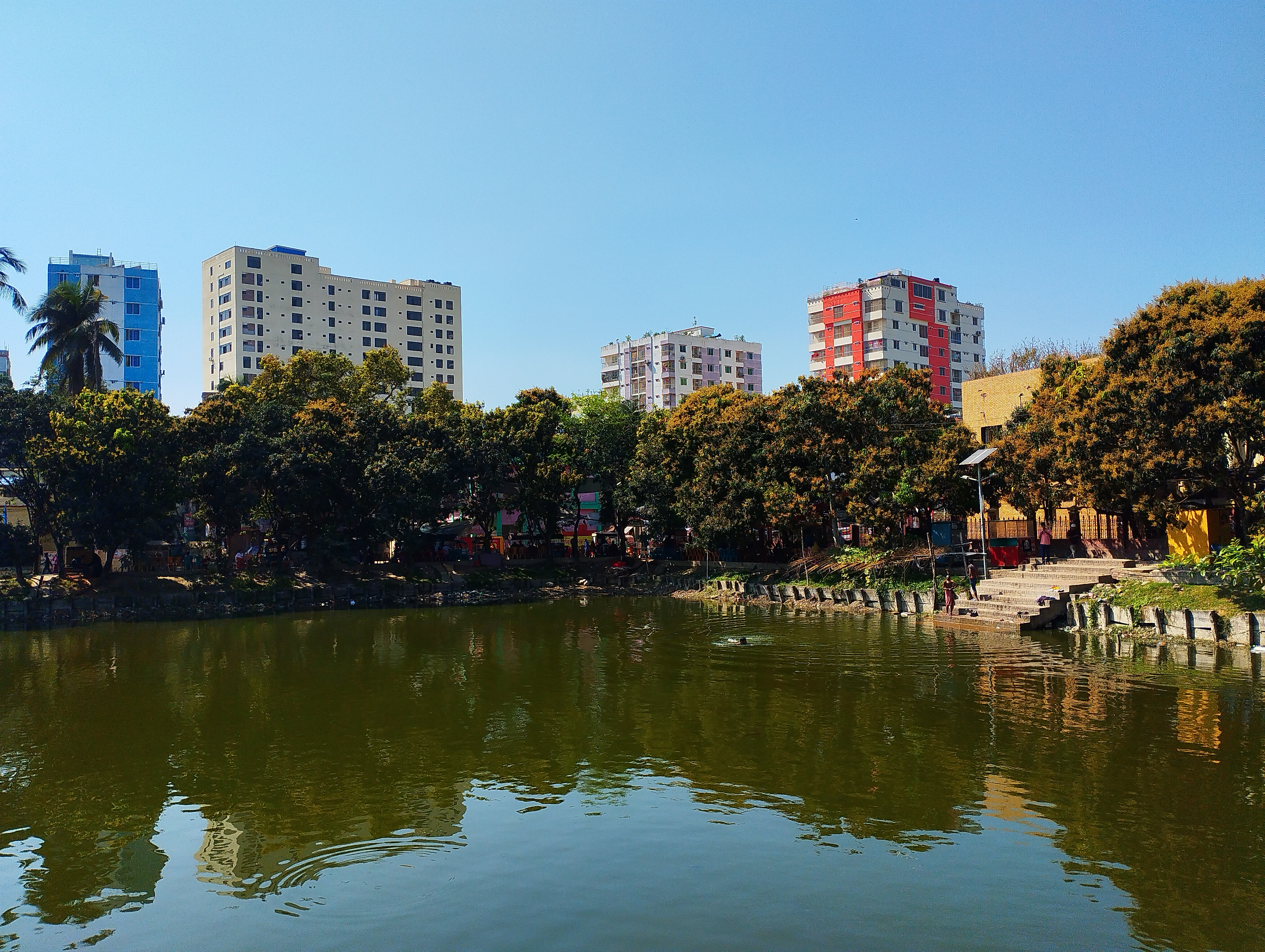
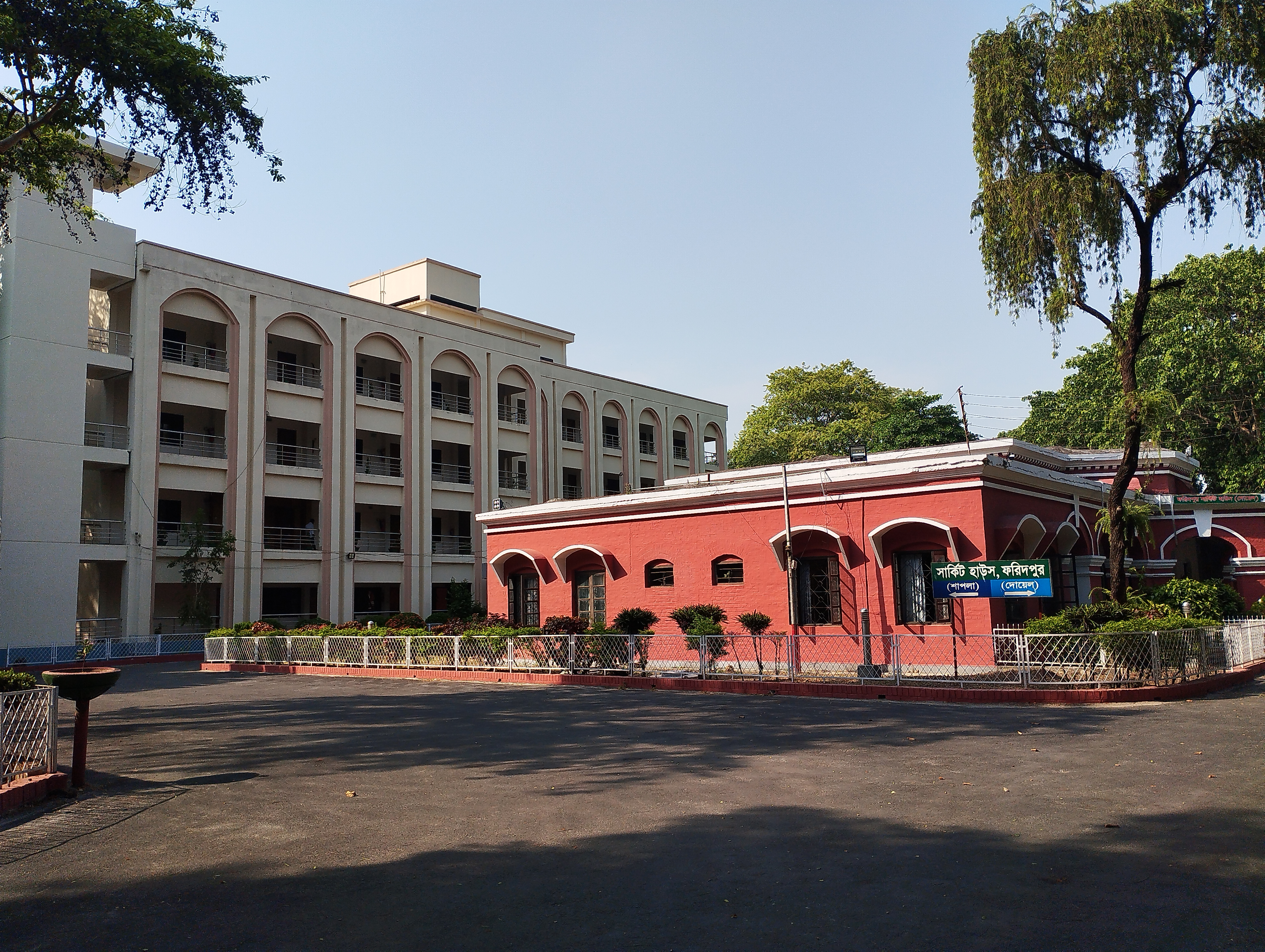
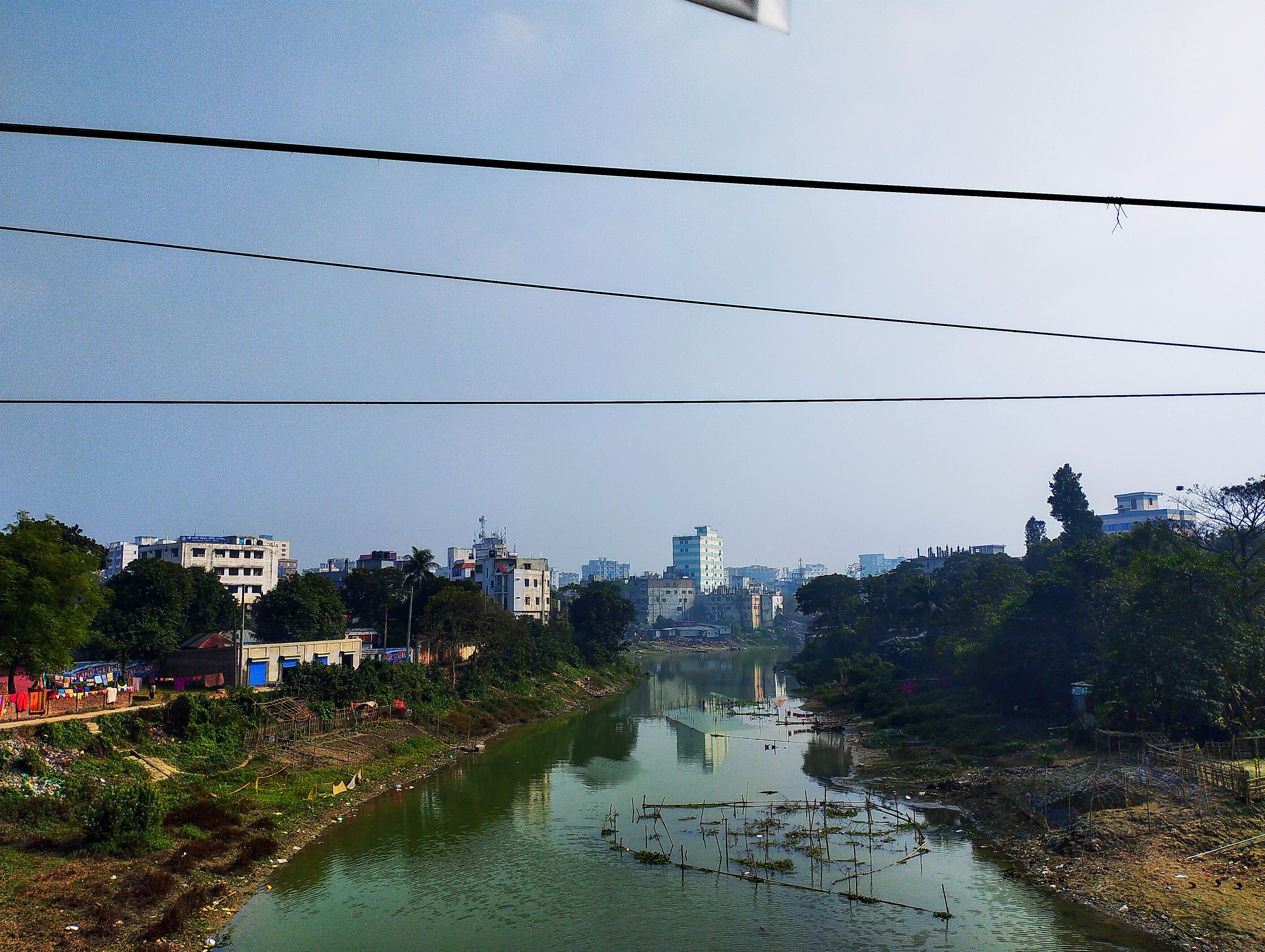
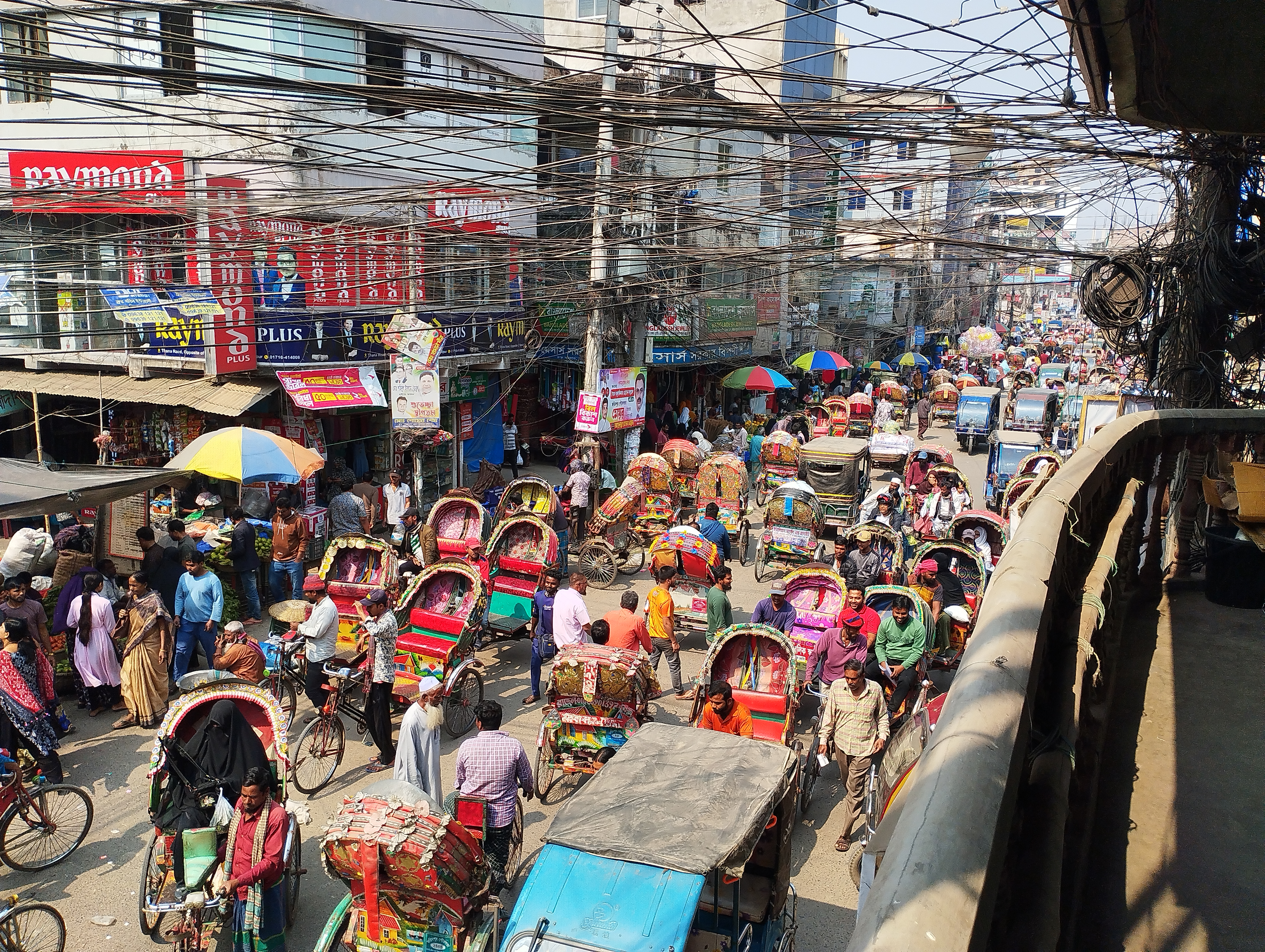
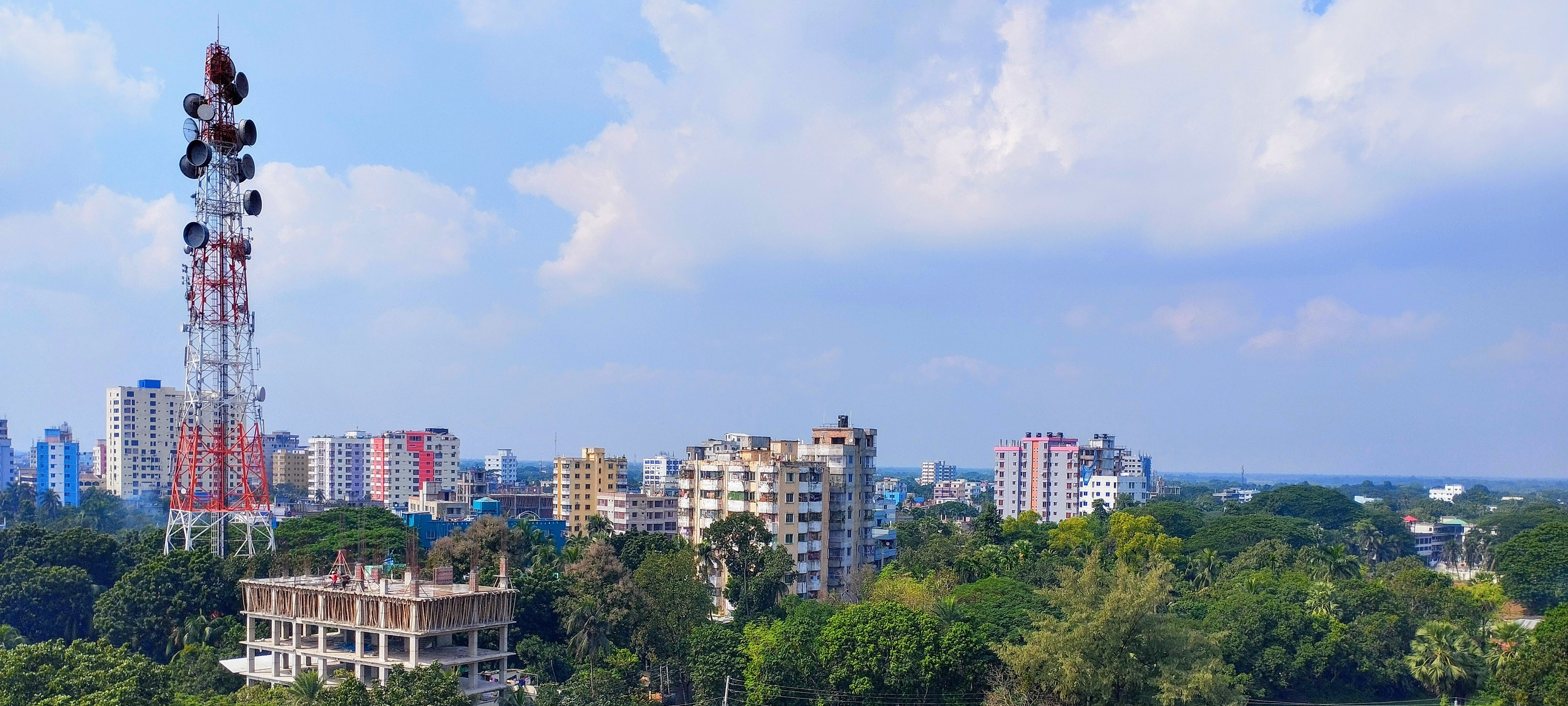
- Diabetic Association Medical College Independence Square Jubilee Tank Circuit House Kumar River Busiest Thana Road

- Location in Bangladesh Faridpur (Bangladesh)
- Coordinates: 23.602°N 89.833°E
- Country: Bangladesh
- Division: Dhaka
- District: Faridpur
- Upazila: Faridpur Sadar

Government
  - Type: Mayor–Council
  - Body: Faridpur Municipality

Area
  - Total: 26.65 km^{2} (10.29 sq mi)

Population (2022)
  - Total: 237,266
  - Density: 8,903/km^{2} (23,060/sq mi)
- Time zone: UTC+6 (Bangladesh Time)
- Postal code: 7800
- National Dialing Code: +880 /0631

Faridpur is a city located in southern Bangladesh. It is the largest municipality in Dhaka Division in the city proper. It is a major commercial hub in southern Bangladesh and the headquarters of Faridpur District and Faridpur Sadar Upazila.

== History ==
Faridpur was formerly known as Fatehabad. Faridpur is named after Shah Farid (Sheikh Fariduddin), disciple of the famous saint and dervish Khwaja Main Chishti and famous Sufi saint of Faridpur.

== Location ==
It has an area of 26.65 km^{2} and a population of 237,266. Faridpur is Bangladesh's proposed ninth division & thirteenth city corporation.

== Demographics ==
Religions in Faridpur (2022)
Religion	Percent
Islam	87.35%
Hinduism	12.26%
Other or not stated	0.39%

According to the 2022 Bangladeshi census, Faridpur had 57,344 households and a population of 237,266. Faridpur had a literacy rate (age 7 and over) of 81.87%, compared to the national average of 74.8%, and a sex ratio of 998 females per 1000 males.

== Climate ==
Climate data for Faridpur (1991–2020, extremes 1883-present)
Month	Jan	Feb	Mar	Apr	May	Jun	Jul	Aug	Sep	Oct	Nov	Dec	Year
Record high °C (°F)	30.3 (86.5)	36.0 (96.8)	39.3 (102.7)	41.2 (106.2)	40.4 (104.7)	37.6 (99.7)	37.5 (99.5)	36.6 (97.9)	37.4 (99.3)	36.5 (97.7)	34.5 (94.1)	30.6 (87.1)	41.2 (106.2)
Mean daily maximum °C (°F)	24.2 (75.6)	28.2 (82.8)	32.7 (90.9)	34.5 (94.1)	33.9 (93.0)	32.9 (91.2)	32.0 (89.6)	32.1 (89.8)	32.3 (90.1)	31.9 (89.4)	29.6 (85.3)	25.8 (78.4)	30.8 (87.4)
Daily mean °C (°F)	17.4 (63.3)	21.2 (70.2)	25.9 (78.6)	28.6 (83.5)	29.0 (84.2)	29.1 (84.4)	28.8 (83.8)	29.0 (84.2)	28.8 (83.8)	27.5 (81.5)	23.7 (74.7)	19.3 (66.7)	25.7 (78.3)
Mean daily minimum °C (°F)	11.9 (53.4)	15.2 (59.4)	19.9 (67.8)	23.5 (74.3)	24.6 (76.3)	25.8 (78.4)	26.1 (79.0)	26.2 (79.2)	25.9 (78.6)	24.0 (75.2)	19.1 (66.4)	14.2 (57.6)	21.4 (70.5)
Record low °C (°F)	4.1 (39.4)	8.2 (46.8)	11.6 (52.9)	17.0 (62.6)	18.6 (65.5)	21.3 (70.3)	21.5 (70.7)	22.4 (72.3)	21.8 (71.2)	16.3 (61.3)	12.5 (54.5)	7.5 (45.5)	4.1 (39.4)
Average precipitation mm (inches)	9 (0.4)	24 (0.9)	29 (1.1)	97 (3.8)	203 (8.0)	299 (11.8)	375 (14.8)	304 (12.0)	239 (9.4)	153 (6.0)	35 (1.4)	9 (0.4)	1,776 (69.9)
Average precipitation days (≥ 1 mm)	2	2	3	7	13	17	22	20	17	8	2	1	114
Average relative humidity (%)	77	72	67	72	79	85	87	85	85	82	78	78	79
Mean monthly sunshine hours	209.3	223.2	241.3	237.3	217.1	165.7	149.5	163.3	167.2	217.4	232.2	214.6	2,438.1
Source 1: NOAA
Source 2: Bangladesh Meteorological Department (humidity 1981-2010)

== See also ==
- Upazilas of Bangladesh
- Districts of Bangladesh
- Divisions of Bangladesh
- Upazila
- Thana
