= Khaliquzzaman Elias =

Bangladeshi writer and translator

- খলিকুজ্জামান ইলিয়াস
- Education: University of Dhaka; Howard University

Khaliquzzaman M. Elias is a Bangladeshi writer. He won Bangla Academy Literary Award in 2011 in the translation category. He is currently serving as a faculty member of the Department of English and modern Languages at North South University.

== Education and career ==
Elias completed his master's from the University of Dhaka in 1973. He earned his PhD from Howard University in 1989.

== Awards ==
- Bangladesh Shishu Academy Award (1984)
- Bangla Academy Literary Award (2011)
