= Yusuf Ali Chowdhury =

Bangladeshi politician

Yusuf Ali Chowdhury ইউসুফ আলী চৌধুরী
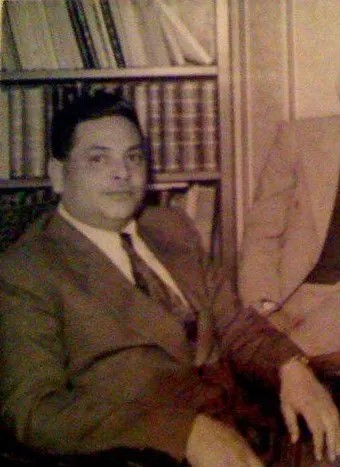
- Chowdhury during the 1950s

Member of the Bengal Legislative Assembly
- In office 1937–1945
- Succeeded by: Chowdhury Shamsuddin Ahmed
- Constituency: Faridpur East

Personal details
- Born: 1905 Faridpur, Bengal Presidency, British Raj
- Died: 26 November 1971 (aged 65–66) Karachi, Pakistan
- Party: Muslim League; Krishak Praja Party; Pakistan Democratic Party
- Children: Chowdhury Kamal Ibne Yusuf; Chowdhury Akmal Ibne Yusuf
- Parent: Chowdhury Moyezuddin Biwshash (father)
- Relatives: Chowdhury Abd-Allah Zaheeruddin (brother); Dudu Miyan II (uncle)

Yusuf Ali Chowdhury (1905 – 26 November 1971), commonly known as Mohan Mia, was a leading Muslim League politician from Bengal. He campaigned for Bengali Muslim civil rights in British India. Hailing from a prominent landowning clan of Faridpur, he was elected to the Bengal Legislative Assembly in 1937. He was a leader of the Pakistan movement and the Bengal Provincial Muslim League.

Chowdhury became the first General Secretary of the Muslim League in East Bengal after the partition of India in 1947. He later joined the Krishak Praja Party led by A. K. Fazlul Huq. He supported the Bengali language movement in 1952. Chowdhury gained a reputation as the "kingmaker" of Bengali and Pakistani politics due to his coalition forming skills, as the United Front parties depended on him to organize political alliances. He was a member of the Constituent Assembly of Pakistan, the East Pakistan Provincial Assembly, and the National Assembly of Pakistan.

In 1970, Chowdhury joined the Pakistan Democratic Party led by Nurul Amin. He died in Karachi on 26 November 1971. His son Chowdhury Kamal Ibne Yusuf was a politician of the Bangladesh Nationalist Party (BNP).

== Early life ==
Chowdhury was born in 1905 at the Moyez Manzil, which was part of the Amirabad Estate, Faridpur. He belonged to a prominent landowning family. His father was the merchant-zamindar Chowdhury Moyezuddin Biwshash. He studied till class ten in Ishan School, Faridpur. He was married to Ferdousi Begum. His older brother Lal Mia was a reputed activist of the Congress Party and later the Muslim League. In contrast to his older brother, Mohan Mia himself was always geared towards Muslim League politics. Mohan Mia became a Bengali Muslim nationalist.

== Career ==
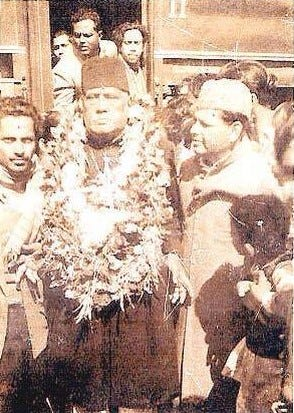
A. K. Fazlul Huq (center) being welcomed by Chowdhury (right) at a Faridpur railway station in 1954

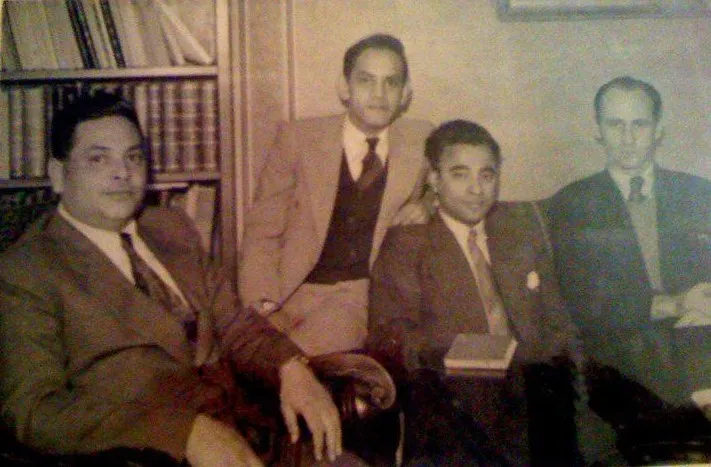
Chowdhury (first from left) with associates in London

Chowdhury became involved in politics during his student life. He vigorously campaigned to remove the pro-Hindu ban on cattle slaughter and beef production in Faridpur imposed by the British Raj. The ban was imposed to appease Hindu landowners who constituted an influential group in the district. Chowdhury capitalized on Bengali Muslim sentiment against Hindu landlords. Despite being a zamindar himself, Chowdhury represented the grievances and aspirations of Muslim peasants, tenants, farmers and workers. He was the Chairman of Faridpur District Board for 17 years; the board later became the district council. He was an important organiser of the Pakistan movement and All-India Muslim League. In 1937 he was elected to the Bengal Legislative Assembly. From 1941 to 1953 he served as the President of the Faridpur district unit of Muslim League. From 1941 to 1947, he was part of the Working Committee of the Bengal Muslim League.

From 1947 to 1952, he served as the first General Secretary of the East Bengal Muslim League. In 1948, he advised Muhammad Ali Jinnah against declaring Urdu as the sole state language by ignoring Bangla. He was expelled from the League and joined the Krishak Sramik Party during the Bengali language movement. In 1950, he was elected to the Pakistan Constituent Assembly. In 1954, he was elected to the East Pakistan Provincial Assembly. He served as the Minister of Agriculture, Minister of Jute, and the Minister of Environment and Forests in the cabinet of A. K. Fazlul Huq. He became a member of the National Assembly of Pakistan after 1956. Chowdhury was a key figure in the United Front. Suhrawardy and Huq visited his estate for political rallies. Chowdhury was known as the kingmaker of East Pakistan because he was an astute tactician in forming coalition governments involving parties of the United Front, including the Awami League, Krishak Sramik Party, and other parties. He helped launch the Krishak Praja Party under Huq's leadership in 1957. He played a key role in the formation of the National Democratic Front and Pakistan Democratic Movement. He joined the Pakistan Democratic Party led by Nurul Amin in the 1960s. He served as the vice president of Pakistan Democratic Party. He helped in the formation of the Democratic Action Committee which presented demands to President Ayub Khan at the Roundtable Conference in 1969. He boycotted the 1970 Pakistan General Election which was won by the Awami League. After the start of Bangladesh Liberation War in 1971, Chowdhury used his contacts in the Pakistan Army, including Major General Rao Farman Ali, to lobby for the release of Bengali political prisoners.

== Death and legacy ==
His son, Chowdhury Kamal Ibne Yusuf, served as the Minister of Food and Disaster Management in the Bangladesh Nationalist Party government. Another son, Chowdhury Akmal Ibne Yusuf, served as a Jatiya Sangsad member representing the Faridpur-4 constituency during 2001–2006 BNP government of Khaleda Zia.

According to an article in the Bangladeshi newspaper, The Daily Star, the following is said about Chowdhury:

If any politician of this country is to be remembered for uncommon qualities of head and heart and for nearly half a century of dedicated and selfless public service, the name of Yusuf Ali Chowdhury comes to the fore. He knew from his own commitment to the cause of the Bengali language and the issue of political, economic and social justice for the Bengali people that liberation was imminent and it would need all the wisdom and efforts of the people and the political leaders to reconstruct the shattered land and take it on to the path of progress and prosperity. The post-liberation Bangladesh surely needed the services of an extraordinarily wise, selfless and incorruptible politician like Mohan Mia.
