= Faridpur Sadar Upazila =

Faridpur Sadar ফরিদপুর সদর
- Upazila
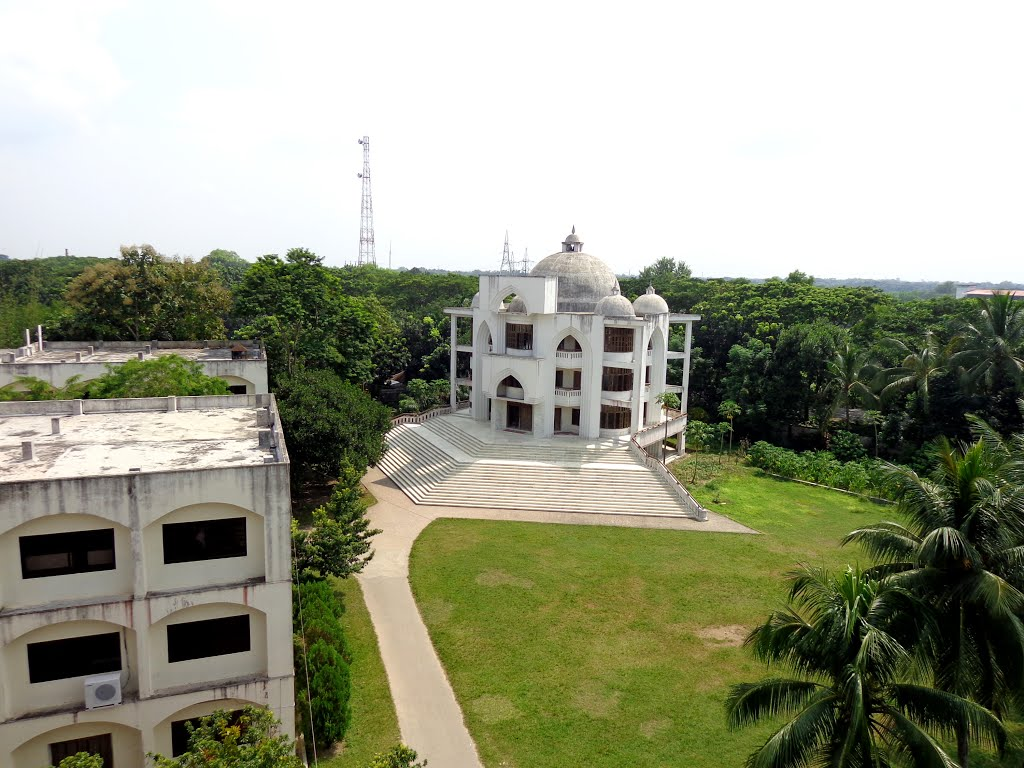
- Muslim Mission Jame Masjid, Faridpur

- Coordinates: 23°35.748′N 89°49.836′E
- Country: Bangladesh
- Division: Dhaka
- District: Faridpur

Government
  - Present MP (2026-present): Nayab Yusuf
  - Previous MP: Chowdhury Kamal Ibne Yusuf

Area
  - Total: 412.86 km^{2} (159.41 sq mi)

Population (2022)
  - Total: 567,657
  - Density: 1,374.9/km^{2} (3,561.1/sq mi)
- Time zone: UTC+6 (BST)
- Postal code: 7800
- Area code: 0631
- Website: Official Map of Faridpur Sadar

Faridpur Sadar Upazila mauza geocode map

Faridpur Sadar Upazila (Bengali: ফরিদপুর সদর) is an upazila (sub-district) of Faridpur District in Dhaka, Bangladesh. It contains Faridpur city near the banks of the Padma River.

One of 18 registered red-light districts in Bangladesh is located in Faridpur. About 800 women and girls live and work there.

== Geography ==
Faridpur Sadar is located at 23.5958°N 89.8306°E. It has 103,535 households and a total area of 412.86 km^{2}.

== Demographics ==
Religions in Faridpur Sadar Upazila (2022)
Religion	Percent
Islam	90.57%
Hinduism	9.25%
Other or not stated	0.18%

According to the 2022 Bangladeshi census, Faridpur Sadar Upazila had 137,001 households and a population of 567,657. 9.01% of the population were under 5 years of age. Faridpur Sadar had a literacy rate (age 7 and over) of 74.84%: 76.35% for males and 73.37% for females, and a sex ratio of 97.84 males for every 100 females. 268,892 (47.37%) lived in urban areas.

As of the 2011 Census of Bangladesh, Faridpur Sadar upazila had 103,535 households and a population of 469,410. 98,376 (20.96%) were under 10 years of age. Faridpur Sadar had an average literacy rate of 55.85%, compared to the national average of 51.8%, and a sex ratio of 991 females per 1000 males. 122,425 (26.08%) of the population lived in urban areas.

At the 1991 Bangladesh census, Faridpur Sadar had a population of 335,386, of whom 176,469 were aged 18 or older. Males constituted 51.91% of the population, and females 48.09%. Faridpur Sadar had an average literacy rate of 34.2% (7+ years), against the national average of 32.4%.

== Administration ==
Faridpur Sadar Upazila is divided into Faridpur Municipality and 11 union parishads: Aliabad, Ambikapur, Char Madhabdia, Decreer Char, Greda, Ishan Gopalpur, Kaijuri, Kanaipur, Krishnanagar, Maj Char, and Uttar Channel. The union parishads are subdivided into 157 mauzas and 342 villages.

Faridpur Municipality is subdivided into 9 wards and 41 mahallas.

=== Elected chairmen of Faridpur Upazila Council ===
- Imran Hossain Chowdhury (Jatiya Party) [1984–1989]
- Advocate Alhajj Md. Shamsul Haque (Bhola Master) (Awami League)
- Khondker Mohtesham Hossain Babor (Awami League) [Acting Upazila chairman, Faridpur Sadar Upazila]

== Notable residents ==
- Abdus Salam Khan, Minister of Public Works and Communication (1955–1956) in the East Pakistan provincial cabinet

== See also ==
- Upazilas of Bangladesh
- Districts of Bangladesh
- Divisions of Bangladesh
- Administrative geography of Bangladesh
