= List of Muslim writers and poets =

This is a list of notable Muslim writers and poets.

== Writers and poets ==
=== A ===
- Arshadul Qadri (Indian)
- Ahmed Raza Khan Barelvi (Indian)
- Aamer Hussein (Pakistani)
- Abbas el-Akkad (Egyptian)
- Abdul Rahman Munif (Jordanian)
- Abdullahi dan Fodio (Nigerian)
- Abdullah Khan (Indian)
- Abdulah Sidran (Bosniak)
- Abid Azad (Bangladeshi)
- Abul Ala Maududi (Maulana Maududi) (Pakistani)
- Abul Hasan (poet) (Bangladeshi)
- Abu'l Hasan Mihyar al-Daylami (Persian)
- Abu Hena Mustafa Kamal (Bangladeshi)
- Abul Kalam Azad (Indian)
- Abu Nuwas (Arab Persian)
- Abu Tammam (Syrian Arab)
- Abu Zafar Obaidullah (Bangladeshi)
- Aga Shahid Ali (Indian American)
- Ahmad Ibn Arabshah (Syrian Arab)
- Ahmed Ali (Pakistani)
- Ahmed Sofa (Bangladesh)
- Ahsan Habib (Bangladeshi)
- Ali Sardar Jafri (Indian)
- Akbar S. Ahmed (Pakistani American)
- Ayad Akhtar (Pakistani American)
- Akhtaruzzaman Elias (Bangladeshi)
- Alaol (modern-day Bangladeshi)
- Al-Hallaj (Persian Sufi)
- Al-Hariri of Basra (Basra, Iraq)
- Al-Mutanabbi (Kufa, Iraq)
- Al-Jahiz (Basra, Iraq)
- Al Mahmud (Poet, Bangladesh)
- Alamgir Hashmi (Pakistani)
- Aqeel-ul-Gharavi (Indian)
- Asma Gull Hasan (American)
- Azizul Haque (Indian)

=== B ===
- Bakhtiyar Vahabzadeh (Azerbaijani)
- Bande Ali Mia (Bangladeshi)
- Basharat Peer (Indian)
- Begum Rokeya (India/Bangladesh)
- Belal Muhammad (Bangladeshi)
- Bilkisu Funtuwa (Nigerian)
- Boonaa Mohammed (Ethiopian)
- Brother Dash (American)

=== D ===
- Dawud Wharnsby (Canadian)
- Dalia Mogahed (Egyptian American)
- Daniel Moore (American)
- Dina Aziz (British Bangladeshi)

=== E ===
- Enamul Karim Nirjhar (Bangladeshi)

=== F ===
- Ferdowsi (Persian)
- Fareed Zakaria (Indian American)
- Faisal Kutty (Indo-Canadian)
- Farrukh Ahmed (Bangladeshi)
- Fatima Mernissi (Moroccan)
- Fazal Shahabuddin (Bangladeshi)
- Fazlul Haque Amini (Bangladeshi)
- Fazza (UAE poet)

=== G ===
- G. Willow Wilson (American)
- Ghalib (Indian)
- Ghulam Azam (Bangladesh)
- Ghulam Mustafa Khan (Pakistani)
- Ghulam Ahmad Parwez (Pakistani)

=== H ===
- Hafiz (Persian)
- Hafiz Rashid Khan (Bangladeshi)
- Hanifa Deen (Australian, Pakistani origin)
- Hasan Hafizur Rahman (Bangladeshi)
- Hashim Amir Ali (Hyderabad, India)
- Helal Hafiz (Bangladeshi)
- Humayun Ahmed (Bangladeshi)
- Humayun Azad (Bangladeshi)
- Humayun Kabir (Indian)
- Huseyn Javid (Azerbaijani)

=== I ===
- Ibn al-Nafis (Syrian Arab)
- Ibn Quzman (Al-Andalus,Spain)
- Imtiaz Dharker (British-Pakistani)

=== J ===
- Jafar Jabbarly (Azerbaijani)
- Jalaluddin Umri (Indian)
- Jamila al-'Alayili (Egyptian)
- Jasimuddin (Bangladeshi)
- Javed Akhtar (Indian)
- Joel Hayward (British)

=== K ===
- Kabir (Indian Sufi)
- Muhammad Mojlum Khan (British-Bangladeshi)
- Kan Chun (also known as Mohamad Omar) (Burmese)
- Kaykobad (Bangladesh)(also known as Kazem Ali Quereshi)
- Kazi Kader Newaj (Bangladesh)
- Kazi Nazrul Islam (India /Bangladesh)
- Khaled Hosseini (Afghan-American)
- Khondakar Ashraf Hossain (Bangladeshi)
- Khurram Murad (Pakistan)
- Khurshidbanu Natavan (Azerbaijan)
- Kyar Ba Nyein (Myanmar)
- Jamilah Kolocotronis (America)

=== L ===
- Leila Aboulela (Sudanese)

=== M ===
- Maghfoor Ahmad Ajazi (Indian)
- Mahmoud Darwish (Palestinian)
- Mak Dizdar (Bosnia and Herzegovina)
- Malique Ibrahim (Malysian)
- Marmaduke Pickthall (British)
- Martin Lings (British)
- Maryam Sullivan (American)
- Maung Thaw Ka (Burmese)
- Mawlana Faizani (Afghan)
- May Ziadeh (Lebanese,she is a Maronite Christian)
- Meša Selimović (Bosnian)
- Melody Moezzi (Iranian-American)
- Michael Wolfe (American)
- Michael Muhammad Knight (American)
- Minyoon Shah Inat (Nasarpur, Sindh, Pakistan)
- Mir Mosharraf Hossain (Bangladeshi)
- Mirza Abul Fazl (Allahabad, India)
- Mirza Fatali Akhundov (Iranian Azerbaijanis)
- Mirza Alakbar Sabir (Azerbaijani,born in Russian Empire)
- Mizanur Rahman Sayed (Bangladesh)
- Modibbo Raji (Niger)
- Mohja Kahf (Syrian-American)
- Mona Eltahawy (Egyptian-American)
- Morteza Motahari (Iranian)
- Motiur Rahman Nizami (Bangladesh)
- Motiur Rahman Mollik (Bangladeshi)
- Mohammed Mozammel Haque (West Bengal India; 1860-1933)
- Mozid Mahmud (Bangladeshi)
- Mohammad Anwar Shopiani (India)
- Muhammad Asad (Non-National Pakistani,born in Ukraine)
- Muhammad Asadullah Al-Ghalib (Bangladesh)
- Muhammed Bello (Nigerian)
- Muhammed Fethullah Gulen (Turkish)
- Sir Muhammad Iqbal (British India)
- Murad Wilfred Hofmann (German)
- Musa Ćazim Ćatić (Bosnia and Herzegovina)

=== N ===
- Naim Frashëri (Albanian)
- Na'ima B Robert (British-South African)
- Naguib Mahfouz (Nobel Prize in Literature, 1988) (Egyptian)
- Ali Akbar Natiq (Pakistani)
- Nezami Aruzi (Persian, born in Uzbekistan)
- Nilima Ibrahim (Bangladeshi)
- Nizami Ganjavi (Persian,born in Azerbaijan)
- Nouman Ali Khan (American,Pakistani origin)
- Nimah Ismail Nawwab (Malaysian,Saudi Arabian origin)

=== O ===
- Omar Khayyám (Persian)
- Orhan Pamuk (Nobel Prize in Literature, 2006) (Turkish)

=== R ===
- Rajaa al-Sanea (Saudi Arabian)
- Ian Iqbal Rashid (Tanzanian)
- Ruqaiyyah Waris Maqsood (British)
- Rumi (Persian poet,birthplace is in Tajikistan)
- Riaz Ahmed Gohar Shahi (Pakistani)

=== S ===
- Sa'adi (Persian)
- Saheb Qibla Fultali (Bangladeshi)
- Saffarzadeh, Tahereh (Iranian)
- Safvet-beg Bašagić (Bosnian)
- Salman Rushdie (British-Indian)
- Shah Abdul Latif Bhittai (Sindh, Pakistan)
- Shah Ahmad Shafi (Bangladeshi)
- Shah Muhammad Sagir (Bangladeshi)
- Shamsur Rahman (Bangladeshi)
- Shaheed Quaderi (Bangladeshi)
- Shahnaz Bashir (Indian)
- Shaikh Ayaz (Sindh, Pakistan)
- U Shwe Yoe (a Burmese Muslim named U Ba Ga Lay. He was also a cartoonist, actor, comedian and dancer.)
- Sikdar Aminul Haq (Bangladeshi)
- Soheib Bencheikh (French Saudi Arabian)
- Stephen Schwartz (American)
- Suhaiymah Manzoor-Khan (British spoken word poet, writer, and speaker) (British,Pakistani origin)
- Sultan Bahoo (Sufi writer and poet from Punjab, Pakistan)
- Sufi Barkat Ali (Punjab, Pakistan)
- Syed Shamsul Huq (Bangladeshi)
- Syed Waliullah (Bangladeshi)

=== T ===
- Taha Hussein (Egyptian)
- Tariq Rahman (Pakistan)

=== U ===
* Usman dan Fodio (Nigerian)
- Uzeyir Hajibeyov (Azerbaijani)

=== Y ===
- Yahiya Emerick (American)
- Yunus Emre (Turkish)
- Yusuf al-Khal (Syrian)
- Yusuf Balasagun (Turkic,native of Kyrgyzstan)

=== Z ===
- Zaib-un-Nissa Hamidullah (Pakistani)
- Zaid Shakir (American)
- Zoubeida Bittari (Algerian)
- Zuko Džumhur (Bosnian)

== See also ==
- Arabic poetry
- Islamic architecture
- Islamic art history
- Islamic calligraphy
- Islamic fiction
- Islamic literature
- Islamic music
- Islamic pottery
- List of Moroccan writers
- List of Muslim painters
- List of Muslims
- List of people by belief
