= Syeda Sajeda Chowdhury =

Bangladeshi politician (1935–2022)

- সৈয়দা সাজেদা চৌধুরী
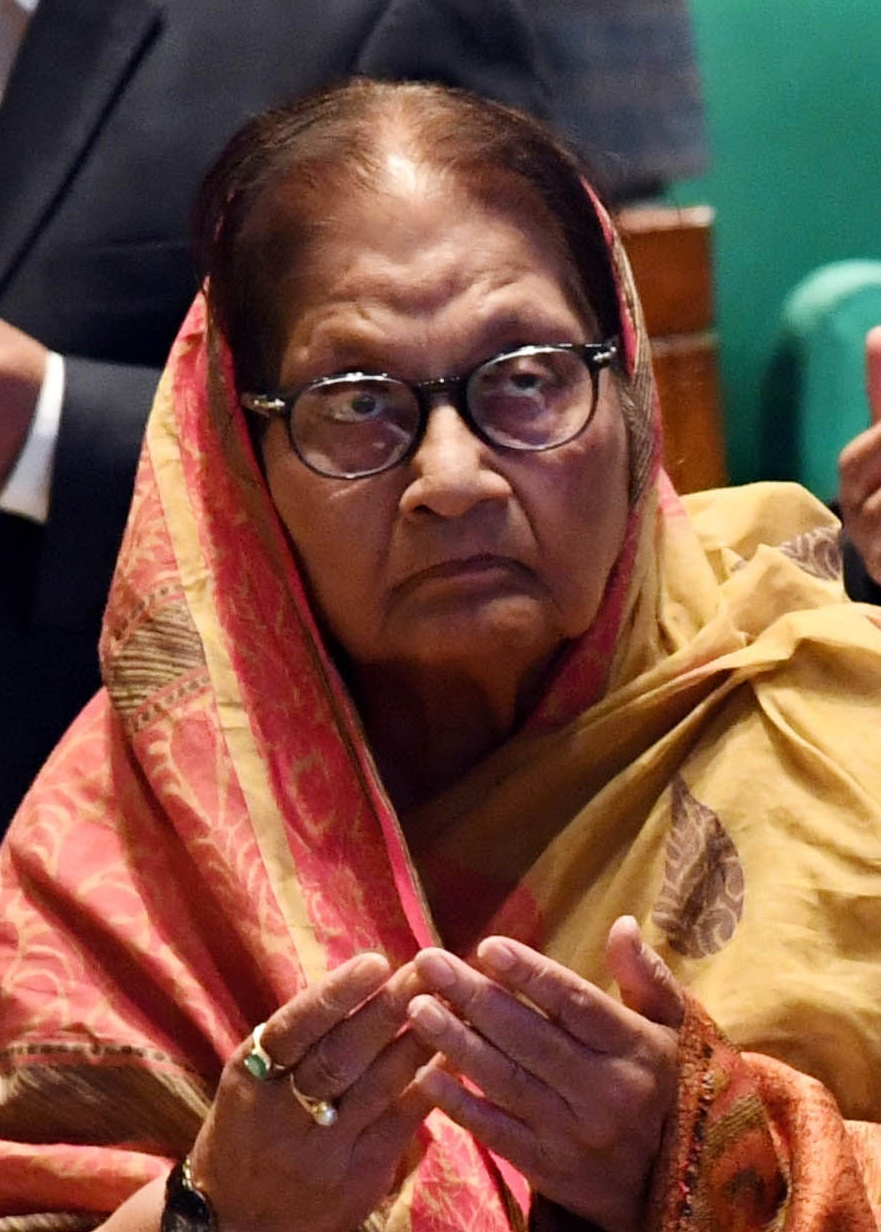
- Sajeda Chowdhury in 2019

Member of Parliament for Faridpur-2
- In office 12 February 2008 – 11 September 2022
- Preceded by: KM Obaidur Rahman
- Succeeded by: Shahdab Akbar Chowdhury
- In office 5 March 1991 – 4 November 1995
- Preceded by: Saifuzzaman Chowdhury Jewel
- Succeeded by: Abul Hossain Mia

Minister of Forest and Environment
- In office 23 June 1996 – 15 July 2001
- Preceded by: Akbar Hossain
- Succeeded by: Shajahan Siraj

Member of the Bangladesh Parliament for Reserved Women's Seat–9
- In office 7 April 1973 – 6 November 1975
- Preceded by: Position created

7th General Secretary Of Awami League
- In office 24 March 1982 – 5 January 1992
- President: Sheikh Hasina
- Preceded by: Abdur Razzaq
- Succeeded by: Zillur Rahman

Personal details
- Born: Syeda Sajeda; 8 May 1935 Magura, Bengal Presidency, British India
- Died: 11 September 2022 (aged 87) Dhaka, Bangladesh
- Party: Bangladesh Awami League
- Spouse: Golam Akbar Chowdhury
- Children: Shahdab Akbar Chowdhury (son)
- Relatives: Syed Qamarul Ahsan (uncle); Syed Rahmatur Rob Irtiza Ahsan (cousin)
- Occupation: Politician

Syeda Sajeda Chowdhury (8 May 1935 – 11 September 2022) was a Bangladeshi politician who served as the Deputy Leader of the Jatiya Sangsad from 2009 to 2022. She served as a Jatiya Sangsad member representing the Faridpur-2 constituency from 2008 till her death in 2022. She also served as the Environment and Forest Minister of Bangladesh during 1996–2001. She was also the first and only female general secretary of the Bangladesh Awami League, serving from 1986 to 1992.

== Early life and family ==
Syeda Sajeda was born on 8 May 1935 in her maternal home in Magura (formerly under Jessore District) in the then Bengal Presidency in British India. Both of her parents, Syed Shah Hamidullah and Syeda Asiya Khatun, were Bengali Muslims of Syed extraction. Her paternal grandmother, Syeda Hamidunnesa, belonged to a Bengali Muslim zamindar family known as the Syeds of Bamna based in Barguna.

Chowdhury had a bachelor's degree.

== Political career ==
Chowdhury was a member of the 1st Jatiya Sangsad holding a reserved women's seat during 1973–1975. Chowdhury became the Jatiya Sangsad member from the Faridpur-2 constituency in 2008, being re-elected in 2014 and 2018. She became the Deputy Leader of the House of Jatiya Sangsad on 12 February 2019 for the third consecutive term.

Chowdhury became the deputy leader of the House of Bangladesh Parliament in February 2009. She is only woman politician who served as General Secretary of Bangladesh Awami League from 1986 and held the position till 1992. Since then she was inducted into the Presidium.

Chowdhury was awarded Independence Day Award in 2010 by the Government of Bangladesh.

=== Corruption allegation ===
On 10 July 2008, the Anti-Corruption Commission (ACC) filed a case against Chowdhury over concealing wealth worth Tk 1.38 million and amassing it illegally. Chowdhury denied the allegation. On 18 November 2008, Bangladesh High Court stayed the proceedings against her in the case which was again upheld by the Supreme Court on 15 February 2010. She was granted bail by the High Court. On 29 November 2010, High Court revoked the proceedings of the case on the grounds that the charges against Chowdhury were not specifically disclosed in the case.

== Personal life ==
Syeda Sajeda married Golam Akbar Chowdhury (d. 2015). Their youngest son, Shahdab Akbar Chowdhury, was sentenced to 12 years' imprisonment by a special court in 2008 for amassing wealth illegally and concealing information in his wealth statement submitted to the ACC.

Chowdhury died from complications of COVID-19 in Dhaka on 11 September 2022 aged 87. After her death, her son, Shahdab, selected by Awami League, ran for the vacant parliamentary position in by-poll election held on 5 November 2022.
