= Islamic fiction =

Islamic fiction is a literary genre that incorporates Islamic themes, values, and worldviews within fictional narratives. It often reflects the cultural, moral, and spiritual elements of Islam, aiming to entertain while promoting ethical and religious teachings, or serve to make Muslims visible.

== Definition ==
Islamic fiction refers to creative, imaginative, non-preachy fiction books written by Muslims and marketed primarily to Muslims. Islamic fiction may be marketed to mainstream markets as well. The content of these books will likely incorporate some religious content and themes, and may include non-fictionalized historical or factual Islamic content with or without direct reference to the Qur'an or the Sunnah of Mohammed. The stories may also include modern, real life situations and moral dilemmas.

Authors of Islamic fiction intend for readers to learn something positive about Islam when they read Islamic fiction stories.

Islamic fiction cannot include harmful content: vulgar language, sexually explicit content, un-Islamic practices that are not identified as un-Islamic, or content that portrays Islam in a negative way.

While fiction has been produced throughout the entirety of Muslim history (such as One Thousand and One Nights, the term Islamic fiction has not been used until recently. In 2005 and 2006, the Islamic Writers Alliance (IWA), a professional Muslim organization based in the US with an International membership, took on the work of defining Islamic fiction and determining the criteria to establish it as a fiction subcategory of adult and juvenile fiction. The membership then began the process of identifying published Islamic fiction books that were at that time described as Muslim authored books or children's books in the Muslim book industry. This was done because so many books were getting lost in the previously established classification methods from the BISAC system, that a need for establishing a clear and distinct classification of specialization for this style of literature was realized, and thereby action taken towards a unification of the definition.

== Emergence as a literary form ==
Currently Islamic fiction is not recognized as a category by the Book Industry Standards and Communications (BISAC) coding system; however works from other mainstream fiction genres are found to meet the criteria. For example, Leila Abouzeid’s The Year of The Elephant (Arabic version 1983, English translation 1989), the first work written by a Moroccan woman to be translated to English, has been identified as falling into the sub-categories of being both a feminist novel, and because of its depiction of the protagonist and other characters practicing Islam, qualifying as Islamic fiction.

Amongst the first wave of Islamic fiction (as defined here) written in English specifically for Muslim audiences was juvenile fiction, including the series Invincible Abdullah originally published from 1993-1995 by Aziza and Uthman Hutchinson, and the Ahmad Deen Series (1996) by Yahiya Emerick. The first two English language series of Islamic fiction novels written for teens and adults is Umm Zakiyyah’s Tamika Douglass Trilogy beginning with If I Should Speak (2001) and the Echo Series written by Jamilah Kolocotronis beginning with Echoes (2006). Kolocotronis’ first Islamic fiction title, Innocent People was self-published in 2003. In 2004, Irving Karchmar published the Sufi novel, Master of the Jinn. Linda D. Delgado, prolific author of Islamic fiction in addition to other various works, began writing and publishing the award-winning Islamic Rose series in 2005, with the latest edition of this series last published in early 2012.

== Muslim evaluation ==
While Islamic knowledge presented in Islamic fiction may be taken directly from the Qur'an and traditions of Muhammad, as well as from Islamic history, not all of the Islamic content in these books will be considered factual or acceptable by all Muslim readers. This is due to differences between a Muslim reader and the writers, editors, and publishers with respect to personal practices, beliefs and knowledge, as well as the influence of their schools of thought, cultures, and traditions.

Determining the accuracy and permissibility of Islamic content is the responsibility of every adult Muslim reader. This may differ according to individual differences in school of thought and practice. All Muslim parents, guardians, teachers, and school administrators must determine whether a book's content is halal for their children and students. This Islamic Reminder holds true for all materials a Muslim reads.

== Subgenres ==
Works of Islamic fiction have been written in several fiction genres. Maryam "Umm Juwayriyah" Sullivan's teen/adult novel The Size of a Mustard Seed (2009) is the first known Urban Islamic fiction title. Najiyah Diana Helwani's juvenile Islamic fiction title Sophia's Journal: Time Warp 1857 (2008) has been classified as both a historical fiction novel as well as science fiction. The seminal juvenile fiction series Invincible Abdullah and Ahmad Deen are both written in mystery styles. MuslimMatters.org, a popular multi-author Muslim blog, has published a series of genre-blending novels by Wael Abdelgawad that draw from the Islamic fiction, action, mystery and thriller categories.

== Short stories ==
Some Islamic fiction shorts can be found amongst other works in mainstream or special-interest anthologies, such as collections of Arab or South Asian writers, but very few anthologies and venues exclusively feature Islamic fiction shorts and poetry. The Islamic Writers Alliance (IWA) has produced two anthology titles of Islamic fiction and poetry, Many Poetic Voices, One Faith (2008) and Many Voices, One Faith II – Islamic Fiction Stories (2009). IWA also produces a quarterly online magazine, IWA Magazine (formerly known as Islamic Ink) which features Islamic fiction. Another anthology, Between Love, Hope and Fear published in 2007 by An-Najm Publishers of UK, is a collection of short stories, poetry and essays written by Muslims from around the globe. The American Muslim women's magazine, Azizah, regularly features original short works of Islamic fiction and poetry. Damazine is a quarterly online literary journal which publishes Muslim-related fiction (including Islamic fiction), creative nonfiction and poetry.

== Awards ==
Several Muslim organizations encourage the creation of Islamic fiction and other creative writing by hosting annual awards for Islamic literary arts. The Islamic Writers Alliance (IWA) began sponsoring poetry contests for children and adults in 2005. As part of its efforts in the cause of promoting literacy with an emphasis on Islamic literature, the IWA also traditionally grants annual awards in the form of book donations to libraries of Islamic Schools. In 2009, IWA added an Islamic fiction section for teens and adults to its contest, and in 2011, it added a non-fiction Essays section which was co-sponsored by Zakat Foundation of America in association with the IWA. Since 2006, the Muslim Writers Awards hosts an annual Muslim Writers contest which accepts submissions for poetry, fiction, screenplay and other literary forms, including young Muslims categories. Select winners of the Muslim Writers Awards have their work published at IslamOnline.

== Notable authors ==
Although the term "Islamic fiction" is rather new in circles of literature and Muslims alike, the art of Islamic fiction is not really so new. Muslim Narratives and the Discourse of English, a study written by Amin Malik and published by State University of New York Press, Albany, in 2005, documents that the first ever work of fiction in English language by a Muslim author was published as early as 1905. Some of these authors write Islamic fiction exclusively for children, while others direct their work to an older audience of Young Adults.

Although more authors are being discovered daily as to having written and published works to come under the classification of Islamic fiction, and so no list is extensively exclusive, to view a more comprehensive listing of these authors, please refer to the external links listed in the External links section of this page.

- Ahmed Ali (writer)
- Jamilah Kolocotronis
- Leila Aboulela
- Leila Abouzeid
- Samina Ali
- Wael Abdelgawad
- Yahiya Emerick

== Controversy ==
There are conflicting views amongst Muslims as to whether reading and writing fictional stories is or is not halal (permissible) within Islam. In fiqh, although not outright considered haram (impermissible), “abandoning busying oneself with [fiction stories] is preferable” and fiction stories are seen as a frivolous way for a Muslim to use their time. Another interpretation is that fictional stories are permissible and even encouraged for purposes of dawah, to help people to learn about Islam, as long as the author has made clear that the story is not true. As well, the writing should be in the style of Islamic fiction.

== See also ==
- List of Muslim writers and poets
- Islamic art history
- Lists of Muslims
- Theological fiction
