= Girls High School, Harare =

School in Zimbabwe

Girls High School Harare ("GHSH") was founded in 1898, the first public school for girls in the city of Salisbury, Rhodesia (now Harare, Zimbabwe). The school can teach over 1,000 girls across all forms, making it the largest girls' high school in Zimbabwe. The school has two boarding houses for girls, called Beit House and Forsyth House. The school celebrated its centenary in 1998 with pomp and a fair. In the year 1998, all the old uniforms were brought back and pupils were given a chance to purchase the many uniforms that the school had in previous years.

The school is located in Harare's central business district.

Girls High School is the sister school to the boys school Prince Edward High School.

The school motto is "Per Ardua Ad Astra" ("Through hard work, we will reach the stars").

The school colours are bottle-yellow and gold. The school uniform for junior girls is the traditional green pinafore with white blouse, and the school for senior girls (A level students) is the traditional "butcher blazer" with stripes, and green skirts.

== Academics and extra-curricular activities ==
The school offers educational certificates for Ordinary Levels (O Levels) and Advanced Levels (A Levels). Subjects offered include:

- Art
- Accounting
- Geography
- Mathematics
- General Science
- Physics
- Biology
- Chemistry
- History
- Management of business
- Divinity
- Shona Language
- French
- Economics
- Food Science
- Fashion & Fabrics
- English Literature
- English Language
- Advanced Mathematics

The school also offers various sporting and extra curricular activities which include the following:

- Drum majorettes
- Debate Society
- Drama Club
- Scripture Union Club
- Action 21 Environmental Club
- Choir
- Marimba Club
- Rotary Club
- Athletics
- Swimming
- Hockey
- Netball
- Tennis
- Rowing
- Softball
- Martial Arts

° WRITERS CLUB

== Notable alumnae ==
- Tracy Cox-Smyth, springboard diver.
- Doris Lessing, CH, OMG novelist and Nobel Laureate.
- Na'ima B. Robert (born Thando Mclaren), author.
- Liz Chase, field hockey player
- Tabetha Kanengoni-Malinga, businesswoman and politician

Tasunungurwa Rejoice Nelly Mavhunga
