= StepAway Magazine =

British literary journal

- Categories: Literary magazine
- First issue: January 2011
- Country: UK
- Based in: Newcastle upon Tyne
- Language: English
- Website: www.stepawaymagazine.com

StepAway Magazine is a Newcastle upon Tyne based online English literary journal. It was founded in January 2011 by the British writer, researcher and literary reviewer, Darren Richard Carlaw.

The journal publishes poetry and flash fiction about walking in an urban environment. StepAway Magazine takes its name from a flâneur poem by Frank O’Hara entitled “A Step Away from Them” from the collection Lunch Poems.

Key contributors have included James Robison, Sarah Schulman, Lemn Sissay, Maryam Sullivan, Van G. Garrett, and Richard Thomas.

The magazine's cover art has featured the work of Life magazine photographer Roger Minick, and British artist Paul Baines.

== See also ==
- List of literary magazines
