= Shama Obaed =

Bangladeshi politician

- শামা ওবায়েদ
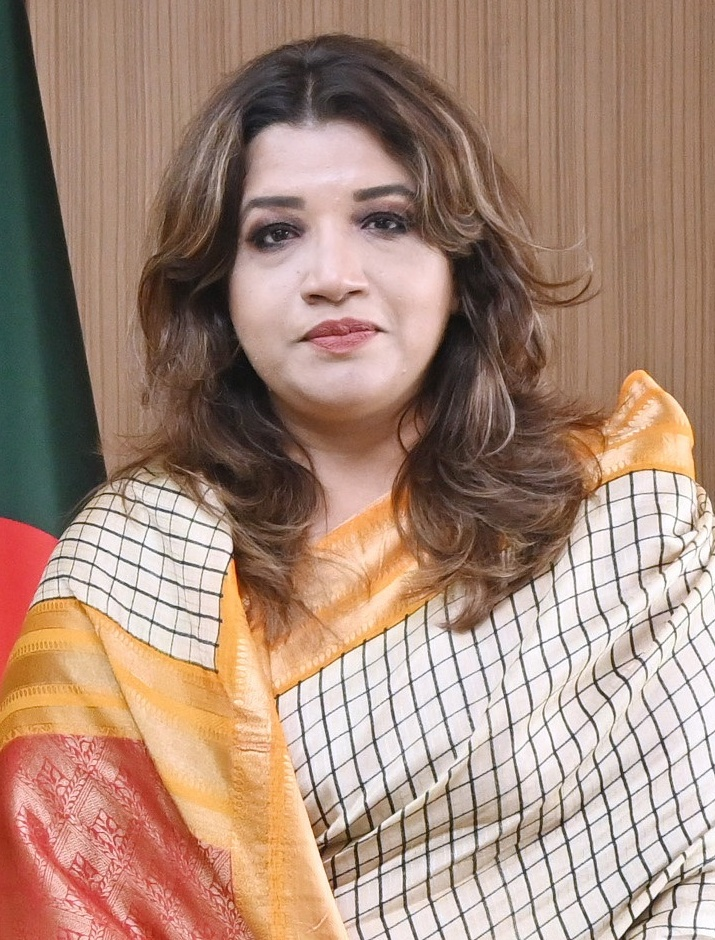
- Obaed in 2026

Minister of State for Foreign Affairs-2
- Incumbent
- Assumed office 17 February 2026 Serving with Humaiun Kobir
- Prime Minister: Tarique Rahman
- Preceded by: Mohammad Sufiur Rahman

Member of Parliament
- Incumbent
- Assumed office 17 February 2026
- Preceded by: Shahdab Akbar Chowdhury
- Constituency: Faridpur-2

Personal details
- Born: Shama Obaed; 14 May 1973 (age 53) Faridpur, Bangladesh
- Party: Bangladesh Nationalist Party
- Spouse: Shovon Islam
- Children: 2
- Parent: KM Obaidur Rahman (father)
- Education: California State University; University of Phoenix
- Nickname: Rinku

Shama Obaed Islam (née Obaed; born 14 May 1973) is a Bangladeshi politician. She is the incumbent Jatiya Sangsad member representing the Faridpur-2 constituency (Nagarkanda-Saltha) and the incumbent state minister of foreign affairs since February 2026.

Obaed is one of the seven women elected in the 2026 Bangladeshi general election and one of the three women in the Tarique Ministry.

== Early life ==
Shama Obaed Islam was born into a prominent political family in Bangladesh. Her father, KM Obaidur Rahman, was a veteran politician and an organizer of Bangladesh's liberation movement. He served as the 4th Secretary General of the Bangladesh Nationalist Party and held various ministerial positions. Her mother, Shaheda Obaed, was an educator and the former chairperson of the Board of Intermediate and Secondary Education, Dhaka.

Islam was barred from seeing her ailing father in January 1999 before returning to the United States, where she was living at that time due to her job.

== Education and Professional Career ==
Islam studied at Viqarunnisa Noon School and College before moving to the United States for higher education. She graduated with highest honors, earning a bachelor's degree in computer science from California State University. After graduation, she joined First Union Bank, where she worked in both the financial and technology sectors. In addition, she obtained an MBA from the University of Phoenix.

== Political career ==
Shama Obaed returned to Bangladesh after her father's death and joined her father's party, BNP. She unsuccessfully contested from Faridpur-2, a constituency from which her father was elected several times, comprising Nagarkanda and Saltha Upazilas, in 2008.

In 2010, she became the President of Jatiyotabadi Muktijuddher Projonmo, an organisation representing the descendants of freedom fighters who advocate the cause of Bangladeshi Nationalism. During the Sheikh Hasina regime, she participated in several political protests.

Islam was heavily engaged in the advocacy against the use of EVM in elections in Bangladesh, utilizing her knowledge as a computer scientist to raise awareness against the flaws of the machines and the system. In 2018, the BNP nominated her to contest for the Faridpur-2 constituency. However, the election was widely regarded as flawed and rigged, with Awami League activists allegedly taking control of the polling centres, supported by the police. It was alleged that ballot boxes were stuffed the night before the election.

She was appointed a key member of the party's foreign affairs committee, in which capacity she briefed diplomats in Dhaka on the BNP's position on democratic backsliding during the 2024 election cycle. She was subjected to smear campaigns by pro-Awami League activists for her role during the pro-democracy movement.

In February 2026, Islam won the 2026 Bangladeshi general election contesting at the Faridpur-2 constituency securing 120,909 votes while her nearest rival of the Bangladesh Khelafat Majlis candidate Shah Akram Ali received 87,956 votes.

== Personal life ==
Obaed is married to Mostajirul Shovon Islam who is the managing director of Sparrow Group, a garments manufacturing company. Together they have two children. On 20 November 2025, Obaed formally renounced her United States citizenship ahead of 2026 Bangladeshi general election. Her husband is brother of Awami League politician Choyon Islam.
