= Muslim Writers Awards =

- Awarded for: Recognise the best of British Muslim literary talent
- Date: 28 March 2007
- Location: England
- Country: United Kingdom
- First award: 2007
- Website: www.muslimwritersawards.org.uk

Television/radio coverage
- Network: Islam Channel

Muslim Writers Awards is an annual British award ceremony, which aims to recognise, showcase and celebrate literary talent within the UK's Muslim community. It was established in 2006, with the Young Muslim Award category established in 2010.

Now into its fourth year, the Muslim Writers Awards endeavours to showcase and celebrate literary talent from Muslims across the UK.

== Premise ==
According to the founders of the Muslim Writers Awards, Imran Akram and Faraz Yousufzai, the goal of the Muslim Writers Awards "is to nurture that talent, bring it to the attention of the wider world and then celebrate it. We want to give Muslim writers confidence in their abilities and offer a platform to communicate their experiences and creativity through the power of the pen." The motto for the awards is: "Share stories, come together. It's time, Write Now!"

== 2007 event ==
Birmingham Libraries worked on a creative writers project with writers of Muslim backgrounds. They provided writers with an e-portal where writers can upload their work of any genre online – www.publishingbirmingham.com. They aimed to offer writers the opportunity to develop themselves and earn income from their writing.

To celebrate the work and contribution of British writers, On 28 March 2007, the first annual Muslim Writers Awards took place at the Library Theatre in Birmingham. At the event, Muslim speakers and writers including Qaisra Shahraz, Moazzem Begg, Salma Yaqoob and Faraz Yousufzai spoke about their experiences on getting published.

== 2008 event ==
After 10,000 submissions of work was received in 12 months, on 29 March 2008, the second Muslim Writers Awards event took place on at the International Convention Centre in Birmingham.

The event was organised by Aston-based not-for-profit company Innovate Arts CIC in partnership with Birmingham Libraries, the Islam Channel, which broadcast the ceremony, Yorkshire Bank and Radisson SAS, and it was hosted by Birmingham Mail blogger Faraz Yousufzai.

The ceremony attracted support from the Prime Minister Gordon Brown, local government and celebrity advocates. It was attended by more than 1,000 people including the Lord Mayor of Birmingham, Baroness Sayeeda Warsi and guest of honour Jermaine Jackson, whilst James Caan, who was unable to make the event, greeted the audience with a video message.

The ceremony was broadcast live to millions of viewers across the United Kingdom, Europe and the Middle East by Islam Channel.

Eight awards were handed out to winners, following a review of the 10,000 entries by a panel of independent judges. Winner of the Writer of the Year 2008 Award was 38-year-old Aliya Vaughan from Brixton in London. She was also the recipient of the Best Children's Story Award. The Published Writer of the Year 2008 was former Guntanamo detainee, and Birmingham bookstore owner, Moazzam Begg. In addition, Fatima Martin won the novel award and Solihull writer Kashif Choudry won the Short Story Writer Award. A total of 26 Muslim writers, including novelists, poets, under 16s and journalists, competed for the prizes in the eight categories.

== 2009 event ==
On 27 May 2009, the third Muslim Writers awards took place at the Hilton Hotel on Park Lane in London in partnership with publishers group Penguin Group.

== 2010 event ==
Submissions for the Muslim Writers Awards 2010 event were open from 15 September 2009 to 5 February 2010.

In addition, a new category was announced — the Young Muslim Writers Awards.

== 2011 event ==
On 22 November 2011, the fifth Muslim Writers Awards took place at Shakespeare's Globe in London. The event was supported by Muslim Hands and sponsored by the Penguin Group, Puffin Books, Islam Channel and the Brit Writers Awards. Singer Dawud Wharnsby performance poet zkthepoet performed at the event. Guests included authors Aamer Hussein, Roopa Farooki, Irfan Master and Shelina Zahra Janmohamed amongst wider literary and publishing industry figures.

The entries were submitted for eight categories including novels, short stories, poetry, children's stories, screenplays, blogging and journalism. Shahriar Mandanipour won the published novel category for Censoring an Iranian Love Story whilst Far From Home by Na'ima B. Robert triumphed in the Children's book category. Zkthepoet and Ahmed Masoud were declared as winners in the unpublished poetry and novel categories respectively. But despite the big names in the room it was a lesser known, emerging talent that succeeded in taking home the prize for Muslim Writer of the Year – Tam Hussein, also succeeded in the short story category for his new work, Little Flecks of Silver. The winners were placed in writing programmes and partnered with editors and more established writers who will provide them with mentoring over the next year.

The winners were placed in writing programmes and partnered with editors and more established writers who will provide them with mentoring over the year.

== 2012 event ==
In November 2012, the sixth Muslim Writers Awards took place in London and featured a broad range of categories from screen play to novel writing to journalism.

== Young Muslim Awards ==
=== 2010 event ===
In October 2009, Muslim Writers Awards announced that writers from the ages of eight through to 16 can now enter and winners for both best short story and best poetry categories will be announced at the awards ceremony scheduled for April 2010. The Young Muslim Writers Awards (YMWA) is a project is by Muslim Hands and hosted by the Institute of English Studies.

On 26 May 2010, the Young Muslim Writers Awards took place. The ceremony was attended by shortlisted entrants from across the UK and abroad, with parents, teachers and an array of special guests from the world of publishing and journalism.

The occasion was launched through a live interactive performance of poetry, percussion and painting, choreographed by Mohammed Ali (also known as Aerosol Arabic). The panel of judges include award-winning authors Leila Aboulela (author of Minaret) and children's writers Anna Perera (author of Guantanamo Boy), Bhavit Mehta (author of Laghu the Clever Crow), Sufiya Ahmed (author of the Khadija Academy series) along with best-selling novelist Qaisra Shahraz, Moazzam Begg (author and 2008 MWA writer of the year) and Zahid Hussain (author of The Curry Mile).

Winners of both Best Short story and Best Poetry were revealed at a televised awards ceremony in April 2010. Regional events to highlight the aims and objectives behind the awards took place around the country.

=== 2011 ===
On 1 June 2011, the Young Muslim Writers Awards ceremony was held at Senate House. Speakers at the ceremony included Sue Evans, Director of Development and Fundraising at Booktrust, and Nabil Ahmed, President of the Federation of Student Islamic Societies, who presented an award on behalf of Muslim Community Fund, sponsors of the Young Muslim Writer of the Year Award 2011. The ceremony included live performances by performance poets Wajid Hussain, Radikal Queen, Lubna Iqbal, David Byrne and drummer Shahbaz Ahmed.

=== 2012 ===
- http://www.sultanasdream.com.au/Issue_2012_August/EVENTS_YoungMuslimWritersAward.htm
- http://www.islamicschool.com.au/news_2012-02-20.html

=== 2013 ===
On 2 July 2013 the third Young Muslim Writers Awards ceremony took place at Senate House in London. It was organised by Muslim Hands and held in association with the Yusuf Islam Foundation. This year's panel of judges included award-winning authors Sufiya Ahmed (Secrets of the Henna Girl) and Na'ima B. Robert (Far From Home).

YMWA also organises a series of events over the year in partnership with authors, Local Education Authorities and schools around the country to nurture and develop the writing skills of children, helping them to become better communicators.

== See also ==
- British Muslims
- List of British Muslims
- Muhammad VI Awards for the Holy Quran
