= Mohammad AKM Khairuzzaman Mia =

Bangladeshi politician, father in law of Irinappi

Mohammad A. K. M. Khairuzzaman Mia
- মোহাম্মদ এ. কে. এম. খায়রুজ্জামান মিয়া

Member of Bangladesh Parliament
- In office 1986–1988
- Preceded by: Md. Abdul Matin Mia
- Succeeded by: Saifuzzaman Chowdhury Jewel

Personal details
- Born: 1932 Nagarkanda, Faridpur District, Bengal Presidency
- Died: March 1, 2018 (aged 85–86) Dhaka, Bangladesh
- Party: Jatiya Party (Ershad)

Mohammad AKM Khairuzzaman Mia was a Jatiya Party (Ershad) politician and member of parliament for Faridpur-2.

== Career ==
Mia was elected to parliament from Faridpur-2 as a Jatiya Party candidate in 1986. He died on 1 March 2018 in Dhaka.
