= Faridpur-2 =

Constituency of Bangladesh's Jatiya Sangsad

Coordinates: 23.42°N 89.89°E

- Constituency for the Jatiya Sangsad
- District: Faridpur District
- Division: Dhaka Division
- Electorate: 332,041 (2026)

Current constituency
- Created: 1973
- Party: Bangladesh Nationalist Party
- Member: Shama Obaed
- ← 211 Faridpur-1 213 Faridpur-3 →

Faridpur-2 is a constituency represented in the Jatiya Sangsad (National Parliament) of Bangladesh since 2026 by Shama Obaed of the Bangladesh Nationalist Party.

== Boundaries ==
The constituency encompasses Nagarkanda and Saltha upazilas, and one union parishad of Sadarpur Upazila: Krishnapur.

== History ==
The constituency was created for the first general elections in newly independent Bangladesh, held in 1973.

Ahead of the 2008 general election, the Election Commission redrew constituency boundaries to reflect population changes revealed by the 2001 Bangladesh census. The 2008 redistricting altered the boundaries of the constituency.

== Members of Parliament ==
Election	Member	Party
1973	Khandaker Nurul Islam	Awami League
1979	Md. Abdul Matin Mia	Jatiya Samajtantrik Dal
1986	Mohammad AAM Khairuzzaman Mia	Jatiya Party
1988	Saifuzzaman Chowdhury Jewel	Jatiya Party
1991	Syeda Sajeda Chowdhury	Awami League
Feb 1996	Abul Hossain Mia	Bangladesh Nationalist Party
Jun 1996	KM Obaidur Rahman	Bangladesh Nationalist Party
2001	KM Obaidur Rahman	Bangladesh Nationalist Party
2008	Syeda Sajeda Chowdhury	Awami League
2022 by-election	Shahdab Akbar Chowdhury	Awami League
2026	Shama Obaed	Bangladesh Nationalist Party

== Elections ==
=== Elections in the 2020s ===
General Election 2026: Faridpur-2
Party	Candidate	Votes	%	±%
BNP	Shama Obaed	121,694	56.6	N/A
BKM	Md. Akram Ali	89,305	41.6	N/A
IAB	Shah Md. Jamal Uddin	2,368	1.1	N/A
GOP	Faruk Fakir	675	0.3	N/A
IBB	Akramuzzaman	617	0.3	N/A
BCP	Md. Nazmul Hasan	257	0.1	N/A
Majority		32,389	15.1	N/A
Turnout		214,916	64.7	N/A
BNP gain from AL				

=== Elections in the 2010s ===
Syeda Sajeda Chowdhury was elected unopposed in the 2014 general election after opposition parties withdrew their candidacies in a boycott of the election.

=== Elections in the 2000s ===
General Election 2008: Faridpur-2
Party	Candidate	Votes	%	±%
AL	Syeda Sajeda Chowdhury	116,498	60.5	+14.6
BNP	Shama Obaed	75,726	39.3	−14.0
CPB	Md. Rafiquzzaman Mia	377	0.2	N/A
Majority		40,772	21.2	+13.8
Turnout		192,601	89.0	+10.0
AL gain from BNP				

General Election 2001: Faridpur-2
Party	Candidate	Votes	%	±%
BNP	KM Obaidur Rahman	86,450	53.3	+7.1
AL	Syeda Sajeda Chowdhury	74,474	45.9	+0.2
IJOF	Saifuzzaman Chowdhury Jewel	959	0.6	N/A
Jatiya Party (M)	Md. Joinal Abedin	194	0.1	N/A
Independent	Syed Tanvir Hossain	170	0.1	N/A
Majority		11,976	7.4	+6.9
Turnout		162,247	79.0	+2.2
BNP hold				

=== Elections in the 1990s ===
General Election June 1996: Faridpur-2
Party	Candidate	Votes	%	±%
BNP	KM Obaidur Rahman	55,118	46.2	+38.3
AL	Syeda Sajeda Chowdhury	54,572	45.7	+7.4
Zaker Party	Md. Atiar Rahman	4,425	3.7	−8.1
JP(E)	Saifuzzaman Chowdhury Jewel	2,323	1.9	+1.5
Jamaat	Md. Golam Rasul Miah	1,909	1.6	N/A
BKA	Abdul Mannan	458	0.4	N/A
CPB	Mir Abu Bakar Siddique	283	0.2	N/A
Jatiya Janata Party (Nurul Islam)	Azam Amir Ali	278	0.2	N/A
Majority		546	0.5	−2.6
Turnout		119,366	76.8	+20.2
BNP gain from AL				

General Election 1991: Faridpur-2
Party	Candidate	Votes	%	±%
AL	Syeda Sajeda Chowdhury	37,229	38.3	
Bangladesh Janata Party	KM Obaidur Rahman	34,210	35.2	
Zaker Party	A. K. M. Khairuzzaman	11,450	11.8	
BNP	Abul Hossein Miah	7,630	7.9	
BKA	Abdul Hai Azad	4,779	4.9	
JSD	Abu Sayeed Khan	873	0.9	
Jatiya Ganatantrik Party	Shah Md. Kazi Kobirul Islam Kanchan	589	0.6	
JP(E)	Saifuzzaman Chowdhury Jewel	355	0.4	
Majority		3,019	3.1	
Turnout		97,115	56.6	
AL gain from JP(E)				
