= David Goodrich =

David Goodrich is an American author and retired climate scientist. He is the former director of the Global Climate Observing System at the United Nations World Meteorological Organization in Geneva, Switzerland. He also directed the multi-agency U.S. Global Change Research Program in Washington, D.C., and worked as the head of the Climate Observations and Monitoring Program at the U.S. National Oceanographic and Atmospheric Association (NOAA).

== Literary works ==
Goodrich is the author of two non-fiction books that combine the science of climate change with distance cycling travelogues. His first book, A Hole in the Wind (Pegasus Books, 2017), captures Goodrich's bicycle journey across the U.S. as he speaks with Americans from all political persuasions about climate change. This work was named a 2017 "Best Book" by Forbes and was the 2017 "Popular Choice" winner by the Atmospheric Science Librarians International. A Hole in the Wind was also the subject of extensive climate-change related news coverage, including in The Washington Post, Democracy Now!, and The Christian Science Monitor, among others. His second book, A Voyage Across an Ancient Ocean (Simon & Schuster, 2020), follows Goodrich as he cycles across the Western Interior Seaway, an expanse that runs from the Canadian prairies through the Badlands of the United States, and tracks the flow of oil North to South. Goodrich has also published a number of other short non-fiction and fiction works in The Humanist, Potomac Review, and National Geographic Traveler.

== Activism ==
Goodrich is the board chair for the Chesapeake Climate Action Network (CCAN), a nonprofit organization dedicated to fighting global warming in Maryland, Virginia, and Washington, D.C.
