= Roopa Farooki =

British writer

- Born: 1974 (age 51–52); Lahore, Pakistan
- Education: New College, Oxford
- Occupation: Writer
- Notable work: Bitter Sweets; Corner Shop; The Way Things Look to Me; Half Life; The Flying Man; The Good Children; The Cure for a Crime, A Double Detectives Medical Mystery; Diagnosis Danger, A Double Detectives Medical Mystery; Everything Is True, a junior doctor's story of life, death and grief in a time of pandemic
- Children: 4
- Parent(s): Nasim Ahmed Farooki; Nilofar Farooki
- Website: roopafarooki.com

Roopa Farooki is a British novelist and medical doctor. Born in Lahore, she lives between France and Great Britain. Her first novel, Bitter Sweets, was shortlisted for the 2007 Orange Award for New Writers.

== Early life and education ==
Farooki was born in Lahore, Pakistan, in 1974 to a Pakistani father and Bangladeshi mother, who moved to London when she was seven months old. Her father was the late Nasir Ahmad Farooki, a Pakistani novelist and a prominent figure in Pakistani literary circles in the 1960s. Roopa's father abandoned her when she was 13, later marrying a Chinese American. Her mother, Niluffer, later had a long term relationship with an English-Iraqi of Jewish descent. She had a sister, Kiron, who became a solicitor.

Despite being of both Pakistani and Bangladeshi descent, she speaks only English, because her parents were keen on assimilating into London and spoke to her in only English.

She won a scholarship to a private girls’ school, but on the condition she chose arts subjects at A-Level, which frustrated her ambition to become doctor.

Roopa studied PPE at New College, Oxford University, worked in corporate finance (at Arthur Andersen) and then as an advertising account director (at Saatchi & Saatchi and JWT), before she turned to writing fiction full-time.

Once her children were at school, she borrowed books on chemistry, biology and physics from a library, studied them for three to six months, and passed the graduate entry exam for medicine. In 2019, she completed a postgraduate degree in medicine from St George's, University of London, commencing work as a junior doctor in London and Kent.

== Novels ==
She wrote her first novel, Bitter Sweets, while pregnant with her first child, and renovating a house in SW France. Bitter Sweets was first published in the UK in 2007, and shortlisted for the Orange Award for New Writers that year. She published her second novel, Corner Shop, in 2008. Her third novel, The Way Things Look To Me, was published in 2009, and was voted one of The Times Top 50 Paperbacks of 2009, long-listed for the Orange Prize 2010, and has been long-listed for the Impac Dublin Literary Award 2011. Her fourth novel, Half Life, was published in 2010, and was selected by Entertainment Weekly (US) as No. 2 on their list of "Eighteen Books We Can't Wait to Read This Summer"; it was also nominated for the International Muslim Writers Awards 2011. Her fifth novel, The Flying Man was published in January 2012 in the UK, and has been longlisted for the Orange Prize 2012. Her sixth novel, The Good Children, was published in 2014, and was featured on BBC Radio Four Open Book. She has said this might be her final novel. Farooki has also been nominated for the Women's Prize for Fiction three times.

Farooki's novels have been published in English internationally (in the US and Canada, UK, Australia, India, Singapore) and in translation in a dozen languages across Europe.

After graduating as a Doctor, Farooki has turned from literary fiction to children's fiction featuring female BAME protagonists, with The Double Detectives Medical Mystery series at Oxford University Press. The first book, The Cure for A Crime, was published in 2020. The second book, Diagnosis Danger, came out in 2021.

During the COVID-19 pandemic, she worked in an acute medical ward. Her memoir of the first 40 days of the pandemic as a junior doctor, following the loss of her sister Kiron to breast cancer, Everything is True: a Junior Doctor’s Story of Life, Death and Grief in a Time of Pandemic, was published by Bloomsbury in 2022, and headed the list of the Guardian's Book Highlights of 2022. This covered the pressures of her work and its difficult impact on her family, partly by imagined conversations with her late sister. She said she found the weekly clap for the NHS to be a performative, futile gesture. She continues to work full time as an NHS doctor, specialised in Internal Medicine, alongside her writing and lecturing.

== Personal life ==
Farooki cites her father as an inspiration, and has written frankly about her relationship with her father and his influence on her work in the UK national press. She has also written about her experiences of eczema, relationship counselling, and fertility treatment. Her recent novels have featured characters with Asperger's syndrome, and bipolar disorder.

Before her sister, Kiron, died of cancer, she had advised Roopa to separate from her husband; advice she did not take.

She currently lives in southwest France and southeast England with her husband and four children, twin girls, older daughter and son. She teaches creative writing, having been a lecturer on the Masters programme in Prose Fiction at Canterbury Christ Church University and an undergraduate lecturer at the University of Kent in England. She also teaches on the Masters programme at the University of Oxford, and is the ambassador for the UK relationship counselling charity, Relate.

== Acceptance ==
Farooki's novels have been critically well received, and she has been compared to other British female novelists, Andrea Levy, Zadie Smith, and Monica Ali. In an interview with the Metro in 2010, headlined, "Nationality is Not The Issue", she said she was flattered by the comparisons, but said that a key difference was that she had made a deliberate decision not to focus on cultural clash in her novels, and to write universal stories.
