= Md. Abdul Matin Mia =

Bangladeshi politician

- মোঃ আব্দুল মতিন মিয়া

Member of Bangladesh Parliament
- In office 1979–1986
- Preceded by: Khandaker Nurul Islam
- Succeeded by: Mohammad AAM Khairuzzaman Mia

Personal details
- Born: Bahadurpur, Pangsha Upazila, Bengal Presidency, British India
- Party: Jatiya Samajtantrik Dal

Md. Abdul Matin Mia is a Jatiya Samajtantrik Dal politician and a former member of parliament for Faridpur-2.

== Career ==
Mia was elected to parliament from Faridpur-2 as a Jatiya Samajtantrik Dal candidate in 1979.
