= Tabetha Kanengoni-Malinga =

Zimbabwean businesswoman and politician

Minister of State in the Office of the Vice-President of Zimbabwe
- In office 2015 – August 2018
- President: Robert Mugabe; Emmerson Mnangagwa
- Vice President: Phelekezela Mphoko

Deputy Minister of Sports, Arts and Culture of Zimbabwe
- In office September 2013 – 2015
- President: Robert Mugabe
- Minister: Andrew Langa
- Preceded by: Office created

Member of the National Assembly of Zimbabwe for Mazowe Central
- In office 2013–2018
- Preceded by: Shepherd Mushonga
- Succeeded by: Sydney Chidamba

Personal details
- Born: Tabetha Kanengoni; 23 August 1982 (age 44) Zimbabwe
- Party: ZANU–PF
- Spouse: Mpehlabayo Malinga
- Children: 4
- Education: University of Cape Town (BSocSc); University of Zimbabwe (MS)

Tabetha Kanengoni-Malinga (born 23 August 1982) is a Zimbabwean businesswoman and politician. She was the Minister of State in the Office of Second Vice-President of Zimbabwe Phelekezela Mphoko from 2015 to 2018. Previously, she served as Deputy Minister of Sports, Arts and Culture from 2013 to 2015. She was the Member of Parliament for Mazowe Central from 2013 to 2018. She is a member of ZANU–PF, and previously held leadership roles in the party's youth and women's leagues.

== Early life and education ==
Kanengoni-Malinga was born on 23 August 1982. Her father Elias Kanengoni, who died in 2013, is a former deputy director of the Central Intelligence Organisation. She completed her O Levels and A Levels at Girls High School in Harare. After graduating, she briefly went to the United States on a basketball scholarship. She has also played for the Zimbabwe women's national basketball team.

She attended the University of Cape Town in South Africa, graduating with a Bachelor of Social Science in Politics and Gender Studies. She pursued a master's degree in strategic management from Chinhoyi University of Technology, ultimately graduating with a Master of Science in International Relations from the University of Zimbabwe in 2016.

== Political career ==
Kanengoni-Malinga first entered Zimbabwean politics after graduating from the University of Cape Town. She was elected to the ZANU–PF Provincial Youth Executive in Mashonaland Central Province in 2008, and was voted secretary for gender and culture for the party's National Youth Executive the following year. She was then elected deputy secretary for health and child care, also in the National Youth Executive. In 2014, she switched over from the Youth League to the Women's League, where she became secretary for external relations under Grace Mugabe.

In the 2013 general election, Kanengoni-Malinga ran as the ZANU–PF candidate for the National Assembly constituency of Mazowe Central. She won with 10,823 votes (70%) against Shepherd Mushonga of the MDC–T and Zivanayi Chiweshe of the MDC–N, who received 3,998 and 656 votes respectively. After her election to Parliament, she was included in President Robert Mugabe's cabinet as the Deputy Minister of Sports, Arts and Culture under Minister Andrew Langa. The ministry was newly created, its portfolios having previously been the responsibility of the Ministry of Education. She was 31 at the time, making her one of the youngest members of parliament and the cabinet. As deputy minister, she was known for taking on corruption in the Zimbabwe Football Association (ZIFA). She organized a committee to investigation corruption within ZIFA, which revealed mismanagement and theft of funds by the association's leaders.

In 2015, Kanengoni-Malinga was appointed Minister of State in the Office of the Vice-President of Zimbabwe, and was assigned to Second Vice-President Phelekezela Mphoko. Her duties included managing the tasks assigned by President Mugabe to Vice-President Mphoko, and making sure the ministries the vice-president oversees were carrying out their roles effectively.

Kanengoni-Malinga describes herself as a "pan-Africanist, with a little liberal feminism, but certainly not a radical." She describes herself as "driven" by two agendas: female empowerment and "upholding the national flag wherever I go."

== Business career ==
Kanengoni-Malinga and her husband own several businesses in addition to their careers in politics. She owns a soybean farm in Mazowe that employs over 100 people, while her husband owns a mine in Filabusi and manages his father's company, Jabulani Safaris.

== Personal life ==
Kanengoni-Malinga is married to Mpehlabayo Joshua Malinga, the son of former Mayor of Bulawayo and ZANU–PF Politburo member Joshua Malinga. Kanengoni-Malinga is from Mashonaland Central Province and her husband is from Bulawayo; they met at a ZANU–PF party conference in the capital, Harare. Her husband is also involved in politics, having served as secretary of external affairs in the party's Youth League. The couple has four daughters—Nandipha, Unathi, Mbali, and Thando—and resides in Borrowdale, an affluent suburb of Harare. She enjoys traveling, cooking, visiting friends, watching DStv, and following basketball.
