= KM Obaidur Rahman =

Bangladeshi politician

Khandakar Mohammad Obaidur Rahman
- খন্দকার মোহাম্মদ ওবায়দুর রহমান

4th General Secretary of Bangladesh Nationalist Party
- In office 1986–1988
- Chaiperson: Khaleda Zia
- Preceded by: Mustafizur Rahman
- Succeeded by: Abdus Salam Talukder

Personal details
- Born: 5 May 1940 Nagarkanda, Bengal, British India
- Died: 21 March 2007 (aged 66) Dhaka, Bangladesh
- Children: Shama Obaed
- Parent: Khandakar Md. Atiqur Rahman (father)
- Education: University of Dhaka (MA)

Khandakar Mohammad Obaidur Rahman (5 May 1940 – 21 March 2007) was a Bangladeshi politician. He was a member of the Jatiya Sangsad in 1973 representing Bangladesh Awami League and in 1979, 1996 and 2001 representing the Bangladesh Nationalist Party (BNP).

== Early life ==
Khandakar Mohammad Obaidur Rahman was born into a Bengali Muslim family of Khandakars on 5 May 1940 at Laskardia, Nagarkanda Upazila, Faridpur District, East Bengal, British Raj. His father was Khandakar Mohammad Atiqur Rahman. He earned his MA degree in 1964 from the University of Dhaka.

== Career ==
Obaidur Rahman was elected as general secretary of Dhaka University Central Students Union (DUCSU) during 1962–63. In 1963 he was elected President of East Pakistan Students League. He supported the 1966 Six Point movement of Awami League and participated in the 1969 Mass uprising in East Pakistan. He joined Bangladesh Awami League in 1964 and had served as the social welfare secretary during 1966–1971. In 1970 he was elected to the National Assembly of Pakistan. He worked with the Non-cooperation movement and was the convener of the Co-ordination and Resistance Committee in Faridpur District. After the start of Bangladesh Liberation war he moved to India and worked in the Purulia Freedom Fighters Training Camp as the "political motivator". He temporarily administered the Awami League office in Kolkata.

In 1973, Obaidur Rahman was elected a member of the first Jatiya Sangsad. He served as the deputy minister in charge of Post and Telegraph from 1973 to 1975. After the assassination of Sheikh Mujibur Rahman, President of Bangladesh, he joined with Khondokar Moshtaque Ahmed. He was an accused in the 1975 Jail Killing case in which four national leaders of Bangladesh Awami League were killed. Obaidur Rahman joined the Bangladesh Nationalist Party (BNP) in 1978. He was elected to parliament as a candidate of Bangladesh Nationalist Party. He was a member of the cabinet in charge of the Ministry of Fishery and Livestock and later of the Ministry of Aviation and Tourism. From 1986 to 1988 he served as the General Secretary of Bangladesh Nationalist Party. He was elected to parliament in 1996 and in 2001. He was acquitted in the Jail Killing case in 2004. He formed the Janata Party in the 1980s with a ship as its symbol.

== Personal life ==
Obaidur Rahman was married to Professor Shaheda Obaid, who had a daughter named, Shama Obaed. Obaidur Rahman became her adopted father. On 18 March 2008 Shahida Obaid was sued by Bangladesh Anti Corruption Commission on graft allegation relating to her chairmanship of Board of Intermediate and Secondary Education, Dhaka. Shama Obaed contested the Faridpur-2 parliamentary election in 2008 as a Bangladesh Nationalist Party candidate. Shama is the Organizing Secretary of Bangladesh Nationalist Party.

== Death and legacy ==
Obaidur Rahman died on 21 March 2007 in Apollo Hospital, Dhaka, Bangladesh. He was buried in Laskardia, Nagarkanda Upazila, Faridpur District. Obaidur Rahman Smriti Sangsad and KM Obaidur Rahman Foundation are two organisations dedicated to his memory.
