= Van G. Garrett =

American poet

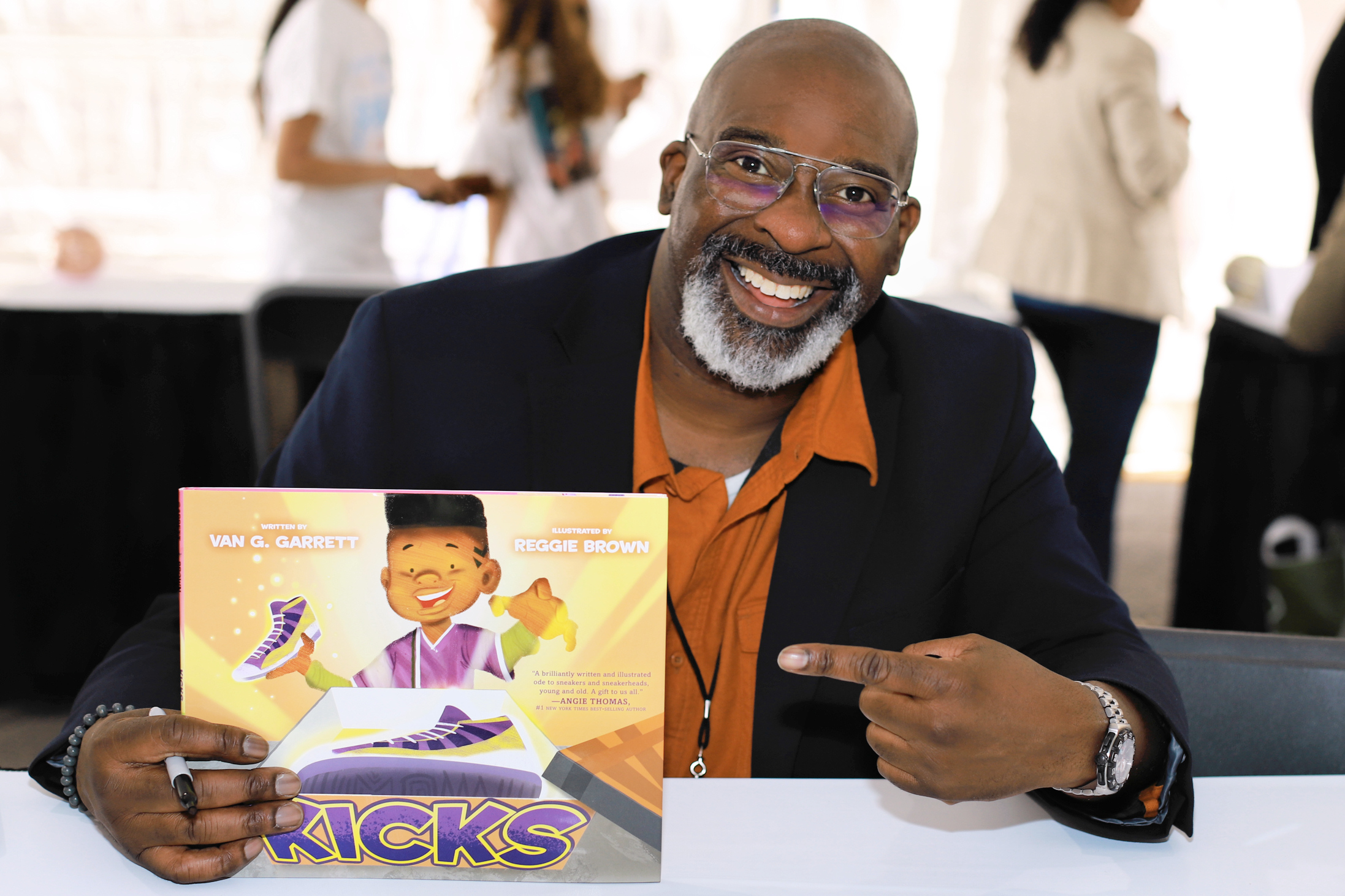
- Garrett at the 2022 Texas Book Festival.
- Born: Wharton, Texas, United States
- Education: Houston Baptist University (B.A.); University of Houston-Victoria (M.A.)
- Occupations: Poet; novelist; photographer; teacher; professor
- Writing career
- Pen name: Fui Koshi; Gee Van Garrett
- Language: English
- Years active: 1999–present
- Genres: Poetry, Young Adult
- Website: www.vanggarrettpoet.com

Van G. Garrett is an American poet, novelist, teacher, and photographer. Garrett's poetry has appeared in a number of well-known American literary journals, including: African American Review; The Amistad; ChickenBones; Drumvoices Revue; Obsidian III; phati'tude Literary Magazine; Pittsburgh Quarterly; Potomac Review; and StepAway Magazine. His works have also been published internationally, including in: Istanbul Literature Review (Turkey); One Ghana, One Voice; Poems Niederngasse (Switzerland); and White Chimney (UK). Garrett often writes poetry with haiku or kwansaba structures.

== Early life and college ==
Van Garrett was born in Wharton, Texas. In 1999, he graduated from Houston Baptist University with a Bachelor of Arts in Mass Media and English. In 2002 and again in 2004, Garrett was awarded a Callaloo Creative Writing Fellowship for poetry. In 2006, he received a Master of Arts in Interdisciplinary Studies from the University of Houston–Victoria. Garrett continues to support an interdisciplinary approach through his focus on ekphrastic interpretation of art. In 2006, Garrett also received a Hurston/Wright Fellowship at American University. Garrett was a reading clinician at the Texas Reading Institute. He also worked at the Center for Academic and Research Skills (CARS) at the University of Texas-Houston Health Science Center.

== International study and workshops ==
Upon being awarded the Dr. Kwame Nkrumah International Study Scholarship in 2008, Van G. Garrett studied African American Sociolinguistics and African Philosophy at the University of Ghana. He traveled within Ghana, teaching and reading poetry, and practicing photography. Also in 2008, Garrett's first book of poetry was published. He was a Book-in-a-Day (BID) Fellow in 2010, participating in workshops and cultural fairs in Tuscany. In conjunction with the Writers In The Schools (WITS) program, in 2011 Garrett served as a writer-in-residence in Latvia, teaching creative writing and reading poetry at a White Night festival.

== Current focus ==
Van G. Garrett has led creative writing workshops at the Museum of Fine Arts, Houston, and the Contemporary Arts Museum Houston. His visual art has been exhibited by or displayed at the Museum of Fine Arts Houston, University of Rhode Island, and Rice University, and Aurora Picture Show. Garrett has received a Poets & Writers grant, participating in its Readings & Workshops program and has judged National Poetry Slam and ARTlines Poetry Competition events.

In 2015, Garrett collaborated with Don Tate to create a poetry curriculum guide for grades K-5 that aligns with the Texas Essential Knowledge and Skills standards. The Texas Association of Authors awarded the 2017 Best Book of African American Poetry award to Garrett's work, 49: Wings and Prayers.

Van G. Garrett is an adjunct instructor of African American Studies and Literature at the University of Houston. He is also a teacher at Lanier Middle School.

== See also ==
- History of African Americans in Houston

== Works ==
- Smith McKoy, Sheila, ed. (2006). "Kwansabas for Jay Wright". Obsidian III. 7 (2). North Carolina State University: 77. See "Jay Wright" article.
- Abdurrahman, Abdul Ali, ed. (2006). "island kwansabas #1" (PDF). The Amistad (fall). Howard University: 18. Also "miles is cool as hell" at page 19.
- Songs in Blue Negritude. New Orleans, LA: Xavier Review Press. February 1, 2008. ISBN 9781883275181. OCLC 724650541.
- Entzminger, Betine, ed. (2010). "frederick (baily) douglass kwansaba - a poem" (PDF). Making Connections, Interdisciplinary Approaches to Cultural Diversity — Interdisciplinary Perspectives on Frederick Douglass. 12 (1). Bloomsburg, PA: Bloomsburg University: 16. ISSN 1930-1987.
- ZURI: Selected Love Songs. Cap & Sneakers Studios LLC. August 1, 2011. ASIN B005FLU3YC.
- "Gingerbread and Bluegrass". Poetry. Potomac Review (49). Rockville, MD: Montgomery College. 2011.
- Iron Legs In The Trees. Long Island City, NY: Seaburn Books. January 15, 2013. ISBN 9781592323784.
- Carlaw, Darren Richard, ed. (2013). "Walking: Postcard From The Ghetto Part 2". StepAway Magazine (9). Newcastle upon Tyne, UK.
- "Change Kwansabas 1 and 5" (PDF), A Change is Gonna Come, Augusta Savage Gallery: University of Massachusetts Amherst, pp. 31–32, 2015
- 49: Wings & Prayers. Somerville, MA: Kattywompus Press. 20 Feb 2016. ISBN 9781944252021. OCLC 1003209994.
- Lennox in Twelve: Poems. 45 Alternate Press. 4 Jul 2017. ASIN B073HBD3SZ.
- HOG: Poems. 45 Alternate Press. 18 Jul 2017. ASIN B073WGX1X6.
- Water Bodies. Otis Books. December 2019. ISBN 9980243031.
- Specs. Versify. August 2025. ISBN 978-0358141822

== Other sources ==
- Wharton Journal-Spectator, National Black History Month Feature, February 16, 2011
