= Maryam Sullivan =

American dramatist

Maryam "Umm Juwayriyah" Sullivan
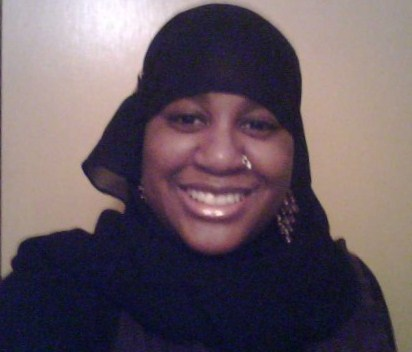
- Maryam "Umm Juwayriyah" Sullivan
- Occupations: novelist, playwright, poet, performer
- Writing career
- Genre: Urban Islamic literature
- Notable work: The Size of A Mustard Seed
- Website: www.authorummjuwayriyah.com

Maryam “Umm Juwayriyah” Sullivan is an American poet, novelist, playwright, journalist and performance artist. Sullivan's novel The Size of a Mustard Seed is the first published Islamic Urban fiction title.

== Life ==
Umm Juwayriyah is an American Muslim of West Indian and American ancestry. She has three children and is a full-time elementary school teacher. In addition to writing, performing, and teaching, Umm Juwayriyah is editor for the New England Muslim Women's Association and former two-term assistant director of the Islamic Writers Alliance.

== Work ==
Umm Juwayriyah's began publishing her work at fourteen years old as the founder and a contributor to the newsletter and e-zine Adhaanul Mu’minaat. She has been published in print magazines such as Al Jumuah, Azizah, SISTERS, An Nisaa, and as well is published on several internet sites and other e-zines. Umm Juwayriyah's debut Islamic fiction novel The Size of a Mustard Seed is the first Islamic Urban fiction title.

Umm Juwayriyah has been performing her poetry and plays since she was 17. She has performed at the Islamic Circle of North America Convention (ICNA), New England Muslim Sisters Association (NEMSA), RETREAT, Muslimah Fit Retreat, the New Haven Masjid Al Islam's Youth Retreat, and numerous American colleges, including American International College and Amherst College. She has presented workshops at Rochester Institute of Technology, Al Iqra Academy, and at many Islamic Centers in New England. Her first staged play In The Shadows of Our Mothers debuted in 2003. Hijab All Mine opened in 2010 in New Haven, Connecticut. Umm Juwayriyah also speaks to Muslim and non-Muslim groups across the United States addressing issues, such as Muslims and media, Muslims in print, the state of Muslim youth in the West, and growing up Muslim in America.

== Awards ==
- 2010 WGGB/ Springfield Partners for Community Action Activism Award
- 2009 Lorraine Hansberry's Performing Arts Scholarship
- 2006 Canada's An Nisaa's Muslim Fiction Writer of The Year Award

== Selected published works ==
- The Size of a Mustard Seed (Muslim Writers Publishing, 2009) ISBN 0-9767861-4-1 ISBN 978-0-97678-614-6
- Many Voices, One Faith II – Islamic Fiction Stories (Muslim Writers Publishing, 2009) ISBN 0-9819770-1-4 ISBN 978-098197-701-0
- Many Poetic Voices, One Faith (Muslim Writers Publishing, 2009) ISBN 0-9819770-0-6 ISBN 978-098197-700-3
- Many Voices, One Faith (Heliographica Press, 2005) ISBN 1-933037-47-4 ISBN 978-193303-747-9
