= Nimah Ismail Nawwab =

Saudi Arabian poet

- نعمة إسماعيل نواب
- Born: Malaysia
- Occupations: Poet, photographer, activist
- Notable work: The Unfurling, Canvas of the Soul

Nimah Ismail Nawwab is a Saudi Arabian poet, activist, photographer and writer.

== Biography ==
Nimah Ismail Nawwab was born in Malaysia and is of Saudi Arabian descent. She comes from a line of Meccan scholars. Her father is Ismail I. Nawwab, a former professor of linguistics at the University of Edinburgh. Nawwab grew up speaking three languages and her father read the Quran, Arabic poetry, and the plays of William Shakespeare to her. She previously worked at Aramco.

She was inspired to write poetry after meeting Naomi Shihab Nye. Her first internationally published poem was on the murder of Palestinian child Muhammad al-Durrah. Her earliest poetry focused on issues in Palestine and Iraq. Nawwab writes in English and her poetry discusses youth issues, women's issues, sexism, religion, and Saudi culture and society.

Her second book Canvas of the Soul: Mystic Poems from the Heartland of Arabia, is inspired by Sufism and features spiritual themes. Her work has also been featured in Gathering the Tide: An Anthology of Contemporary Arabian Gulf Poetry.

Her photography has been featured in Aramco World and Theodore Friend's book Woman, Man, and God in Modern Islam. Nawwab is the first Saudi woman poet to be published in the United States. She is also the first Saudi poet to publicly sign their work.

== Works ==
=== Books ===
- The Unfurling (2004, Selwa Press)
- Canvas of the Soul: Mystic Poems from the Heartland of Arabia (2012, Tughra Books)

=== Selections ===
- Gathering the Tide: An Anthology of Contemporary Arabian Gulf Poetry (Ithaca Press, 2011)
