= The Zakat Foundation =

American non-profit organization

Zakat Foundation of America
- Founded: 2001
- Founder: Halil Demir
- Type: 501(c)(3)
- Purpose: Sustainable Development, Education, Health and Nutrition, Orphans and Child Welfare, Water and Sanitation, Emergency Relief and Disaster Preparedness
- Location: Bridgeview, Illinois
- Origins: Chicago, Illinois, US
- Region served: Worldwide
- Revenue: $8,521,089 (2015)
- Website: www.zakat.org

Zakat Foundation of America is a Chicago-based NGO providing emergency relief, post-disaster rehabilitation, sustainable development, education, healthcare, orphan sponsorship, and seasonal programs such as Ramadan iftars and Udhiya/Qurbani. Zakat Foundation of America is registered under 501(c)(3) as a non-profit charity organization.

== Programs ==
Emergency Relief – Zakat Foundation of America responds to natural and man-made humanitarian crises around the world. The charity focuses on providing both short-term and long-term emergency relief for vulnerable people. Notably, it was among the first to respond to the earthquakes that struck Turkey and Syria in February 2023.

Historically, Zakat Foundation of America has been providing emergency relief for more than two decades. In 2003, the charity aided 7,000 Iraq war victims. In 2005, the nonprofit worked with the Federal Emergency Management Agency (FEMA) to respond to Hurricane Katrina in Louisiana. Zakat Foundation of America opened a temporary office in the state to respond. In 2011, it began a years-long response to the crisis in Syria. In 2017, the charity provided aid in Texas to Hurricane Harvey victims, in Puerto Rico to Hurricane Maria victims, and was among the first responders in Bangladesh to the Rohingya refugee crisis. In 2020, it distributed more than 2 million pounds of fresh produce, meat and dairy products in the United States alone in COVID-19 relief, in addition to hygiene kits and personal protective equipment in the U.S. and in dozens of countries. Zakat Foundation of America has an ongoing presence in Syria and the surrounding countries, delivering food, medicine and temporary housing to Syrian IDPs and refugees.[4] They delivered over $2 million in aid to Syrian Internally Displaced Persons (IDPs) and refugees in 2015.

Education – In the Turkish city of Gaziantep, Zakat Foundation of America sponsors four schools with 1,800 students and 70 staff members, as well as Zahra University, which hosts 300 students and is one of the first institutions of higher education dedicated to Syrian refugees. In Kenya, Zakat Foundation of America partners with Heshima Kenya to educate refugee girls and young women, while in Afghanistan, Zakat Foundation of America works towards providing young women with educational opportunities with schools in Kabul and Wardak Province.

Development – In Ghana, Zakat Foundation of America supported the establishment of women's agricultural collectives that boost local agriculture and food security while stabilizing families and communities by giving women steady employment. [6] In both Jordan and Bangladesh, they sponsor women's Vocational Training Centers such as knitting and sewing, which in turn provide a steady source of income.

Health Care - Zakat Foundation of America and its partners support community health and nutrition education initiatives using local resources. To address the overwhelming need for doctors and health care in Kenya, mobile clinics open throughout the country for a few weeks at a time, making well visits, immunizations, simple medical treatment and doctor referrals accessible to more than 2,700 people every year. In Palestine, they provided $2.7 million in medical aid since 2015, in Mali, they sponsored six medical facilities with essential supplies, and also offered medical benefits to over 8,000 individuals through sponsored clinics.

Ramadan – During Ramadan in 2015 they served 600,000+ beneficiaries in over 35 countries with fresh, hot iftar meals for disadvantaged communities and also gave Eid al-Fitr gifts such as toys, backpacks and new outfits to poor and refugee children.

Udhiya / Qurbani – During Udhiya of 2015 they distributed meat from freshly sacrificed livestock to over 33,000 families across the world.

Sadaqa Jariyah – This concept of "perpetual charity" translates into long-term development and the construction of mosques, schools, water wells and other resources that benefit a community long after the initial outlay of funds. In 2015, water wells and handpumps were installed in communities at risk from water scarcity to benefit close to 3 million people worldwide.

Winter Kits – More than 23,000 kits were distributed in 14 countries around the world in 2015, providing coats, jackets, shawls, hats, gloves, scarves, and boots.

Aqeeqah – In 2015, 15,000 beneficiaries celebrated the birth of a child through aqeeqah (religious celebration of a child birth), receiving 300 shares of high-quality livestock whose meat was distributed in Ghana, Mali, and Bangladesh.

Orphan Care: Zakat Foundation of America established its orphan sponsorship program in 2002. Zakat Foundation of America has supported more than 634,000 orphans in 15 countries. The sponsorship provides food, education, hygiene, health care and other urgent aid to the sponsored child.

In 2004, it opened two orphanages in Pakistan. In 2016, it opened the Muhammad Ali Safe House in Gaziantep, Turkey, for orphans and guardians.

It won the 2022 Platinum Hermes Awards for the #ChooseWithLove orphan sponsorship rebranding campaign and was featured in FORBES Magazine for innovative human-centric approach. The campaign “reimagines” orphan sponsorship; it removed photos from the orphan selection process to eliminate colorism and age bias, as Zakat Foundation of America noticed children in its program were not being sponsored as quickly because of their skin tone, gender and age.

== Countries served ==
Zakat Foundation of America operates in 30 countries through its offices in Africa, Asia and the Middle East.

- Afghanistan
- Burkina Faso
- China
- Georgia
- Indonesia
- Kosovo
- Mauritania
- Sudan
- Thailand
- Azerbaijan
- Burma
- Egypt
- Ghana
- Iran
- Lebanon
- Niger
- Somalia
- Syria
- Turkey
- Bangladesh
- Chechnya
- Ethiopia
- Haiti
- Iraq
- Mali
- Pakistan
- Sri Lanka
- Tajikistan
- United States

== Awards ==
In 2011, 2012, 2013, 2014, 2015 and 2016 Zakat Foundation of America was awarded Charity Navigator's highest four star rating indicating that Zakat Foundation of America has demonstrated exceptional financial health, accountability and transparency.

Zakat Foundation of America is listed as a top-rated charity by Great Nonprofits.

== Publications ==
- The Zakat Handbook: A Practical Guide for Muslims in the West offers a comprehensive guide to the obligatory pillar of Islam to better understand the concepts, principles and calculation of Zakat.
- 9 Myths About Muslim Charities a book that serves to dispel myths about Muslim American charities.
