= Kaykobad =

Bengali Poet

Mohakobi Munshi Kaykobad
- কায়কোবাদ
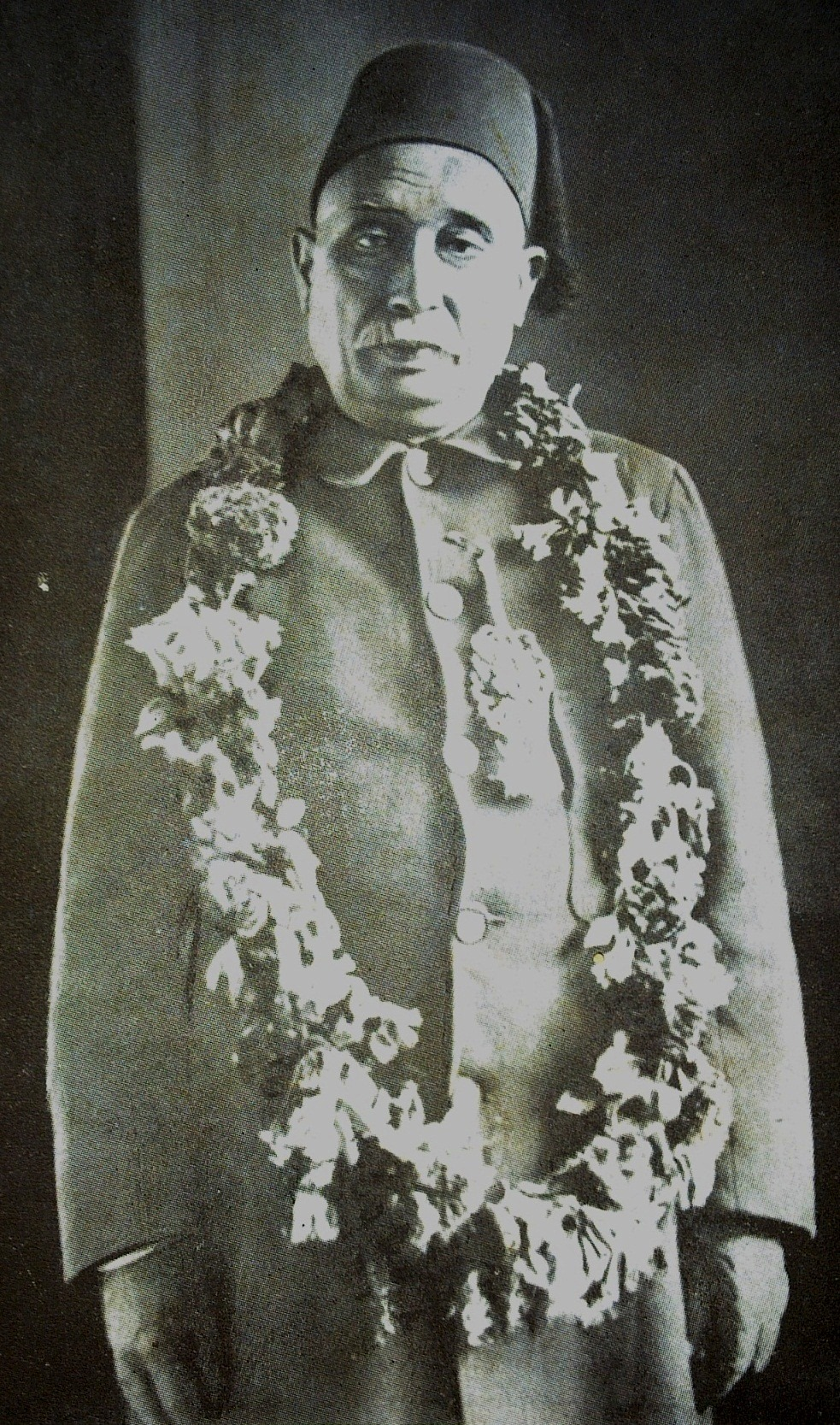
- Kaykobad in 1932
- Born: Mohammad Kazem Al-Qureshi; 1857; Nawabganj, Bengal, British India
- Died: 21 July 1951 (aged 93–94); Dacca, East Bengal, Pakistan
- Resting place: Azimpur Graveyard, Dhaka
- Occupations: Poet; writer
- Relatives: Fazle Kaderi Mohammad Abdul Munim (nephew)
- Writing career
- Language: Bengali
- Notable work: Mahashmashan

Mohammad Kazem Al-Qureshi (Bengali: মোহাম্মদ কাজেম আল কোরেশী; c. 1857 – 21 July 1951), known by his pen-name Kaykobad (Bengali: কায়কোবাদ), was a Bengali poet. Nikhil Bharat Sahitya Sangha titled him "Kavyabhusan", "Vidyabhusan" and "Sahityaratna".

== Early life and education ==
Mohammad Kazem Al Qureshi was born in c. 1857 to a Bengali family of Iraqi Arab descent, tracing their lineage from the Quraysh tribe. He was born in his maternal family home situated in the Purba Para of Agla in Nawabganj, Dacca district, Bengal Presidency, as in tradition with other old Muslim families of Bengal. He was the son of Shahamatullah Al-Qureshi and Zarifunnesa Khatun. The Al-Qureshi family were based in the village of Gorail in Faridpur district. During the reign of Shah Jahan, his great great grandfather Hafizullah al-Qureshi migrated from Baghdad to Delhi and was appointed as the Imam of the Shahi Juma Masjid. This position passed down hereditarily until Kaykobad's grandfather Muhibbullah left India during the collapse of the Mughal Empire and settled in the village of Gorail. Kaykobad's father, Shahamatullah Al-Qureshi was a wakil at the Dacca District Judge Court. Kaykobad's maternal family were zamindars, known as the Chowdhuries of Alga. His maternal grandfather Chowdhury Muhammad Daulat was a descendant of Shahbaz Khan Kamboh, a military general of Emperor Akbar the Great. Kaykobad was eldest of his siblings. His younger brothers were civil surgeon Muhammad Abdul Bari Al-Qureshi and deputy magistrate Muhammad Abdul Khaliq Al-Qureshi. His younger sister Azizunnesa Khatun was the wife of a leading mukhtar of Bikrampur.

Kaykobad attended Pogose School and St Gregory's School. He then went to Dhaka Madrasah and left the madrasah before the Entrance Examination without attending the examination.

== Career ==
Kaykobad's poem "Birahabilap" was published in 1870, when he was about 13. He is most notable for the long narrative poem Mahashmashan. The poem narrates the story of the Third Battle of Panipat of 1761 and the defeat of the Marathas to Ahmed Shah Abdali. The poem was inspired by poet Nabinchandra Sen's "Palashir Juddha". His other notable works are "Kusumkanan", "Asrumala", "Shibmandir", "Maharram Sharif", "Gitikavya" and "Azan"

== Personal life ==
Kaykobad married Taherunnesa Khatun, the eldest daughter of his maternal uncle Chowdhury Hedayet Ali.

== Death ==
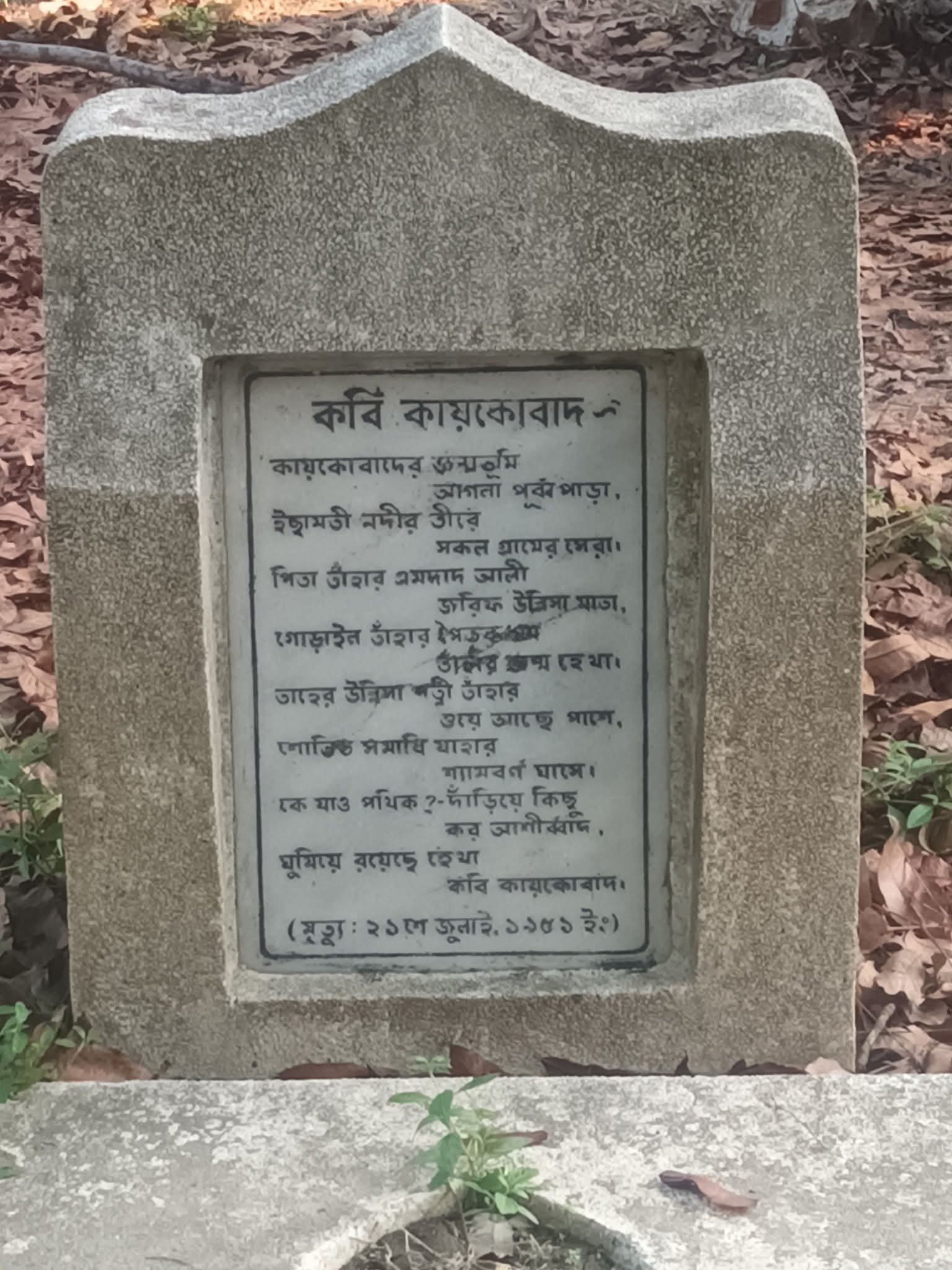
Epitaph of Poet Kaykobad in the Azimpur Graveyard

Kaykobad died of bronchopneumonia at Dhaka Medical College Hospital on 21 July 1951.
