= Wael Abdelgawad =

American novelist (born 1965)

Wael Abdelgawad (Arabic: وائل عبد الجواد; born May 2, 1965) is an American-born novelist, web developer and martial artist, best known for founding one of the first online Muslim matchmaking services, and for his fictional portrayals of American Muslims. As a columnist for the multi-author blog MuslimMatters.org, he has published a series of online novels that could be best characterized as Muslim adventure fiction.

Abdelgawad is the founder of Zawaj.com, an online Muslim matrimonial service founded in 1998. In 2010, his blog IslamicSunrays.com was nominated for a Brass Crescent award.

== Background ==
Wael Abdelgawad's parents were both Egyptian-American scientists who immigrated to the US in 1964. Wael grew up in California, attended junior high school in Libya, and high school in Saudi Arabia. He studied English literature at California State University Fresno as well as Fresno City College. Since 1998 he has been working as a webmaster and writer, and is a staff writer for MuslimMatters.org.

Abdelgawad resides in Fresno, California.

== Martial arts ==
Abdelgawad began his study of martial arts with Shotokan Karate at the age of 14, according to his martial arts biography, and continued his studies with arts such as HwaRangDo, Hapkido, Pekiti-Tirsia Kali, Silat, Shorin-Ryu, Kokodo Jujutsu, Jeet Kune Do and Aikido. He holds multiple black belt ranks. In 2013 he founded his own style, Hammerhead Hapkido, which incorporates techniques from Silat, and focuses on close quarters fighting and transitions from strikes to joint techniques, as well as knife defense.

== Appearances ==
Abdelgawad was a featured speaker at the annual ICNA-MAS convention held in Baltimore, Maryland in April 2017, where he discussed the use of fiction in normalizing the American view of Islam and Muslims. He also spoke at the Islamic Society of North America's (ISNA) 54th annual convention in Chicago in June 2017. His Hammerhead Martial Arts Youtube channel indicates ongoing classes and occasional martial arts seminars.

== Personal life ==
Abdelgawad has one child, a daughter named Salma, born in 2006. He is married to Yajaira Maxiel Menco Dominguez, a Colombian attorney.
