= Potomac Review =

American literary journal

- Discipline: Literary journal
- Language: English
- Edited by: Albert Kapikian

Publication details
- History: 1994-present
- Publisher: Montgomery College (United States)
- Frequency: Biannual

Standard abbreviations
- ISO 4: Potom. Rev.

Indexing
- ISSN: 1073-1989

Links
- Journal homepage

Potomac Review is a bi-annual American literary journal based in Rockville, Maryland. It was launched by the Founding Editor Eli Flam in 1993, and publishes fiction, poetry, and nonfiction from established as well as emerging writers. As part of its theme, the Review focuses on "the human and physical terrain" of the American Mid-Atlantic region "or by writers and visual artists living in the region." Writers who have contributed to this journal include Amina Gautier, Seth Abramson, Ted Kooser, Jacob M. Appel, Lisa Ohlen Harris, Jayant Kashyap, Van G. Garrett, David Wagoner, Ned Balbo, Marge Piercy, Grace Cavalieri, John Rolfe Gardiner, and Margaret MacInnis.

Noted as having first been published on a "shoestring budget" in 1994, the Potomac Review is now funded by the Montgomery College Foundation and Paul Peck Humanities Institute. Over the years, the journal has been praised for having "vivid and evocative cover image[s]" and has been called "a joy". In his '2024 Literary Magazine Ranking for Nonfiction', Clifford Garstang placed the journal in the 96th position, and in the 130th position in the 2025 ranking. Over the years, Potomac Review has received more than a dozen notable citations in Best American Essays, Best American Short Stories, and The Pushcart Prize Anthology. In 2024, Richard Prins's "Because: An Etiology" and Mark Christhilf's "Overtures on Some Unanswered Questions" were reprinted in Best American Essays and Best Spiritual Literature respectively.
