= Shahdab Akbar Chowdhury =

Bangladeshi politician

- শাহদাব আকবর চৌধুরী
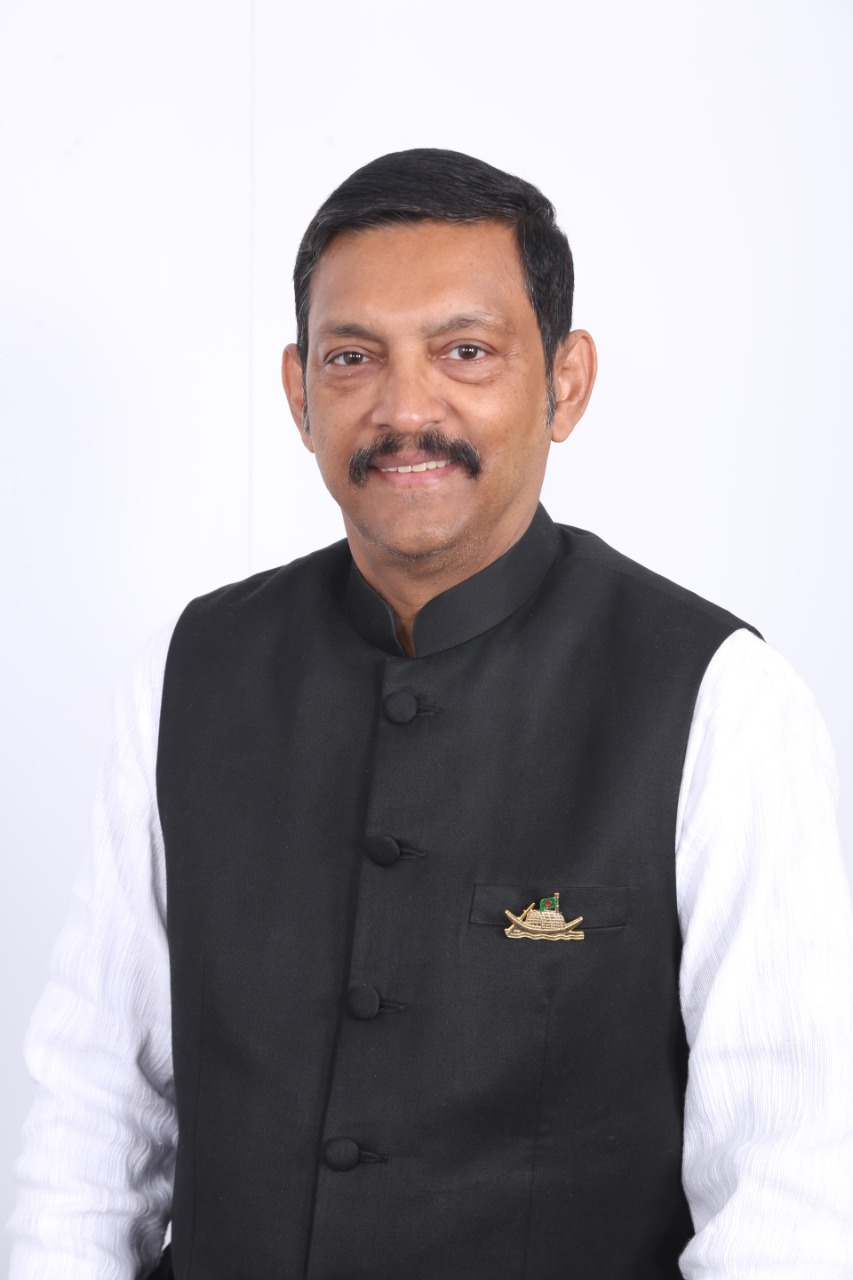

Member of the Bangladesh Parliament for Faridpur-2
- In office 15 November 2022 – 6 August 2024
- Preceded by: Syeda Sajeda Chowdhury

Personal details
- Born: 13 July 1962 (age 64)
- Party: Bangladesh Awami League
- Parents: Golam Akbar Chowdhury (father); Syeda Sajeda Chowdhury (mother)

Shahdab Akbar Chowdhury (born 13 July 1962) is a Bangladeshi politician and a former Jatiya Sangsad member representing the Faridpur-2 constituency elected at the 2022 by-polls. The seat became vacant when then incumbent, Syeda Sajeda Chowdhury, also his mother, died in office on 11 September 2022.

Shahdab Akbar Chowdhury is also known as Labu Chowdhury.

== Background ==
Shahdab was born to Golam Akbar Chowdhury (d. 2015) and Syeda Sajeda Chowdhury (d. 2022).

== Political career ==
At the bypoll election held on 5 November 2022, Chowdhury received 68,812 votes out of the 83,690, while his only opponent, Zainul Abedin Bakul Miah of Bangladesh Khilafat Andolan got 14,878.
