= Abul Hossain Mia =

Bangladesh Nationalist Party politician

- আবুল হোসেন মিয়া

Member of Bangladesh Parliament
- In office 15 February 1996 – 12 June 1996

Personal details
- Party: Bangladesh Nationalist Party

Abul Hossain Mia (Bengali: আবুল হোসেন মিয়া) is a Bangladesh Nationalist Party politician and a member of parliament for Faridpur-2.

== Career ==
Mia was elected to parliament from Faridpur-2 as a Bangladesh Nationalist Party candidate on 15 February 1996. He also contested in the 1991 election where his security deposit was confiscated due to lowest number of votes. He did not further contest in any other election.
