= Jamilah Kolocotronis =

- Born: Linda Kolocotronis
- Citizenship: United States
- Occupation: Writer
- Writing career
- Language: English
- Genre: Islamic fiction
- Notable work: Echoes

Linda "Jamilah" Kolocotronis was an American Muslim writer and former educator in American Islamic schools. Of Greek origin, she converted to Islam at the age of 23, and she published several Islamic fiction novels as well as her doctoral dissertation. Kolocotronis changed her first name to Jamilah when she became Muslim in 1980.

== Biography ==
After reading the Quran "looking for mistakes and inconsistencies" she found none and converted to Islam in July 1980 (Ramadan 19, 1400), and changed her name to Jamilah.

She died on Saturday, January 12, 2013.

== Books ==
Her first book, Islamic Jihad: An Historical Perspective, published in 1990, is her only non-fiction work. She was discussed in a book about female American converts to Islam, Daughters of Another Path. Her first Islamic fiction novel, Innocent People, was written after the September 11 attacks as a reaction to the proliferation of misinformation about Muslims in America. Themes of the book include anti-Muslim actions and sentiments targeted at the characters, as well as the emotional turmoil felt by individual Muslims who were being associated with the acts of the terrorist. Her subsequent novels explore other challenges routinely faced by Muslims in America, especially converts to Islam. Her Echoes Series was the second series of Islamic fiction novels to be written in English.

Her books include:

- Islamic Jihad: An Historical Perspective (American Trust Publications, 1990) ISBN 0-89259-086-6 ISBN 978-0-89259-086-5
- Innocent People (Leathers Publishing, 2003, paperback) ISBN 1-58597-209-6 ISBN 978-1-58597-209-8
- Echoes (Muslims Writers Publishing, 2006, paperback) ISBN 0-9767861-9-2 ISBN 978-0-9767861-9-1
- Rebounding (Muslim Writers Publishing, 2006, paperback) ISBN 0-9767861-3-3 ISBN 978-0-9767861-3-9
- Turbulence (Muslim Writers Publishing, 2007, paperback) ISBN 0-9793577-0-5 ISBN 978-0-9793577-0-1
- Ripples (Muslim Writers Publishing, 2008, paperback) ISBN 0-9793577-6-4 ISBN 978-0-9793577-6-3
- Silence (Muslim Writers Publishing, 2009, paperback) ISBN 0-9793577-9-9 ISBN 978-0-9793577-9-4
