= Sufiya Ahmed =

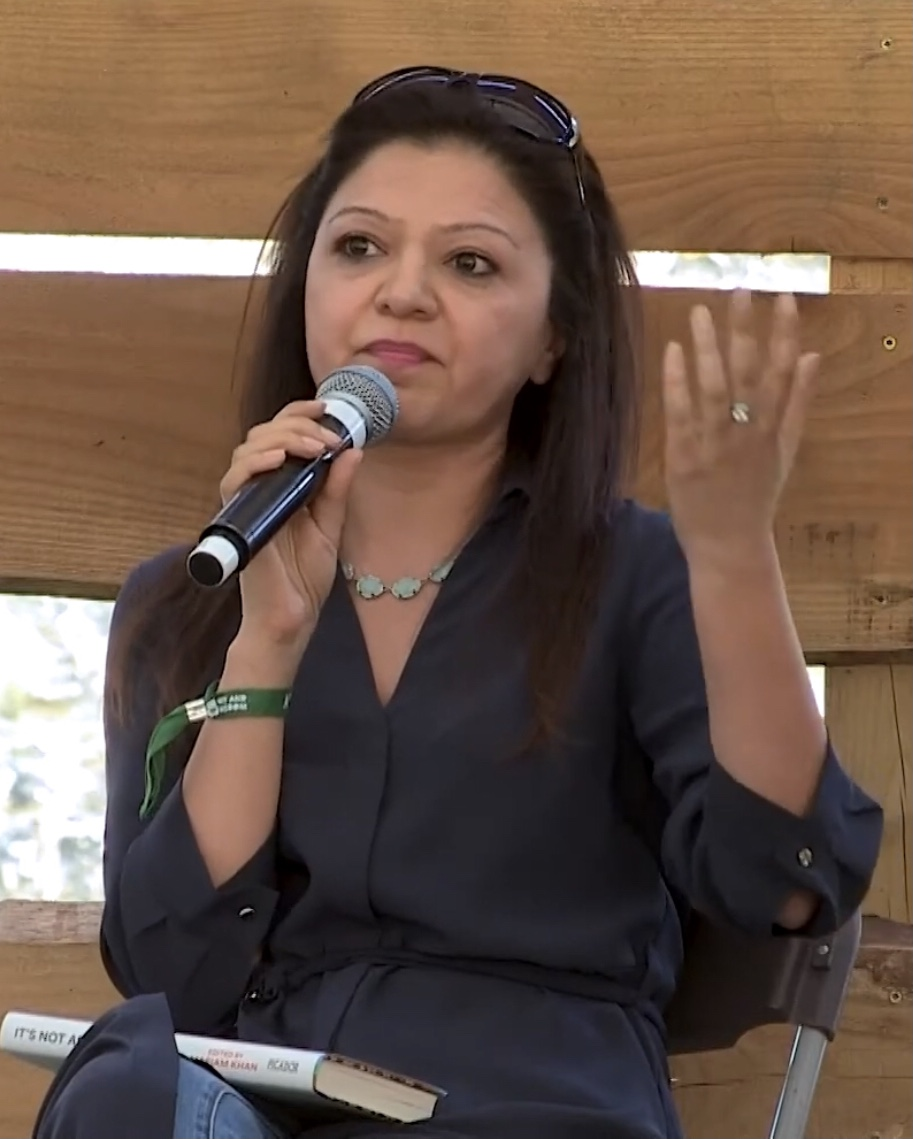
- Ahmed in 2020
- Born: Surat, India
- Years active: 2012–present

Sufiya Ahmed is a British author of children's literature. Her work includes the young adult (YA) novel Secrets of the Henna Girl (2012) and the middle-grade Rosie Raja and Time Travellers series. She is also known for writing a modern continuation of Enid Blyton's The Famous Five.

== Early life ==
Born at her grandmother's house with origins in Surat, India, Ahmed moved to England with her mother and grew up in Bolton, Greater Manchester and Leytonstone, East London.

== Career ==
Ahmed began her career working in advertising and as a researcher in the House of Commons. Her debut young adult (YA) novel Secrets of the Henna Girl was published in 2012. Secrets of the Henna Girl won a 2013 Redbridge Children's Book Award in the Teenage category and was shortlisted for a PPC Award and a Sheffield Children's Book Award. Ahmed also won Published Writer of the Year at the 2012 Brit Writers Awards.

Ahmed returned to writing in 2020 with the picture book Under the Great Plum Tree, which made the USBBY Outstanding International Book List. She also started a biographical series with My Story: Noor-un-Nissa Inayat Khan. This was followed by My Story: Sophia Duleep Singh in 2022.

In 2022, Bloomsbury Education acquired the rights to publish Ahmed's World War II-set Rosie Raja series. Rosie Raja: Churchill's Spy was a Read for Empathy collection pick. The third book in the series Rosie Raja: Undercover Codebreaker won Best Crime Fiction for Children at the 2025 CrimeFest Awards.

Ahmed was commissioned by Hachette UK to write modern day-set books continuing Enid Blyton's The Famous Five series. Also in 2023, Little Tiger (a Hardie Grant Publishing imprint) acquired the rights to publish Ahmed's middle-grade Time Travellers series.

In 2025, Andersen Press acquired the rights to publish the middle-grade adventure novel Escape from the Child Snatchers.

== Bibliography ==
=== My Story ===
- Noor-un-Nissa Inayat Khan (2020)
- Sophia Duleep Singh (2022)

=== Rosie Raja ===
- Rosie Raja: Churchill's Spy (2022)
- Rosie Raja: Mission to Cairo (2023)
- Rosie Raja: Undercover Codebreaker (2024)

=== Time Travellers ===
- Adventure Calling (2024)
- Secrets and Spies (2024)

=== Standalone novels ===
- Secrets of the Henna Girl (2012)
- Under Fire (2025)
- Escape from the Child Snatchers

=== Picture books ===
- Under the Great Plum Tree (2020)
- The Best Eid Ever (2024)

=== The Famous Five Adventures ===
- Timmy and the Treasure (2022)
- Five and the Runaway Dog (2022)
- Message in a Bottle (2023)
- The Mysterious Noise (2023)
- Five and the Missing Prize (2024)
- The Library Mystery (2024)
- The Painting Puzzle (2025)
- Trouble at the Farm (2025)

=== Reading practice ===
- Ruby Ali's Mission Break Up (2021)
- Here to Stay (2022)
- Searching for Jamila (2022)
- Brave Spies (2022)
- Aran the Home Visit Pharmacist (2022)
- Zara the Youth Worker (2022)
- Follow the Moon (2022)
- The Golden Age of Islam (2023)
- The Wedding Shoes (2023)
- Inspiring Feminists (2023)
- Zakir the Storyteller (2024)
- The Lost Medal (2024)
- The Pasta Disaster (2024)
- The Hyde Park Detectives (2024)

=== Short stories ===
- in Ladybird Tales of Super Heroes (2019)
- in Bedtime Stories: Amazing Asian Tales from the Past (2022)
- in War Girls (2024)

=== Essays ===
- in It's Not About the Burqa: Muslim Women on Faith, Feminism, Sexuality and Race (2020), edited by Mariam Khan
- "Tears and Tantrums" in A Match Made in Heaven: British Muslim Women Write about Love and Desire (2020), edited by Claire Chambers

=== Other ===
- History: A Children's Encyclopedia (2022)
- Our World in Pictures: The History Book (2023)
