= Nagarkanda Upazila =

Nagarkanda নগরকান্দা
- Upazila
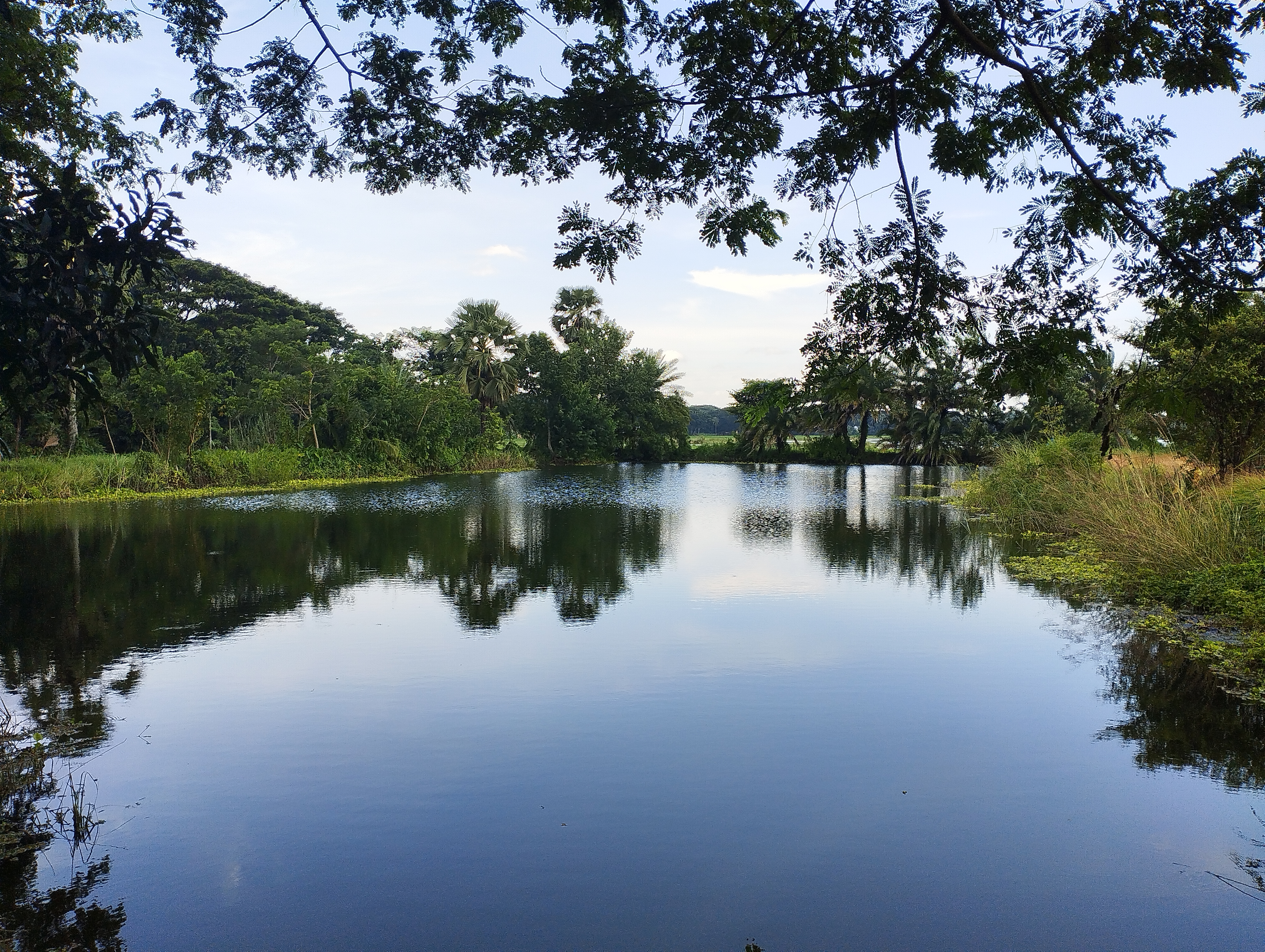
- A pond in Nagarkanda upazila

- Coordinates: 23°24.9′N 89°53.5′E
- Country: Bangladesh
- Division: Dhaka
- District: Faridpur

Area
  - Total: 192.20 km^{2} (74.21 sq mi)

Population (2022)
  - Total: 222,938
  - Density: 1,159.9/km^{2} (3,004.2/sq mi)
- Time zone: UTC+6 (BST)
- Postal code: 7840
- Area code: 06327
- Website: nagarkanda.faridpur.gov.bd

Nagarkanda Upazila mauza geocode map

Nagarkanda (Bengali: নগরকান্দা) is an upazila of Faridpur District in the Division of Dhaka, Bangladesh.

In this upazila, in the village of Kodalia, the Pakistani Army killed at least 22 people including women and children on 1 June 1971. The incident is also recorded on film.

== Geography ==
Nagarkanda is located at 23.4153°N 89.8917°E. It has 42,904 households and a total area of 192.20 km^{2}.

== Demographics ==
Religions in Nagarkanda Upazila (2022)
Religion	Percent
Islam	92.68%
Hinduism	7.31%
Other or not stated	0.01%

According to the 2022 Bangladeshi census, Nagarkanda Upazila had 52,678 households and a population of 222,938. 10.08% of the population were under 5 years of age. Nagarkanda had a literacy rate (age 7 and over) of 71.09%: 72.41% for males and 69.83% for females, and a sex ratio of 96.03 males for every 100 females. 24,639 (11.05%) lived in urban areas.

As of the 2011 Census of Bangladesh, Nagarkanda upazila had 42,904 households and a population of 197,898. 48,422 (24.47%) were under 10 years of age. Nagarkanda had an average literacy rate of 46.79%, compared to the national average of 51.8%, and a sex ratio of 1013 females per 1000 males. 15,805 (7.99%) of the population lived in urban areas.

According to the 1991 Bangladesh census, Nagarkanda had a population of 267, 193. Males constituted 50.18% of the population, and females 49.82%. The population aged 18 or over was 131, 533. Nagarkanda had an average literacy rate of 22.6% (7+ years), against the national average of 32.4%. Most of the people depends on cultivation of land. Rice, Jute, Onion are the main crops. Onion of this locality is famous all around the country.

== Administration ==
Nagarkanda Upazila is divided into Nagarkanda Municipality and nine union parishads: Char Jashordi, Dangi, Fulsuti, Kaichail, Laskardia, Kodalia Shohid Nagar, Purapara, Ramnagar, and Talma. The union parishads are subdivided into 124 mauzas and 169 villages.

Nagarkanda Municipality is subdivided into 9 wards and 15 mahallas.

== Education ==
- Talma Nazim Uddin High School. P.O. Talma.
- M.N Academy.(Est. 1916) zamindar of Baish Rashi established this Institute with the help of the then Local Elite Class.
- Nagarkanda Govt College. P.O. Nagarkanda
- Nabocum college.
- Qasimul Ulum Islamia Madrasa Jungurdi Nagarkanda.
- Nagarkanda Girls School. P.O. Nagarkanda
- Laskardia Atiqur Rahman High school.
- Poradia Syed Ali Khan High School.
- Ramnagar High School. P.O. Kunjanagar
- Krishnerdandi High School. P.O. Kunjanagar
- Bilgobindapur High School. P.O. Kathia Kalibari
- Islami Adarsha shishu shikkhaloy.P.O.Nagarkanda
- Fulsuti Abdul Alem Chowdhury High School.P.O Fulsuti

== Notable people ==
- Kaykobad (1857–1951), poet
- Mohammad AKM Khairuzzaman Mia (1932–2018), politician
- Khondkar family of Kodalia village
  - Khondkar Nazmul Huda (1938–1975), army colonel
  - Naheed Ezaher Khondkar, member of parliament
- Mollah family of Qazikanda village
  - Moosa Bin Shamsher (born 1945), richest man in Bangladesh
  - Bobby Hajjaj (born 1974), politician

== See also ==
- Districts of Bangladesh
- Divisions of Bangladesh
