= Azizah =

American Muslim magazine

Cover of Azizah

Azizah is an American magazine for North American Muslim women. The magazine was first published in October 2000. It was run by Tayyibah Taylor and Marlina Soerakoesoemah. Tayyibah Taylor, who was also the editor-in-chief of the magazine, died on September 4, 2014.

The headquarters of Azizah is in Atlanta, Georgia. The magazine is published by WOW Publishing Inc.

== See more ==
- Azizah Magazine a Voice of Muslim Women in US
