= Saifuzzaman Chowdhury Jewel =

Bangladeshi politician

- সাইফুজ্জামান চৌধুরী জুয়েল

Member of Bangladesh Parliament
- In office 1988–1991
- Preceded by: Mohammad AAM Khairuzzaman Mia

Personal details
- Party: Jatiya Party (Ershad)

Saifuzzaman Chowdhury Jewel is a Jatiya Party (Ershad) politician in Bangladesh and a former member of parliament for Faridpur-2.

== Career ==
Jewel was elected to parliament from Faridpur-2 as a Jatiya Party candidate in 1988. He is the joint secretary of the Parliament Members' Club.
