= Yahiya Emerick =

American Muslim author and scholar (1971–2026)

Yahiya Emerick (born John Joseph Emerick; 1971 – July 11, 2026) was an American Muslim author and educator. He was the president of the Islamic Foundation of North America. Emerick wrote and/or published over 50 books on Islam.

== Background ==
Emerick was born in the Midwest in 1971, into a Baptist family. He was an avid reader from a young age. His curiosity about religion was sparked around age 15 after a sermon on the Trinity left him more confused than enlightened, setting him on a path of theological questioning that would eventually lead him away from the faith of his upbringing. That search came to a head during his freshman year at Michigan State University. After roughly six months of reading the Qur'an, he found he could not deny what he experienced as a personal appeal from God to the reader, and at age nineteen, during the winter of 1988–1989, he converted to Sunni Islam. He later obtained a graduate degree in history.

He served as a Muslim lecturer, educator, prayer leader, and author. He founded Amirah Publishing in 1992, in order to further his goal of publishing American-oriented literature on Islam. Emerick's Complete Idiot's Guide to Understanding Islam has been distributed worldwide by Alpha Books. From 1998 until 2008 his books were all published by Noorart Inc.

Emerick died on July 11, 2026, at the age of 55.

== Educator and institutional roles ==
Alongside his writing, Emerick built a long career in Islamic education. He served as vice-principal of a full-time Islamic school in Westbury, New York, and taught in Sunday schools, summer programs, and full-time Muslim schools across North America. He also served as president of the Islamic Foundation of North America (IFNA), a nonprofit devoted to Islamic education and outreach, a role he held into the early 2000s. He was active as a lecturer, prayer leader, and voice in interfaith dialogue.

== Books ==
- Complete Idiot's Guide to Understanding Islam
- Critical Lives: Muhammad
- Learning About Islam
- Complete Idiot's Guide to Rumi Meditations
- The Meaning of the Holy Qur'an in Today's English
- My First Book About Islam
- What Islam is All About
- The Seafaring Beggar and Other Stories
- How to Tell Others About Islam
- Ahmad Deen and the Curse of the Aztec Warrior
- Ahmad Deen and the Jinn at Shaolin
- Layla Deen and the Case of the Ramadan Rogue
- The Holy Qur'an for School Children
- Muslim Youth Speak
- Color and Learn Salah
- In the Path of the Holy Prophet
- Test Masters for What Islam is All About
- Test Masters for Learning About Islam
- My First Book about Eman
- Full Circle: Story and Coloring Book
- Isabella: a Girl of Muslim Spain
- Layla Deen and the Popularity Contest
