= Na'ima B. Robert =

British author (born 1977)

Na'ima B Robert is an author of multicultural literature and founding editor of the UK-based Muslim women's publication, SISTERS Magazine. Born in Leeds to a Scottish father and Zulu mother, both from South Africa, Robert grew up in Zimbabwe and attended university in England. She converted to Islam in 1998.

== Early life ==
Robert's family moved from England to Ethiopia when she was two years old and then four years later relocated to Zimbabwe where Robert received her formal primary education. Robert had a typical middle-class childhood with her younger brother and sister in the suburbs of the capital city Harare. As well as being immersed in Zimbabwean culture, Robert's parents instilled in the children their South African roots and a strong political consciousness. Her father, Robert McLaren, was a senior lecturer at the University of Zimbabwe and her mother, Thembi McLaren, was an entrepreneur. After graduating high school in Zimbabwe, Robert returned to England for university and earned a first-class degree from the University of London.

== Conversion ==
During her university studies Robert travelled to Egypt as an amateur musician and singer playing traditional Zimbabwean compositions at a music festival. Her initial reaction to the hijab-wearing Muslim women was to be "appalled" but finally asked an especially beautiful Egyptian woman why she would choose to cover her beauty: 'Because,' she said, 'I want to be judged for what I say and what I do, not for what I look like." After their exchange Robert says, "I began to think about my life, about my own self-image and how I wanted to grow and develop." Robert returned to London and began reading the Marmaduke Pickthall translation of the Quran, learning about Islam and Islamic law, and she gave "dressing modestly a try." Over the Christmas holiday that same year Robert travelled to "Muslim Africa, to Guinea" where she found that "As someone still steeped in the ideals of Black nationalism, these Muslims appealed to my own African identity and my sense of Black pride." In Guinea Robert began making the Islamic five daily prayers, fasted during Ramadan and upon her return to London announced her shahada (declaration of Islamic faith) in 1998.

== Writing career ==
=== Fiction ===
After teaching in the classroom and founding a private home school, Robert began writing multicultural picture books with Muslim themes for children. Her first picture book, The Swirling Hijab, was included in the Booktrust programme. Robert's picture books and young adult fiction have had cross-over appeal being accepted for inclusion in state settings, such as schools and multicultural training, as well as recognised as Islamic fiction amongst Muslims. To date she has published thirteen picture books for children, many of which are used in dual language settings and are published in up to 31 languages, including Tamil, Kurdish, Portuguese, Japanese, Russian, Yoruba, Czech, Arabic, Polish, Chinese, Urdu, Panjabi, French, Swahili and Farisi. Journey Through Islamic Arts was awarded the UK National Literacy Trust Association WOW! Award for Best Children's titles.

After the success of her autobiography, From My Sisters' Lips, Robert began writing young adult (YA) Islamic fiction. Her first YA novel, From Somalia, With Love was inspired by a weekend retreat with a group of Somali youth, arranged by the Somali Integration Team. From Somalia, With Love is one of the few novels available with Somali Muslim characters and subjects. It was included in the World Book Day 2009 school's pack and was long-listed for the United Kingdom Literacy Association Award. Robert's second YA novel, Boy vs. Girl, challenged common stereotypes about young Muslims in Britain and featured a cameo appearance of Urban Islamic graffiti artist Muhammed 'Aerosol Arabic' Ali. Robert's third YA title, Far From Home, is a historical fiction novel set in Zimbabwe and is featured in the 2011 Pop-Up Festival of Stories in London.

In February 2021, she wrote and published 'Show Up', a personal story of the author reflecting on her journey of life with references to quotes from the Qur'an, Hadith and contemporary thinkers.

== Niqāb ==
Robert is a full-time observer of the niqāb (Islamic face-veil) and a vocal advocate for women's right to choose to fully cover. Soon after becoming Muslim in 1998 Robert began to wear the niqāb full-time in 1999. In her memoir, From My Sisters' Lips, Robert explained the effect of wearing niqāb, "[The covered woman] cannot be judged on her appearance because nothing personal about her can be seen...She does not feel the need to live up to society's changing expectations of women's bodies...So whoever relates to her must relate to what she has presented – be it what she says, does or thinks." Robert is one of the founding members of Veiled Justice and has represented the East London Mosque on Muslim women's issues. She has spoken in support of the niqāb in numerous British media, including The Telegraph, BBC News, The Times Online, BBC Radio 4's The Moral Maze and Channel 4's Undercover Mosque series; as well as speaking to Muslim and international media outlets, such as for Islam Channel and AIM TV.

Robert's young adult fiction novel Boy vs. Girl includes the niqāb-wearing character, Auntie Najma. The Auntie Najma character has been both negatively and positively criticised as either an unrealistic portrayal or as a positive role-model for Muslim youth. Robert has said that Auntie Najma, like the other characters, is an amalgamation of real sisters she knows personally.

== Bibliography ==
=== Picture books ===
- The Swirling Hijaab (Mantra Lingua, 2002, paperback) ISBN 1-85269-119-0 ISBN 978-1-85269-119-6
- Journey Through Islamic Art (Mantra Lingua, 2005, hardcover) ISBN 1-84444-350-7 ISBN 978-1-84444-350-5
- Welcome to the World Baby (Mantra Lingua, 2005, paperback) ISBN 1-84444-633-6 ISBN 978-1-84444-633-9
- Yum! Let's Eat! (Mantra Lingua, 2008, paperback) ISBN 1-84611-564-7 ISBN 978-1-84611-564-6
- Ramadan Moon (Frances Lincoln, 2009, hardcover) ISBN 1-84507-922-1 ISBN 978-1-84507-922-2

=== Published as Thando McLaren ===
- Letters Around the World (Tango Books, 2004, hardcover) ISBN 1-85707-617-6 ISBN 978-1-85707-617-2
- All Kinds of Homes (Tango Books, 2005, hardcover) ISBN 1-85707-677-X ISBN 978-1-85707-677-6
- My Day, My Way (Tango Books, 2005, hardcover) ISBN 1-85707-633-8 ISBN 978-1-85707-633-2
- All Kinds of Transport (Tango Books, 2006, hardcover) ISBN 1-85707-653-2 ISBN 978-1-85707-653-0
- Treasure Hunt: Travel Back in Time (Tango Books, 2008, hardcover) ISBN 1-85707-714-8 ISBN 978-1-85707-714-8
- My Around the World Scrapbook (Tango Books, 2008, hardcover) ISBN 1-85707-702-4 ISBN 978-1-85707-702-5

=== Young adult fiction ===
- From Somalia, with Love (Frances Lincoln, 2009, paperback) ISBN 1-84507-832-2 ISBN 978-1-84507-832-4
- Boy vs. Girl (Frances Lincoln, 2010, paperback) ISBN 0-593-05441-5 ISBN 978-0-593-05441-3
- Far From Home (Frances Lincoln, 2011, paperback) ISBN 1-84780-006-8 ISBN 978-1-84780-006-0
- Black Sheep (2013)
- She Wore Red Trainers: A Muslim Love Story (Kube Publishing Ltd, 2014, paperback) ISBN 1-84774-065-0 ISBN 978-1-84774-065-6

=== Non-fiction ===
- From My Sisters' Lips (Bantam Press, 2005, hardcover) ISBN 0-593-05441-5 ISBN 978-0-593-05441-3

== Bibliography ==
- Ahmed, Yusuf (26 October 2010), Wanted: Role Models , Campus Islam, retrieved 9 June 2011
- Bovey Alhakawati, Nicole (29 April 2007), Book Review: From My Sisters' Lips, On Islam, retrieved 9 June 2011
- Channel 4 (2008), Undercover Mosque, Channel 4 Dispatches, retrieved 9 June 2011
- Chowdhury, Lothifa (20 June 2008), A Tale of a Somali Girl, Muslim Weekly, retrieved 9 June 2011
- East Sussex County Council Fostering Service (2008), Black and Ethnic Minority Fostering, East Sussex County Council Fostering, retrieved 9 June 2011
- Bryony Gordon (25 April 2005), That Muslim Woman Could be Happier Than You, The Telegraph, retrieved 9 June 2011
- Khan, Rahla (19 July 2010), There's Way More to the World Than MTV, A1 Saudi Arabia News, retrieved 9 June 2011
- Khwaja, Ayman (September 2009, Issue 60), Book Review: Ramadan Moon, emel, retrieved 9 June 2011
- Living Halal (5 April 2008), Facing the Challenges, Savoring the Triumphs: Life of a New Muslim, Ummah Wide Video, retrieved 10 June 2011
- Nour DV Nour DV Sponsors, retrieved 10 June 2011
- Rawe, Julie (29 April 2009), Book Review: From Somalia, With Love , Muslim Voices, retrieved 9 June 2011
- Robert, Na'ima B. (2006), From My Sisters' Lips, Bantam Books, ISBN 0-553-81717-5 ISBN 9780553817171, retrieved 9 June 2011
- Robert, Na'ima B. (18 April 2008), Inspiration in The Countryside From Somalia, With Love Blogspot, retrieved 9 June 2011
- Robert, Na'ima B. (1 June 2008), Amazing Glimpse Into Ordinary Yet Extraordinary Lives, The Guardian, retrieved 9 June 2011
- Robert, Na'ima B. (25 July 2008), Behind the Veil: The Online Diary of a British Muslim Woman, The Times Online, retrieved 9 June 2011
- Sawyer, Miranda (22 October 2006), Luxury Items and Duck Walks, The Guardian Radio "Moral Maze", retrieved 9 June 2011
- Saya (12 July 2010), Na'ima B Robert on 'Boy vs. Girl', The Rockpool, retrieved 10 June 2011
- Solace Solace For Reverts Sisters in Difficulty, retrieved 10 June 2011
- Suleaman, Nasreen (5 November 2006), How Veil Remarks Reinforced Its Support, BBC News, retrieved 9 June 2011
- Umm Imran (10 August 2010), Book Review: Boy vs. Girl, Mum and Muslim Magazine, retrieved 9 June 2011
- Show Up (15 November 2021), Show Up, retrieved 15 November 2021
