= List of Namasudras =

This article contains a list of notable people from the Namasudra caste, organized by profession, field, or focus.

== Social reformers ==
- Harichand Thakur, founder of Matua Mahasangha
- Binapani Devi, the matriarch of Matua community, also known as "Boro Maa".

== Judiciary and bureaucracy ==
- Upendra Nath Biswas, former joint director and Minister (East) of the CBI, MLA from Bagdah and former Minister of Backward Classes & Welfare of Government of West Bengal. (2011–16)
- Mukunda Behari Mullick, former lawyer, professor of Pali, senate member in Calcutta University, founder of All Bengal Namasudra Association, MLA and minister in first A. K. Fazlul Huq 's government

== Politicians ==
=== Ministers ===
- Jogendra Nath Mandal, one of the leading founding fathers of the modern state of Pakistan and first minister of law and labour of the country
- Birat Chandra Mandal, minister and member of Constituent Assembly of Pakistan
- Kanti Biswas, former MLA of Gaighata and minister of Youth Affairs and Home (Passport)
- Shantanu Thakur, M.P from Bangaon and Minister of State of Ministry of Ports, Shipping and Waterways in the Second Modi ministry (2021–present).

=== MPs and MLA ===
- Apurba Lal Majumdar, two-time MLA and former speaker of West Bengal Legislative Assembly
- Kapil Krishna Thakur, former Sanghadhipati of Matua Mahasangha and M.P from Bangaon
- Mamata Bala Thakur, religious mother of the Matua Mahasangha and M.P from Bangaon
- Pramatha Ranjan Thakur, former MLA and head of Matua Mahasangha

== Writers and journalists ==
- Manoranjan Bayapari, Indian Bengali writer and socio-political activist, also known as the pioneer of ‘Dalit literature in Bengali’
- Manohar Mauli Biswas, bilingual poet, essayist and writer of Bengali Dalit Literature
- Kalyani Thakur, Dalit feminist writer

== See also ==
- Chandala
