= Gopal Baba Walangkar =

Indian social activist (1840–1904)

Gopal Baba Walangkar, also known as Gopal Krishna Walangkar (1840–1904) is an early example of an activist working to release the untouchable people of India from their historic socio-economic oppression and is generally considered to be the pioneer of that movement. He developed a racial theory to explain the oppression and also published the monthly journal Vital-Vidhvansak, targeted at the Brahmanical Orthodoxy.

== Life ==
Gopal Baba Walangkar was born into a family of Mahar caste around 1840 at Ravdul, near Mahad in what is now Raigad district, Maharashtra. He was related to Ramabai, who in 1906 married the polymathic social reformer, B. R. Ambedkar. In 1886, after serving in the army, Walangkar settled at Dapoli and became influenced by another early social reformer, Jyotirao Phule, thus being a link between two of the most significant reform families of the period.

Walangkar was appointed to the local taluk board of Mahad in 1895, which displeased the members from the upper castes and caused considerable debate in newspapers. He died at Ravdul in 1904.

== Activism ==
The Aryan invasion theory was in vogue at this time. Gopal extended Phule's version of this racial theory, that the untouchable people of India were the indigenous inhabitants and that the Brahmin people were descended from Aryans who had invaded the country.

In 1888, Gopal began publishing the monthly journal titled Vital-Vidhvansak (Destroyer of Brahmanical or Ceremonial Pollution), which was the first to have the untouchable people as its target audience. He also wrote articles for Marathi-language newspapers such as Sudharak and Deenbandhu, as well as composed couplets in Marathi that were intended to inspire the people.

Having read Hindu religious texts, Walangkar concluded that caste was contrived by the Aryan invaders to control the Anaryans (indigenous people). In 1889, he published Vital Viduvansan (Annihilation of Ceremonial Pollution), which protested the position of untouchables in society and raised consciousness regarding what those people should expect. He addressed this pamphlet, which was crafted as a collection of 26 questions, to the elites of Maharashtrian society. It was an awareness-raising style, in the hope that the paternalist elements of society would take heed but it also warned that the untouchables might leave India unless their situation improved. A further significant work, titled Hindu Dharma Darpan, appeared in 1894.

Walangkar also at once empowered the Mahars and diminished the influence of Brahmin priests by forming a group of Mahar astrologers to set the times for religious ceremonies, which was effectively the only service that Brahmins had been willing to perform for the caste.

Walangkar founded the Anarya Dosh-Parihar Mandali (Society for the Removal of Evils Among the Non-Aryans). Some sources say this took place in the same year that he left the army but Anand Teltumbde gives 1890 as the date and suggests it was connected with an issue relating to military recruitment. The Mahar were initially heavily recruited into British military units, but this process slowed after the Indian Rebellion of 1857. Their recruitment was halted under Lord Kitchener in the early 1890s. Before the rebellion, Mahar regiments made up one-sixth of the Bombay units of the British East India Company but thereafter they were pensioned off and gradually removed from military service. Mahar recruitment reached its nadir in the early 1890s when Kitchener halted the recruitment of untouchables in Maharashtra in favor of "martial races," such as the Marathas and other north-western communities. The Mahar community attempted to confront this block with a petition circulated among the Mahar, Chamar, and Mang former soldiers—all Marathi-speaking untouchables—but the movement was unable to organize and submit their petition. It was Walangkar, through the Anarya Dosh-Parihar Mandali, who attempted this petition.

Walangkar is generally considered to be the pioneer of the Dalit movement, along with Harichand Thakur through his Matua involving the Namasudra (Chandala) community in the Bengal Presidency. Dr. B.R. Ambedkar himself believed Walangkar to be the progenitor.
