= Orakandi Thakur Bari =

Sacred Place of Matua Community

- ওড়াকান্দি ধাম

Religion
- Affiliation: Hinduism
- District: Gopalganj
- Festival: বারুণি উৎসব

Location
- Location: Orakandi, Gopalganj, Bangladesh
- Country: Bangladesh

Architecture
- Founder: Shi Shi Harichand Thakur
- Established: c. 1860
- Temple: 10+

Orakandi Thakur Bari (Bangla: ওড়াকান্দি ঠাকুর বাড়ি) is a pilgrimage for Matua Community in Bangladesh. It is popularly known for the birthplace of Sri Sri Harichand Thakur, founder of the Matua Community and his son Sri Sri Guruchand Thakur, a social reformer. Matua Movement, a reforming movement for the upliftment of backward community started in about 1860. The place comes to the limelight after Indian Prime Minister Narendra Modi visited here on 28 March 2021.

== Historical significance ==
The nineteenth century‘s history of Bengal was remarkable in many aspects. The Hindu society was marred with enumerable trifles and reached its worst ever level. Social status of the lower caste Hindus was indescribable. In such an inhuman condition, Shri Shri Harichand Thakur was born in Safladanga village of Faridpur district in 1812. From the very beginning of his life, he could win the respect and honor of the downtrodden men by his divinely miracles and many people became his disciples. The zamindars of Salfladanga plotted against him. He was forced to leave his birthplace and became settled in Orakandi. His name spread throughout the area. He stood against the oppression and exploitation of upper-class and formed the Matua Mahasangha in 1860. Gradually the depressed and downtrodden people came under the religious banner of the ‘Matua Religion’. In 5 March 1878, Shri Shri Harichand Thakur died at age 65. Meanwhile his son Shri Shri Guruchand Thakur (1846–1936) started leading the Matua Mahasangha. During his strong leadership, in a letter dated 8 April 1873, the district magistrate of Faridpur, C. A. Kelly, told the divisional commissioner, Dacca (Dhaka) that in the early part of that year the lower-caste Hindu held a general strike in the district resolving not to serve anybody of the upper class. He established many schools for the upliftment of the lower-caste Hindu community. He preached the abolition of caste inequality, gender equality via performing secular duties. Matua Movement is one of the first lower-caste uprisings in the Indian subcontinent. Orakandi was the epicenter of this movement. Under his guidance, the Widow Remarriage system was also introduced in the Namasudra community in 1909. With the help of Australian Missionary Dr. C.S. Mead, he also tried to increase the awareness regarding basic needs like health check-ups, environmental awareness, etc. among the Namasudras. In 1907, he established a higher English medium school, named Dr. C.S. Mead School, in Orakandi Village. Followed by a 1907 memorandum submitted by Guruchand Thakur to the Bengal Government, the lower-caste Hindu (Chandal) was renamed Namasudra in 1911 after 40 years of struggle. As of now, Matua Mahasangha is one of the leading organizations that is working for the upliftment of the Bengali Namasudra community residing in India and Bangladesh. ==

== Temples and Holy Places ==
In West Bengal, Pramath Ranjan Thakur, the great-grandson of Harichand Thakur founded the Thakurbari in Thakurnagar. After Partition of Bengal (1947), Thakurnagar became under Kolkata whereas before partition it was under Jessore district. Orakandi Thakur Bari has several temples such as Hari Mondi, Shantilata Mondir, Nat Mondir and so on. There are Kamona Sagor and Dudh Sagor where the pilgrims take holy bath during Baruni Snan. Every Wednesday, many devotees come for a visit to Orakandi Thakur Bari. It is counted as a very sacred place still now.

== Festivals ==
Baruni Maha Mela is observed annually in Orakandi Thakur Bari. It starts following the birth tithi of Shri Shri Harichand Thakur that is Krishna Trayodoshi Tithi of Phalguna month. Around 15 lakhs pilgrims (Matua) get together from all around the World to take holy bath in Kamona Sagor and Dudh Sagor. Three days festivals is organized each year.
