= Hindu pilgrimage sites =

Unlike some other religions, Hindus are not required to undertake pilgrimages during their lifetime. However, most Hindus go on such journeys to numerous iconic sites including those below:

== India ==
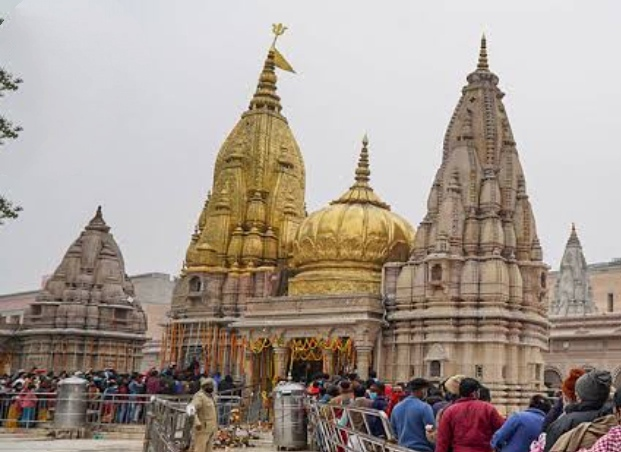
Varanasi known as Kashi is one of the holiest pilgrimage sites.

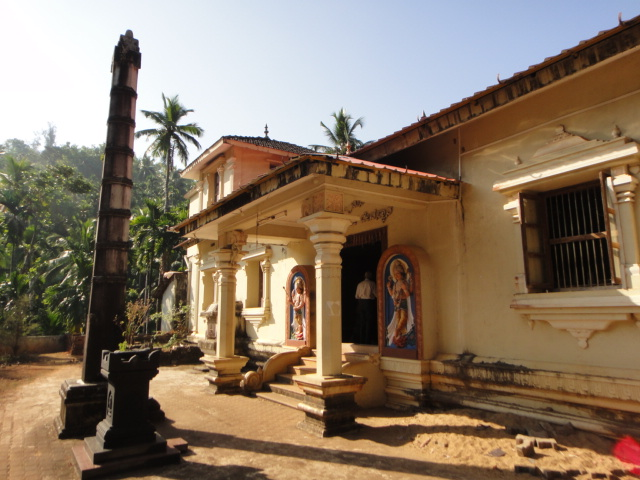
Kodlamane Shree Vishnumurthy Temple

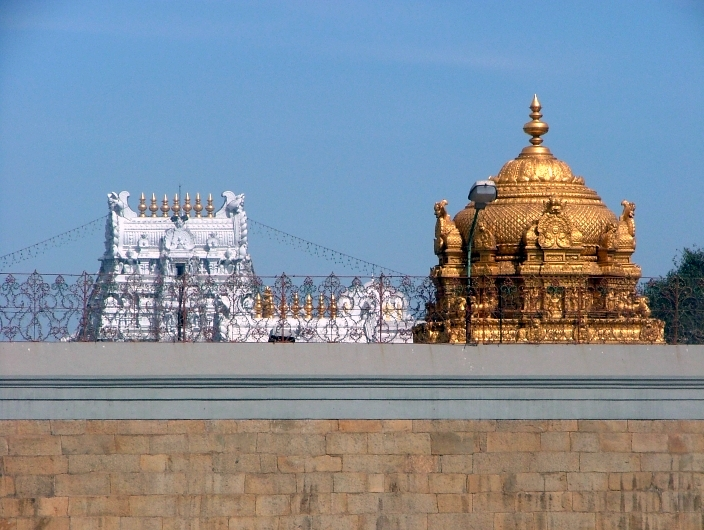
Tirupati temple

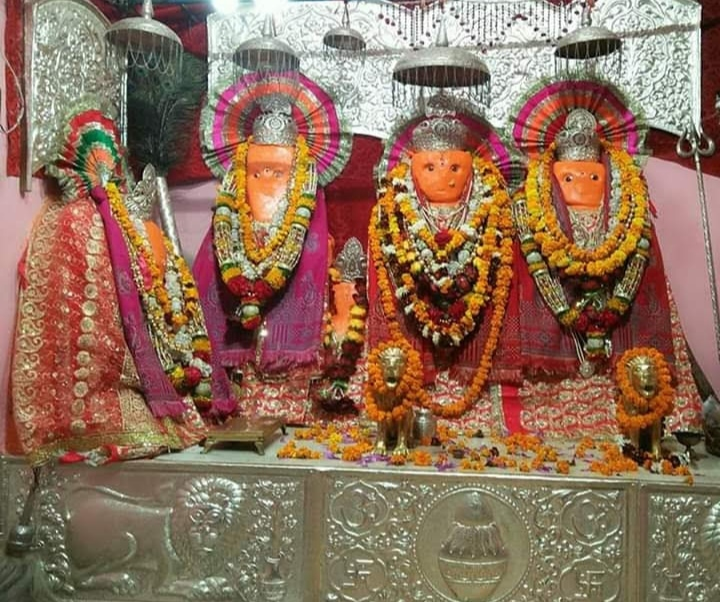
Shakumbhari devi, right side Bhima and Bhramari left side Goddess Shatakshi

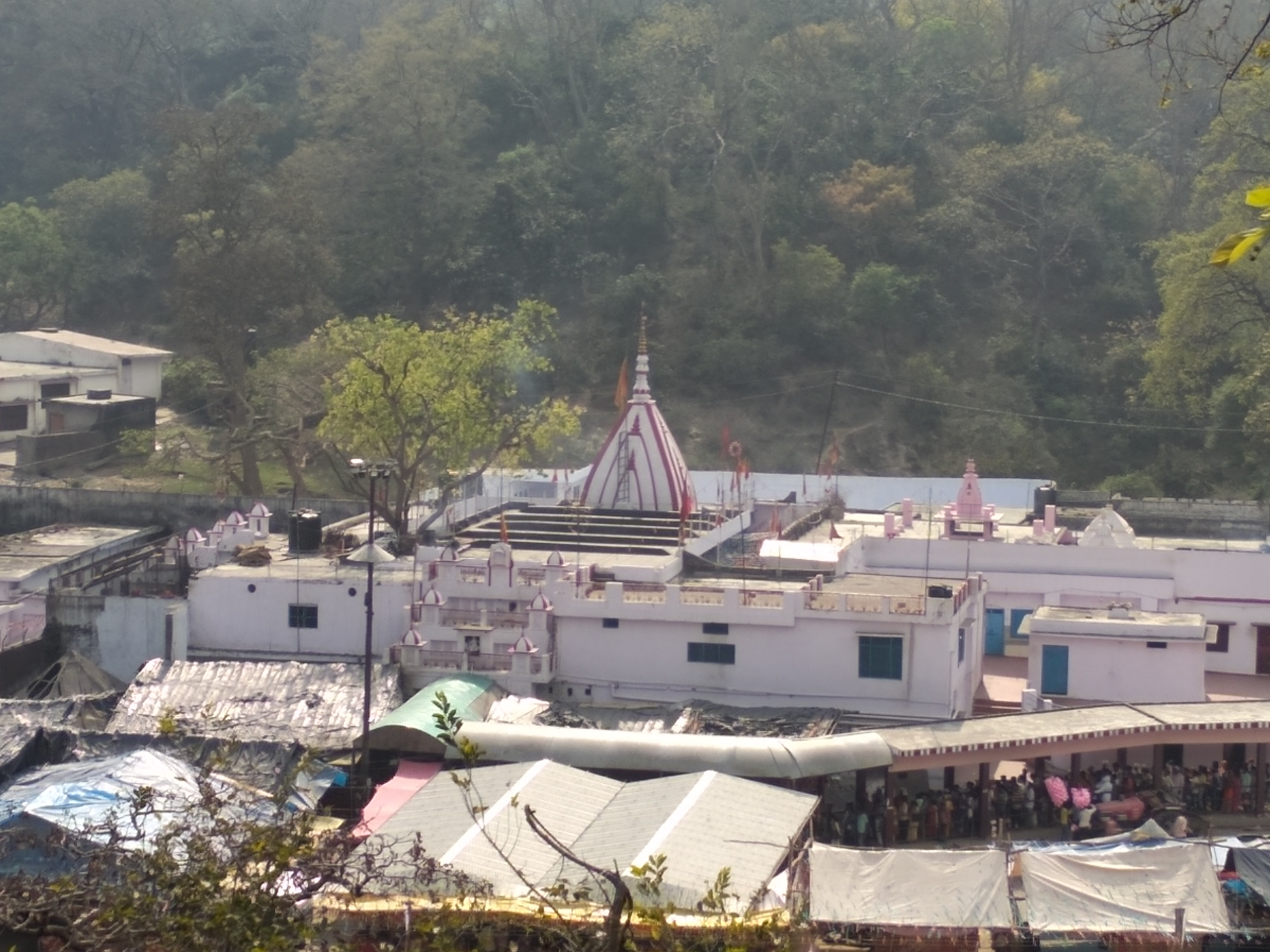
Ancient Temple of Shakumbhari devi is near Saharanpur UP

Char Dham (Famous Four Pilgrimage sites): The four holy sites Puri (in the east), Rameswaram (in the south), Dwarka(in the west), and Badrinath (in the north) constitute the Char Dham Yatra. Alternatively the Himalayan towns of Badrinath, Kedarnath, Gangotri, and Yamunotri compose the Chota Char Dham (four small abodes) pilgrimage circuit.

Kumbh Mela: The Kumbh Mela (the "festival of the sacred pitcher") is one of the holiest of Hindu pilgrimages that is held every three years; the location is rotated among Prayagraj, Haridwar, Nashik, and Ujjain.

Old Holy cities as per Puranic Texts: Varanasi formerly known as Kashi, Prayagraj also known as Prayag, Haridwar-Rishikesh, Mathura-Vrindavan, Kurukshetra, the Land of Bhagavad Gita in Haryana and Ayodhya.

Old Temple cities: Puri, which hosts a major Vaishnava Jagannath temple and Rath Yatra celebration; Katra, home to the Vaishno Devi temple; Tirumala – Tirupati, home to the Tirumala Venkateswara Temple; Shirdi, home to the Sai Baba of Shirdi temple; Madurai Meenakshi and Sri Ranganathaswamy Temple in Sri Rangam; Dwarkadhish Temple – Dwarka, home to Dwarkadhish form of Sri Krishna; Radharani Temple – Barsana, dedicated to Sri Radha, Sabarimala, where Swami Ayyappan is worshipped; Sri Padmanabhaswamy Temple at Thiruvananthapuram, Kerala; Guruvayur temple at Guruvayur. The oldest of these temple pilgrimages is the Pandharpur Wari which is said to be in tradition from the past 800 years.

New Pilgrimage Centres: Three comparatively recent temples which attract large number of pilgrims are Belur Math, the hub of the worldwide Ramakrishna Movement in West Bengal, Dakshineswar Kali Temple, Kolkata West Bengal; Tarapith West Bengal, Vivekananda Rock Memorial at Kanyakumari; Sri Ramana Ashram at Tiruvannamalai; and ISKCON temples in Ujjain, Bangalore, Patna, Tirumala, Vishakapatnam, Delhi, Chennai, and Mumbai. Ramakrishna Mission Swami Vivekananda's Ancestral House and Cultural Centre, the birthplace of Swami Vivekananda is also another popular destination. Nandikeshwari Temple West Bengal,Kankalitala, Kiriteswari Temple, Nabadwip, Mayapur,

Shakta pitha: An important set of pilgrimages are the Shakta pithas, where the Mother Goddess is worshipped, the three principal ones being Kalighat, Tarapith and Kamakhya.

Jyotirlingas: Other set of important pilgrimages are the Jyotirlingas, where lord Shiva is worshipped in the form of Shiva Lingas. There are twelve Jyotirlingas in India. The twelve Jyotirlingas are:

- Bhimashankar Temple, near Pune
- Somnath at Veraval in Gujarat
- Mallikarjuna Jyotirlinga at Srisailam in Andhra Pradesh
- Mahakaleshwar Jyotirlinga at Ujjain in Madhya Pradesh
- Omkareshwar in Madhya Pradesh
- Kedarnath in Uttarakhand
- Vishwanath Temple at Varanasi in Uttar Pradesh
- Trimbakeshwar Shiva Temple at Nashik in Maharashtra
- Baidyanath Jyotirlinga at Deoghar in Jharkhand
- Aundha Nagnath in Hingoli, Maharashtra or Nageshvara Jyotirlinga at Dwarka
- Rameshwar at Rameshwaram in Tamil Nadu
- Grishneshwar at Verul near Ellora Aurangabad

== Sri Lanka ==
- Pancha Ishwarams – the five ancient Shiva temples of the island from classical antiquity.
- The Arunagirinathar-traversed ancient Murugan pilgrimage route of Sri Lanka including
  - Maviddapuram Kandaswamy Temple, Maviddapuram, Kankesanthurai
  - Nallur Kandaswamy temple, Jaffna,
  - Koneswaram temple, Trincomalee,
  - Verugal Murugan Kovil, Verugal Aru, Verugal, Trincomalee District
  - Thirukkovil Sithira Velayutha Swami Kovil, in Thirukkovil, Batticaloa,
  - Arugam Bay, Amparai
  - Panamai, Amparai
  - Ukanthamalai Murugan Kovil, in Okanda, Kumana National Park
  - Kataragama temple, Katirkamam in the South.

== Mauritius ==
These Hindu pilgrimage sites are only located on the main island country and not on the other outer islands of the Republic of Mauritius.

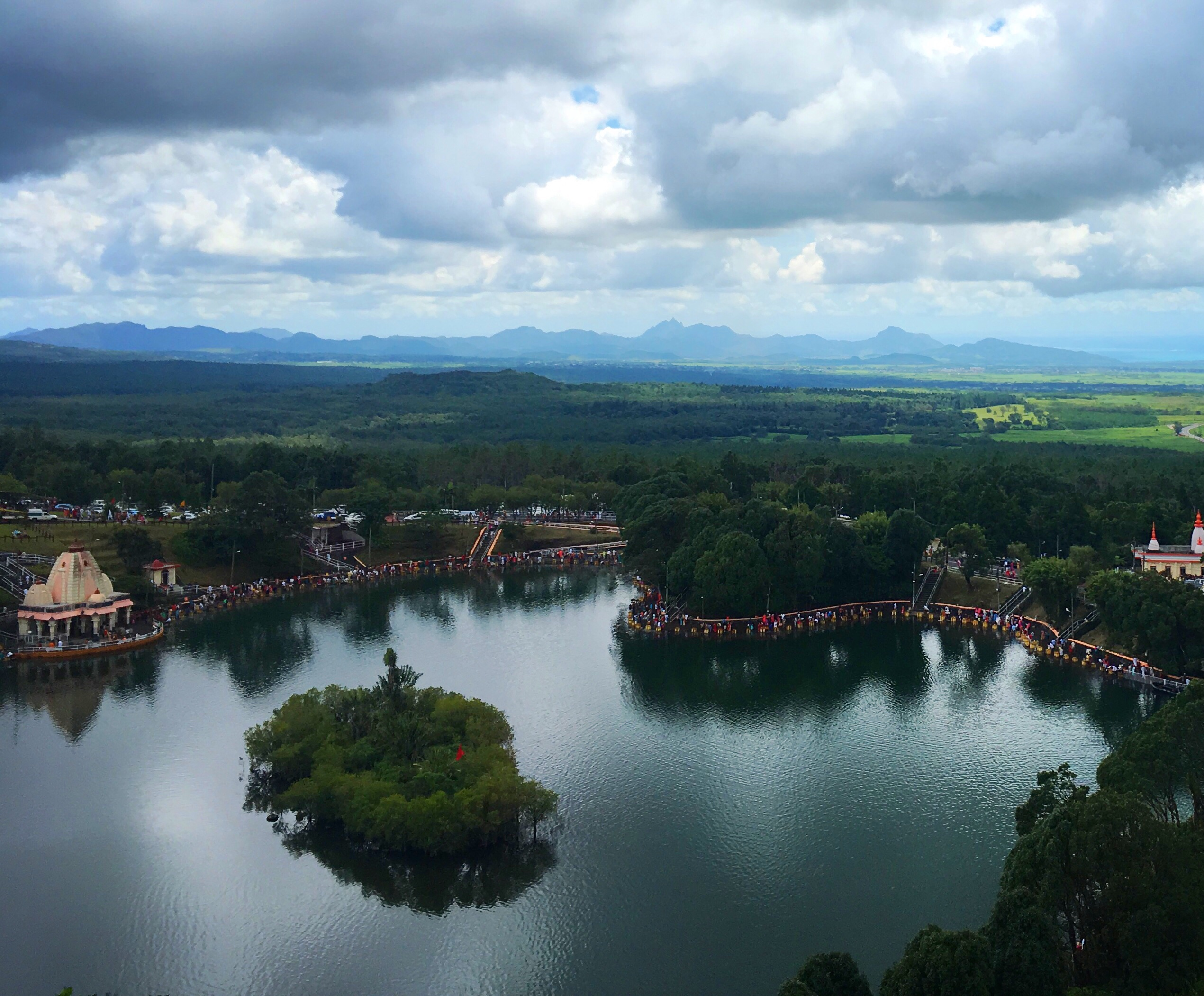
Ganga Talao (Grand Bassin), Savanne

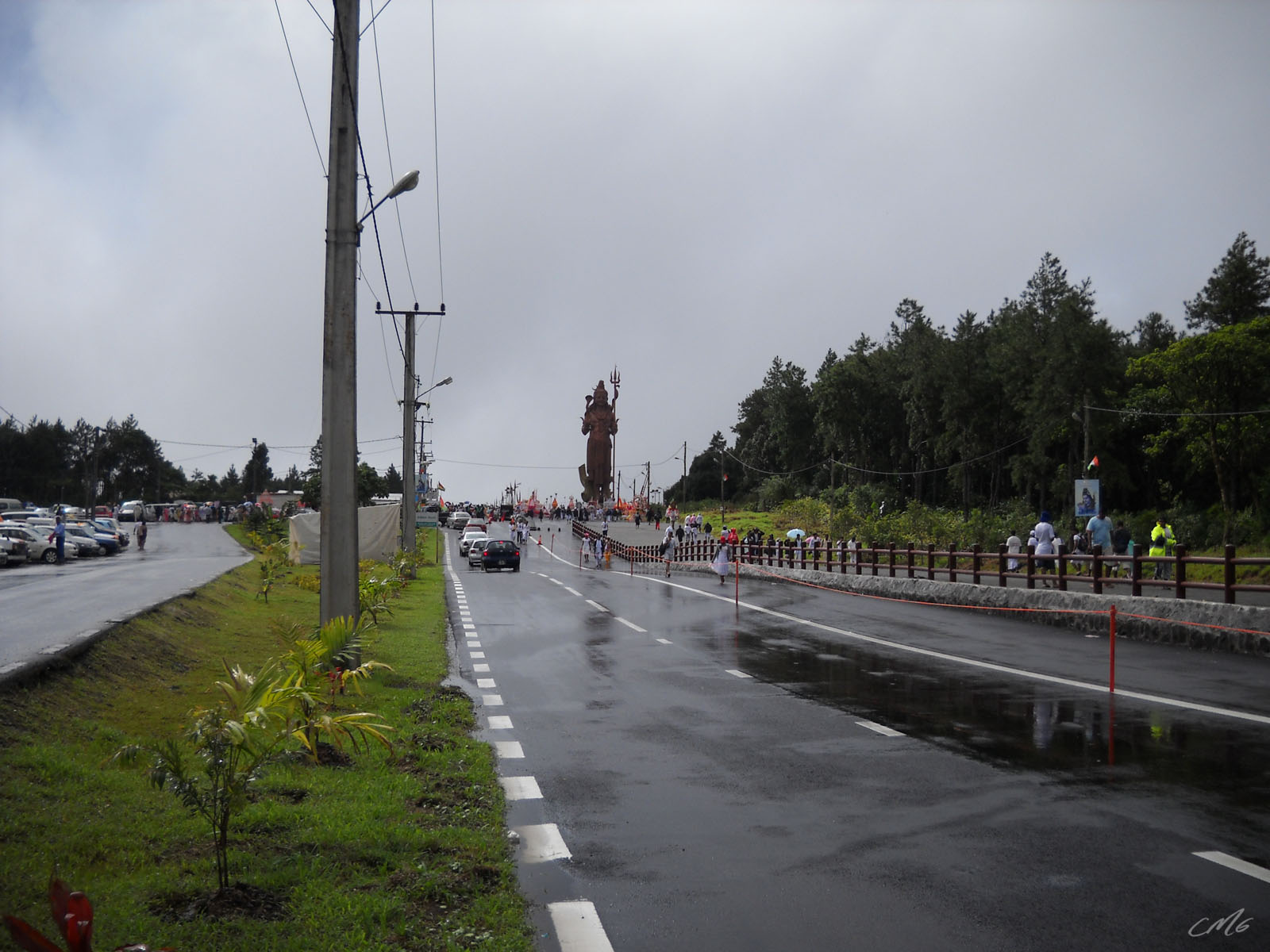
Mangal Mahadev, Savanne

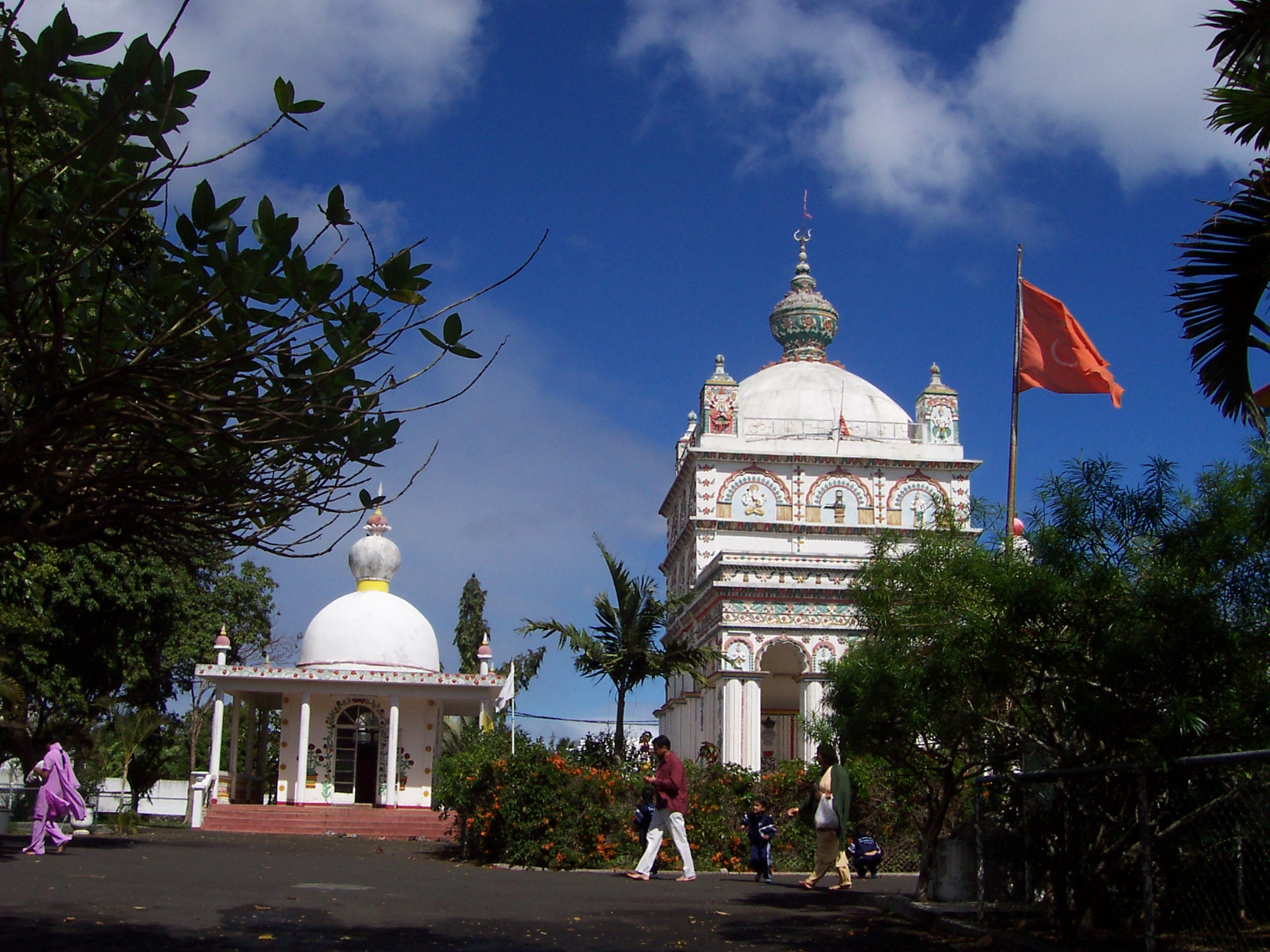
Maheswarnath Mandir, Triolet

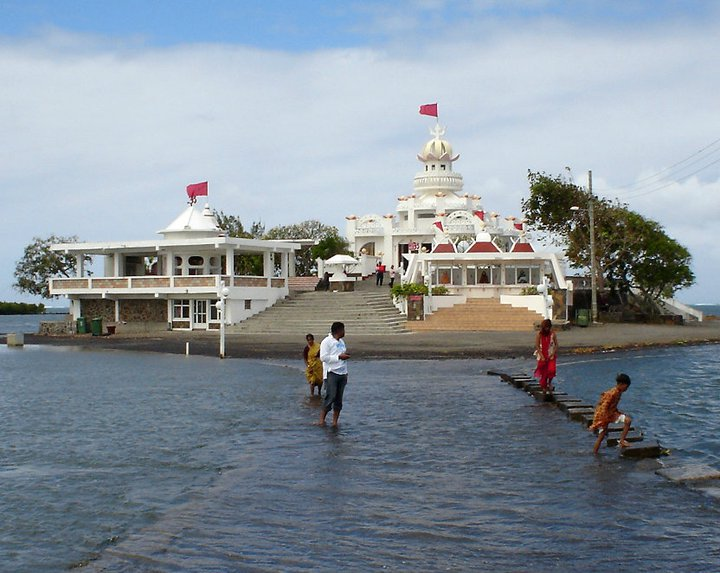
Sagar Shiv Mandir, Poste de Flacq

- Ganga Talao (Grand Bassin) together with Mangal Mahadev statue in Savanne district
- Maheswarnath Mandir, Triolet
- Sagar Shiv Mandir, Poste de Flacq

== Trinidad and Tobago ==
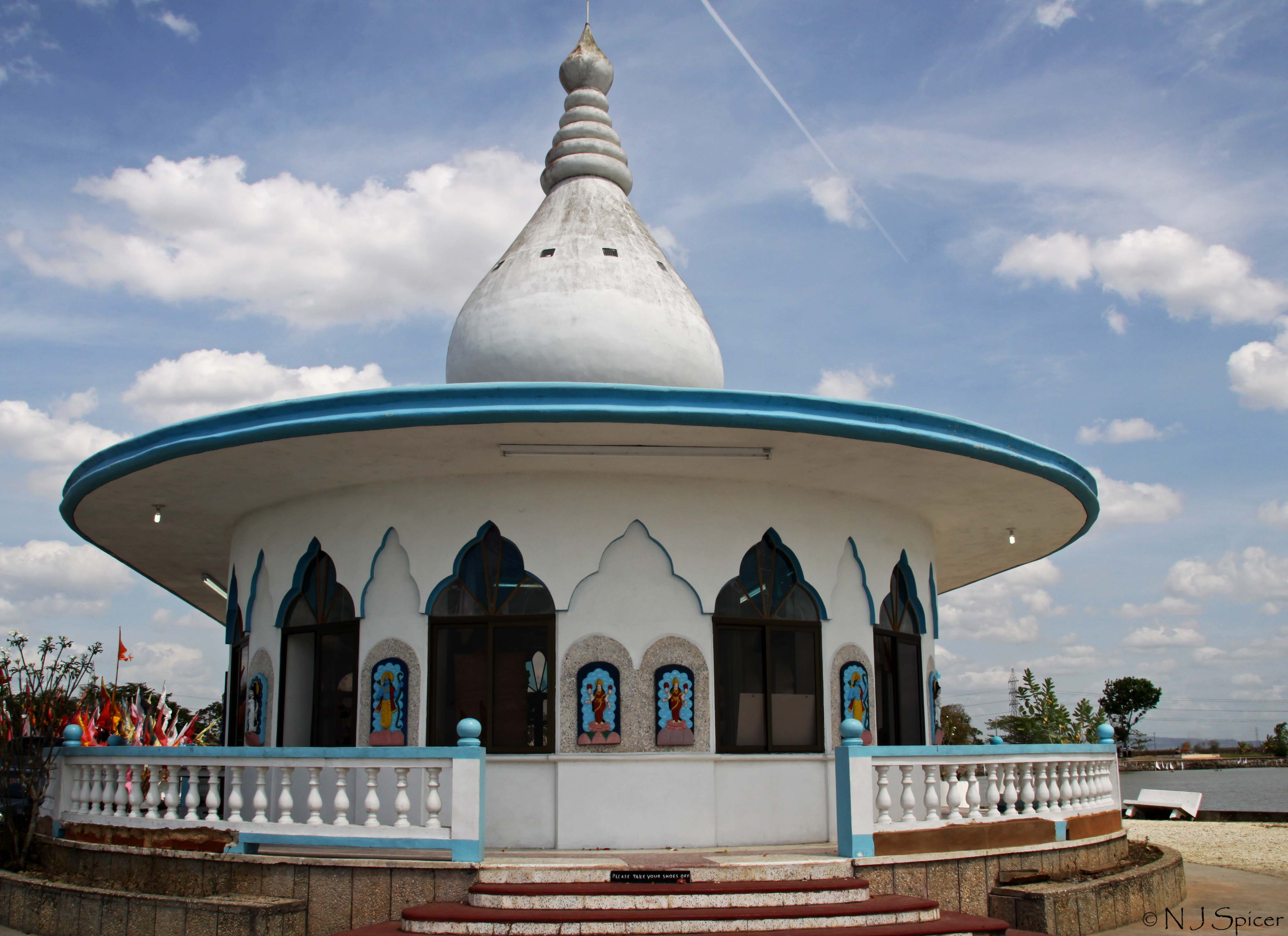
Waterloo Temple, Trinidad

- Temple in the Sea, Waterloo Road, Waterloo, Carapichaima, Couva–Tabaquite–Talparo
- Dattatreya Mandir and 85-foot Karyasiddhi Hanuman Murti, Datta Drive, Orangefield, Carapichaima, Couva–Tabaquite–Talparo
- Shiva Lingam Mandir, Patiram Trace, Penal, Penal-Debe
- Ganga Dhara festival at the Trinnaadeeshwar Mahadeo Ghat, Kailash Ghat, Hanuman Ghat, Tulsidas Ghat, Ardha Naareshvar Ghat, and Mundan Sanskaar Ghat at Marianne River Blanchisseuse, Tunapuna-Piarco
- Siapria Mai (La Divina Pastora) Church, La Pastora Street, Siparia, Siparia region
- Exchange Village Shiv Mandir, Brickfield Road Exchange Village, Couva, Couva–Tabaquite–Talparo
- Moose Bhagat Mandir, Naparima Mayaro Road Mairad Village, Tableland, Princes Town
- Shiva Mandir, 1 Railway Road Reform Village, Gasparillo, Princes Town
- Balka Devi Mandir (Mud Volcano Temple), St. Marie Road, Cedros, Siparia
- Shree Pavan Putra Hanuman Shiv Shakti Mandir Cunjal Road, Cunjal, Princes Town
- Triveni Mandir, Sisters Road, Hardbargain Village, Williamsville, Princes Town

== Suriname ==
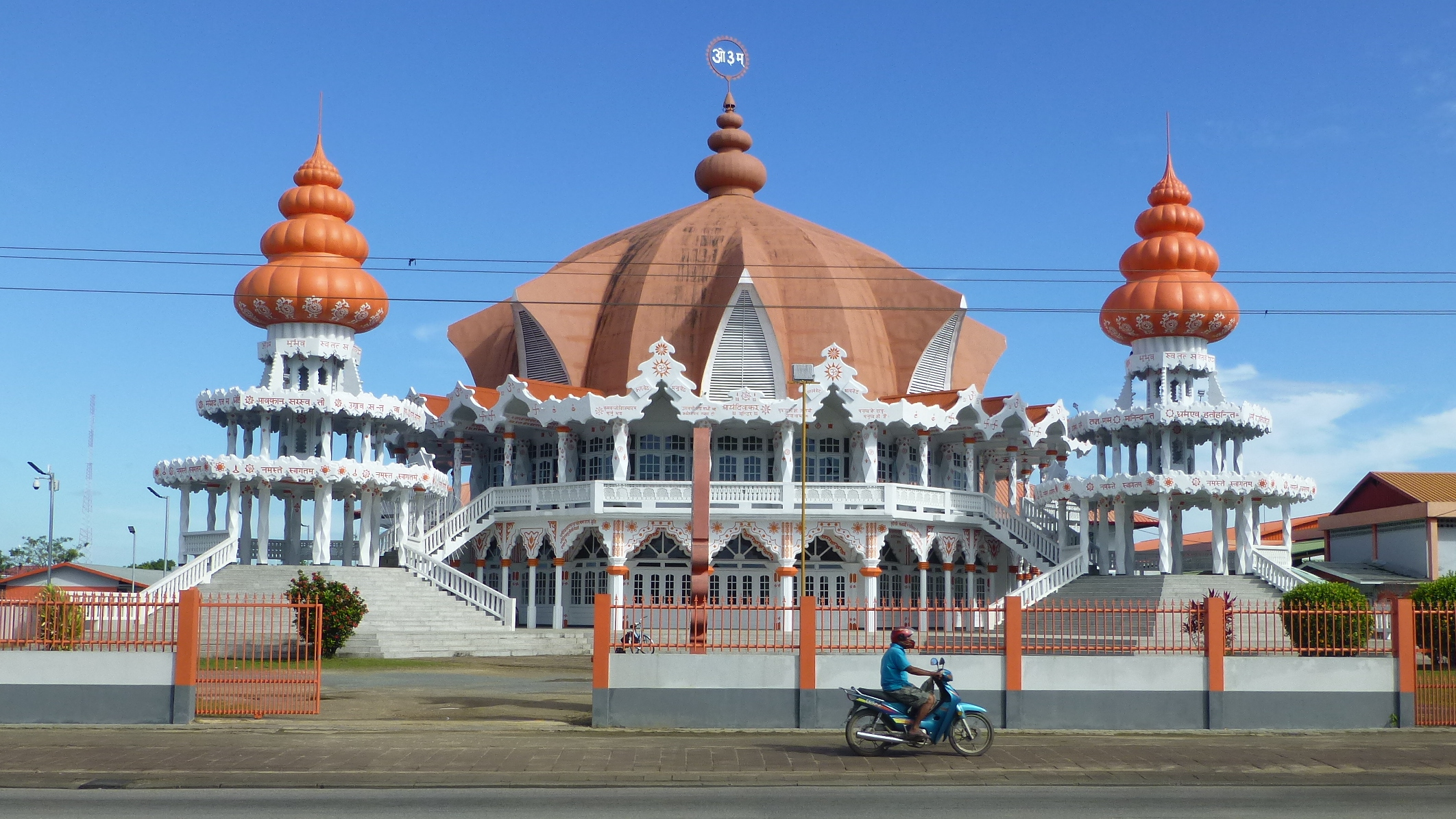
The exterior of the Arya Diwaker temple

- Arya Diwaker Mandir

== Pakistan ==
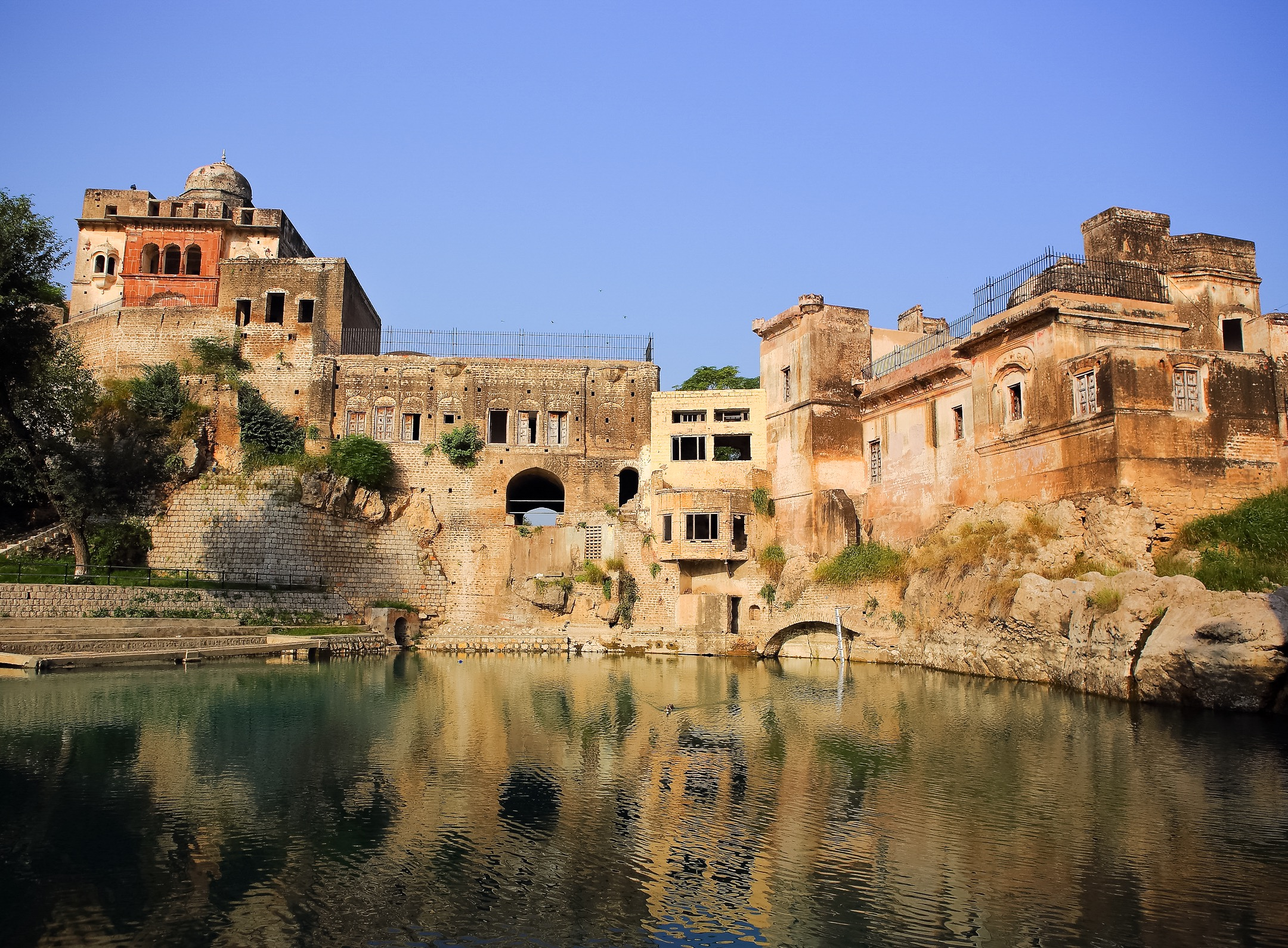
Katas Raj Temples are said to date from the times of the Mahabharata.

- Hinglaj Mata Temple – A Shakthi Peeth in Pakistan's Balochistan pilgrimage. The annual Hinglaj Yatra is the largest Hindu pilgrimage in Pakistan attended by about 300,000 people.
- Ramapir Temple at Tando Allahyar in Sindh. The Annual Ramapir Mela festival is the second largest Hindu pilgrimage in Pakistan.
- Katasraj temple – Site of a famous temple which has a lake that is said to have been created from the teardrops of Shiva. Also known for being home of the Pandava brothers during part of their exile.
- Sharada Peeth – An abandoned Shakta pitha
- Umerkot Shiv temple- Famous for Shivrathri festival attended by 250,000 people.
- Shrine of Lal Shahbaz Qalandar – Sufi shrine that is important to Sindhi Hindus
- Tilla Jogian – ancient shrine reportedly over 2,000 years old.
- Chandragup
- Amb Temples
- Churrio Jabal Durga Mata Temple
- Kalat Kali Temple
- Goraknath Temple
- Kalibari Mandir, Peshawar

== Nepal ==
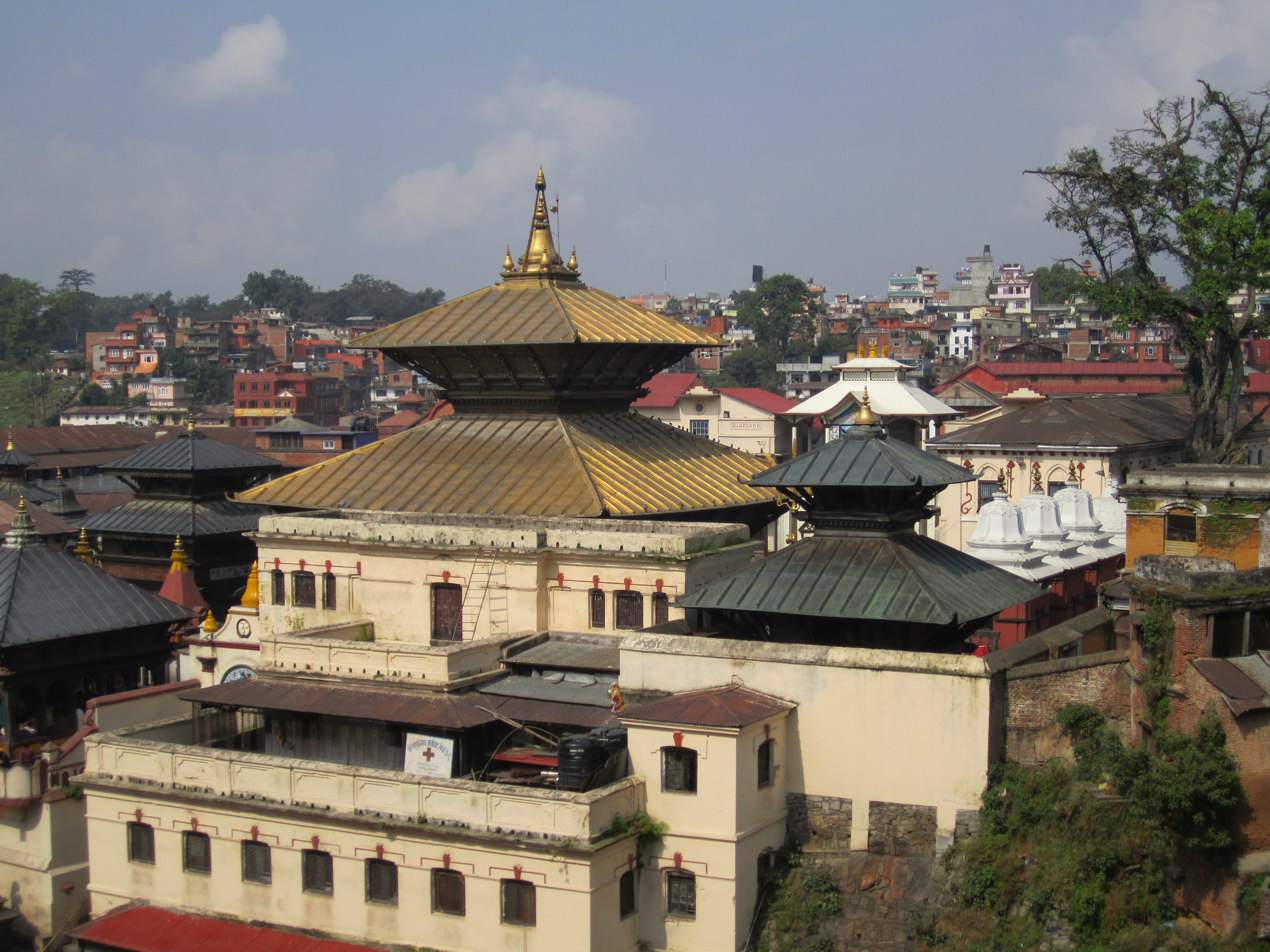
A view of Pashupatinath Temple

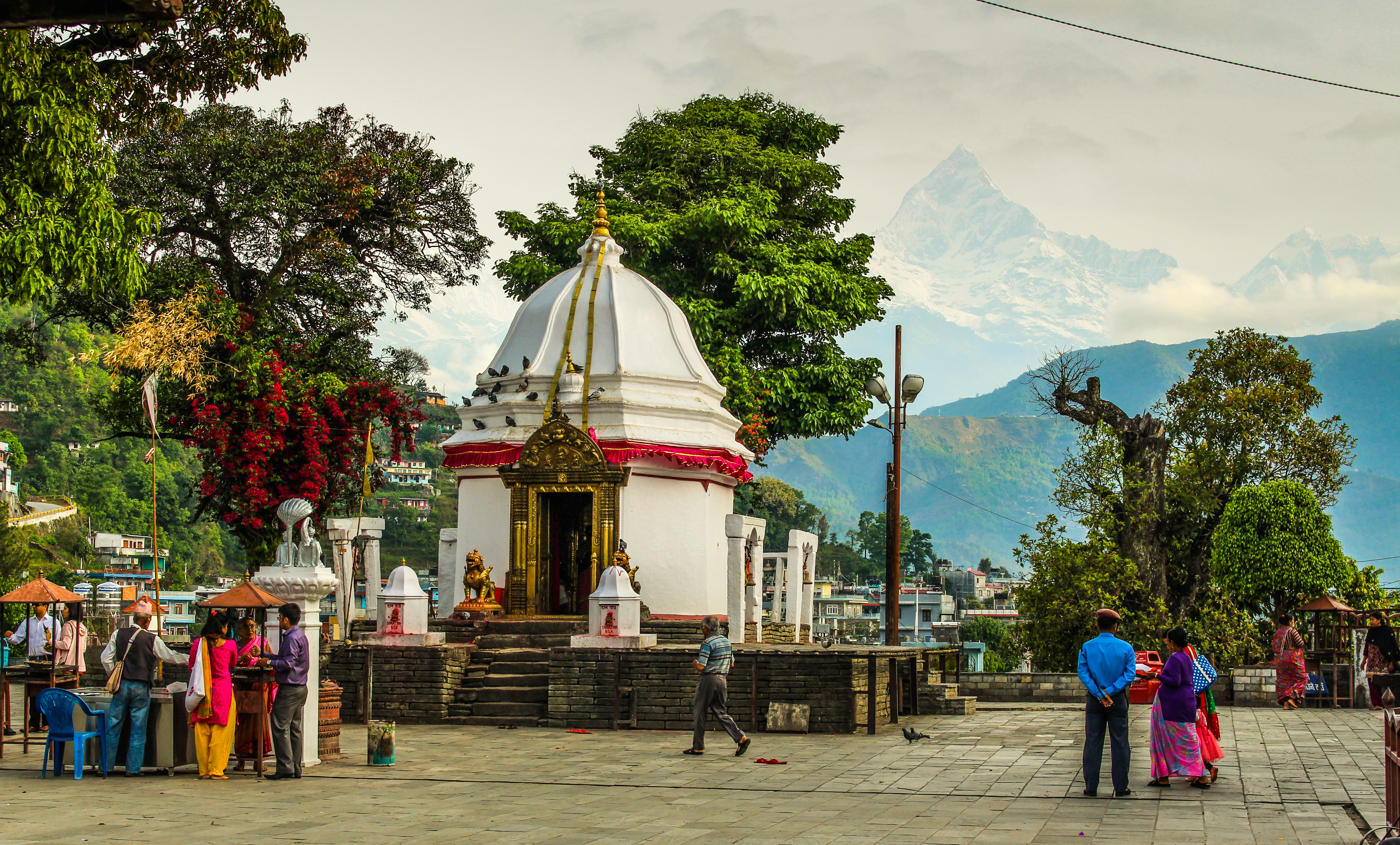
Bindhyabasini Temple, Pokhara, Nepal

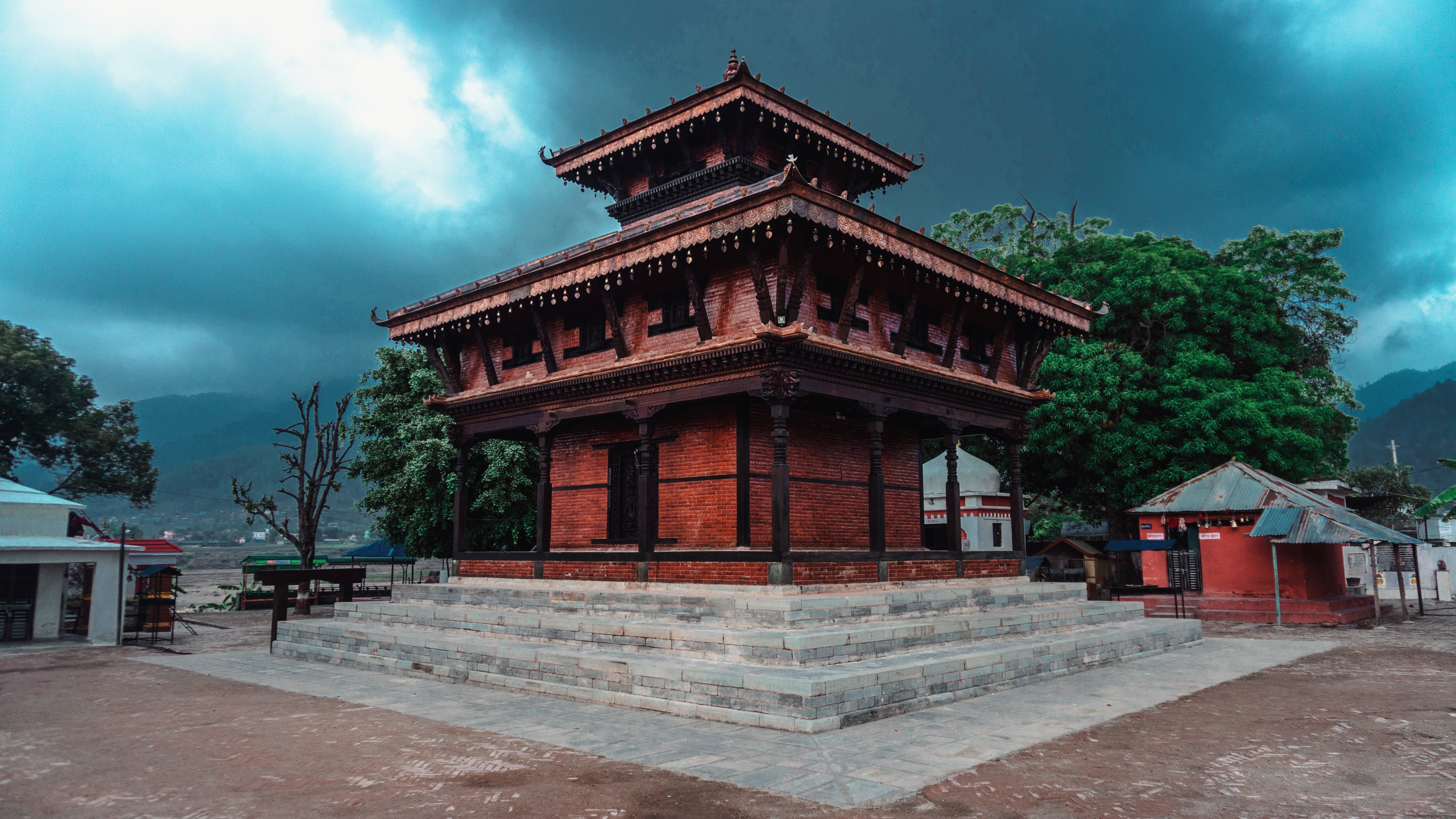
Ambikeshwari Temple is a Shakta pitha which is supposed to have emerged due to the falling of right ear of Satidevi according to the Swasthani Purana.

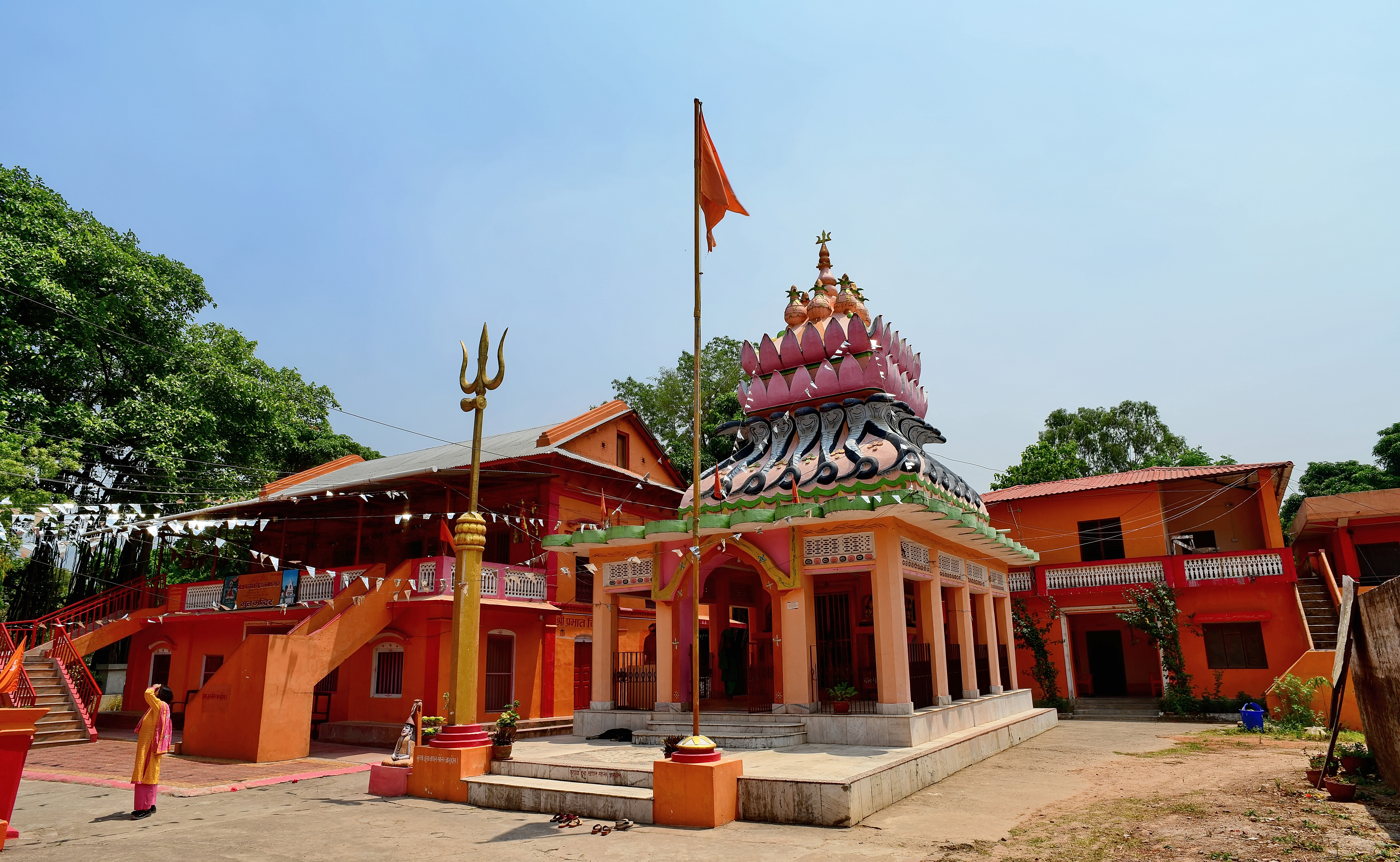
The Dang Valley remained a pilgrim place for disciples of mahasiddha Gorakhnath for over 1300 years in the Indian sub-continent

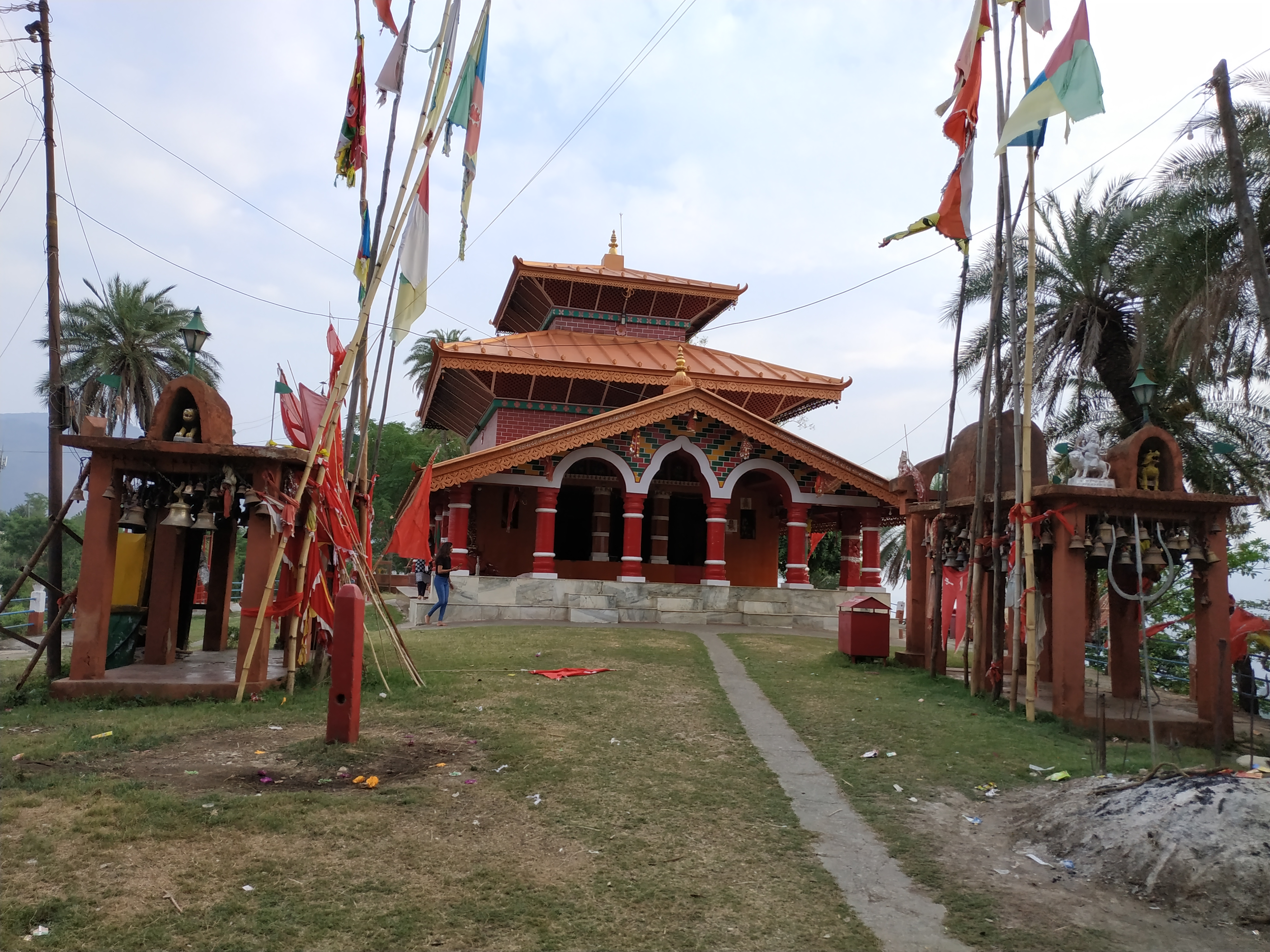
Tripura Sundari Temple, Nepal

- Barahachhetra
- Janakpurdham
- Muktinath
- Pashupatinath Temple
- Changu Narayan Temple
- Buddhanilkantha
- Krishna Temple of Patan Durbar Square
- Rishikesh Complex of Ruru Kshetra
- Vyas cave
- Doleshwor Mahadev (considered the head part of Kedarnath temple of India)
- Dolakha Bhimsen temple
- Pathibhara Devi temple
- Halesi Mahadev Temple and Halesi-Maratika Caves
- Tripura Sundari Temple, Nepal

== China ==
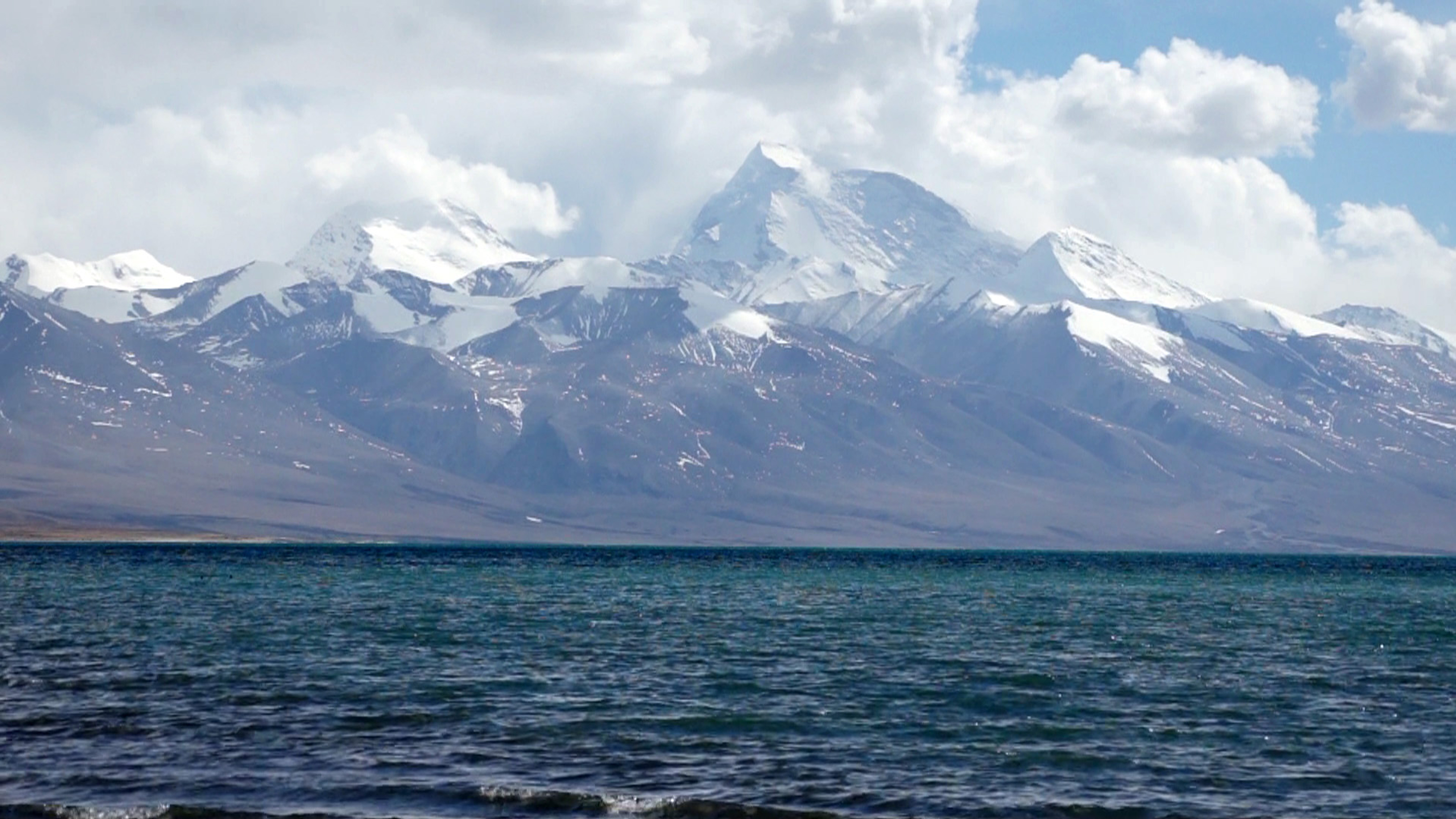
Lake Manasarovar

- Mount Kailash
- Lake Manasarovar

== Bangladesh ==
- Chandranath Temple
- Chatteshwari Temple
- Langalbandh
- Orakandi Thakur Bari
- Sindurmati Tirthadham
- Sugandha Shakta pitha

== Indonesia ==
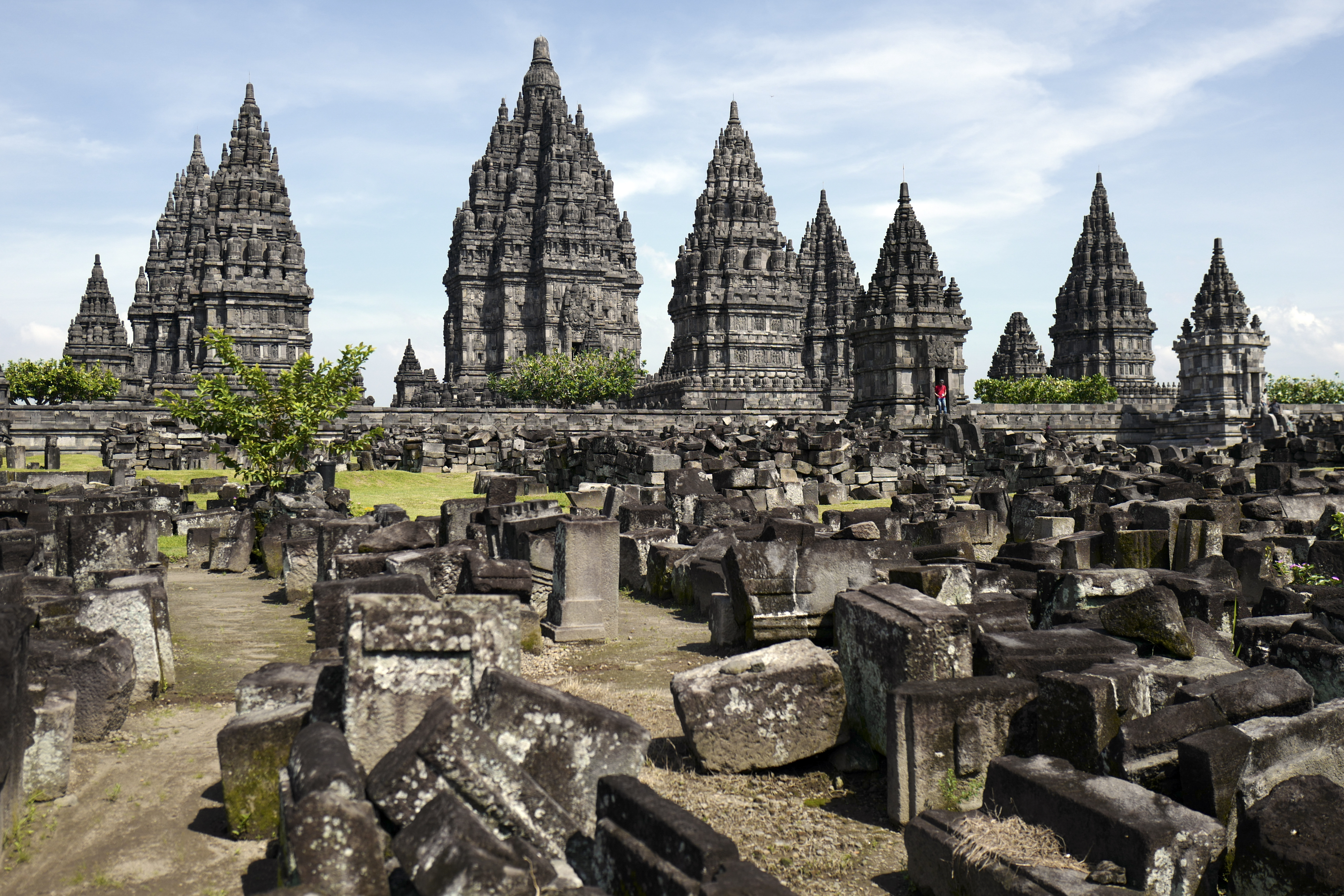
Prambanan

- Mother Temple of Besakih
- Prambanan
- Mount Bromo

== Cambodia ==
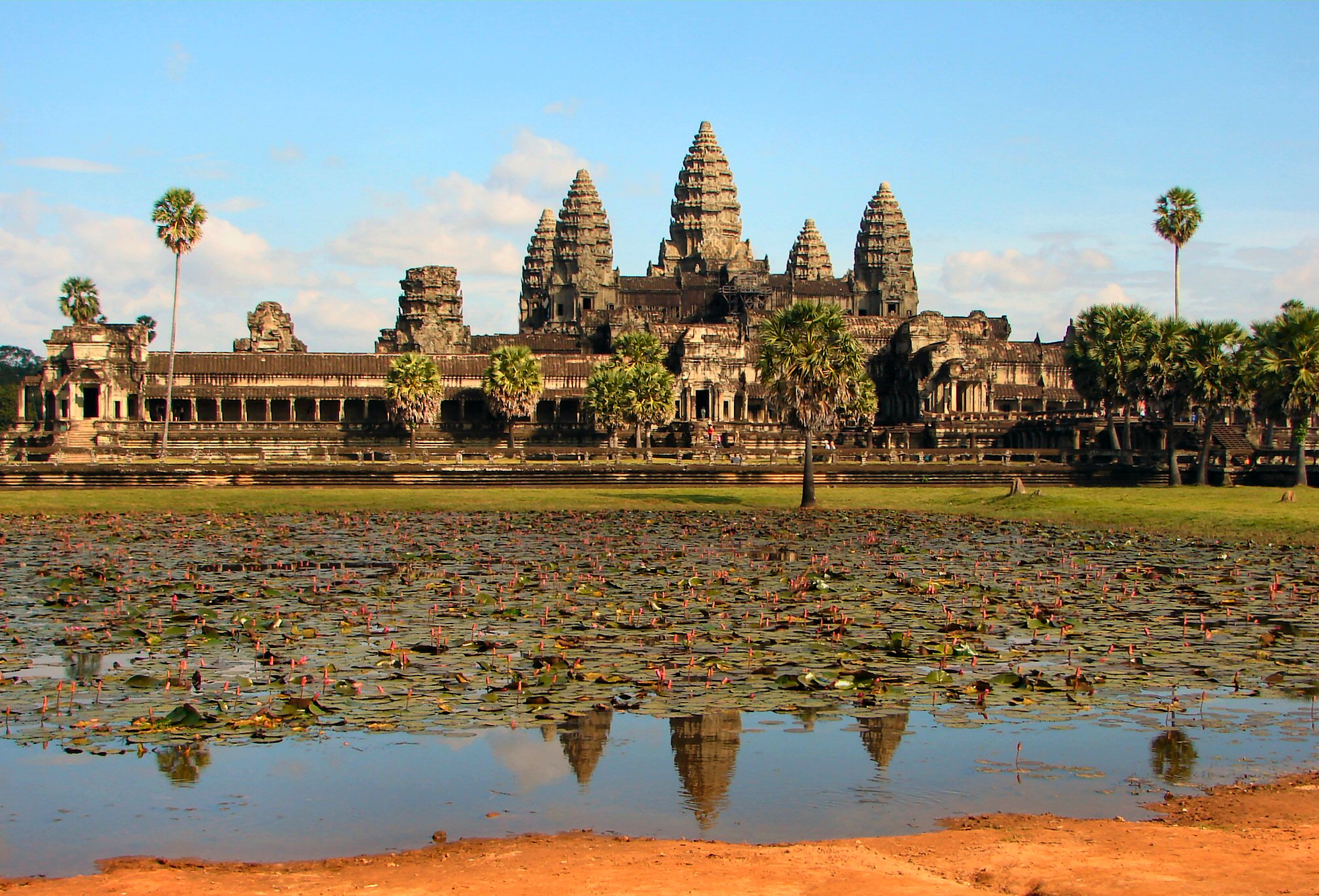
Angkor Wat

- Preah Vihear
- Angkor Wat

== Malaysia ==
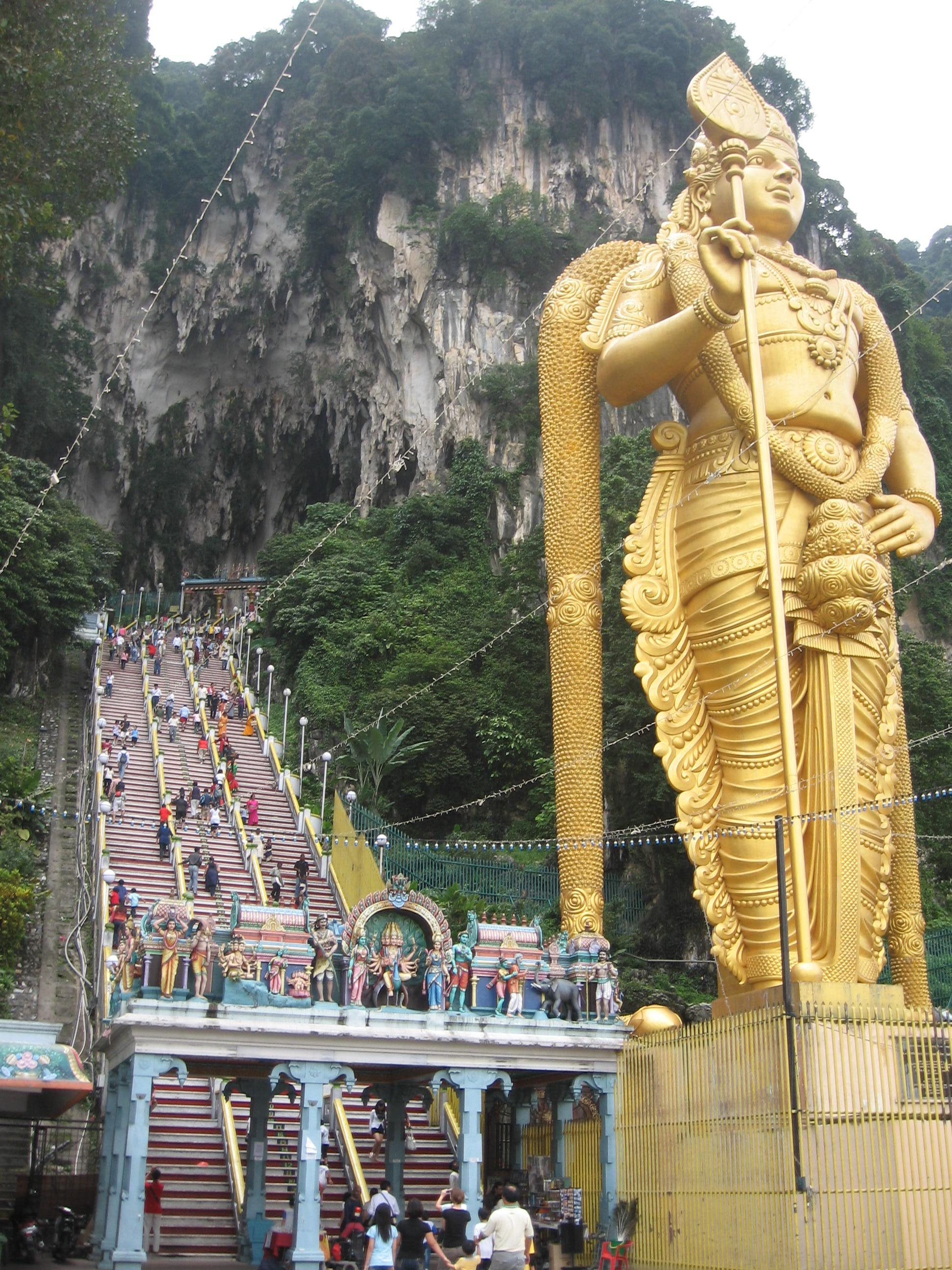
Batu Caves

- Batu Caves
- Arulmigu Balathandayuthapani Temple, Penang

== United States ==
- Vivekananda Cottage, Thousand Island Park, Jefferson County, New York - The cottage where Swami Vivekananda stayed in 1895.

== See also ==
- Hindu pilgrimage sites in India
- List of Hindu temples
