= Guruchand Thakur =

Indian reformer

- গুরুচাঁদ ঠাকুর (Bengali)
- Born: c. 13 March 1846; Orakandi Village, Gopalganj District, Bengal Presidency, British India
- Died: 27 September 1936 (aged 90)
- Occupations: Social and religious reformer
- Known for: Upliftment of Namasudra Community(Then known as Chandals)

Guruchand Thakur (গুরুচাঁদ ঠাকুর) (also known as Sri Sri Guruchand Thakur) (1846-1937) was an Indian reformer who worked for the upliftment of the untouchable peoples in the Indian society. He led the Matua sect of Hindus after the death of his father Harichand Thakur. Under his strong leadership, the Matua section achieved a major organizational push and started the Namasudra protest movement (also known as the Matua Movement or Namashudra Movement) in 1872. He established many schools for the upliftment of the Dalit community. He preached the abolition of caste inequality, gender equality via performing secular duties. Matua Movement is one of the first Dalit uprisings in the Indian subcontinent.

== Life ==
Guruchand Thakur was born in Gopalganj District, Bengal Presidency, British India. He was the son of Harichand Thakur (Father) and Shanti Devi (Mother). His father Harichand Thakur whose ancestors were traditional Vaishnavites (Gaudiya Vaishnavism sect) from Rarhdesh (described in 'Sri Sri Harililamrita ") was a great social reformer and founder of Matua Community. He took his formal education in the house of Dasharath Biswas at Padmavila village when he was just seven years old. After completion of the education in Dasharath Biswas's house, he went to one of the devotees of Harichand Thakur, named Golok Kirtaniya (resident of Molla Kandhi village), for further education. He completed three years of primary education in this way. Even he was interested to continue his study further, he was not able to take admission in any educational institute as there was no right for education for the lower cast people at that time. He was deeply hurt by this event. He came back to his native village Orakandhi and took admission to a Moktab for further continuation of his study. He studied Arabic and Persian languages for twelve years and also took religious education from his father. He married Satyavama Devi at the age of fourteen. He received education on domestic life, society, religion, politics, economics from his parents until the age of twenty. Finally, he devoted his life to the betterment of his Matua community following the order of his parents.

== Social Reforms ==
Guruchand Thakur along with his father Harichand Thakur played an important role in the Chandal or Namashudra movement of 1872-73. In this movement, Chandals protested against the oppression and exploitation of them by upper castes. In 1873, Chandals held a general strike and decided not to serve any higher caste people unless they got a dignified position in Hindu society. This is the first general strike (Dalit uprisings) officially recorded and recognized in the Indian subcontinent. Some historians also consider this movement as a social boycott of the higher castes. They also demanded the upliftment of their society through educational endeavors. However, upper caste peoples of that time were strongly against the education of lower-class people.

He understood the importance of education through the experience of his own life. He realized that only education can uplift the downtrodden Dalit society, can bring the desired equality between different castes. Education is the primary condition for fulfilling the aim of building a classless and casteless society. At that time, people from the lower caste had no right for education. Being illiterate and lack of educational opportunities make these downtrodden sections unaware of their own rights. The Bengali intellectual class of that time was also bound by the rigidity of the caste system, despite their western education which teaches about humanism, enlightenment, and science. In this situation, he started the education movement among the downtrodden sections of Bengal society.The primary demand of this movement was Education for All. His famous quote is "ছেলে মেয়ে দিতে শিক্ষা/প্রয়োজনে করো ভিক্ষা"( for giving education of boys and girls - begs if necessary). He told parents even to beg for the education of their children. This movement gradually became a social awakening movement (liberation movement) for these downtrodden societies.

In 1880, he first established a Pathsala in his native village Orakandi exclusively for the education of Namashudra children. According to Sekhar Bandyopadhyay, this was the first step towards the spread of education among Dalits. In 1881, he became the president of the first assembly of Namashudras. After that first assembly meeting, religious persons started to establish schools instead of temples. Many village committees were established under his leadership for the promotion of education. These village committees also established many schools in their respective locality. He also took help from an Australian missionary Dr. C.S. Mead for the social and educational development of these downtrodden societies. With the help of Dr. C.S. Mead, he also tried to increase the awareness regarding basic needs like health check-ups, environmental awareness, etc. among the Namashudras. In 1907, he established a higher English medium school, named Dr. C.S. Mead School, in his native village.

He also understood the importance of women's education. In the Vedic period of India, men and women had equal opportunities for education. However, this flow had stopped during the medieval period by the name of Pardah System. Pardah System basically means women can not go in front of other men except their husbands without covering their faces. This system was most prevalent in upper-class society. Most of the women's of the lower class society had to go outside for daily earning; thus Pardah System did not exist in that society. However, education was just a dream for most of the girls of that time. Women's also had to suffer much in their family life due to lack of any education. He understood these problems of women and tried to find a solution through women's education. He realized that only educated women can balance their married life in a rational way and provide a healthy educational atmosphere to their children at home. He understood that only educated women can engage themselves in various avenues of social and economic development. He established many girl's schools for the spreading of women's education. Under his guidance, the Widow Remarriage system was also introduced in the Namashudra community in 1909. He also instructed his followers to stand against the dowry system and not to take any dowry in marriage.

In 1907, He submitted a memorandum to the Bengal government demanding the upper cast status for the lower class of Hindu Chandal society. Starting from 1901, many Hindu cast sections sent representations to the Bengal government demanding a name change and a higher status. In 1911, the government turned down all these demands except two- one of these were of Chandals, who were renamed as Namashudra. People from the Chandal community started calling themselves Namashudra and profess to be Vaishnav.

He realized that political, economical, and moral standards had to be raised for the upliftment of the poor Namashudra community. He understood the necessity of government help for the upliftment of the Namashudra community. He requested to Bengal government for reservation for the Namashudras in the field of government jobs. By his serious effort, Reservation was introduced for Namashudras in the field of education, government employment, and representation in politics. In 1909, A list of 31 disadvantaged classes was prepared in the Bengal province and Reservation was extended to them for their economic and social upliftment. These disadvantaged classes are renamed together as a Scheduled Caste. However, only Bengal province had this Reservation system; no other state in India had such a system. Later in 1919, Reservation was introduced in all other provinces of India under the Montague-Chemsford Act of 1919.

== Legacy ==
As of now, Matua Mahasangha is one of the leading organizations that is working for the upliftment of the Bengali Dalit community residing in India and Bangladesh. Matua section constitutes 15% of the overall population in the state of West Bengal. Recently, the West Bengal government has established a university, named Harichand Guruchand University, for the higher education of Matua community.

== See also ==
- Harichand Thakur
