= Jogendra Nath Mandal =

Bengali politician and Dalit leader (1904–1968)

- যোগেন্দ্রনাথ মন্ডল
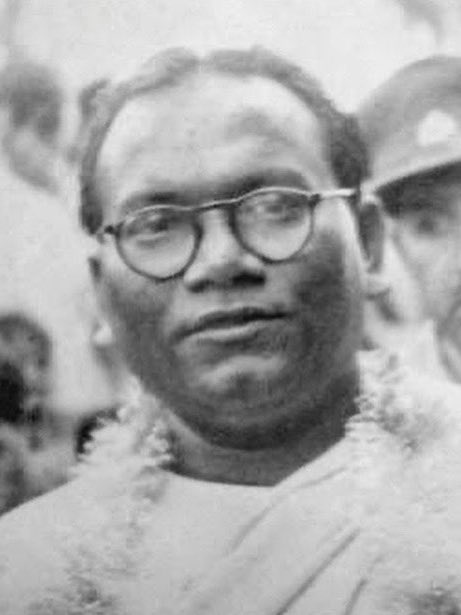
- Mandal c. 1940

Minister for Law and Justice, Government of Pakistan
- In office 15 August 1947 – 8 October 1950
- Monarch: George VI
- Governors General: Muhammad Ali Jinnah; Khawaja Nazimuddin
- Prime Minister: Liaquat Ali Khan
- Preceded by: position established

Ministry of Labour, Government of Pakistan
- In office 15 August 1947 – 8 October 1950
- Monarch: George VI
- President: Liaquat Ali Khan
- Governors General: Muhammad Ali Jinnah; Khawaja Nazimuddin

Ministry of Commonwealth and Kashmir Affairs, Government of Pakistan
- In office 1 October 1949 – 8 October 1950
- Monarch: George VI
- Governor General: Khawaja Nazimuddin
- Prime Minister: Liaquat Ali Khan

Personal details
- Born: 29 January 1904 Barisal, Bengal, British India
- Died: 5 October 1968 (aged 64) Bangaon, West Bengal, India
- Citizenship: British India (1904–1947); Pakistan (1947–1950); India (1950–1968)
- Party: Muslim League
- Education: Brojomohun College, Calcutta law College (University of Calcutta)
- Occupation: Politician

Jogendra Nath Mandal (Bengali: যোগেন্দ্রনাথ মন্ডল; 29 January 1904 – 5 October 1968), sometimes written Jogendranath Mandal, was a Bengali politician and Dalit leader who emerged as a prominent figure among the architects of Indian history. Within the 1946–1947 Interim Government of India, he held the portfolio of law. Distinguished as a leader representing the Scheduled Castes, Mandal vehemently opposed the 1947 partition of Bengal. His rationale rested on the apprehension that a divided Bengal would subject Dalits to the dominance of the majority-caste Hindus in West Bengal (India). Eventually opting to maintain his base in East Pakistan, Mandal aspired for the welfare of the Dalits and assumed the role of minister of law and labour in Pakistan. However, a few years after the partition, he left for India, tendering his resignation to Liaquat Ali Khan, the then-prime minister of Pakistan, citing a perceived anti-Hindu bias within the Pakistani administration.

== Early life ==
Jogendra Nath Mandal, born in the Barisal district within the erstwhile Bengal Presidency of British India (later known as East Bengal, East Pakistan, and presently Bangladesh) on 29 January 1904, hailed from the Namasudra community. Demonstrating academic aptitude from an early age, Mandal excelled in his studies. Upon graduating in 1929, he pursued legal studies, culminating in the completion of a law degree in 1934. However, he made a deliberate choice not to embark upon a legal career or conventional employment. Instead, motivated by a commitment to confront the inequities ingrained in the societal framework that marginalized his community, he opted to dedicate his life to the amelioration of the oppressed.

== Political career in India (1937–1947) ==
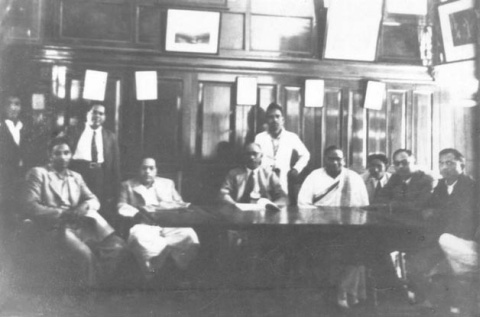
B. R. Ambedkar (front row, second from left), Jogendra Nath Mandal (front row, third from right), and others.

Mandal began his political career as an independent candidate during the 1937 Indian provincial assembly elections. He contested the Bakharganj North East Rural constituency in the Bengal legislative assembly, securing victory over Saral Kumar Dutta, the president of the district committee of the Indian National Congress (INC).

During this period, Mandal found inspiration in figures such as Subhas Chandra Bose and Sarat Chandra Bose. Following Subhas Chandra Bose's expulsion from the INC in 1940, Mandal aligned himself with the Muslim League (ML), the only other prominent national party at the time. Subsequently, he assumed a ministerial role in the cabinet of ML chief minister Huseyn Shaheed Suhrawardy.

Mandal collaborated with B. R. Ambedkar in establishing the Bengal branch of the Scheduled Castes Federation. Mandal played an important role in securing Ambedkar's election to the Constituent Assembly of Bengal in 1946.. He also contributed to the framing of the Constitution of India, with Ambedkar seeking his counsel through correspondence.

Amidst the political landscape in which the Hindu Mahasabha sought to court the Namasudra community, and the province was marked by the dominance of oppressed Dalit and Muslim populations, Mandal perceived a distinction between communal affairs and political conflicts involving the INC and ML. In the midst of the 1946 riots, he traversed East Bengal, advocating for Dalit non-participation in anti-Muslim violence. Mandal argued that Muslims, like Dalits, were oppressed by upper-caste Hindus, and he believed that aligning with Muslims would be more beneficial for the Dalits than associating with high-caste Hindus. Consequently, he lent his support to the ML.

Upon the ML's integration into the Interim Government of India in October 1946, Muhammad Ali Jinnah nominated Mandal as one of the League's five representatives. Subsequently appointed by King George VI, Mandal assumed the law portfolio within the body.

== Political career in Pakistan (1947–1950) ==
Mandal emerged as one of the 96 founding figures of the Dominion of Pakistan, aligning himself with the Muslim League. During their inaugural session, which transpired shortly before the partition of India on 15 August 1947, he was elected as their interim chairman. Notably, as Jinnah prepared to assume the role of the first Governor-General of Pakistan, he entrusted Mandal with the responsibility of presiding over the session, underscoring his confidence in him. Mandal was subsequently appointed Pakistan's inaugural minister for law and labour.

Mandal's tenure in this position was truncated due to persistent subjugation within a bureaucracy dominated by a Muslim majority. The situation deteriorated further following Jinnah's death in September 1948. Confronted with atrocities committed against his constituents, the Dalits, by Muslim rioters supported by the police, Mandal voiced his protest. This stance led to discord between him and the prime minister of Pakistan, Liaquat Ali Khan.

== Return to India and death (1950–1968) ==
In 1950, Mandal found himself compelled to return to India, a decision precipitated by an outstanding arrest warrant against him in Pakistan.

Upon his return to India, Mandal encountered a lack of acceptance by any political party. Nevertheless, he persevered in his endeavours to aid the rehabilitation of Hindu refugees from East Pakistan (present-day Bangladesh), whose influx was rapidly impacting West Bengal. He died on 5 October 1968 in Bangaon, under mysterious circumstances.
