= Harichand Thakur =

Founder of Matua sect of Hindus

- হরিচাঁদ ঠাকুর
- Born: c. 11 March 1812; Safaladangagram, Gopalganj, Faridpur district, Bengal Presidency, British India
- Died: 5 March 1878 (aged 65); Faridpur
- Occupations: Social and religious reformer
- Known for: Upliftment of the Namasudra community (Then known as Chandal)
- Children: Guruchand Thakur
- Relatives: Pramatha Ranjan Thakur (great-grandson)

Harichand Thakur (11 March 1812 – 5 March 1878), was a social reformer who worked among the untouchable people of the Bengal Presidency. He founded the Matua sect of Hinduism.

== Life ==
Harichand Thakur was born into a Vaishnavite Namashudra peasant family in 1811 in Safaladanga, a village in Gopalgunj, then part of the Bengal Presidency (now a part of Bangladesh). He was the son of Jashomanta Thakur (father) and Annapurna Devi (mother). His family, for generations, had belonged to the Gaudiya Vaishnavism sect; according to the book "Sri Sri Hari Lilamrita", his ancestors came from Rarhdesh. His grandfather, Manchanram Biswas, was a devout Vaishnavite known as 'Thakur Manchanram' in the locality. His father Jashomanta inherited the 'Thakur' title, and the family adopted the surname 'Thakur', abandoning their original surname 'Biswas'.

Harichand Thakur was married to Jagat Mata Shanti Mata, and they had two sons. He was evicted from his native village Orakandi through the machinations of the village zamindar and finally he became settled in another village in the same district. He did cultivation and some small trading for his daily living.

He became known in the locality as a very religious person with magical power. Because of that, many people of his community from his own village, as well as surrounding villages, came to him as a disciple. Eventually, he founded the sect of Vaishnavite Hinduism called Matua. He did not promote asceticism, preaching instead that men could be devoted to God while staying within the family (Grihete thakiya jar hay bhaboday. Sei je param sadhu janio nishchay).

Harichand Thakur died in 1878, in Faridpur.

== Social and religious reforms ==
People started gathering around him because of his religious nature as well as his miraculous power well known in the nearby locality. According to historian Sekhar Bandyopadhyay, one day Thakur "experienced atma darshan or self-revelation, through which he realized that he was the incarnation of God himself, born in this world to bring salvation to the downtrodden". After that he started preaching his own religious realization which is only based on Bhakti. According to his doctrine, all traditional rituals, except devotion to God, faith in mankind, and love for living beings, are meaningless and distortions from the real aim of attaining God. During that time, lower-caste peoples in India were terribly oppressed and marginalized by the upper-caste people (mostly belong to the Vaishnav or Hindu Brahmin religions). These downtrodden people did not have any right in anything. His simple doctrine attracted many adherents from his own marginalized community. However, higher caste Hindus and Vaishnavs distanced themselves from his religion. He organized these downtrodden peoples of his own community under the banner of his new religious doctrine (known as Matua religion) and established Matua Mahasangha. In one sense, he gave the religionless Namashudras a new religion, his own Matua religion and helped them to establish their own right. His followers began to believe that he was gifted with supernatural power and can protect them from the Brahmanical cruel rules and regulations in the society. They started considering him as God (Param Brahma) Harichand and as an avatar (incarnation) of Vishnu or Krishna. Thus, he became known as Sri Sri Harichand Thakur. Although he initially attracted followers only from his community, later his religion attracted followers from other caste communities that were marginalised by the upper castes, including the Chamars, Malis, and Telis.

His newly founded Matua religion is based on only three basic principles - Truth, Love, and Sanity. He completely rejected the sermons of earlier Hindu saints which described the household as an illusion and family as the main obstacle on the path of attaining salvation. Earlier Hindu saints discouraged people toward family life by preaching One has to leave home to achieve Nirvana (attaining salvation). However, he said Let karma (work) be our religion. There is no need for leaving home to lead a saintly life. He insisted that one can achieve salvation only through simple love and devotion to God. There is no need for initiation by a guru (Diksha) or pilgrimage. One can attain God by chanting Haribol and praying the God. All other mantras except the name of God and Harinam (Haribol) are just meaningless and distortions. He formulated his new Matua religion by combining the work with religion. He said haate kam mukhe nam (work in the hand and name of the God Hari in mouth). He challenged the traditional Hindu belief which described the woman as an illusion (maya), the gateway to hell, and the main obstacle on the path of attaining God. However, he insisted on strict sexual discipline and family values for his followers. According to his religion, all people are equal. He told his followers to treat everyone with the same dignity.

He gave twelve instructions to his followers. These twelve instructions are: (I) Always speak the truth (II) Treat the woman as your mother-being; Respect the woman (III) Always respect your parents (IV) Treat your neighbors and all earthly living beings with love, pity, and kindness (V) Never discriminate on racial grounds (VI) Bring all the six passions of the mind under your control. These six passions of mind are - Lust, Anger, Greed, Infatuation, Pride, and Jealousy. (VII) Remain liberal to all other religions and creeds (VIII) Become honest in mind and activities and avoid saintly dress to adorn yourself with (IX) Perform your duties devotedly and utter the sacred Haribol and pray to God simultaneously (X) Build a temple of pure thoughts in your heart and soul and a temple of Shree Hariparameshwar at your dwelling place (XI) Pray daily to God with devotion and sanctity (XII) Sacrifice yourself to the cause of God.

== Legacy ==
After his death, one of his sons, Guruchand Thakur, himself a Chandala or avarna (born 1846), worked with C. S. Mead in a campaign to have the Chandala people recategorised as Namasudra. He established number of schools in his locality for the education of Dalit community. According to Sekhar Bandyopadhyay, it was under the leadership of Guruchand that the Matua sect "achieved its doctrinal cohesion and organisational push, as it came to be associated with the Namasudra social protest movement started in 1872".

A considerable body of Dalit literature that mixes religious and secular themes has emerged around Thakur and Matua. This includes biographies, promotions of the teachings and interpretations of the relationship to later events, such as the thoughts of B. R. Ambedkar and comparisons with the situation of black people in the US.

== See also ==
- Guruchand Thakur
- Pramatha Ranjan Thakur
