= Pramatha Ranjan Thakur =

Indian politician (1902–1990)

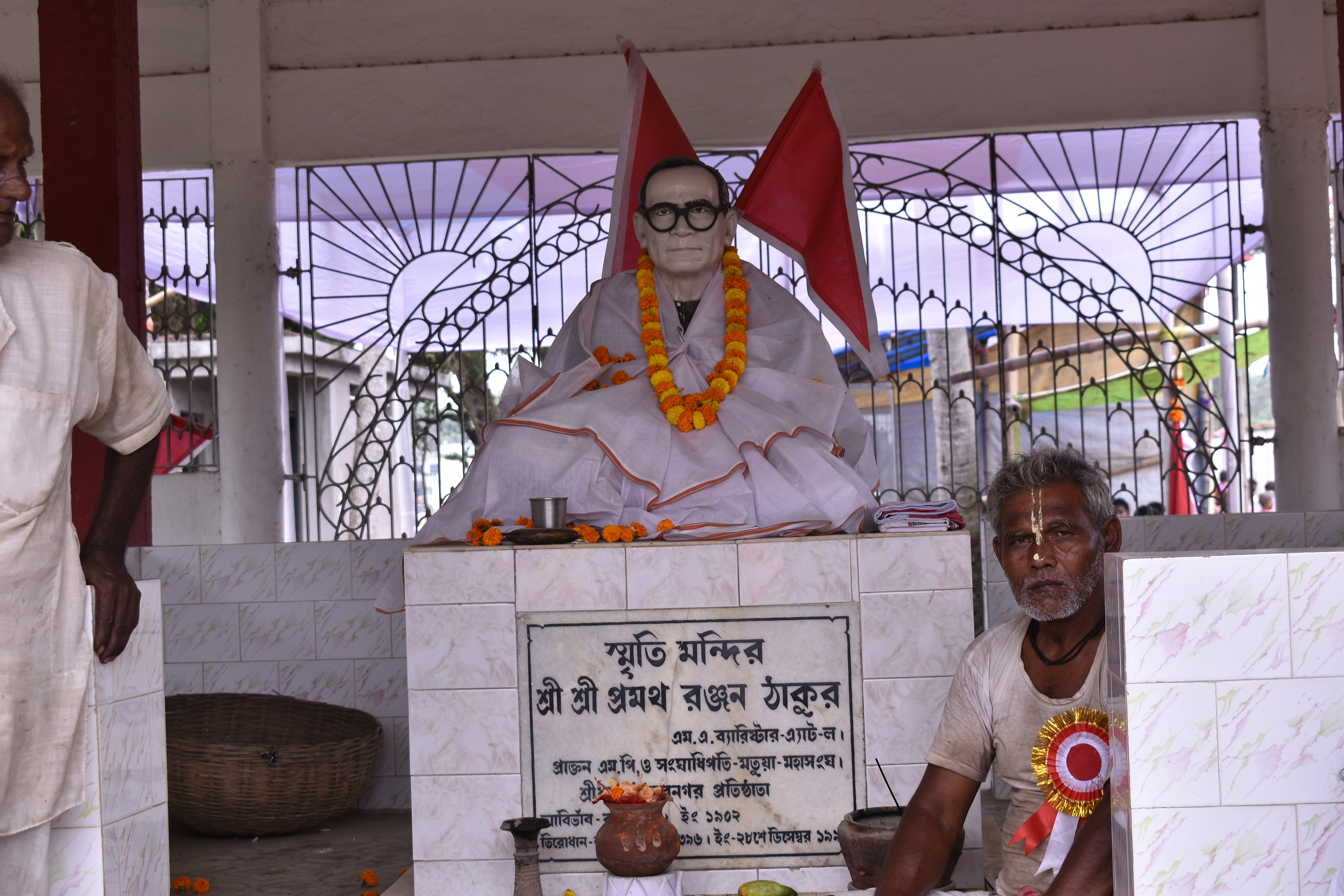
- Statue of P. R. Thakur at Thakurnagar
- Born: 1902; Orakandi, Gopalganj, Bengal Presidency, British India
- Died: 1990 (aged 87–88)
- Occupation: Political leader
- Spouse: Binapani Devi Thakur alias Boro Maa (m. 1933)

Pramatha Ranjan Thakur (1902 – 28 December 1990) was an Indian politician elected as a member of the West Bengal Legislative Assembly from the Hanskhali constituency in the 1962 elections as a candidate of the Indian National Congress, and for all his contributions, he is worshipped and is a revered figure in some social communities (which are typically backward). The seat was reserved for candidates from the Scheduled Castes.

== Early life ==
Thakur was born at village of Orakandi in Faridpur District of Bengal Presidency (now in Bangladesh). His father name is Shashi Bhushan Thakur. He passed Bar at Law from London and was called to the bar from Lincoln's Inn in June 1929. Thakur was the first barrister from the Namasudra community. In 1933, he married Binapani Devi Thakur.

== Career ==
Thakur was a prominent member of the Namasudra community, whose great-grandfather, Harichand Thakur (1811/12-1878), had founded the Hindu religious sect called Matua Mahasangha. The sect, which was further developed by Pramatha's grandfather, Guruchand Thakur, became a focal point for the Namasudra community's efforts for social upliftment and by the 1930s Pramatha had become its head. The Namasudras (a historically downtrodden community from the most lower rungs of the Hindu Caste System ) had been historically considered an untouchable community. He became the Minister of State for Tribal Development of West Bengal in 1963.
