= Mangal Mahadev =

Statue of Shiva in Savanne district, Mauritius

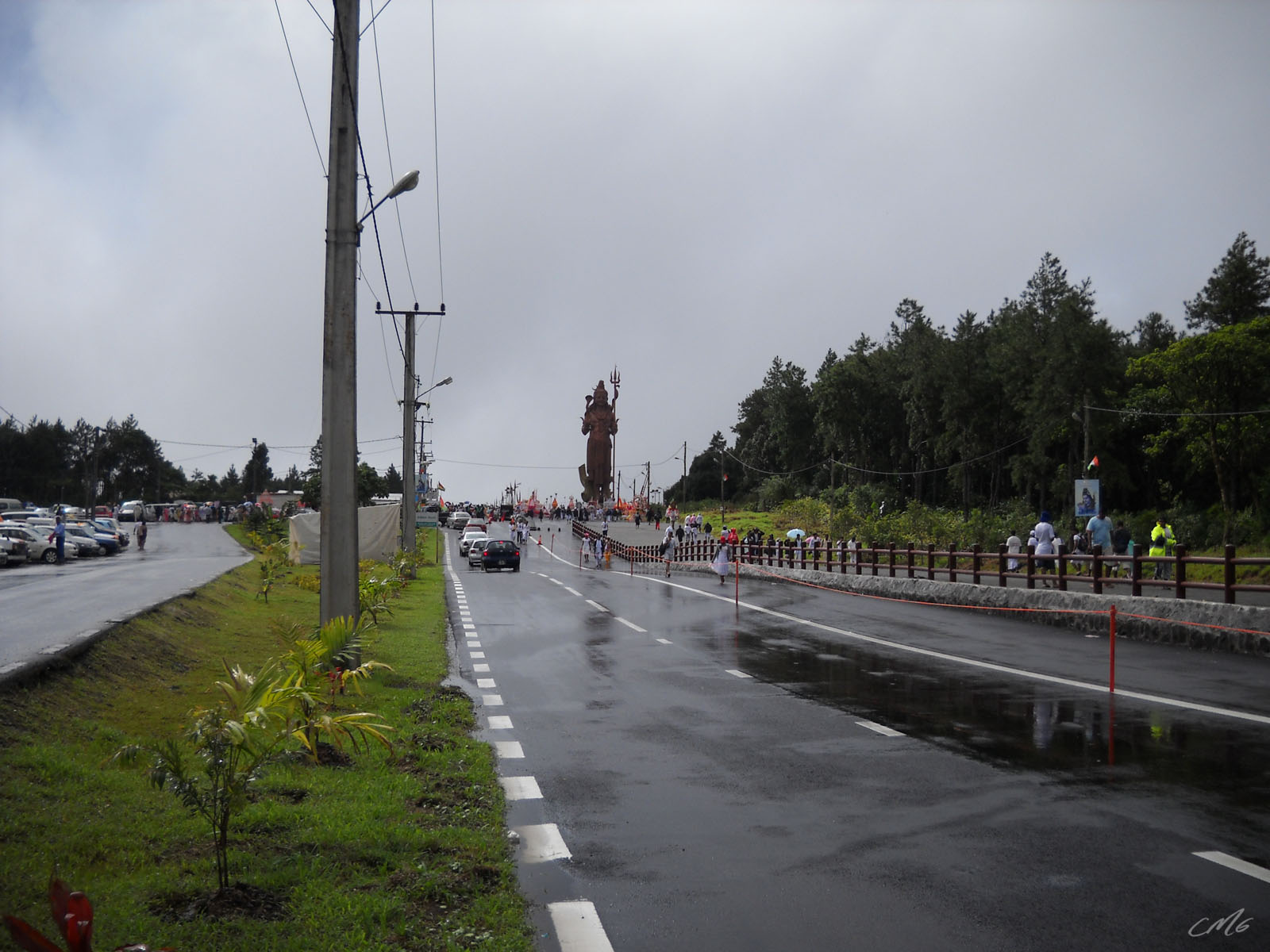
- Interactive map of Mangal Mahadev
- Location: Savanne district, Mauritius
- Coordinates: 20.41632°S 57.49245°E
- Height: 33 m (108 ft)
- Completion date: 2007
- Dedicated to: Shiva

Mangal Mahadev is a 33 m (108 ft) tall sculpture of the Hindu god Shiva standing with his Trishula (trident) at the entrance of Ganga Talao (Grand Bassin), a crater lake situated in the district of Savanne district, Mauritius. It is a replica of the Shiva statue in Sursagar lake in Vadodara, Gujarat in India and is the tallest statue in Mauritius.

== Inauguration ==
Mangal Mahadev Monument was inaugurated in 2007 and the "Sthapan" was done during the Maha Shivratri period of 2008. It is considered the most sacred Hindu place in Mauritius. There are temples dedicated to other Gods including Durga, Hanuman, Lakshmi and Ganesh around the Shiva Temple and Mangal Mahadev statue on the banks of the Grand Bassin. During Shivaratri, many pilgrims in Mauritius walk bare feet from their homes to the lake and pray at the feet of the sculpture.

== See also ==
- Hinduism in Mauritius
