= Avarna =

Communities outside the Hindu caste system

Avarna (meaning "without Varna") is a historical and sociological designation for social groups in the Indian subcontinent who were fundamentally excluded from the four-fold ritual hierarchy of the traditional Hindu Varna system.

The Varna system categorises society into four primary classes: Brahmins (priests and scholars), Kshatriyas (rulers and warriors), Vaishyas (merchants and agriculturalists), and Shudras (labourers and servants). Communities belonging to any of these four classes are collectively known as Savarna. Those outside this framework, the Avarna, were historically subjected to the institution of untouchability, enduring centuries of systemic marginalisation, socio-economic exploitation, and ritual ostracisation. Due to their exclusion from the four Varnas, these communities were often designated as the Panchama (fifth Varna).

== Origins ==
The structural exclusion of the Avarna was driven by a complex interplay of ideological, racial, and economic factors. The origin of the Avarna status is rooted in the rigid application of ritual purity laws established in ancient texts such as the Manusmriti, which codified a hierarchical four-tier Varna system and institutionalized Untouchability.

Historically, this stratification is often viewed through the lens of the conflict between the expanding Indo-Aryan social order and the indigenous Dravidian populations. As the Varna system was established, communities that resisted assimilation or maintained distinct cultural identities were pushed to the periphery. This Dravidian-Brahmin conflict resulted in the relegation of indigenous groups to the status of out-castes, effectively denying them religious and social legitimacy within the hierarchy. By branding these groups as ritually impure, the dominant classes established a permanent social barrier that preserved the supremacy of the Brahminical order.

Furthermore, the system served a vital economic purpose by ensuring a permanent supply of low-cost labour. By excluding Avarna communities from landownership, trade, and education, the social structure forced them into a state of total economic dependency. The ideology of ritual impurity provided a religious justification for this exploitation, allowing the higher Varnas to benefit from essential labour while avoiding the social and spiritual contamination associated with the work itself.

== Systematic Discrimination ==
The exclusion of Avarna people was maintained through the doctrine of untouchability, an institutionalised form of social discrimination that legitimised exclusionary and exploitative practices. This doctrine held that contact with an Avarna person, and in some regions even their proximity, would ritually pollute a Savarna individual.

A defining feature of the Avarna experience was the strict prohibition against performing any of the hereditary jobs reserved for the Savarna classes. Avarnas were barred from the priesthood and scholarship reserved for Brahmins, the governance and warfare reserved for Kshatriyas, and the trade or landownership reserved for Vaishyas. Instead, they were forced into hereditary jobs which were exclusively reserved for their communities. These occupations, often involving ritually "polluting" activities such as manual scavenging, sweeping, handling dead animals, tanning leather, or fishing, formed the basis for their low status.

This discrimination was enforced through a comprehensive system of social prohibitions, including:

- Religious Exclusion: Avarna individuals were strictly prohibited from entering temples and performing worship in common public places of Hindu devotion.
- Spatial Segregation: Avarna communities were forced to live in separate colonies located outside village boundaries. They were strictly prohibited from entering the residential areas of the higher Varnas.
- Distance Pollution (Theendal): Particularly in Southern India, the concept of pollution extended beyond touch. Avarna individuals were required to maintain a mandated physical distance from higher-caste persons to avoid distance pollution.
- Civil and Religious Disbarment: They were historically prohibited from entering temples, using public roads, and drawing water from common wells.
- Public Humiliation: They were subjected to humiliating customs such as being forced to use separate, inferior utensils in eateries (e.g., specific cups in tea shops) and enduring separate seating arrangements in public places.
- Educational and Social Barriers: Avarna children were frequently barred from schools or forced to sit on the floor outside the classroom.
- Dress Codes and Ornament Restrictions: Specific prohibitions on attire and ornaments were imposed to visually mark Avarna individuals. These communities were prohibited from wearing items considered symbols of dignity or prosperity, such as shoes, sandals, or carrying umbrellas. Furthermore, in some regions, Avarna women were historically restricted from covering their upper bodies, and the use of gold or other valuable ornaments was reserved for the Savarna castes, making the absence of such items a clear social identifier.

== Reform ==
The 19th and 20th centuries saw the rise of powerful social reform movements that challenged the ideological foundations of the Varna system, with particular intensity in South India.

- B. R. Ambedkar (1891–1956) was a jurist, economist, and social reformer who served as the central figure in the movement for equality. A highly educated scholar, he received doctorates in economics from Columbia University and the London School of Economics and also trained in law at Gray's Inn. As the architect of the Constitution of India, he ensured the inclusion of Article 17, which formally abolished untouchability. He also established the system of Reservation for affirmative action to rectify historical injustices. In 1956, he renounced Hinduism and led the Dalit Buddhist movement.
- Periyar (1879–1973), also known as E. V. Ramasamy, was a radical social activist and politician. After joining the Indian National Congress in 1919 and participating in the Vaikom Satyagraha to secure temple entry rights, he resigned in 1925, believing the party focused too much on Brahmin interests. He founded the Self-Respect Movement and later the Dravidar Kazhagam, advocating fiercely for rationalism, women's rights, and the eradication of caste, and opposing what he viewed as the imposition of Indo-Aryan culture on the Dravidian people.
- Sree Narayana Guru (1855–1928), a philosopher-saint from Kerala, was instrumental in the region's social revolution. He challenged the Brahminical monopoly on worship by consecrating his own temples in Kerala, Karnataka, and Tamil Nadu, and even Sri Lanka. He famously advocated for the principle of "One Caste, One Religion, One God for Man."
- Dr. P. Palpu (1863–1950), described as the "silent revolutionary" by Sarojini Naidu, was a medical doctor and bacteriologist. Despite his qualifications, he was denied government medical positions in the princely state of Travancore because he belonged to the Ezhava community. His struggle against this discrimination led him to become one of the most revered leaders of Kerala's reform movement. In 1903, he became a founding figure of the Sree Narayana Dharma Paripalana Yogam (SNDP) to organize and uplift marginalized communities.
- Mahatma Ayyankali (1863–1941) was a revolutionary leader in Travancore who dedicated his life to the progress of the oppressed. His most famous act was the Villuvandi Strike (Bullock Cart Protest), where he defiantly rode a decorated bullock cart on public roads, asserting the right of Avarna communities to freedom of movement, a heroic act that is deeply inscribed in Kerala's political history.

== Modern era ==
In contemporary India, the legacy of the Avarna status is addressed through a dual strategy of protection and remediation. The Constitution of India guarantees equality before the law and prohibits discrimination on the grounds of caste.

The Reservation system ensures representation in political bodies, educational institutions, and government employment for Scheduled Castes, Scheduled Tribes, and Other Backward Classes. Despite these legal frameworks, the socio-economic gap and social stigma inherited from centuries of structural exclusion remain significant challenges in Indian society.
