= Namasudra =

Hindu community in the Bengal region of South Asia

Namasudra, earlier known as Chandal, is an Avarna Bengali Hindu community originating from eastern and central Bengal. The term Chandal or Chandala is usually considered to be a slur. They were traditionally engaged in fishing and as boatmen, and later in cultivation. They lived outside the four-tier ritual varna system and thus were outcastes.

== Etymology ==
There is a dearth of discussion as to the etymology of the word namasudra in pre-nineteenth-century Bengali literature and the period of origin of the word is also undetermined. Several theories have been suggested but there is no broad consensus supporting any of them.

== Origins ==
The Namasudra community was considered as untouchable in the eyes of the caste Hindu communities.

They were traditionally engaged in fishing and as boatmen, in the marshy swamps of their native lands. Over the years, as the wetlands were reclaimed for agricultural purposes, they turned to peasant agriculture as a major occupation. Their economic condition was quite poor and rates of indebtedness quite high.

=== Colonial ethnography ===
Colonial ethnographers such as Herbert Hope Risley believed that the Chandals of their time were related to a tribe of the same name that existed in the Vedic Period. However, modern research disputes their opinion for a variety of reasons, including that the main habitat of the modern community in Eastern Bengal was largely outside the core region of Brahmanical civilisation, that regional texts did not refer to them as untouchables and indeed nor was untouchability rigidly practised in Bengal. Furthermore, the modern community does not occupy the extreme lowest tier of the society, unlike the historical tribe, and their social status varied widely from region to region, especially with regard to their material wealth.

The more modern community comprises around twelve endogamous sub-castes, most of whom were derived from the occupational traits of the members and was entitled to differential social-status. But the colonial ethnographers chose to conflate several such low-ranking occupational sub-castes into one caste, without taking the regional variations into account and assigned a fixed social rank to of all Namasudra-Chandals, (something which Bernard Cohn later described as the "objectification" of colonial culture) and falsely stereotyped the entire community as universally despised.

Overall, the term Chandal was a generic term that was initially used to refer to broad groups of people belonging to diverse endogamous communities of similarly despised social position but which later transformed into a caste name and was soon synomously used with the Namasudras.

=== Other views ===
Niharranjan Ray, a historian, believed that in terms of bodily characteristics, they have a closer relation with north Indian Brahmins, saying "they are of the same line as the Brahmans of north India; indeed there is a closer relation between the north Indian Brahmans and the Bengali Namahśūdras than between the north Indian Brahmans and the Bengali Brahmans, Kayasthas and Vaidyas."

== Identity movement ==
=== Transition to Namasudras ===
The creation of a single caste-cluster led to the beginning of the Namasudra Movement. It emphasised the commonality of low social status and that of being subject to oppression, among all the sub-castes and impressed upon them to stand up to the social authority of the high caste bhadraloks, a perceived common enemy, who were largely responsible for their poor conditions.

Libertarian social influences that were prevalent in the region across the eighteenth and nineteenth century are believed to have imparted a major impetus to the Namasudras, against social oppression. Islam followed by Christianity (which was widely prevalent in the Namasudra-belts, courtesy the missionaries) was majorly responsible for granting them a newer dimension of self-respect. The non-orthodox variants of the Bhakti movement, that aligned with the Sahajiya tradition and sought to encompass the downtrodden sections into the society, also catalysed the Namasudras, as a guiding faith.

Various local socio-religious figureheads (Kalachand Vidyalankar, Sahlal Pir, Keshab Pagal et al.), who sought to repudiate the caste (varna) system, further impressed upon large sections of the Namasudra population.

The Namasudras, thus, successfully strived to carve out an autonomous niche in the social fabric of Bengal, where the distinction of caste was obliterated but that none from the Hindu bhadralok community did identify themselves with those sects, they were branded as exotic and subsequently came to be rejected by other sections of the society.

In the 1870s, the Chandals of Bakarganj and Faridpur started a boycott of caste Hindus, (apart from Brahmins), as a form of social-protest, when their higher caste neighbours refused to accept an invitation to dine from a Chandal headman. They passed a resolution that also called for prohibition against default-employment of Chandals in menial duties in state-jails and together, the call for boycott was spread in the name of an order from the government. Further that, any Chandal who did not abide by it was threatened with intra-community ostracism, the movement gained huge support across a wide region.

This first rebellion in the community in a bid to redefine the local power structure failed to garner much because the poorer Chandals had to return to their previous employers after a few months, often agreeing to more harrowing work conditions. The social discrimination continued. Joya Chatterjee says that henceforth they "battled continuously to improve their ritual position" in society and later claimed the "more respectable title of 'Namasudra' and Brahmin status".

It was within this context, that they underwent a transition from the Chandala to Namasudra identity. In 1891, the term Namasudras was recorded in the official census as a synonym for the Chandala(s) and by 1900, it had assumed immense social recognition, as people of the community clung to the new identity and tried to distance themselves from the imagery of the Chandals.

In the very-initial stages, the elimination of differences across various sub-castes and the creation of lateral solidarity was one of the primary goals of the movement.

Gradually, by the late nineteenth century, they came to constitute an organised middle peasantry community, with definite leaders and goals. These movements helped them seek upward mobility by infusing a sense of self-respect. They gradually demanded elevated social status, including a right of entry to Kayastha-organised pujas and a two-thirds share of the crops grown. They began to refuse to work for lower-caste Hindu and Muslim landlords and also boycotted the upper caste Hindus. Overall, Sekhara Bandyopadhyay has noted a distinct theme of sanskritisation in the dynamics of the caste.

Meanwhile, the Matua sect, which was established by Harichand Thakur in the late nineteenth century among the community in the eastern India (and later organised by his son) played a major role in bringing cohesion to the Namasudra community, in terms of faith. Born to a devout Vaishnava family, he gained initial reputation as a spiritual healer and later claimed to be a reincarnation of God, with a duty to ensure salvation of the downtrodden. A cult was gradually developed, which opposed the idea of social hierarchy along with several other Hindu religio-cultural aspects (Gurubad, mantras, idol-worship etc.). Instead, a theme of social equality denouncing untouchability and gender discrimination was put forward. The devotional songs, that were sung in form of Kirtans and namgaan, also helped to collectively reinforce a common congregational identity among themselves.

Whilst the sect did play an important role in organising and propagating the social protests, the efforts to entirely subvert the Hindu society failed and the broader community soon returned to the theme of sanskritisation, whilst still ascribing to the other ideals of the sect.

== Freedom movement ==
In colonial Bengal, the Namasudras constituted the second largest Hindu caste. Their interests differed from those pursuing nationalist politics against the British Raj from the time of the Swadeshi period (1905–11) and thus they did not participate much in that movement. That it was heralded by politicians from the high-caste bhadralok community, who cared little for the lower classes, further broadened the gaps.

In July 1905, the British government validated a proposal for partitioning Bengal along religious lines. Whilst the Congress protested this and asked for a total boycott of foreign goods, the Namasudras thought differently. A series of resolutions by community leaders and multiple submissions to British authorities during 1906 affirmed their complete support for the partition scheme, through which they hoped to obtain equal rights in the proposed eastern state where they, along with Muslims, dominated the populace. It was on this issue that the bhadralok politicians of Bengal faced the first resistance from a community previously insignificant in the broader polity of the nation. Swadeshi leaders reacted by touring extensively in the Namasudra areas, trying to persuade them to join the agitation and, if that failed, bribing, intimidating and coercing them by such means as constructing schools. But the community leaders, including Guruchand, were steadfast against supporting a political movement that supposedly catered to the interests of the upper class and had no plan of social reform.

The colonial government often provided extensive economic patronage and took steps in reforming their social condition by constructing educational hostels, exclusive-schools et al. which penetrated deep down the community. This was in contrary to the nationalists who were too apathetic to these causes and seldom helped them, in their times of distress. The Namasudras thus rejected the nationalist politics and instead, along with other untouchable castes continued their independent social movement that increasingly self-asserted their independence from the upper castes and threatened to distort the Hindu-societal-structure. Subsequently, the nationalists sought to align themselves, at-least orally, with the cause of depressed classes. Post-arrival of Gandhi in the political landscape, as nationalist politics choose to encompass the entire populace of the nation and gradually transcended into mass-movements, parties started extensive lobbying for the causes of the Namasudra.

This was first visible in 1913, as to the setting up a hostel for the students from Namasudra community in Kolkata, who faced immense hardship in securing lodging facilities. Ironically, whilst it was the extensive nationalist lobbying throughout the years that persuaded the colonial government to implement the proposal in 1918, the colonial government took advantage of the ignorance of the general masses as to the proceedings that happened behind the door and usurped an image of benevolence. This further drifted the community away from nationalist causes. The same events happened in another case, when the Depressed Classes Mission, (which worked for nationalist causes) and ran about 60 schools in different parts of Bengal, for the Namasudra community and other backward classes was gradually inculcated as an agency of the colonial government, after it applied for a government grant to overcome fund shortage. The Namasudra community was unaware of these institutional developments and all the good work that was done by the Mission, was attributed to the colonial government.

The Namsudras maintained a more aggressive anti-nationalist stance during the Home-rule Movement. They saw the movement as a plan, hatched among the upper-caste leaders, to snatch the minimal levels of power that has been assigned to them by the colonial government and claimed the Congress leaders to be a small band of vociferous people from organised castes, without any touch to reality. A meeting of Namasudra delegates, who were supposedly elected, in a democratic manner from different regions of Bengal, passed a resolution that the community would be loyal to the crown and that it supported Montague-Chelmsford reforms, in the sense that further distribution of powers would re-concentrate power in a few hands and would not lead to any progress for the backward castes. The nationalists promised the establishment of equality, democracy and reforms in the new home-ruled-state but failed to instill any confidence within the community.

At the 1917 session of Congress, a resolution was passed that emphasised the necessity, justice and righteousness of removing all disabilities imposed by custom on the Depressed Classes. One Namasudra delegate was convinced to support the demand for Home-Rule but the community generally was not swayed by mere symbolic actions and the delegate was subsequently criticised as a Congress stooge. Even in the 1920s when mass-nationalism affected the entire country and Gandhi extensively campaigned to include the lower strata of society in the Congress fold, Namasudra-dominated districts were mostly unaffected. The leaders of the movement steadfastly rejected whiffs of nationalism, which they believed to be another tool designed for the interests of wealthy upper-caste Bhadraloks. Resolutions were again passed that supported the British confederacy and in some places the Namasudras actively helped the colonial government to foil Congress.

The colonial government further satisfied the community, as it introduced reservation(s) for the lower-classes in provincial services, thus providing employment opportunities and vouched for a proper representation of them. The Government of India Act 1919 provided for the inclusion of a depressed classes representative among the nominated non-official members of the Bengal Legislative Council. Meanwhile, Congress hardly invested any ground efforts, other than at verbal lobbying and behind-the-scenes work and much of their work were horribly ill-timed. In the Khulna famine of 1920, whilst the colonial government sought to mobilise relief, the Congress went on to continue the Non-cooperation at full zeal and was blamed for increasing the fatalities.

The Bengal Namasudra Conference in 1922 and 1923 further heightened the anti-nationalist stance and planned a definite agenda that encompassed both social and political upliftment of the community. Whilst, Gandhi attracted some admirers due to his social stances, his views offered no political aspirations for the leaders, which were an easy way to status and wealth. There was a considerable majority in the first conference that supported the nationalist causes including widow-remarriage and boycott of foreign goods, managing to bring the proceedings to a halt but had trickled down to a negligible minority, in the second.

But, as the elections took place in 1923, the Namasudra leadership was found to be much less efficient as to mobilising the average voters to partake in modern-day-politics. Subsequently, they lost all the seats, even in the electorates where the Namasudras heavily dominated the numbers. This was also attributed to the developments of fissures in the movement, that was extremely united thus far, when two famed Namasudra leaders switched loyalties to the Swaraj Party and a division began to form along nationalist lines.

The steadfast attitude towards nationalism, throughout the years, that owed more to the need of a voice of protest against the oppressive higher castes than to the benefits provided by the British government, was crumbling down gradually and fissures were beginning to develop. The Hindu solidarity soon followed in realising that the alienation of lower-castes might hamper its plans of offering a united opposition against the British and the Muslims, as conversions became abundant and threatened to dwindle the numbers of Hindus. Subsequently, the All India Hindu Mahasabha, Bharat Sevasram Sangha et al. actively started to mobilise the lower-caste people.

In the late 1930s, especially after the Poona Pact, the Namasudras of Bengal Presidency increasingly adhered to a loyalist stance to the British Government, which was supposedly its best chance to upgrade their socio-economic condition and all throughout and they consistently remained alienated from the nationalist politics. Overall, numerous measures were taken over the course of years to alleviate the concerns of the community and to ensure that they were gradually inculcated into the nationalist political-fabric of the nation. Un-touch-ability was propounded as a vice and there were campaigns for providing them with better social rights. The Congress also contributed to these causes via their political programs, largely for the same goals. The Dalit of Bengal, thus became intrinsically involved in the Partition movement, and the Namsudras along with Rajbanshis became the two groups that majorly dominated Dalit politics in the province.

According to Bandyopadhyay, the aim of the Hindu campaign, throughout the years, was to merely induce the lower castes record themselves as Hindus, which would inflate their numbers and thus, assist them in the redistribution of provinces during partition of the nation rather than to harvest a social reform. The main aim was to agglomerate the lower castes in the fold of Hindus and unitedly fight against the Muslim and the British. It propagandised the local peasant-rebellions between Namasudras and Muslim community across Dacca et al. with religious colours thereby increasing communal tensions and prospects of partition. In some places, the Namasudras even sided with Muslims against the socio-economic oppression of Hindu zamindars but it was again branded as a communal riot. The Bengal Congress also contributed to the cause. Nonetheless, the organised efforts to articulate the Hindu identity somewhat worked and some of the riots did have a religious flavor.

Gradually, whilst many leaders of the caste-movement increasingly associated with the Hindu narrative, and many Namasudras associated with the views of the Hindu solidarity, there was still a lack of consensus among the masses. In fact, there was a strong discontent among Namasudras that they have been supposedly cheated by the enumerators of the 1941 census where they were recorded as Hindus instead of mere Namasudras.

But, by 1947, a majority of Namasudras actively associated them with the Hindus and that the partition was inevitable, their primary aim was to keep their habitat- the districts of Bakarganj, Faridpur, Jessore and Khulna within the Hindu majority province of West Bengal. But they managed to maintain a separate caste identity throughout. Ultimately, the efforts of the campaign failed to achieve much of its desired goal because districts that were mostly inhabited by Namasudras went to East Bengal despite vehement protestations by them. Overall, whilst these attempts at altering the social situation improved things to some extent, discrimination was still markedly abundant and the domination by upper castes continued even post-independence.

== Post-independence ==
=== Migration to India ===
Whilst an assemblage of relatively well-off Namasudras immediately migrated to India, using their resources of property, the poorer community members stayed. Sekhar Bandyopadhyay notes that despite Jinnah's promise of equality for all, they were soon subjected to "a process of 'Othering'" as the state sought for "greater Islamisation of the polity" and that the upper-caste-Hindus had almost all left East Bengal, the communal agitation was now solely directed against the lower-caste and untouchable Hindus. An acute economic crisis in some districts, coinciding with a labour-surplus market and the Muslim landlords preferring to employ coreligionists, was another mitigating factor. All these, coupled with numerous provocations ranging from unlawful occupation of land to public humiliation of women and direct instruction to leave the country, led to a build-up of insecurity among the Namasudras.

From around January 1950, the Namasudra peasants decided to migrate to India in large numbers and this continued until 1956, with about 10,000 refugees entering every month. Retaliatory communal violence across both sides of the border also contributed to the cause. There was again a mass migration after the Hazratbal riot in 1964. A police intelligence report in June 1952 reported that "About 95 per cent of the refugees are Namasudras".

=== Condition in India ===
Whilst most of the Namasudra refugees who arrived after 1950, were automatically designated as cultivators without any means for survival and were thus dispatched to official refugee camps, some did independently settle across villages in Nadia, Basirhat et al. The latter were often involved in violent fracases with the local Muslims and cross-border communal rivalries, in search of land and livestock, were reported too. That they had to also contend with the local Hindu upper castes, made the situation worse.

Those who were dispatched to the refugee camps spend months in imposed idleness whilst being rewarded with a meager cash dole and weekly ration. They were restricted from going out of the camps, look for jobs or interact with the local population, who were often deeply suspicious of the refugees. Thereafter, they started mobilising themselves under the umbrage of Bastuhara Samitis (refugee associations) and other leaders like Ramendra Kishor Mullick, who claimed to be close to P. R. Thakur and Manohar Roy, who claimed himself to be a right-hand man of Jogen Mandal to protest against the camp administration in a variety of forms.

Finally, the government, in early 1956 announced the Dandakaranya Scheme of rehabilitating them in a region consisting of 78,000 square miles of inhospitable unirrigated land in the tribal areas of Orissa and Madhya Pradesh. The scheme was compulsory, pending which the refugee camps were to be closed down. Some were also rehabilitated to neighbouring provinces of Assam, Bihar, Orissa and the Andaman Islands.

The schemes were heavily protested and in March–April 1958, umbrella-refugee-organisations United Central Refugee Council (UCRC) and the Sara Bangla Bastuhara Samiti (SBBS)]organised satyagraha campaigns, with political patronage, that lasted for about a month and resulted in the arrests of 30,000 refugees. Most were camp-refugees and 70 per cent of them were Namasudras. Gradually, the campaign, as to an acceptable solution of the refugee issues began to lose momentum as the organisations were more interested in exploiting the refugee-base, as an exercise in electoral constituency building for the political parties.

By 1965, 7,500 refugee families were forcibly settled there and because of their dispersal, the Namasudras, who were till-then a closely knit community, as to local-geography, lost their capacity to organise powerful protest movements. The conditions across Dandakaranya camps were extremely poor and that the refugees not only failed to integrate with the native Adivasis but also had to deal with a corrupt government mechanism made survival more difficult.

Bandyopadhyay has noted that throughout the times, the Namasudras whilst existing in the refugee camps, did not articulate their caste identity; they along with all others shared the common tag of refugees. And that this led a large section of the Dalit community to lose their distinctive and autonomous political voice. But, nevertheless some means (following different rituals et al.) were adopted by them to distinguish from other castes and maintain a conscious identity of their original identity.

==== Thakurnagar ====
A prominent Namasudra leader, Pramatha Ranjan Thakur, who was once elected to the Constituent Assembly with Congress support and opposed reservation for the Scheduled Castes whilst advocating drastic social reforms, emerged as a political and spiritual figure-head during the refugee crisis. He was the guru of the Matua Mahasangha (MM), which his great-grandfather had established, and thus had a huge following among the Namasudras. In December 1947, he purchased a piece of land in North 24-Parganas, about 63 km (39 mi) from Kolkata, between Chandpara and Gobordanga, and started a venture for purposes of refugee rehabilitation. This led to the establishment of Thakurnagar, the first Dalit-refugee colony in India started by Dalits themselves. The locality grew in size and within the next ten years, more than 50,000 Dalit refugees, mostly Namasudras, had settled in what became a major cultural centre for them.

==== Marichjhapi massacre ====
The Congress government of West Bengal during the refugee crisis was widely perceived as anti-refugee because of its position regarding rehabilitation. The Communist Party of India (Marxist) (CPI(M)), as the main opposition party, opposed the government's dispersal policy and demanded rehabilitation of refugees in the uninhabited islands of Sunderban, thus gaining a following among the Namasudra refugees.

In 1977, as CPI(M) became the governing party, almost 150,000 refugees returned to West Bengal from Dandakaranya. By now, the economy was in a poor state and the CPIM arranged deportation of many of them back to Dandakaranya. However, a group of about 30,000 refugees managed to infiltrate the Sunderbans and establish a settlement at Marichjhapi, which included such things as schools, health centres, and fishing industries. The government declared the establishment to be illegal, as a contravention of the prohibitions on permanent settlement in the Forest Acts, and asked them to abandon the settlement to protect the ecological diversity of the region.

As the persuasion failed to convince them, beginning 26 January 1979, the local police, on the behest of the government, undertook drastic measures which included razing the dwellings of the islanders, destroying fisheries, tube-wells et al. and complete-blockading of the island. Despite considerable criticism from the press and a restraining order from the High Court. Boats of escaping refugees were sunk, and mass-firings were also reported, which led to numerous casualties over the course of next few days.

Finally, as the efforts by the local-police-machinery failed to address the issue in its entirety, the Government ordered a forcible evacuation of the refugees in a 48-hour span from 14 May 1979 to 16 May 1979, in what was called the Marichjhapi Massacre by the scholarly community. Several hundred refugees died in numerous police-firings whilst many more perished as a result of starvation, exhaustion et al. Usage of mercenaries and mass-rapes were also reported. No criminal charges were laid against anyone and the Scheduled Castes and Tribes Commission, in its annual report denied the happening of any atrocity on the Untouchables in Bengal.

==== Modern day politics and status ====
Matua Mahasangha has transformed itself into a major socio-religious organisation and has one of its major aims as to mobilisation of the dispersed Namasudra community and to convert Thakurnagar into a new cultural and spiritual hub for a Namasudra renaissance. In 2010, it claimed to have nearly 50 million members, belonging to 100 to 120 thousand families.

On the occasion of baruni mela – the major festival of the sect – lakhs of devotees from all over India were reported to visit Thakurnagar, in the sort of an annual pilgrimage.

The members of the community have been reported to have fared quite well, post 1980 but despite their educational and social progress, the class remained politically marginal for a long span of time but have often actively negotiated with mainstream political parties for political empowerment.

Beginning the utilisation of the network of the MMS, by All India Trinamool Congress, (which included nominating family members of PR Thakur as MLAs), the group managed to establish an independent identity in politics. TMC did succeed in consolidating Matua votes in its favour in the 2011 state-elections and the consolidation has been attributed to be a cause behind its decisive victory in the South Bengal seats.

The BJP converted the Namasudra community into their voter base in West Bengal through the promise of granting citizenship via the Citizenship (Amendment) Act, 2019.

== See also ==
- List of Namasudras
