= Chandala =

Outcaste in Hindu society

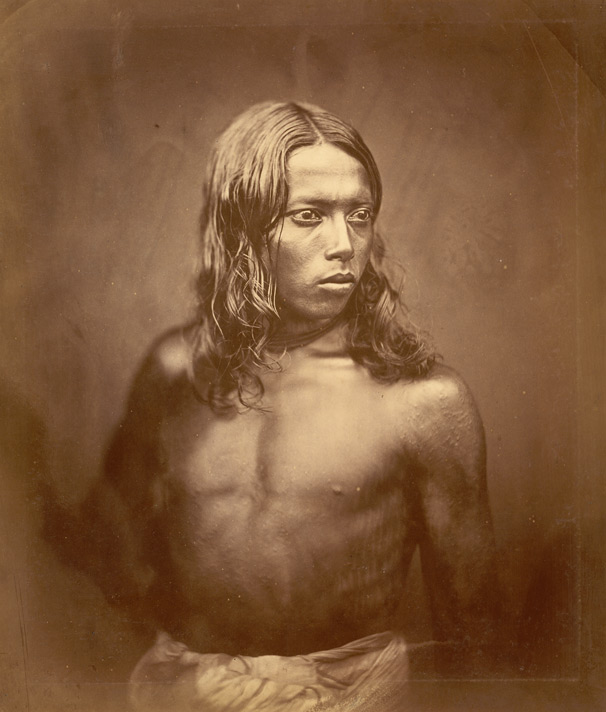
A man belonging to Chandala or Namasudra caste in East Bengal in 1860.

Chandala (Sanskrit: चण्डाल) is a Sanskrit word for someone who deals with the disposal of corpses, and is also the name of a Hindu lower caste, traditionally considered to be untouchable.

== History ==
Varṇa was a hierarchical social order in ancient India, based primarily on the Dharmashastras. However, since the Vedic corpus constitute the earliest literary source, it came to be seen as the origin of caste society. In this view of caste, varṇas were created on a particular occasion and have remained virtually unchanged. Historically this order of society, notions of purity and pollution were central, and activities were delineated in this context. Varṇa divides the society into four groups ordered in a hierarchy; beyond these, outside the system, lies a fifth group known as the untouchables, of which the Chandala became a constituent part.

The first mention of the fourfold varṇa division is found in the later Rigveda. Vedic literature also mentions some groups, such as Ayogava, Chandala, Nishada, and Paulkasa, which were outside the four-varṇa classification. They were referred to as belonging to the "panchama varṇa" or panchamas, meaning fifth. The Yajur-Veda mentions their degradation from the varṇa classes, mentioning the Chandala group in particular, who were said to be the untouchable class of people born of the union between a Shudra male and a Brahmin female.

There are frequent references to the forest-dwellers in the post-Rigvedic literature; the Chandalas were one of these primitive people, who belonged to the fringes of the society.

In many parts of India, Chandal is used as a pejorative or an insult among Hindus, even though castes known as such are not practically present outside Bengal (Namasudras).

== Reference by travelers to India ==
During his travel across India in the 4th–5th centuries CE, Chinese traveler Faxian mentioned Chandalas while talking about the people of India:

Throughout the whole country the people do not kill any living creature, nor drink intoxicating liquor, nor eat onions or garlic. The only exception is that of the Chandalas. That is the name for those who are (held to be) wicked men, and live apart from others. ... In that country they do not keep pigs and fowls, and do not sell live cattle; in the markets there are no butchers' shops and no dealers in intoxicating drink. In buying and selling commodities they use cowries. Only the Chandalas are fishermen and hunters, and sell flesh meat.

== See also ==
- Tschandala
- Namasudra
