= Matua Mahasangha =

Religious movement in Indian subcontinent

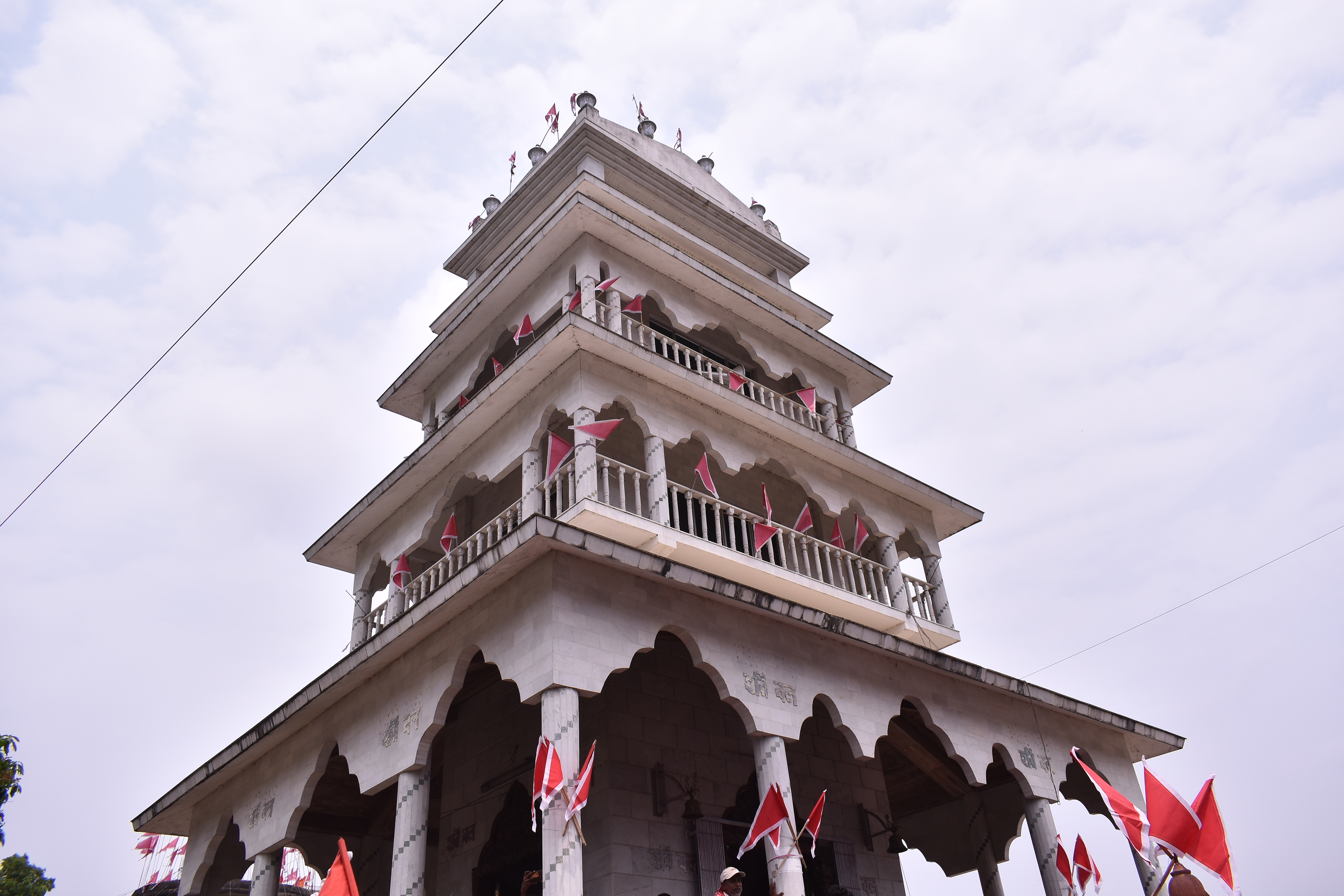
- The Thakurbari Temple of the Matua Mahasangha

Total population
- c. 50 millions

Founder
- Harichand Thakur

Religions
- Matua

Languages
- Sacred; Bengali and Sanskrit; Holy Book; Harililamrito; Majority; Bengali

Related ethnic groups
- Namasudras

The Matua Mahasangha (Bengali: মতুয়া মহাসংঘ) is a Hindu reform movement that originated around 1860 AD in modern-day Bangladesh. Today, it has a considerable number of adherents both in Bangladesh and in West Bengal, India.

The Matua movement originated among the Namasudras, an avarna (outcaste) community of Bengali Hindus, founded by the followers of Harichand Thakur. The teachings of Harichand, also known as Matuaism, emphasise the importance of education for the upliftment of the population, while also providing a formula for ending social conflict.

Members of the Matua Mahasangha believe in Swayam-Dikshiti ("Self-Realisation") through harinaam, the chanting of the holy name of Hari (God). Harichand stressed the congressional chanting of God's name as the sole means to mukti (liberation). In Bengali, this is known as hariname matoara, giving rise to the name "Matua".

== History ==
Harichand Thakur was born to a peasant family belonging to the Namasudra community. According to historian Sekhar Bandyopadhyay, Thakur "experienced atma darshan or self revelation, through which he realized that he was the incarnation of God himself, born in this world to bring salvation to the downtrodden". Reforming Vaishnava devotionalism, he established the Matua sect of Hinduism. The sect was centered in Thakur's ancestral village, Orakandi, Faridpur, Bengal Presidency (now in Bangladesh). Their most sacred shrines are located there.

The Matua Mahasangha ("Matua Federation") was formed by adherents of Harichand's philosophy before 1915 to organize devotees. In the early 1930s, Pramatha Ranjan Thakur, great-grandson of Harichand Thakur, rejuvenated the organization. He started an ashram in the Labanchora neighborhood of Khulna, Bangladesh. After the partition of India in 1947, large numbers of Matua migrants settled in West Bengal, India, Pramatha Ranjan Thakur among them. He founded the town of Thakurnagar, which became the new headquarters of the Matua Mahasangha.

== Notes and references ==
=== References ===
- Bandyopadhyay, Sekhar (17 November 1990). "Community Formation and Communal Conflict-Namasudra-Muslim Riot in Jessore-Khulna". Economic & Political Weekly. 25 (46): 2563–2568. JSTOR 4396995.
- Bandyopadhyay, Sekhar (1995). "The Matua Sect and the Namasudras". In Ray, Rajat Kanta (ed.). Mind Body and Society: Life and Mentality in Colonial Bengal. Oxford University Press. ISBN 019-563757-7.
- Lorea, Carola Erika (28 February 2020). "Religion, Caste, and Displacement: The Matua Community". In Ludden, David (ed.). Oxford Research Encyclopedias: Asian History. Oxford University Press. doi:10.1093/acrefore/9780190277727.013.428. ISBN 978-0-19-027772-7.
- Mandal, Mahitosh (2022). "Dalit Resistance during the Bengal Renaissance: Five Anti-Caste Thinkers from Colonial Bengal, India". Caste: A Global Journal on Social Exclusion. 3 (1): 11–30. doi:10.26812/caste.v3i1.367.
- Mukherjee, Aditi (2020). "Re-thinking protracted displacements: insights from a namasudra refugee camp-site in suburban Calcutta". Contemporary South Asia. 28 (1): 58–73. doi:10.1080/09584935.2019.1666089.
- Walker, Dennis (Winter 1999). "Matua Untouchable Writers In West Bengal: Between Islam And India's Changing Upper Caste-Led System". Islamic Studies. 38 (4): 563–602. JSTOR 20837062.
