= First Nazimuddin ministry =

Government in Bengal Province, British India

First Ministry of Khwaja Nazimuddin
- 3rd Cabinet of Bengal Province
- 1943–1945
- Date formed: 24 April 1943
- Date dissolved: 31 March 1945

People and organisations
- Governor: John Herbert; Richard Casey
- Chief Minister: Khwaja Nazimuddin
- No. of ministers: 13
- Ministers removed: 0
- Total no. of members: 13
- Member party: Government: AIML; ISCP; Independent
- Status in legislature: Majority 140 / 250 (56%)
- Opposition party: Progressive Coalition: KPP; INC; ABHM; Independent
- Opposition leader: A. K. Fazlul Huq

History
- Election: 1937
- Legislature term: 1st Bengal Legislative Assembly
- Predecessor: Huq II
- Successor: Suhrawardy

First Nazimuddin ministry was the third cabinet formed in the Bengal Province, British India. It was formed in 1943 under the leadership of provincial prime minister Khwaja Nazimuddin, leader of the Bengal Provincial Muslim League (BPML), and remained in office until 1945, when it was dissolved following a vote of no confidence in the Bengal Legislative Assembly, after which governor's rule was imposed in the province.

== Background ==
Around 1942, as the Quit India Movement intensified, Bengal's cabinet Second Huq ministry sided with the movement and took measures, as far as possible, to oppose the government's efforts to suppress it. Also, the cabinet criticized authoritarian attitude and tendency to make unilateral decisions of governor John Herbert. As a result, the governor compelled the provincial prime minister, A. K. Fazlul Huq, to resign. At the time, the Bengal Provincial Muslim League (BPML), the provincial branch of the All-India Muslim League (AIML), supported the British authorities and opposed the cabinet. Following Huq's resignation, his cabinet was dissolved, and on 24 April 1943, a new cabinet was formed under the leadership of Khwaja Nazimuddin, the parliamentary leader of the BPML.

== Fate ==
The BPML-led cabinet came under criticism from the opposition for administrative corruption and its failure to deal with the Bengal famine of 1943. The cabinet enjoyed the support of the British authorities. However, after losing the support of 21 members of the legislature, it was defeated in a vote of no confidence on 18 March 1945, and Syed Nausher Ali, Speaker of the Bengal Legislative Assembly, declared the dissolution of the cabinet through a parliamentary ruling. In the 1946 provincial election, the BPML again won the election, and on 24 April 1946, another cabinet was formed under the leadership of Huseyn Suhrawardy.

== Members ==
The cabinet consisted of the following ministers:

| Portfolio | Minister | Took office | Left office | Party |
|---|---|---|---|---|
| Prime Minister's Office | Khwaja Nazimuddin | 24 April 1943 | 31 March 1945 | AIML |
| Civil Supplies Department | Huseyn Suhrawardy | 24 April 1943 | 31 March 1945 | AIML |
| Finance Department | Tulsi Chandra Goswami | 24 April 1943 | 31 March 1945 | Independent |
| Education Department | Maulvi Tamizuddin Khan | 24 April 1943 | 31 March 1945 | AIML |
| Communications and Public Works Department | Barada Prasanna Pain | 24 April 1943 | 31 March 1945 | Independent |
| Agriculture Department | Syed Muazzemuddin Hossain | 24 April 1943 | 31 March 1945 | AIML |
| Revenue Department | Tarak Nath Mukherjee | 24 April 1943 | 31 March 1945 | Independent |
| Judicial and Legislative Department | Kazi Musharraf Hussain | 24 April 1943 | 31 March 1945 | AIML |
| Commerce, Labour and Industries Department | Khwaja Shahabuddin | 24 April 1943 | 31 March 1945 | AIML |
| Forests and Excise Department | Prem Hari Barma | 24 April 1943 | 31 March 1945 | ISCP |
| Public Health and Local Self-Government Department | Jalaluddin Ahmad | 24 April 1943 | 31 March 1945 | AIML |
| Publicity Department | Pulin Behari Mullick | 24 April 1943 | 31 March 1945 | ISCP |
| Co-operatives, Credit and Rural Indebtedness Department | Jogendra Nath Mandal | 24 April 1943 | 31 March 1945 | ISCP |
