= Second Nazimuddin ministry =

First cabinet of East Pakistan

Second Ministry of Khawaja Nazimuddin
- 1st Cabinet of East Bengal
- 1947–1948
- Date formed: 15 August 1947
- Date dissolved: 14 September 1948

People and organisations
- Governor: Frederick Chalmers Bourne
- Chief Minister: Khawaja Nazimuddin
- No. of ministers: 10
- Total no. of members: 10
- Member party: PML
- Status in legislature: Majority 141 / 170 (83%)
- Opposition party: PNC
- Opposition leader: Basanta Kumar Das

History
- Election: 1946
- Outgoing election: 1937
- Legislature term: 1st East Bengal Legislative Assembly
- Predecessor: Suhrawardy
- Successor: Amin

Second Nazimuddin ministry was the first cabinet formed in the eastern province of Pakistan, East Bengal (later renamed East Pakistan). It was formed in 1947 under the leadership of Khawaja Nazimuddin, the president of the Bengal Provincial Muslim League (BPML) and leader of the All-Pakistan Awami League (AIML). The cabinet lasted for about a year and was later replaced by the Amin ministry following the death of Muhammad Ali Jinnah, founding governor-general of Pakistan.

== Background ==
In 1947, the Indian National Congress (INC) and the All-India Muslim League (AIM) agreed to the partition of India, which was under British rule, leading to the creation of the modern states of India and Pakistan. In 20 June of the same year, when elections were held regarding the Second Partition of Bengal, a majority in the Bengal Legislative Assembly voted in favor of partition. At the time, the AIML-led Suhrawardy ministry, under Huseyn Shaheed Suhrawardy, which governed Bengal Province, remained in the provincial capital Calcutta. In 27 June, at an emergency meeting of the Bengal Provincial Muslim League (BPML), a decision was made to establish the capital of the proposed Pakistani Bengal in Dacca. In 18 July, the Indian Independence Act 1947 was passed by the Parliament of the United Kingdom and received royal assent, implementing the partition of the province into the Indian province of West Bengal and the Pakistani province of East Bengal. On 5 August 1947, after Suhrawardy lost BPML's parliamentary leadership election by 36 votes, Khawaja Nazimuddin was elected as the new leader. On 15 August 1947, the day after Pakistan's independence, Nazimuddin was sworn in as the chief minister of the newly formed province of East Bengal with two of his ministers, in Dacca's Curzon Hall, before the provincial governor Frederick Chalmers Bourne. Cabinet member Nurul Amin proposed the formation of a coalition cabinet between the INC and the AIML in both West Bengal and East Bengal, and reportedly held discussions with Congress leader Kiran Shankar Roy of East Bengal regarding this. In 20 August, it was announced that the number of cabinet members would be increased before the completion of the first month. In 23 August, it was reported that 6 new members, including 2 Hindus and 1 Scheduled Caste representative, would join the cabinet. In 10 September, it was learned that 4 new members would be inducted into the cabinet by 12 September. In 12 September, the chief minister announced the names of the 4 new members, who were to be sworn in on 15 September. After the swearing-in of the new cabinet members on the scheduled date, the reassignment of ministerial portfolios was announced on 16 September.

== Dissolution ==
On 11 September 1948, Muhammad Ali Jinnah, the governor-general of Pakistan, died. On 14 September 1948, Nazimuddin became the new governor-general. As a result, on 15 September 1948, this cabinet was replaced by the Amin ministry.

== Members ==
The cabinet consisted of the following ministers:

| Portfolio | Minister | Took office | Left office |
|---|---|---|---|
| Chief Minister's Office | Khawaja Nazimuddin | 15 August 1947 | 15 September 1948 |
| Department of Public Relations | Nurul Amin | 15 August 1947 | 15 September 1948 |
| Department of Finance, Commerce and Industry | Hamidul Huq Choudhury | 15 August 1947 | 15 September 1948 |
| Department of Education | Abdul Hamid | 12 September 1947 | 15 September 1948 |
| Department of Transport, Public Works and Waterways | Hasan Ali | 12 September 1947 | 15 September 1948 |
| Department of Agriculture, Cooperation and Relief | Syed Muhammad Afzal | 12 September 1947 | 15 September 1948 |
| Department of Public Health and Local Government | Habibullah Bahar Chowdhury | 12 September 1947 | 15 September 1948 |
| | Abdul Motaleb Malik | 28 May 1948 | 15 September 1948 |
| Department of Civil Supplies, Rehabilitation, Registration and Labour | Mafizuddin Ahmad | 28 May 1948 | 15 September 1948 |
| Department of Revenue | Tafazzal Ali | 28 May 1948 | 15 September 1948 |

== Former members ==
The list of former ministers is as follows:

| Portfolio | Minister | Took office | Left office |
|---|---|---|---|
| Department of Civil Supplies | Nurul Amin | 15 August 1947 | 28 May 1948 |
| Department of Revenue and Labour | Hamidul Huq Choudhury | 15 August 1947 | 28 May 1948 |
