= Amin ministry =

Second cabinet of East Pakistan

Ministry of Nurul Amin
- 2nd Cabinet of East Bengal
- 1948–1954
- Date formed: 15 September 1948
- Date dissolved: 14 March 1954

People and organisations
- Governor: Frederick Chalmers Bourne; A.S.M. Akram; Feroz Khan Noon; Abdur Rahman Siddiqui; Chaudhry Khaliquzzaman
- Chief Minister: Nurul Amin
- No. of ministers: 9
- Ministers removed: 3
- Total no. of members: 12
- Member party: PML
- Status in legislature: Majority 141 / 170 (83%)
- Opposition party: PNC
- Opposition leader: Basanta Kumar Das

History
- Election: 1946
- Outgoing election: 1937
- Legislature term: 1st East Bengal Legislative Assembly
- Predecessor: Nazimuddin II
- Successor: Huq III

The Amin ministry was the second cabinet formed in the eastern province of Pakistan, East Bengal (later renamed East Pakistan). It was formed in 1948 under the leadership of Nurul Amin, following the appointment of chief minister Khawaja Nazimuddin as the Governor-General of Pakistan. The cabinet, led by Amin and affiliated with the Pakistan Muslim League (PML), lasted for nearly five years before being succeeded by the Third Huq ministry.

== Background ==
On 15 August 1947, the day after the independence of Pakistan, the first provincial cabinet of East Bengal was sworn in at Curzon Hall in the provincial capital Dacca. The oath was administered by the provincial governor Frederick Chalmers Bourne to chief minister Khawaja Nazimuddin and two of his ministers. On 11 September 1948, Muhammad Ali Jinnah, the Governor-General of Pakistan, died. On 14 September 1948, Nazimuddin became the new governor-general. On the same day, Nurul Amin, East Bengal's minister of civil supplies, returned to the provincial capital from the federal capital Karachi. It was stated that, at the call of the provincial governor, he would form a new cabinet with members of the previous cabinet. The following day, in respect of Jinnah's death, the new cabinet members were sworn in without any formal ceremony. This cabinet had eight members, and Amin served as the chief minister.

== Dissolution ==
The disclosed documents of the United States stated that during the Bengali language movement, following the killing of students by police firing on 21 February 1952, chief minister Amin wished to resign amid ensuing unrest. At that time, two provincial ministers discussed forming a new cabinet with A. K. Fazlul Huq, who was then a supporter of the PML. However, under pressure from a group of government officials led by Aziz Ahmed, Amin did not resign at that time. The officials believed that if Huq became the next chief minister, he would include leftists and supporters of United Bengal in his cabinet, potentially leading to the disintegration of the province. On 7 December 1953, ahead of the upcoming provincial legislative assembly elections, a resolution was adopted at a public meeting of the East Pakistan Youth League held in Barisal, calling for the dissolution of the cabinet and the formation of a caretaker cabinet. In the first ever East Bengal Legislative Assembly election, held over four days from 8 to 12 March 1954, the United Front, the coalition of four parties, won 228 out of 309 seats. On 14 March 1954, the term of the first East Bengal Legislative Assembly ended, and the cabinet was dissolved. As a result, on 3 April 1954, the Third Huq ministry was formed under the leadership of Huq, leader of the newly-founded Krishak Sramik Party (KSP), a constituent of the United Front.

== Members ==
The cabinet was composed of the following ministers:

Portfolio	Minister	Took office	Left office
Prime Minister's Office and Home Department	Nurul Amin	15 September 1948	14 March 1954
Education Department	Abdul Hamid	15 September 1948	N/A
Communication, Public Works and Irrigation Department	Hasan Ali	15 September 1948	N/A
Civil Supplies Department	Syed Muhammad Afzal	15 September 1948	N/A
Health and Local Government Department	Habibullah Bahar Chowdhury	15 September 1948	N/A
Relief, Rehabilitation, Registration and Prisons Department	Mafizuddin Ahmad	15 September 1948	N/A
Revenue and Department	Tafazzal Ali	15 September 1948	N/A
Finance, Commerce and Industries Department	Syed Abdus Salim	28 October 1949	N/A
Agriculture and Labor Department	Hamiduddin Ahmad Khan	12 June 1950	N/A
Co-operation Department	Dwarikanath Barori	12 June 1950	N/A

== Former members ==
Portfolio	Minister	Took office	Left office
Finance, Commerce and Industry Department	Hamidul Huq Choudhury	15 September 1948	27 October 1949
Agriculture, Cooperative and Labor Department	Abdul Motaleb Malik	15 September 1948	11 June 1950
