= Second Huq ministry =

Government in Bengal Province, British India

Second Ministry of A. K. Fazlul Huq
- 2nd Cabinet of Bengal Province
- 1941–1943
- Date formed: 12 December 1941
- Date dissolved: 29 March 1943

People and organisations
- Governor: John Herbert
- Chief Minister: A. K. Fazlul Huq
- No. of ministers: 9
- Ministers removed: 0
- Total no. of members: 9
- Member party: Progressive Coalition: KPP; INC; CSP; ABHM; ISCP; Independent
- Status in legislature: Majority 137 / 250 (55%)
- Opposition party: AIML; Independent
- Opposition leader: Khwaja Nazimuddin

History
- Election: 1937
- Legislature term: 1st Bengal Legislative Assembly
- Predecessor: Huq I
- Successor: Nazimuddin I

The Second Huq ministry, also known as the Shyama–Huq ministry, was the second cabinet formed in Bengal Province, British Raj. It was formed in 1941 under the leadership of Bengal's prime minister A. K. Fazlul Huq, leader of the Krishak Praja Party (KPP), and remained in office until 1943, when it was dissolved following the resignation of the prime minister at the direction of governor John Herbert.

== Background ==
In 1937, the Krishak Praja Party (KPP) and the Bengal Provincial Muslim League (BPML) formed a coalition ministry in the Bengal Province, British India under the leadership of KPP leader A. K. Fazlul Huq. However, due to the conflicting political ideologies of the BPML and the KPP, as well as uprising of communal politics, a rift gradually developed between Huq and the BPML. After he joined the National Defence Council at the request of the British authorities, Huq came into conflict with Muhammad Ali Jinnah, the president of the All-India Muslim League (AIML). Consequently, Huq was expelled from the AIML's Central Working Committee, and on 1 December 1941, the BPML members resigned from the ministry. Subsequently, 119 members of the Bengal Legislative Assembly, under the leadership of Huq, formed the Progressive Coalition Party, and after a parliamentary group of 137 members submitted a memorandum in support of the coalition to the provincial governor John Herbert, he invited Huq to form a new ministry.

== Fate ==
Around 1942, as the Quit India Movement intensified, the ministry sided with the movement and, to the extent possible, took measures opposing the government's attempts to suppress it. It also criticized the authoritarian attitude and unilateral decision-making of the provincial governor Herbert. As a result, the governor compelled the prime minister Huq to resign. At the time, the BPML (the AIML's provincial branch) supported the British authorities and opposed the ministry. In addition, the constituent parties of the Progressive Coalition lost confidence in it after Jinnah disclosed Huq's desire to rejoin the AIML. Following Huq's resignation, the ministry was dissolved, and on 24 April 1943, a provincial ministry was formed under the leadership of Khwaja Nazimuddin, the leader of the BPML.

== Members ==
The cabinet consisted of the following ministers:

Portfolio	Minister	Took office	Left office	Party
Prime Minister's Office	A. K. Fazlul Huq	12 December 1941	29 March 1943	KPP
Finance Department	Shyama Prasad Mukherjee	12 December 1941	20 November 1942	HM
Agriculture and Industries Department	Khwaja Habibullah	12 December 1941	29 March 1943	KPP
Public Health and Local Self-Government Department	Santosh Kumar Bose	17 December 1941	29 March 1943	Independent
Education, Commerce and Labour Department	M. Abdul Karim	17 December 1941	29 March 1943	KPP
Revenue, Judicial and Legislative Department	Pramathanath Banerjee	17 December 1941	29 March 1943	CSP
Co-operation, Credit and Rural Indebtedness Department	Hasem Ali Khan	17 December 1941	29 March 1943	KPP
Communications and Public Works Department	Shamsuddin Ahmed	17 December 1941	29 March 1943	KPP
Forests and Excise Department	Upendranath Barman	17 December 1941	29 March 1943	INC
