= First Huq ministry =

Government of Bengal Province, British India

First Ministry of A. K. Fazlul Huq
- 1st Cabinet of Bengal Province
- 1937–1941
- Date formed: 1 April 1937
- Date dissolved: 11 December 1941

People and organisations
- Governor: Michael Knatchbull; John Herbert
- Chief Minister: A. K. Fazlul Huq
- No. of ministers: 10
- Ministers removed: 2
- Total no. of members: 12
- Member party: KPP; AIML; Independent
- Status in legislature: Majority 138 / 250 (55%)
- Opposition party: INC; Independent
- Opposition leader: Sarat Chandra Bose

History
- Election: 1937
- Legislature term: 1st Bengal Legislative Assembly
- Predecessor: Anderson
- Successor: Huq II

The first Huq ministry, also known as the Huq–Nazimuddin ministry, was the first cabinet formed in the Bengal Province, British India. It was formed in 1937 under the leadership of provincial prime minister A. K. Fazlul Huq, leader of the Krishak Praja Party (KPP), and remained in office until 1941, when it was succeeded by the Second Huq ministry.

== Background ==
In the 1937 provincial election, no party succeeded in obtaining a majority in Bengal. On the eve of the opening session of the Bengal Legislative Assembly, the Indian National Congress (INC) decided that if it failed to secure a majority in the assembly, it would not participate in the formation of a provincial ministry and would refrain from supporting any party in the assembly. On the other hand, although the INC initially promised to support the Krishak Praja Party (KPP) in forming a ministry in exchange for the implementation of some programme, this understanding later broke down. As a result, KPP leader A. K. Fazlul Huq was compelled to form a coalition ministry with the Bengal Provincial Muslim League (BPML), the KPP's rival.

== Fate ==
Due to ideological differences between the BPML and the KPP, as well as the rise of communal politics, a rift gradually developed between Huq and the BPML. At the request of the British authorities, he joined the National Defence Council, which led to a conflict with Muhammad Ali Jinnah, president of the All-India Muslim League (AIML). As a result, Huq was expelled from the AIML's central working committee, and on 1 December 1941, the BPML members resigned from his cabinet. Subsequently, Huq formed another ministry.

== Members ==
The cabinet consisted of the following ministers:

Portfolio	Minister	Took office	Left office	Party
Prime Minister's Office	A. K. Fazlul Huq	1 April 1937	11 December 1941	KPP
Home Department	Khwaja Nazimuddin	1 April 1937	1 December 1941	AIML
Revenue Department	Bijoy Prasad Singh Roy	1 April 1937	11 December 1941	Independent
Department of Public Health, Medical and Local Self-Government	Khwaja Habibullah	1 April 1937	11 December 1941	AIML
Communications and Public Works Department	Sris Chandra Nandy	1 April 1937	11 December 1941	Independent
Finance, Commerce and Labour Department	Huseyn Suhrawardy	1 April 1937	1 December 1941	AIML
Judicial and Legislative Department	Kazi Musharraf Hussain	1 April 1937	1 December 1941	AIML
Forests and Excise Department	Prasanna Deb Raikut	1 April 1937	11 December 1941	Independent
Co-operation, Credit and Rural Indebtedness Department	Mukunda Behari Mullick	1 April 1937	11 December 1941	KPP
Agriculture and Industries Department	Maulvi Tamizuddin Khan	17 November 1938	1 December 1941	KPP

== Former members ==
The following is a list of former members of the cabinet:

Portfolio	Minister	Took office	Left office
Finance Department	Nalini Ranjan Sarkar	1 April 1937	1939
Department of Public Health, Medical and Local Self-Government	Syed Nausher Ali	1 April 1937	16 November 1938
