= Suhrawardy ministry =

Fourth and last cabinet of British Bengal

Ministry of Huseyn Shaheed Suhrawardy
- 4th Cabinet of Bengal
- 1946–1947
- Date formed: 24 April 1946
- Date dissolved: 13 August 1947

People and organisations
- Governor: Frederick Burrows
- Chief Minister: Huseyn Shaheed Suhrawardy
- No. of ministers: 11
- Ministers removed: 1
- Total no. of members: 12
- Member party: AIML; Independent
- Status in legislature: Minority 113 / 250 (45%)
- Opposition cabinet: Ghosh I
- Opposition party: INC
- Opposition leader: Kiran Shankar Roy

History
- Election: 1946
- Outgoing election: 1937
- Legislature term: 2nd Bengal Legislative Assembly
- Predecessor: Nazimuddin I
- Successor: Nazimuddin II

The Suhrawardy ministry, the fourth and last cabinet of Bengal Province in British India, formed on the eve of the partition of India. It was constituted in 1946 under the leadership of Huseyn Shaheed Suhrawardy, the leader of the Bengal Provincial Muslim League (BPML) and the chief minister of Bengal, and lasted until 1947. Following the partition of Bengal, the ministry was succeeded by the First Ghosh ministry in the western part and the Second Nazimuddin ministry in the eastern part.

== Background ==
In 1943, under the leadership of Khawaja Nazimuddin, the parliamentary leader of the Bengal Provincial Muslim League (BPML), a branch of the All-India Muslim League (AIML), a provincial cabinet was formed in Bengal Province of British India. Around the same time, the Pakistan Resolution of the AIML was gaining popularity among the Muslims of the province, and the political party itself was growing in influence. Simultaneously, Nazimuddin's cabinet was increasingly criticized by the opposition for administrative corruption and failure to address the Bengal famine of 1943. As a result, Nazimuddin's influence within the BPML began to wane, while the influence of Huseyn Shaheed Suhrawardy started to rise. Although Nazimuddin's ministry enjoyed support from the British authorities, the party lost a no-confidence motion after losing 21 assembly members in 1945. Consequently, Syed Nausher Ali, the Speaker of the Bengal Legislative Assembly, declared the dissolution of the cabinet after a parliamentary vote. Although the BPML won in the 1946 Bengal Legislative Assembly election, it failed to secure an absolute majority. Despite attempting to form a coalition cabinet with the Bengal Provincial Congress (BPC), the provincial branch of the Indian National Congress (INC), the effort was unsuccessful. Eventually, on 24 April 1946, a cabinet was formed under the leadership of Suhrawardy with seven ministers. Later, on 21 November 1946, with the removal of one and the addition of four members, the cabinet was expanded and responsibilities were redistributed.

== Dissolution ==
In 1947, the INC and the AIML agreed to the partition of India, leading to the creation of the modern states of India and Pakistan. In 20 June of the same year, when an election was held regarding the second partition of Bengal, the majority of votes in the Bengal Legislative Assembly were in favor of the partition. However, at that time, Suhrawardy's cabinet remained in Calcutta, the capital of Bengal Province. In 27 June, an emergency session of the Working Committee of the BPML decided to establish the capital of the proposed Pakistani Bengal in Dacca. In 3 July, under the leadership of Prafulla Chandra Ghosh, the leader of the BPC, a shadow cabinet was formed for the future state of West Bengal. In 18 July, the Indian Independence Act was passed in the Parliament of the United Kingdom and received royal assent, clearing the way for the partition of Bengal Province into the Indian state of West Bengal and the Pakistani province of East Bengal. On 5 August 1947, Suhrawardy lost the parliamentary leadership election of the BPML by 36 votes, and Khawaja Nazimuddin was elected the new leader. On 15 August 1947, the day after Pakistan's independence, a new cabinet was formed in Dacca, the capital of the newly created province of East Bengal, under the leadership of Nazimuddin. On the other hand, following India's independence on 15 August 1947, the shadow cabinet of West Bengal became the state’s first official government.

== Members ==
The cabinet was composed of the following ministers:

Portfolio	Minister	Took office	Left office
Office of the Chief Minister	Huseyn Shaheed Suhrawardy	24 April 1946	13 August 1947
Department of Finance, Public Health, and Local Self-Government	Mohammad Ali Bogra	24 April 1946	13 August 1947
Department of Education	Syed Muazzemuddin Hossain	24 April 1946	13 August 1947
Department of Agriculture, Forests and Fisheries	Ahmed Hossain	24 April 1946	13 August 1947
Department of Civil Supplies	Abdul Gofran	24 April 1946	13 August 1947
Department of Cooperation, Loans, and Relief	Abul Fazal Muhammad Abdur Rahman	24 April 1946	13 August 1947
Department of Commerce, Labour, and Industry	Shamsuddin Ahmed	24 April 1946	13 August 1947
Department of Irrigation and Waterways	Tarak Nath Mukherjee	21 November 1946	13 August 1947
Department of Justice and Legislative Affairs	Nagendra Narayan Ray	21 November 1946	13 August 1947
Department of Land, Land Revenue, and Prisons	Fazlur Rahman	21 November 1946	13 August 1947
Department of Public Works and Housing	Dwarikanath Barori	21 November 1946	13 August 1947

== Former members ==
The list of former members of the cabinet is given below:

Portfolio	Minister	Took office	Left office
Department of Judicial and Legislative Affairs, and Public Works and Housing	Jogendra Nath Mandal	24 April 1946	21 November 1946
