= Shamsuddin Ahmed (Pakistani politician) =

Mawlawi Shamsuddin Ahmed
- শামসুদ্দিন আহমেদ

1st Pakistani Ambassador to Burma
- In office January 1948 – May 1948
- Governor General: Muhammad Ali Jinnah
- Preceded by: position established
- Succeeded by: Mohammad Ali Bogra

Commerce, Labour and Industry Minister of Bengal
- In office 24 April 1946 – 13 August 1947
- Prime Minister: Huseyn Shaheed Suhrawardy
- Governor: Frederick Burrows
- Preceded by: Khawaja Shahabuddin
- Succeeded by: position abolished

Communication and Public Works Minister of Bengal
- In office 12 December 1941 – 28 April 1943
- Prime Minister: A. K. Fazlul Huq
- Governor: John Arthur Herbert
- Preceded by: Srish Chandra Nandy
- Succeeded by: Barada Prasanna Pain

Commerce and Industry Minister of Bengal
- In office 1 April 1937 – 11 December 1941
- Prime Minister: A. K. Fazlul Huq
- Governor: Michael Knatchbull; John Arthur Herbert
- Preceded by: position established
- Succeeded by: Huseyn Shaheed Suhrawardy

Member of the Bengal Legislative Assembly for Kushtia (Muhammamadan)
- In office 1 April 1937 – 14 August 1947
- Leader: A. K. Fazlul Huq; Khawaja Nazimuddin; Huseyn Shaheed Suhrawardy
- Preceded by: position established
- Succeeded by: position dissolved

Personal details
- Born: 1889 Nadia district, Bengal Presidency, British India
- Died: 31 October 1969 (aged 79–80) Chittagong, East Pakistan, Pakistan
- Resting place: Sultanpur, Kushtia District, Bangladesh
- Party: PSP
- Other political affiliations: AIML (1944–1948); KPP (1929–1944); INC (pre-1929)
- Education: LL.B.; M.A. in Arts
- Alma mater: University of Calcutta
- Occupation: Lawyer

Shamsuddin Ahmed (1889–1969) was a prominent leader of the Bhanubil Krishak Praja Movement and a lawyer and politician in British-ruled India and post-independence Pakistan.

== Early life ==
Shamsuddin Ahmed was born in 1889 in the village of Sultanpur, under Kumarkhali thana in the Kushtia subdivision of Nadia district, Bengal Presidency, British India. After passing the matriculation examination from Hooghly Collegiate School in 1910, he enrolled at Presidency College in Calcutta and earned his undergraduate degree from there. Six years after completing matriculation, he obtained a postgraduate degree in Arts and a bachelor's degree in Law from the University of Calcutta.

== Career ==
Ahmed began his professional career in 1917 as a lawyer at the district court of Krishnanagar. Two years later, in 1919, he started practicing at the Calcutta High Court, where he worked as an assistant to Chittaranjan Das. From 1921 to 1925, he served as the secretary of the Bengal Provincial Congress Committee, and in the 1926 Indian provincial elections, he was elected as a member of the Bengal Legislative Council. However, in 1929, he left the Indian National Congress (INC) and joined the All-Bengal Tenant Association, where he served as the joint secretary. In 1933, he was elected commissioner of the Calcutta Municipal Corporation and held the position for three years. In the 1937 Bengal Legislative Assembly election, he won a seat and became a legislative assembly member representing the Krishak Praja Party (KPP). He was appointed minister of commerce and industry in the First Huq ministry. In 1941, he became minister of communication and public works in the Second Huq ministry. In 1944, he left the KPP and joined the All-India Muslim League (AIML). In 1946, he joined the Suhrawardy ministry and was appointed minister of commerce, labour, and industry. After the independence of Pakistan in 1947, the Pakistani government appointed Ahmed as the newly formed state's first ambassador to Burma. Later, he became one of the founders and chairman of East Pakistan branch of the Pakistan Socialist Party (PSP). In the post-independence period, he also worked as a lawyer at the Dacca High Court.

== Family, legacy, and death ==
His elder brother was Mawlawi Afsar Uddin, a philanthropist and social activist. In 1946, Ahmed founded Kushtia College and the Kushtia Alia Madrasa. He died on 31 October 1969 in Chittagong, East Pakistan, Pakistan at the residence of his son-in-law Bazlus Sattar, a politician affiliated with the National Awami Party (Bhasani).
