= Hamiduddin Ahmad Khan =

Pakistani lawyer and provincial minister of East Bengal

Khan Bahadur Hamiduddin Ahmad Khan
- হামিদুদ্দিন আহমদ খাঁ

Provincial Minister of East Bengal
- In office 1950–1953
- Leader: Nurul Amin
- Portfolio: Agriculture
- Preceded by: office established
- Succeeded by: Yusuf Ali Chowdhury

Personal details
- Born: Hamiduddin Ahmad; 1898 (age 127–128) Boalia, Mymensingh District, Bengal Presidency, British India
- Party: PML
- Other political affiliations: AIML
- Education: Ripon College
- Occupation: Lawyer

Khan Bahadur Maulvi Hamiduddin Ahmad Khan (1898 – date of death unknown) was a Pakistani lawyer and politician who served as Provincial Minister of Agriculture of East Bengal from 1950 to 1953. Born in the Mymensingh District of Bengal Presidency, he was a member of the All-India Muslim League and later the Pakistan Muslim League. He served as a member of the Bengal Legislative Assembly from 1937 to 1947 and held several administrative and parliamentary positions during both the British and early Pakistani periods.

== Early life and education ==
Hamiduddin Ahmad Khan was born in 1898 in Boalia, Mymensingh District, Bengal Presidency, British India, in the area corresponding to present-day Katiadi Upazila, Kishoreganj District, Bangladesh. He passed the matriculation examination in 1916 and obtained a bachelor's degree from the University of Calcutta in 1920. In 1925, he obtained a Bachelor of Laws degree from Ripon College, Calcutta, following which he entered the legal profession.

== Career ==
In 1930, Hamiduddin Ahmad Khan became a member of the Mymensingh District Board. He was elected a member of the Bengal Legislative Assembly in 1937 and served in that capacity until 1947. In 1940, he was appointed chairman of the Bajitpur Municipality, a position he held until 1950. He retired from the legal profession in 1943.

During the First Nazimuddin ministry in 1943, he served as parliamentary secretary of the Local Autonomy Department of Bengal Province under British administration. In 1947, during the Suhrawardy ministry, he served as parliamentary secretary of the province's Home and Revenue Departments.

Following the independence of Pakistan, he was appointed Minister of Agriculture of East Bengal in 1950 as a member of the Amin ministry. He served in that role until 1953.

== Legacy ==
Khan donated land in Mymensingh for Mymensingh City College and was associated with its renaming in honour of its founder Anandamohan Bose in 1908.
