= Independent Scheduled Caste Party =

Independent Scheduled Caste Party Independent Scheduled Caste Party
- President: Hemchandra Naskar
- General Secretary: Jogendranath Mandal
- Founded: 1938
- Dissolved: 1943
- Preceded by: Calcutta Scheduled Caste League
- Merged into: Bengal Provincial Scheduled Caste Federation
- Ideology: Securing the rights of the Namasudras
- Religion: Hinduism
- It was not a conventional political party; rather, it was a parliamentary group of elected legislators.

The Independent Scheduled Caste Party was a parliamentary group in the Bengal Presidency of British India. The party was formed in 1938 by Hindu lower-caste legislators elected in the Bengal Legislative Assembly elections of 1937.

This election is regarded as highly significant for the lower-caste Hindus. For the first time in the history of India, they contested not only in reserved seats but also in general seats; some were even elected from general constituencies.

== Background ==
In the 1930s, when A. K. Fazlul Huq undertook various programs to secure the rights of peasants, the lower-caste Hindu Namasudra community supported the Krishak Praja Party. Under its leadership, both Muslim and Namasudra peasants became organized. However, ahead of the 1937 Bengal Legislative Assembly elections, the Krishak Praja Party allied only with the Muslim League to contest the Muslim-reserved seats, which compelled the Namasudras to contest independently.

Most of the reserved seats for lower caste Namasudras were won by non-Congress independent Namasudra candidates. In a general seat (unreserved) in Bakarganj district (present-day Barisal Division), dominated by Namasudras, an independent candidate named Jogendra Nath Mandal—a nephew and political successor of Ashwini Kumar Dutta—defeated the Congress nominee, a Kayastha candidate named Saral Dutta. Besides him, several influential Namasudra leaders were elected from reserved seats. Among the 32 elected Scheduled Caste Namasudra members of the Bengal Legislative Council, 23 had been elected as independents. In addition, 7 were elected from the Congress, and 2 from the Hindu Mahasabha.

== Formation ==
Since most leaders of the Congress were upper caste Hindus, the Namasudras had kept a distance until 1937. Therefore, after the elections, the elected representatives from reserved seats supported the Muslim League–Krishak Praja Party coalition ministry led by A. K. Fazlul Huq. From among the Namasudras, Mukund Bihari Mallick was appointed Minister of Cooperative Credit and Rural Indebtedness. However, the functioning of this ministry failed to satisfy the Namasudras, leading to disillusionment. They even began openly criticizing their own minister, Mukund Bihari Mallick. Taking advantage of this, the Congress sought to improve its relations with the Namasudras.

A bridge between the two groups was built by the "Calcutta Scheduled Caste League," founded in 1937. A prominent leader of this organization was Pramatha Ranjan Thakur, grandson of Guruchand Thakur, a noted Namasudra leader. Later, under the direct influence of the Congress, particularly through the efforts of Subhas Chandra Bose and Sarat Chandra Bose, the foundation of this party was laid at a meeting at Albert Hall in Kolkata on 13 March 1938. Three days later, on 16 March, a meeting was held at the residence of Sarat Bose, attended by Jogendranath Mandal, Pramatha Ranjan Thakur, and a total of 20 Namasudra legislators and Congress leaders. In that meeting, they decided to withdraw their support from the Krishak Praja Party–Muslim League coalition government and extend support to the Congress. On the same day, 16 March 1938, in that very meeting, they formed a parliamentary group called the Independent Scheduled Caste Party.

== Later activities ==
From its inception, the party maintained close ties with the ‘Scheduled Caste Movement’ founded by B. R. Ambedkar. The party also worked to secure the rights of the Dalit community. However, despite reaching compromises with the Congress for political stability, it simultaneously maintained political relations with the Muslim League. When the second ministry of A. K. Fazlul Huq (the Shyama-Huq ministry) collapsed, they supported the Nazimuddin ministry. Members of the Independent Scheduled Caste Party—Prem Hari Barman, Pulin Bihari Mallick (Publicity), and Jogendranath Mandal (Cooperation, Credit, and Rural Development)—were appointed as ministers.

== Dissolution ==
In 1943, leaders of the Dalit community came together to form a mainstream political party across Bengal, the Bengal Provincial Scheduled Caste Federation. As a result, most members of the Independent Scheduled Caste Party favored joining that organization. Consequently, in 1943 the party merged with the Bengal Provincial Scheduled Caste Federation.
