= List of cabinets of Bengal =

The following is a list of the cabinets of Bengal (present-day People's Republic of Bangladesh and West Bengal), which was a province of the British India from 1936 to 1947:

== List ==
No.	Name	Formation	Election	Party	System	Source
1	Huq I	1937	1937	KPP	Parliamentary	
2	Huq II	1941	-	KPP	Parliamentary	
3	Nazimuddin I	1943	-	BPML	Parliamentary	
4	Suhrawardy	24 April 1946	1946	BPML	Parliamentary	

== See also ==
- List of cabinets of East Bengal
- List of cabinets of West Bengal
