= Syed Abdus Salim =

- সৈয়দ আবদুস সলিম

Provincial Minister of Commerce, Labour and Industries of East Bengal
- In office 1949–1954
- Prime Minister: Nurul Amin
- Preceded by: Hamidul Huq Choudhury
- Succeeded by: Abu Hussain Sarkar; Abdus Salam Khan

Personal details
- Born: 1905 Dacca, Eastern Bengal and Assam, British India
- Died: 28 December 1967 (aged 61–62) Dacca, East Pakistan, Pakistan
- Party: PML
- Other political affiliations: AIML
- Occupation: official

Syed Abdus Salim (Bengali: সৈয়দ আবদুস সলিম; 1905–1967) was a Pakistani official and politician.

Salim, a member of Machang's Syed family, was born in 1905 at the Ahsan Manzil, Dhaka, Eastern Bengal and Assam, British India. His father, Syed Abdul Aziz, was the zamindar of Machang. Salim became a municipal commissioner of the Dhaka Municipality in 1920. In 1928, the government appointed him as an honorary magistrate of Dhaka District. He served as the deputy chairman of the Dhaka Central Cooperative Bank in 1934, as its chairman in 1938, and later as a director of the Bengal Central Cooperative Bank. In the 1937 Bengal Legislative Assembly election, he contested and elected as a member of the Bengal Legislative Assembly. In 1940, he became chairman of the Dacca District Board. In the same year, he was elected secretary of the Dhaka District Muslim League for a term of four years. Later, in 1946, he contested in the 1946 Bengal Legislative Assembly election and elected as a member of the legislative assembly. During the Suhrawardy cabinet, he was a parliamentary secretary. In 1947, after independence of Pakistan, his tenure as Dhaka District Board's Chairmanship ended and he became member of the East Bengal Legislative Assembly. In 1948, he was appointed a director of the East Bengal Central Cooperative Bank. In 1949, he was made the provincial commerce, labour and industries minister of East Bengal and he continued this responsibility till 1954. He was the chairman of Pakistan Tea Board. He died on 28 December 1967 in Dhaka Medical College Hospital, Dhaka, East Pakistan, Pakistan.
