= First Ghosh ministry =

1947–48 government of West Bengal, India

First Ministry of Prafulla Chandra Ghose
- 1st Ministry of West Bengal
- 1947–1948
- Date formed: 3 July 1947
- Date dissolved: 22 January 1948

People and organisations
- Governor: Chakravarti Rajagopalachari
- Prime Minister: Prafulla Chandra Ghosh
- No. of ministers: 9
- Ministers removed: 4
- Total no. of members: 13
- Member party: INC
- Status in legislature: Majority 83 / 90 (92%)
- Opposition party: CPI; AIML; Independent

History
- Election: 1946
- Outgoing election: 1937
- Legislature term: 1st West Bengal Assembly
- Predecessor: Suhrawardy
- Successor: Roy I

The 1st Council of Ministers for the state of West Bengal was formed under the leadership of Prafulla Chandra Ghosh. He was sworn in as Prime Minister of West Bengal for the first time on 15 August 1947, although the cabinet was sworn in on 3 July 1947.

== Background ==
During 1940s, the Pakistan Resolution of the All-India Muslim League (AIML) was gaining popularity among the Muslims of the Bengal Province of British India, and the political party itself was growing in influence. The party won in the 1946 Bengal Legislative Assembly election, and on 24 April 1946, Suhrawardy ministry was formed under the leadership of Huseyn Shaheed Suhrawardy, leader of the party's provincial branch. In 1947, the Indian National Congress (INC) and the AIML agreed to the partition of India, leading to the creation of the modern states of India and Pakistan. In 20 June of the same year, when an election was held regarding the second partition of Bengal, the majority of votes in the Bengal Legislative Assembly were in favor of the partition. However, at that time, Suhrawardy's cabinet remained in Calcutta, the capital of Bengal Province. In 3 July, under the leadership of Prafulla Chandra Ghosh, the leader of the provincial branch of the INC, a shadow cabinet was formed for the future state of West Bengal. In 18 July, the Indian Independence Act was passed in the Parliament of the United Kingdom and received royal assent, clearing the way for the partition of Bengal Province into the Indian state of West Bengal and the Pakistani province of East Bengal. On 15 August 1947, following India's independence, the shadow cabinet of West Bengal became the state's first official government.

== Dissolution ==
In December 1947, members of the West Bengal Legislative Assembly expressed their no-confidence in him and signed a paper demanding Bidhan Chandra Roy as the new leader of the West Bengal Provincial Congress Party, which was given to Ghosh by Ghanshyam Das Birla. After losing support, Ghosh stepped down as the leader of the Provincial Congress Party on 15 January 1948 and resigned from the post of prime minister six days later. Roy succeeded Ghosh as the new leader of the Provincial Congress Party and the new prime minister of West Bengal. On 23 January 1948, Ghosh's cabinet was replaced by First Roy ministry.

== Members ==
The cabinet was composed of the following ministers:

Portfolio	Minister	Took office	Left office
Office of the Prime Minister	Prafulla Chandra Ghosh	3 July 1947	22 January 1948
Department of Finance, Health and Local Self-Government	Ananda Prasad Chowdhury		22 January 1948
Department of Commerce, Labor and Education	Suresh Chandra Banerjee	3 July 1947	22 January 1948
Department of Land and Revenue	Kalipada Mukherjee	3 July 1947	22 January 1948
Department of Agriculture, Forest and Fisheries	Hem Chandra Naskar	3 July 1947	22 January 1948
Department of Cooperatives, Loans and Relief	Kamal Krishna Roy	3 July 1947	22 January 1948
Department of Irrigation, Works, Housing and Waterways	Bhupati Majumdar		22 January 1948
Department of Civil Supplies	Charu Chandra Bhandari		22 January 1948
Department of Justice and Law	Mohini Mohan Burman	3 July 1947	22 January 1948

== Former members ==
Portfolio	Minister	Took office	Left office	Ref
Department of Finance	Jadvendra Nath Panja	3 July 1947	N/A	
Department of Health	Bimal Chandra Sinha	4 July 1947	N/A	
Department of Civil Supplies	Radha Nath Das	3 July 1947	N/A	
Department of Irrigation, Works, Housing and Waterways	Nikunja Behari Maity	3 July 1947	N/A	
