= Dwarikanath Barori =

Bangladeshi politician

- দ্বারিকানাথ বারুরী

Provincial Minister of East Bengal
- In office 1950–1953
- Leader: Nurul Amin
- Portfolio: Rural Development and Cooperatives
- Preceded by: office established
- Succeeded by: Sheikh Mujibur Rahman

Provincial Minister of Bengal
- In office 1946–1947
- Leader: Huseyn Suhrawardy
- Portfolio: Public Works and Housing
- Preceded by: Barada Prasanna Pain
- Succeeded by: office abolished

Personal details
- Born: 1907 Faridpur District, Eastern Bengal and Assam, British India
- Died: 1986 (aged 78–79) Madaripur, Bangladesh
- Party: EBSCF (1947–1958)
- Other political affiliations: AISCF (1946–1947); INC (pre-1946)
- Occupation: Lawyer

Dwarikanath Barori (1907–1986) was a Bangladeshi lawyer and Scheduled Caste politician. He served as a provincial minister of Bengal in British India and later of East Bengal under Pakistan.

== Early life ==
Barori was born in 1907 in Madaripur Subdivision, Faridpur District, Eastern Bengal and Assam, British India (present-day Rajoir Upazila, Madaripur District, Bangladesh). He was a member of the Faridpur branch of the anti-colonial secret organisation Jugantar.

== Political career ==
=== Pre-independence ===
Barori began his political career by joining the Indian National Congress (INC). In 1946, he was elected a member of the Bengal Legislative Assembly from a Scheduled Caste constituency in Faridpur. In the same year, he was expelled from the INC, after which he joined the All India Scheduled Caste Federation (AISCF). He was appointed a minister of Bengal Province as a member of the Suhrawardy ministry, led by the All-India Muslim League (AIML). In 1947, in the Bengal Legislative Assembly, he voted in favour of the partition of India and in favour of including Bengal in the proposed state of Pakistan. During the Sylhet referendum, he worked on behalf of the AIML.

=== East Bengal, Pakistan ===
After the independence of Pakistan, the East Bengal Scheduled Castes Federation (EBSCF) was formed in the newly established country, and Barori became its president. In 1950, he was appointed provincial minister of East Bengal as a member of the Amin ministry. The EBSCF subsequently split over the issue of a separate electoral system, dividing into two factions led respectively by Barori and Rasaraj Mandal. In the 1954 legislative election, Barori's faction was completely defeated. In 1960, he was appointed a member of the Constitution Commission formed to propose the new constitution.

== Personal life and death ==
Mrinal Kanti Barori, a leftist politician and revolutionary from Madaripur, was his son. Barori died in Madaripur, Bangladesh, in 1986.
