= Prime Minister of Bengal =

Head of government of Bengal Province in British India

- Badge of Bengal

- Flag of British Bengal

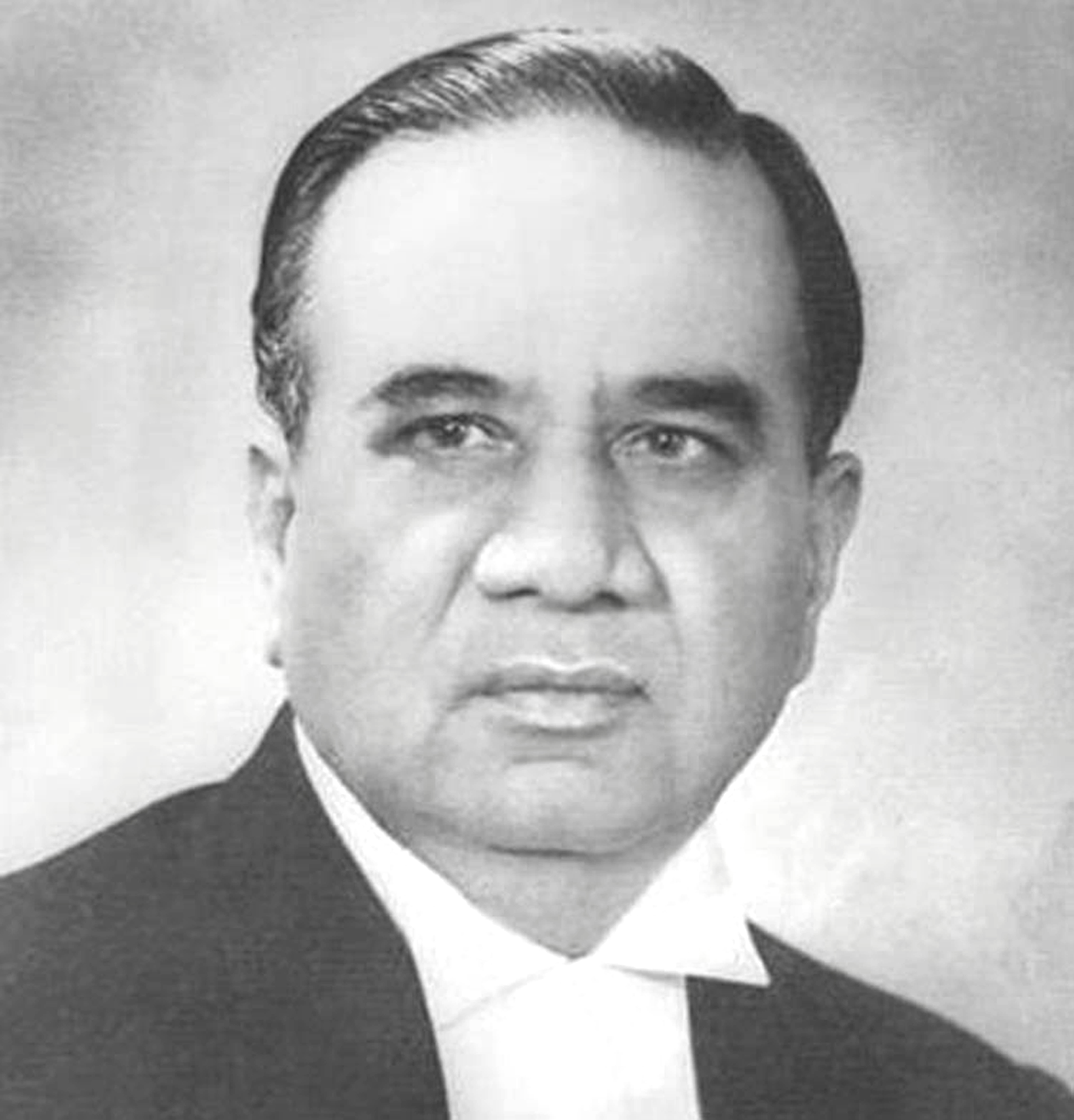
- Huseyn Shaheed Suhrawardy; Last in Office
- Style: The Honourable
- Appointer: Governor of Bengal
- Formation: 1 April 1937
- First holder: A. K. Fazlul Huq
- Final holder: H. S. Suhrawardy
- Abolished: 15 August 1947
- Succession: Chief Minister of West Bengal, India; Chief Minister of East Bengal, Pakistan

The prime minister of Bengal was the head of government of Bengal Province and the Leader of the House in the Bengal Legislative Assembly in British India. The position was dissolved upon the Partition of Bengal during the partition of India in 1947.

== History ==
The office was created under the Government of India Act 1935, which granted Bengal a bicameral legislature, including the Bengal Legislative Council and the Bengal Legislative Assembly. The prime minister was in charge of the executive branch. The prime minister of Bengal played an important role in pan-Indian politics, including proclaiming the Lahore Resolution and dealing with Japanese attacks during World War II.

The Congress party boycotted the office due to its anti-British policy. The office was held by three Muslims. The first premier was A. K. Fazlul Huq, the leader of the anti-feudalist Krishak Praja Party. Huq formed his first government with the All India Muslim League in 1937. The League withdrew support in 1941, after which Huq forged a coalition with the Hindu Mahasabha led by Syama Prasad Mukherjee. The Huq-Syama coalition lasted till 1943. Huq was succeeded by a Muslim League ministry led by Sir Khawaja Nazimuddin. A conservative figure, the Nazimuddin ministry lasted till 1945, when governor's rule was imposed. The next election saw H. S. Suhrawardy lead the Muslim League to a majority. Suhrawardy sought an undivided Bengal with support from Hindu leaders and the British governor; but faced challenges like the Noakhali riots, Direct Action Day and the idea was also rejected by the All India Congress party who called for partitioning of Bengal.

== List of prime ministers of Bengal (1937–1947) ==
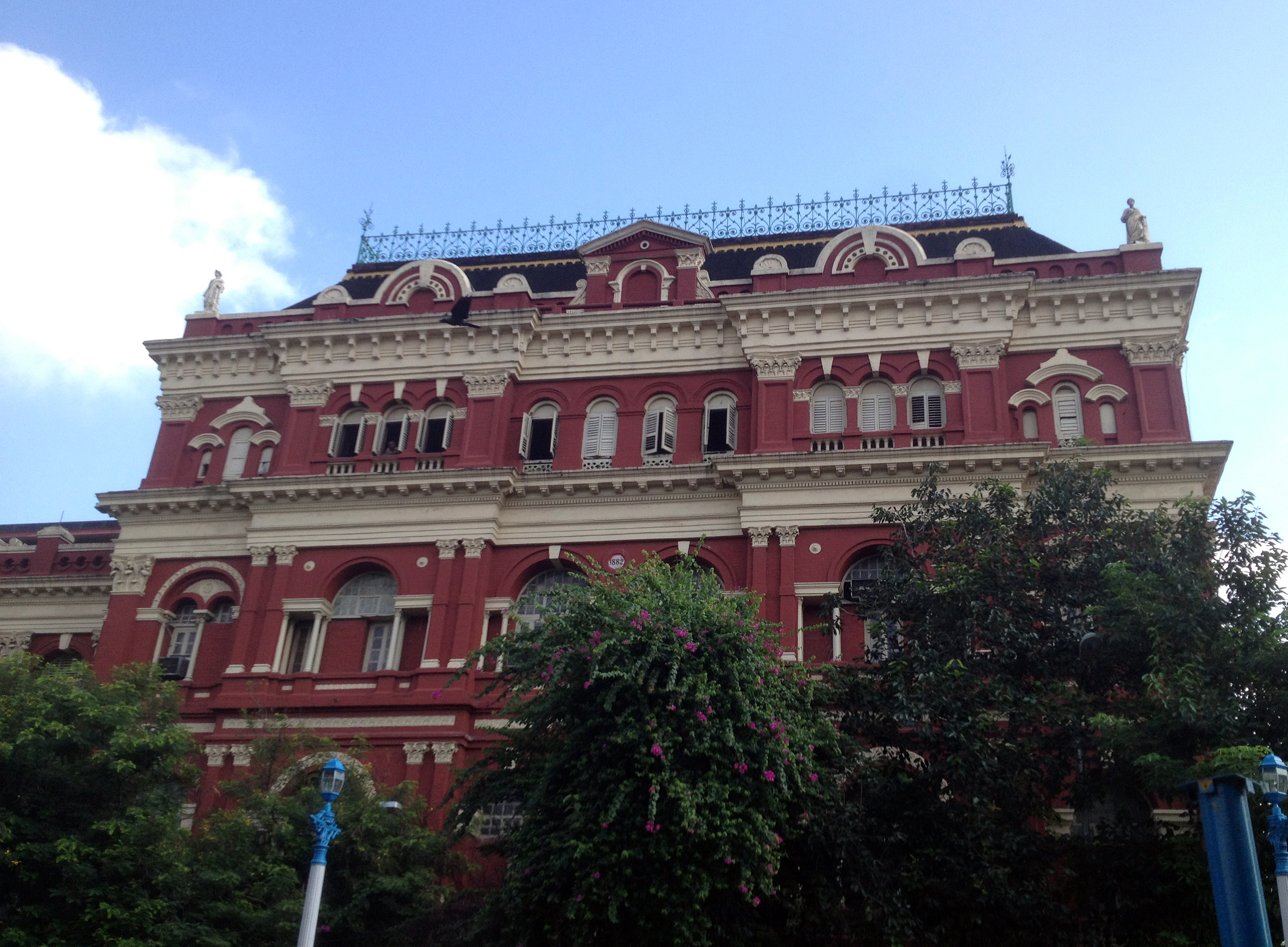
Writer's Building in Kolkata, the former seat of the Government of Bengal Province

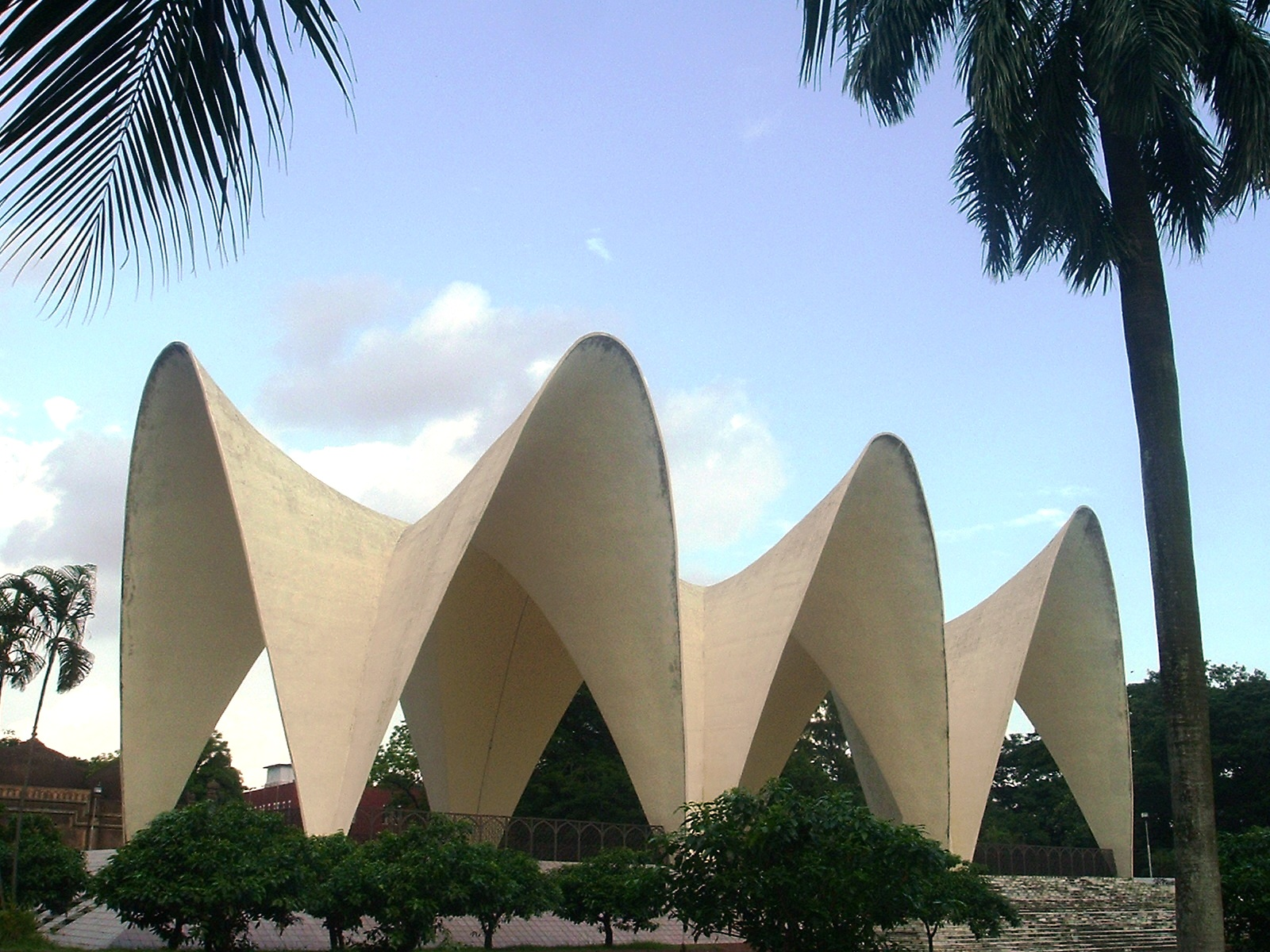
The mausoleum of Huq, Nazimuddin and Suhrawardy in Dhaka

No	Name	Portrait	Tenure			Party (coalition partner)	Assembly	Appointed by (Governor)
No	Name	Portrait	Took office	Left office	Term	Party (coalition partner)	Assembly	Appointed by (Governor)
1	Abul Kasem Fazlul Huq		1 April 1937	1 December 1941	4 years, 244 days	Krishak Praja Party (Muslim League)	1st Assembly (1937 election)	Sir John Anderson
1	Abul Kasem Fazlul Huq		12 December 1941	29 March 1943	1 year, 107 days	Krishak Praja Party (Hindu Mahasabha)	1st Assembly (1937 election)	Sir John Arthur Herbert
2	Sir Khawaja Nazimuddin		29 April 1943	31 March 1945	1 year, 336 days	Muslim League	1st Assembly (1937 election)	Sir John Arthur Herbert
-	Vacant (Governor's rule)		1 April 1945	22 April 1946	1 year, 21 days	N/A	Dissolved	-
3	Huseyn Shaheed Suhrawardy		23 April 1946	14 August 1947	1 year, 114 days	Muslim League	2nd Assembly (1946 election)	Sir Frederick Burrows

== Legacy ==
When Bengal was partitioned, the office was succeeded by the chief minister of West Bengal and the chief minister of East Bengal.

All three Bengali premiers moved to East Bengal, where they continued to be influential statesmen. Nazimuddin served as East Bengal's chief minister, and later became governor general and prime minister of Pakistan, Suhrawardy became a prime minister of Pakistan, while Huq served as East Bengal's chief minister, and later as East Pakistan's governor. The three premiers are considered the forerunners of politics in modern Bangladesh.

== See also ==
- List of cabinets of Bengal
- Prime Minister of Bangladesh
