= Charu Chandra Bhandari =

Indian Independence activist and politician (1896–1985)

Charuchandra Bhandari
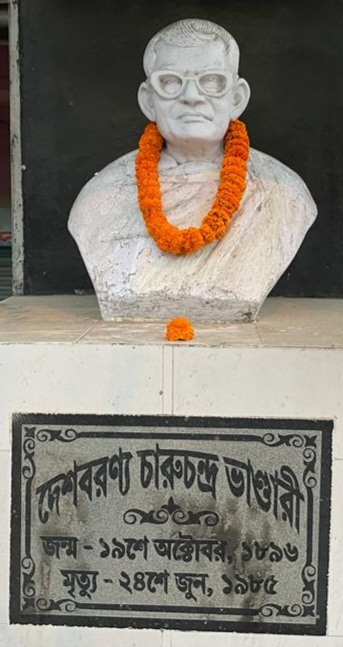
- A bust statue of Charuchandra Bhandari in Diamond Harbour municipality
- Born: 19 October 1896; Diamond Harbour, 24 Parganas, British India
- Died: 24 June 1985 (aged 88); Diamond Harbour, South 24 Parganas
- Occupations: Lawyer, Independence activist, Politician
- Spouse: Pravanalini Bhandari

Charu Chandra Bhandari (19 October 1896 – 24 June 1985) was an independence activist, lawyer, Gandhian and a leader of the Sarvodaya Movement. He was the chief propagator of the Sarvodaya movement in Bengal as a close associate of Acharya Vinoba Bhave and took an active part in the Bhoodan movement.

== Birth and early life ==
Charu Chandra Bhandari was born on 19 October 1896 in Shyambasur Chak village in an affluent Bengali Mahishya family to Jogendranath Bhandari and Sailabala Debi under Kulpi police station in Diamond Harbour subdivision of South 24 Parganas, British India (present day West Bengal, India). His schooling was from Hatuganj high school and subsequently he completed his I.A from Ashutosh College and B.A from Ripon College, Calcutta. Thereafter, he completed his M.A in Economics and also, LLB from the University of Calcutta. He was a lawyer by profession.

== Activities ==
When the Salt Satyagraha movement started across the country in 1930, Charuchandra Bhandari led the movement in South Bengal and the Sundarbans under the instructions of Mahatma Gandhi . He left his profession of lawyer and completely joined the freedom struggle. Charuchandra was even caught by the police for participating in the salt satyagraha. After his release from jail, Khadi temples were built in various places of Sundarbans including Hatugunj, Diamond Harbour, Kulpi, Karanjali, Harinavi in South 24 Parganas. Freedom fighter Bishwaranjan Sen was one of his collaborators in the establishment of the Khadi Mandir in Diamond Harbour. Clothes by spinning wheels were manufactured here and were distributed in 24 Parganas and neighbouring districts for sale.

Charuchandra was closely associated with the organizational and service work of Mahatma Gandhi's movement. He was also associated with the Abhay Ashram, which was inspired by Gandhian ideals and was founded in Comilla, Bengal (present-day Bangladesh).

Charuchandra Bhandari was a notable disciple of Acharya Vinoba Bhave. Charuchandra was one of the main promoters of his Sarvodaya movement in West Bengal. According to him, co-operation is the basic principle of the village donation and land donation movement (Bhoodan movement). Charuchandra Bhandari tried his best to make the principles of Vinoba Bhave a reality. He along with many others took a life vow at the Sarvodaya conference held in Gaya. He founded the West Bengal Bhudajajna Mandal at Diamond Harbour.

Charuchandra Bhandari was a member of the Bengal Legislative Assembly. On June 20, 1947, he advocated for the establishment of West Bengal. In the first general election of independent India in 1951, Charuchandra Bhandari was elected from the Diamond Harbour Assembly constituency as a member of the Kisan Mazdoor Praja Party(KMPP). He became the first minister of food and civil supplies in Prafulla Chandra Ghosh's first cabinet.

== Books written ==
- Bhūdānajajña ki ō kēna (1955)(What and Why Land donation movement)
- Āmādēra jātīẏa śikṣā (1962)(Our National Education)
- Kōra-āna sāra (Essence of Quran)
- Āsāmēra aśānti prasaṅgē (1961)
- Thoughts on Assam Disturbances (1961)

== Death and legacy ==
Charuchandra Bhandari died on June 24, 1985. After his death, the Charuchandra Memorial Committee was formed in his memory at Diamond Harbour. The 'Girls School Road' in ward number 13 of Diamond Harbour city has been named 'Charuchandra Bhandari Sarani' by the municipality and a bust statue of Charuchandra Bhandari has been installed at the intersection of Diamond Harbor Main Road and Charuchandra Bhandari Sarani.
