= Mukunda Behari Mullick =

Indian lawyer

- Born: 27 December 1888; Bagerhat Upzila, Khulna Division, Bengal Presidency, British India
- Died: 4 August 1974 (aged 85); Calcutta, West Bengal, India
- Education: B.A, LLB and M.A (Pali)
- Alma mater: University of Calcutta
- Occupation: Lawyer
- Organization: Bengal Depressed Classes Association
- Political party: Krishak Praja Party
- Movement: Dalit liberation movement of Bengal

Mukunda Behari Mullick (1888–1974) was an Indian lawyer, reformer, professor and politician.

== Career ==
He enrolled as a lawyer in 1914 at Calcutta High Court and worked as lecturer of Pali and part-time lecturer of law at University of Calcutta.

In 1912 he founded Bengal Namasudra Association and held many conferences to mobilize Chandalas of Bengal under one umbrella. In 1925 he formed the Bengal Depressed Classes Association and was chosen as its first president. In 1929 both organisations formed a joint delegation and gave oral evidence to Simon Commission regarding their support to the commission.

He fought 1921 and 1925 elections from Khulna constituency as independent candidate but lost. Then he was nominated as member of Bengal Legislative Council and re-elected in 1937 elections then became minister of Cooperative Credit & Rural Indebtedness in first A.K Fazlul Haq 's govt. In 1942 he became Chairman of Coal Mines Stowing Board. He voted in favour of Dr. B.R. Ambedkar in 1946 Indian general elections.

In 1942 Mullick founded Bengal Scheduled Castes Party with his brother Pulinda Behari Mullick and it created two factions among Dalits, another being led by Jogendra Nath Mandal of Bengal Scheduled Caste League.
