= Prem Hari Barma =

Bengali politician

Prem Hari Barma (Bengali: প্রেমহরি বর্মন) was a Bengali politician, and former leader of the Scheduled Castes and Tribes in Dinajpur, East Bengal.

== Biography ==
Barma was born to a Hindu family in Dinajpur, Bengal Presidency. He was the first lawyer from a Scheduled Castes and Tribes background. In 1936, Barma was elected to the Bengal Legislative Assembly from Dinajpur. He became a minister at the Bengal Legislative Council in 1942. During the 1946 Bengal Legislative Assembly election, he successfully won, representing the Scheduled Castes and Tribes in partnership with the Muslim League. The following year, he became a member of the 1st National Assembly of Pakistan. He advocated for a secular constitution of Pakistan.
