= Hassan Ali (East Pakistan politician) =

Bengali politician

- হাসান আলী

Member of the Provincial Assembly of East Pakistan
- In office 1948–1954
- Succeeded by: Constituency abolished
- Constituency: Dinajpur-cum-Thakurgaon

Member of the Bengal Legislative Assembly
- In office 1946–1947
- Preceded by: Mahtabuddin Ahmad
- Succeeded by: Assembly abolished
- Constituency: Dinajpur Central West (Rural) Muhammadan

Personal details
- Born: Nimnagar, Dinajpur District, Bengal Presidency
- Died: 1985 Bangladesh
- Party: All-India Muslim League
- Education: University of Calcutta

Hassan Ali was a Member of the 3rd National Assembly of Pakistan as a representative of East Pakistan.

== Early life and education ==
Ali was born in the village of Nimnagar in Dinajpur, Bengal Presidency. He studied law at the University of Calcutta and was the first Dinajpuri Muslim to be awarded a Master of Arts.

== Career ==
Ali was the president of the undivided Dinajpur district Muslim League for a long time. He was elected at the 1946 Bengal Legislative Assembly election as a Muslim League candidate from Dinajpur, defeating rival Fazle Haq Mahabbatpuri. After the Partition of Bengal (1947), he served as a provincial minister at the East Bengal Legislative Assembly. Ali had also served as chairman of the Dinajpur district board, the president of Dinajpur High Madrasa, principal of the law college, and the editor of the monthly Nawruz newspaper. Ali was a Member of the 3rd National Assembly of Pakistan representing Dinajpur-II.

A meeting was held under the chairmanship of the then Deputy Commissioner Abdur Rab Chowdhury in which Ali was present. It was decided in the meeting that Ali was to be part of a 5-member managing committee for the Collegiate Girls High School and College, Dinajpur. Due to some complications with the newly appointed headmaster Mir Mosharraf Hossain and delay in shifting Surendranath College, Collegiate Girls School was established on 10 March 1967 instead of January with the sincere efforts of the Deputy Commissioner of Dinajpur, Dinajpur Women's College authorities and local education enthusiasts. The then MLA Hasan Ali SPK inaugurated the school on that day. In 1968, it received academic recognition as a secondary school from the Rajshahi Education Board.

== Death ==
He died in 1985. The Dinajpur District Board named the Hasan Ali Hall in his honor.
