= Tarak Nath Mukherjee =

Bengali politician

Tarak Nath Mukherjee, MBE, was a Bengali politician, and the Minister of Irrigation and Waterways in the second cabinet of Prime Minister of Bengal H. S. Suhrawardy from 23 April 1946 to 14 August 1947. He was the grandson of Raja Peary Mohan Mukherjee. He was the vice-chairman of the Howrah District Board.
