= Syed Nausher Ali =

Indian politician (1891–1972)

Member of the Bengal Legislative Assembly
- In office 1937–1945
- Succeeded by: Lutfar Rahman
- Constituency: Jessore Sadar

Personal details
- Born: 1891 Narail, Bengal Presidency, British India
- Died: 6 April 1972 (aged 80–81) West Bengal, India
- Party: Krishak Praja Party; Indian National Congress
- Education: Daulatpur College; Daulatpur High School
- Alma mater: University of Calcutta (BL); Calcutta City College

Syed Nausher Ali (1891 – 6 April 1972) was an Indian left-leaning politician in West and East Bengal (now India and Bangladesh) during British rule. He was a cabinet member in the first A. K. Fazlul Huq ministry and later the Speaker of the Legislative Assembly in the second coalition Ministry. He was renowned for his advocacy of abolition of British imperialism and his support of Hindu-Muslim cooperation in the form of an undivided India.

== Early life ==
Syed Nausher Ali was born in Narail in 1891 in an affluent family. He had his early education in Khulna and later moved to Calcutta for his higher education and obtained his bachelor's degree and a law degree from Calcutta University. He joined the Calcutta High Court Bar in 1921. Ali was elected as a member of the Bengal Legislative Assembly in 1921 and 1936 he joined the Krishak Praja Party (KPP).

In 1937, when A. K. Fazlul Huq formed a coalition government with the All-India Muslim League, Nausher Ali was the only other KPP representative in the joint cabinet. He served as the Minister of the Health Department and was also responsible for the Local Self-Government Department. During his tenure as a minister, Nausher Ali came under the spotlight for appointing Muslim candidates in the open posts. This led to internal political tensions among the members of the joint cabinet and as a result, when the government was reconstituted after 1938, Ali was left out of the cabinet.

In 1939, Ali formally joined the Congress. To assist Congress' campaign, Ali organized meetings with peasants in the districts of Khulna and Jessore, attacking the zamindars and supporters of British imperialism and organizing means to empower peasants by encouraging them not to pay rent to the government. In 1942 when Fazlul Huq formed the second coalition Ministry, Syed Nausher Ali became the Speaker of the Legislative Assembly from 1 March 1943 to 14 May 1946.

== Later life ==
In the 1940s, Muslim opinion in Bengal turned in favor of a Pakistan independent of India. Syed Nausher Ali, however, continued to voice his support for the unity of India. During the election of 1945–46, he was one of the only two Muslim candidates from the Indian National Congress in Bengal. After 1947 he decided to stay in India and became a Muslim politician in West Bengal. He died on 6 April 1972.
