= Bengal Provincial Muslim League =

Branch of the All India Muslim League in British Indian Bengal (1912–1947)

- Former provincial party
- Founded: 1912
- Dissolved: 1947
- Ideology: Constitutionalism; Muslim nationalism in South Asia; Civil rights for Bengali Muslims
- Political position: Centre-right
- National affiliation: All-India Muslim League

The Bengal Provincial Muslim League (BPML) was the branch of the All India Muslim League in the British Indian province of Bengal. It was established in Dhaka on 2 March 1912. Its official language was Bengali. The party played an important role in the Bengal Legislative Council and in the Bengal Legislative Assembly, where two of the Prime Ministers of Bengal were from the party. It was vital to the creation of the Dominion of Pakistan, particularly after its election victory in 1946.

In 1929, a faction of the party broke away to form the Praja Party. Members of the BPML later became prominent political leaders in Pakistan and Bangladesh, serving in offices including Prime Minister of Pakistan (Sir Khawaja Nazimuddin, Mohammad Ali of Bogra, Huseyn Shaheed Suhrawardy and Nurul Amin), Governor General of Pakistan (Sir Khawaja Nazimuddin), Chief Minister of East Bengal (Sir Khawaja Nazimuddin, Nurul Amin, A. K. Fazlul Huq and Ataur Rahman Khan), President of Bangladesh (Sheikh Mujibur Rahman, Mohammad Mohammadullah and Khondaker Mostaq Ahmad), Vice President of Bangladesh (Syed Nazrul Islam) and Prime Minister of Bangladesh (Sheikh Mujibur Rahman, Tajuddin Ahmad, Muhammad Mansur Ali and Ataur Rahman Khan).

== Background ==
Eastern Bengal and Assam was the birthplace of the Muslim League in 1906. The League was created as a response to the growth of Hindu nationalist movements in India, particularly in Bengal after the 1905 partition. It was formed at the All India Muhammadan Educational Conference, which was aimed at promoting liberal education among Indian Muslims. In 1912, the British government annulled the partition. The annulment was not well-received among many in the Muslim population.

== Formation ==
The founders of the BPML were Nawab Sir Khwaja Salimullah, Syed Nawab Ali Chowdhury, Sir Abdul Halim Ghaznavi, Justice Sir Zahid Suhrawardy, Abul Kashem, Wahid Hossain and Abdur Rasul. Many members were concurrently members of the Indian National Congress. A. K. Fazlul Huq was elected as its president in 1915.

== Language ==
The BPML adopted Bengali as its official language. All its resolutions were published in Bengali. In contrast, the central leadership of the Muslim League were mostly Urdu-speaking.

== Dyarchy ==
In the period of dyarchy (1919–1935), the BPML had many factions. One of the notable factions led by A. K. Fazlul Huq favored cooperation with the British government to achieve self-rule. Another faction led by Maniruzzaman Islamabadi supported non-cooperation and the Khilafat movement.

== Provincial autonomy ==
The BPML won 40 seats in the Bengal Legislative Assembly during the 1937 election. It supported Krishak Sramik Party leader A. K. Fazlul Huq's government. In 1940, the All India Muslim League adopted the Lahore Resolution which included references to a sovereign state in eastern India. In 1941, the BPML withdrew support for Huq's government. Its chief leader between 1937 and 1946 was Sir Khawaja Nazimuddin, a trusted confidante of All India Muslim League president Muhammad Ali Jinnah. In 1943, Nazimuddin unseated the Huq-Syama coalition, formed government and became the Prime Minister of Bengal. The conservative Nazimuddin ministry grappled with the effects of World War II, including the Bengal famine of 1943. Factional infighting increased within the BPML. The Nazimuddin ministry collapsed in 1945 and Governor's rule was imposed. The party's control passed on to a more liberal and centrist faction, which included leaders H. S. Suhrawardy and Mohammad Ali of Bogra. In the 1946 election, the BPML won a majority of 114/250 seats in the Bengal Legislative Assembly, compared to 28/60 in Sind, 75/175 in Punjab, 17/150 in the North-West Frontier Province, 54/228 in the United Provinces, 34/152 in Bihar, 31/108 in Assam, 30/175 in Bombay Presidency, 29/215 in Madras Presidency, and 4/60 in Orissa. The result in Bengal, with 45% of seats won by the BPML, was among the largest mandates for the League. The Suhrawardy ministry lasted until the partition of India in 1947. Suhrawardy mooted the proposal for a United Bengal, but the Mountbatten Plan failed to take it into account. Suhrawardy also faced bitterness to his plans from Nazimuddin and could not count on the cooperation of Nazimuddin's ally Jinnah.

== See also ==
- Krishak Sramik Party
- Legislatures of British India
- Punjab Muslim League
- Bengal Provincial Congress Party
