= Khwaja Nazimuddin =

Prime Minister of Pakistan from 1951 to 1953

His Excellency Sir Khwaja Nazimuddin KCIE NPk
- খাজা নাজিমুদ্দিন خواجہ ناظِمُ الدّین
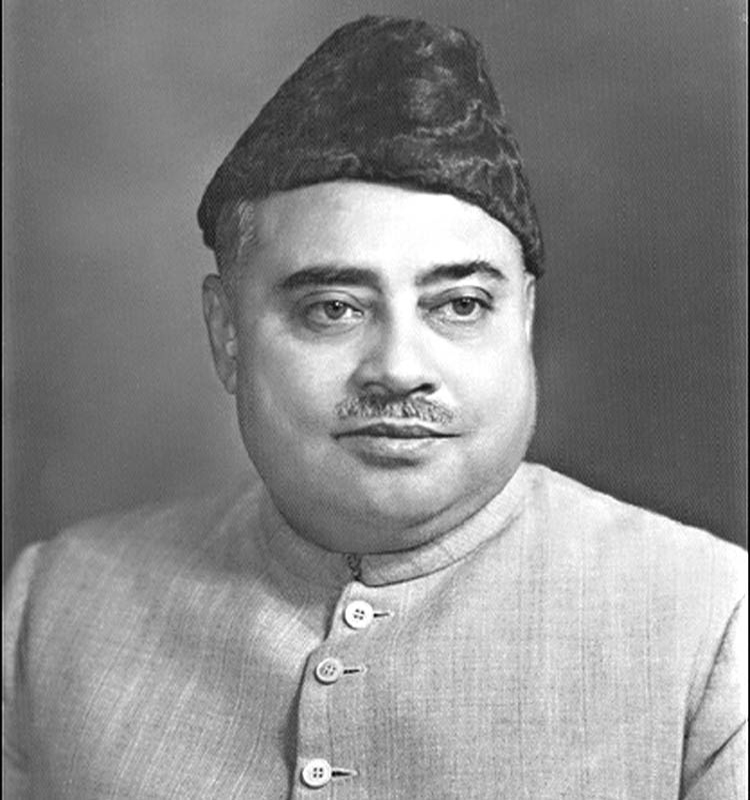
- Nazimuddin in 1948

2nd Prime Minister of Pakistan
- In office 17 October 1951 – 17 April 1953
- Monarchs: George VI; Elizabeth II
- Governor General: Malik Ghulam Muhammad
- Preceded by: Liaquat Ali Khan
- Succeeded by: Mohammad Ali Bogra

2nd Governor-General of Pakistan
- In office 14 September 1948 – 17 October 1951
- Monarch: George VI
- Prime Minister: Liaquat Ali Khan
- Preceded by: Muhammad Ali Jinnah
- Succeeded by: Malik Ghulam Muhammad

1st Chief Minister of East Bengal
- In office 15 August 1947 – 14 September 1948
- Monarch: George VI
- Governor General: Muhammad Ali Jinnah
- Prime Minister: Liaquat Ali Khan
- Governor: Fredrick Chalmers Bourne
- Preceded by: Huseyn Shaheed Suhrawardy (as Prime minister of Bengal)
- Succeeded by: Nurul Amin

2nd Prime Minister of Bengal
- In office 29 April 1943 – 31 March 1945
- Monarch: George VI
- Governors General: Victor Hope, 2nd Marquess of Linlithgow; Archibald Wavell, 1st Earl Wavell
- Governor: Richard Casey, Baron Casey
- Preceded by: A. K. Fazlul Huq
- Succeeded by: Huseyn Shaheed Suhrawardy

3rd President of Pakistan Muslim League
- In office 17 October 1951 – 17 April 1953
- Preceded by: Liaquat Ali Khan
- Succeeded by: Mohammad Ali Bogra

Personal details
- Born: 19 July 1894 Dacca, Bengal Presidency, British India
- Died: 22 October 1964 (aged 70) Dacca, East Pakistan, Pakistan
- Resting place: Mausoleum of Three Leaders, Dhaka, Bangladesh; 23.72911°N 90.39997°E
- Party: CML (1962–1964)
- Other political affiliations: PML (1947–1958); AIML (1922–1947)
- Relations: Dhaka Nawab family
- Education: MA from Cambridge University
- Occupation: Politician
- Profession: Barrister

Sir Khwaja Nazimuddin (Note: also spelled Khawaja Nazimuddin Bengali: খাজা নাজিমুদ্দীন Urdu: خواجہ ناظِمُ الدّین) KCIE (19 July 1894 – 22 October 1964) was a Pakistani politician who served as the second governor-general of Pakistan from 1948 to 1951, and then as the second prime minister of Pakistan from 1951 to 1953.

Born into an aristocratic Nawab family in Bengal, he was educated at Aligarh Muslim University before pursuing post-graduation studies at the Cambridge University. Upon returning, he embarked on his journey as a politician on the platform of the All-India Muslim League. His political career initially revolved around advocating for educational reforms in Bengal, later focusing on supporting the Pakistan Movement, a campaign for a separate Muslim homeland. Nazimuddin rose to popularity as the party's principal Bengali leader and a close associate of Muhammad Ali Jinnah. He served as Prime Minister of Bengal in British India from 1943 to 1945, and later as the 1st chief minister of East Bengal in independent Pakistan from 1947 to 1948.

Nazimuddin ascended to governor-general in 1948 after the death of Jinnah, before becoming prime minister in 1951 following the assassination of his predecessor, Liaquat Ali Khan. His term was marked by constant power struggles with his own successor as governor-general, Ghulam Muhammad, as law and order deteriorated amid the rise of the Bengali Language Movement and protests in his native Dhaka in 1952, and religious riots in Lahore a year later. The latter crisis saw the first instance of martial law, limited to the city, and led to Governor-General Ghulam Muhammad dismissing Nazimuddin on 17 April 1953.

Nazimuddin's ministry was the first federal government to be dismissed in Pakistan's history, though his former ministers, Sardar Abdur Rab Nishtar, Abdul Sattar Pirzada, and Mahmud Husain refused to take the oath of office in the new cabinet. He retired from national politics, dying after a brief illness in 1964. He is buried at the Mausoleum of Three Leaders in Dhaka. He was one of the leading founding fathers of Pakistan and the first Bengali to have governed Pakistan.

== Early life and education ==
Khwaja Nazimuddin was born into a wealthy Muslim family of the Nawabs of Dhaka on 19 July 1894, then under British Raj rule. His father was Khwaja Nizamuddin and his paternal grandfather was Khwaja Fakhruddin. His family hailed from Kashmir and was long settled in Dhaka. He was the maternal grandson of Nawab Bahadur Sir Khwaja Ahsanullah and his mother, Nawabzadi Bilqis Banu, notable for her own statue. Nazimuddin had a younger brother, Khwaja Shahabuddin, who would later play a vital role in Pakistani politics. They were the first cousin of Nawab Khwaja Habibullah, son of Nawab Sir Khwaja Salimullah Bahadur, who helped lay the foundation of the Muslim League in 1906. He grew up speaking Urdu.

He was educated at the Dunstable Grammar School in England, but returned to British India following his matriculation, where he enrolled to attend the MAO College of the Aligarh Muslim University (AMU) in Uttar Pradesh, India. Nazimuddin secured his graduation with a bachelor's degree in sociology from AMU and returned to England to pursue higher education.

After AMU, Nazimuddin went to England. He attended Trinity Hall in the University of Cambridge, and earned a Master of Arts. His training in England enabled him to practice law and become a Barrister-at-Law in England. He was knighted in 1934. In 1947–49, Nazimuddin was granted the degree of Doctor of Laws by the vice-chancellor of Dhaka University, Mahmud Hasan.

== Political career in British India ==
=== Public service and independence movement ===
Nazimuddin returned to India to join his brother Khwaja Shahbuddin from England, taking an interest in civil and public affairs that led him to join the Bengali politics. Both brothers joined the Muslim League, and Nazimuddin successfully ran for the municipality election and was elected as chairman of Dhaka Municipality from 1922 until 1929. During this time, he was appointed as education minister of Bengal. He remained minister of Education till 1934. That year he was appointed to the Viceroy's Executive Council and served until 1937. In his former capacity, he successfully piloted the Compulsory Primary Education Bill. He piloted the Bengal Agriculture Debtors' Bill and the Bengal Rural Development Bill in 1935–1936 through a hostile, landlord-dominated parliament to destroy the power of the moneylenders.

He participated in regional elections held in 1937 on a Muslim League's platform but conceded his defeat in favour of Fazlul Haq of the Krishak Praja Party (KPP) who was appointed as Prime Minister of Bengal, while assuming his personal role as member of the legislative assembly.

=== Bengal politics ===
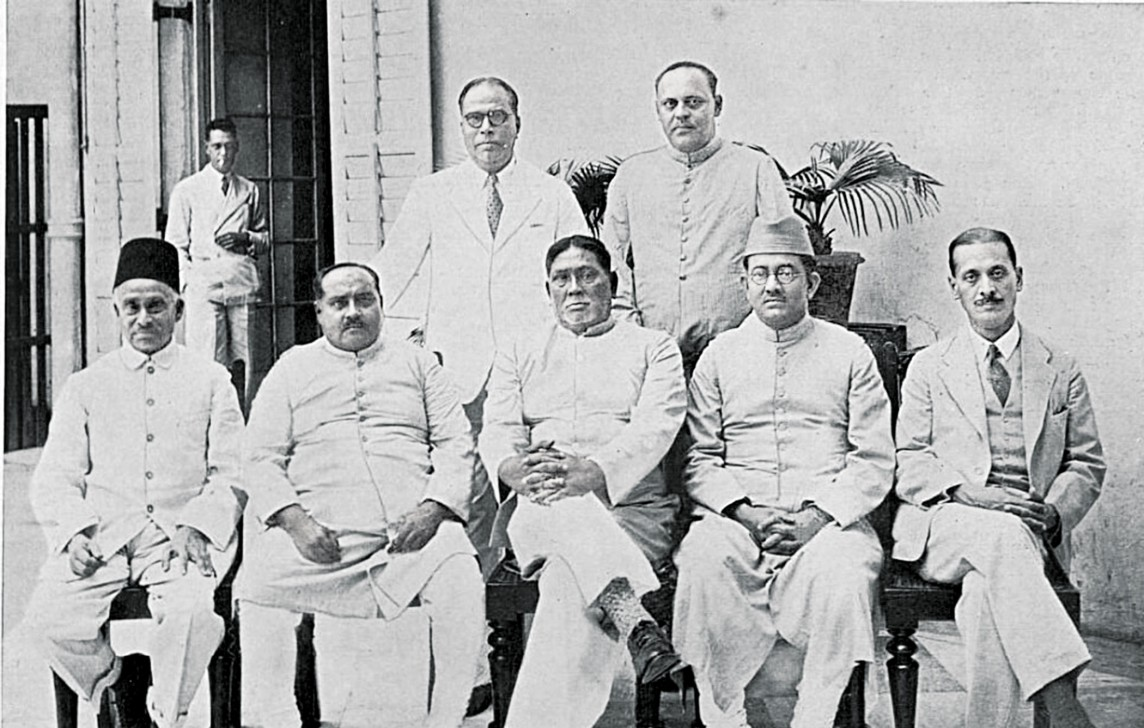
Nazimuddin (second from left) in the cabinet of A. K. Fazlul Huq, 1937

Upon the formation of the coalition government in an agreement facilitated between the Muslim League and the Krishak Praja Party, Nazimuddin was appointed as the home minister under Haq's premiership., which he continued until 1941.

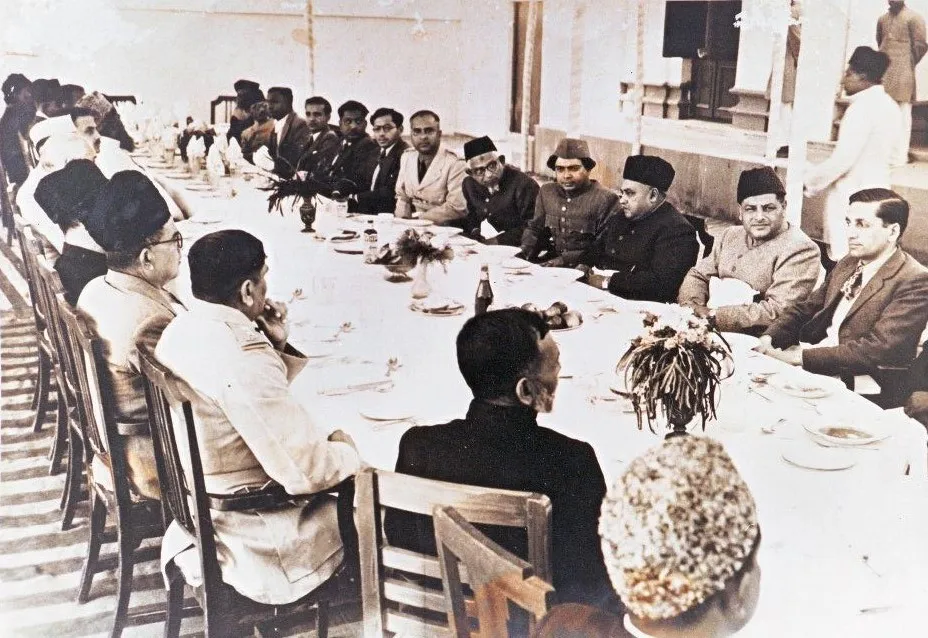
Nazimuddin during a reception at the Moyez Manzil in Faridpur, Bengal, 1946

Due to his conservative elite position, he became close associate of Muhammad Ali Jinnah, then-president of the Muslim League, who appointed him as a member of the executive committee to successfully promote the Muslim League's party agenda and program that gained popularity in East Bengal. In 1941, Nazimuddin broke away from the coalition led by Premier Fazlul Haq and decided to become a leader of the opposition, leading campaign against Haq's premiership and his coalition government formed with Hindu Mahasabha on Bengali nationalism instead of pan Muslim nationalism as promoted by Muslim League. In 1943, Nazimuddin took over the government from Premier Haq when the latter was dismissed by the governor, John Herbert, amid controversies surrounding in his political campaigns. During this time, Nazimuddin played a crucial political role for the cause for the separate Muslim homeland: Pakistan.

His premiership lasted until 1945, when his ministry's appropriation for agriculture was defeated in the assembly by 106 to 97 votes. The next day, 29 March, Speaker of the Assembly Syed Nausher Ali, an Indian nationalist Muslim and a prominent member of the Congress Party, ruled that the vote was effectively one of no confidence. On 31 March, the administration was taken over by Governor of Bengal Richard Casey under section 93 of the Government of India Act 1935.

From 1945 to 1947, Nazimuddin continued to serve as the chairman of the Muslim League in Bengal, ardently supporting the political cause for Pakistan against the Congress Party. This despite Nazimuddin and other Muslim League leaders not having thought through the consequences of the Pakistan Movement. As late as February 1947, Governor of Punjab Sir Evan Jenkins reported that Nazimuddin said "he did not know what Pakistan means and that nobody in the Muslim League knew." During this time, Nazimuddin had been in conflict with Premier Suhrawardy and strongly opposed the United Bengal Movement as in United Bengal capital would have remained in Hindu dominated Kolkata and not Dhaka in Muslim majority East Bengal. In addition, the conflict between the two men exposed deep division in the society as Suhrawardy represented the middle class, while Nazimuddin was representing the aristocracy.

== Chief Minister of East Bengal (1947–1948) ==
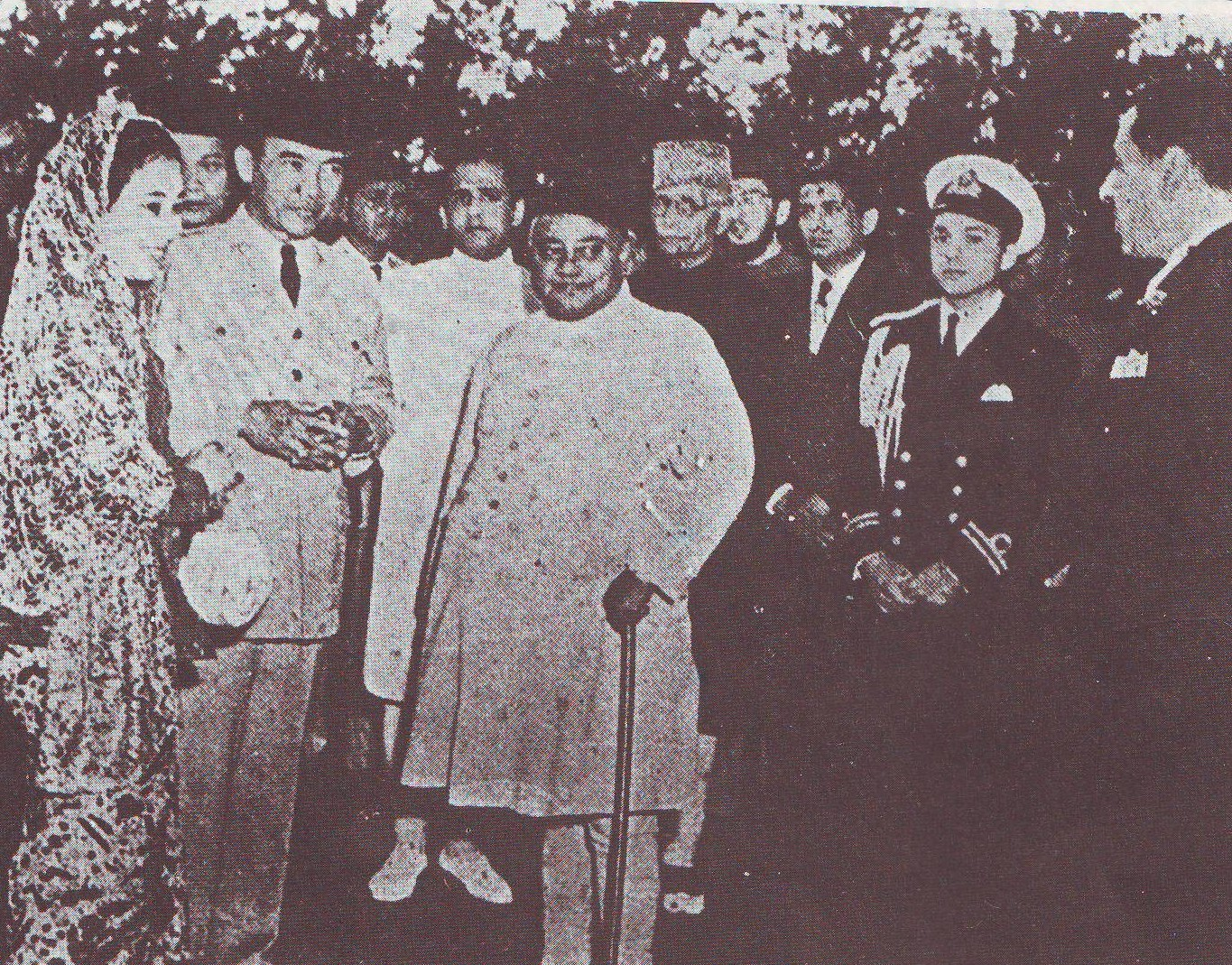
Nazimuddin meeting with Indonesian president Sukarno during the latter's visit to Pakistan, 1950

In 1947, he again contested the party elections in the Muslim League against Suhrawardy's platform and securing his nomination as the party chairman for the Muslim League's East Bengal chapter. His success in the party election eventually led him to be appointed as the first Chief Minister of East Bengal after the Partition of India in 1947 and effectively gained control of the Muslim League in the province.

As the Chief Minister, he led the motion of confidence that ultimately voted in favour of joining the Federation of Pakistan and reorganized the Government of East Bengal by delegating conservative members in his administration.

On April 6, 1948, the East Bengal Assembly passed a resolution, led by the Sir Khwaja Nazimuddin-led Muslim League government, making Bengali an official language of the province.

== Governor-General of Pakistan (1948–51) ==
On 14 August of 1947, Governor-General Muhammad Ali Jinnah relinquished the party presidency of the Pakistan Muslim League (PML) to Sir Khwaja Nazimuddin who took over the party of the president of Pakistan Muslim League (PML), due to his party electoral performance. After the death of Muhammad Ali Jinnah, Nazimuddin was appointed acting governor-general. At the urging of Prime Minister Liaquat Ali Khan, on 14 September 1948. His oath of office was supervised by Chief Justice Sir Abdul Rashid of the Federal Court of Pakistan, with Liaquat Ali Khan in attendance.

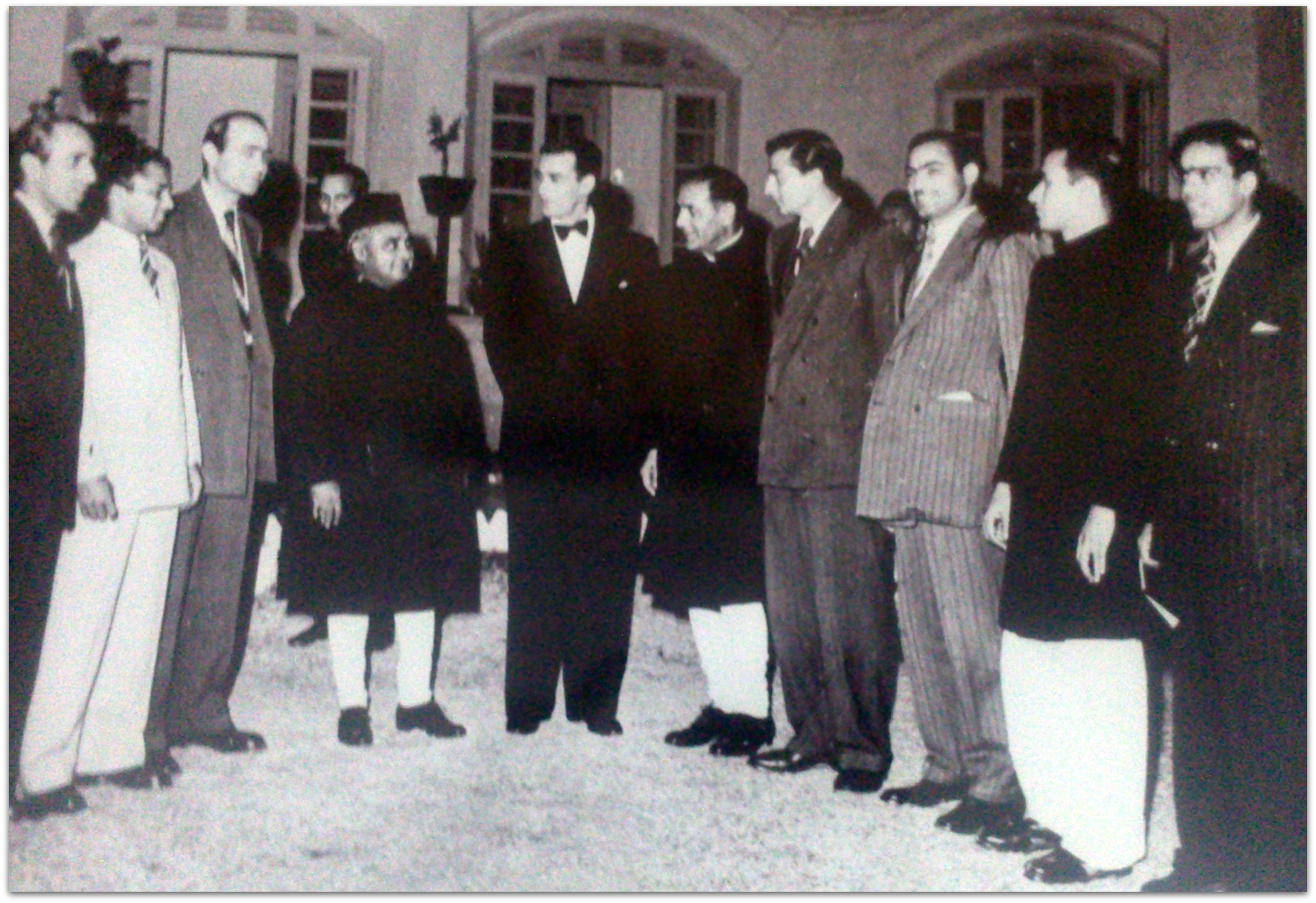
Nazimuddin with the Pakistan national cricket team prior to their 1952–53 tour of India

As governor-general, Nazimuddin set a precedent of neutrality and non-interference in government, and provided political support to Prime Minister Liaquat Ali Khan's government, which was seen as essential to the working of the responsible government at that time.

In 1949, Nazimuddin established the parliamentary committee, the Basic Principles Committee, on the advice of Prime Minister Ali Khan to underlying basic principles that would lay the foundation of the Constitution of Pakistan. It was during his tenure as Governor-General East Bengal State Acquisition and Tenancy Act of 1950 was passed in East Bengal. This law abolished the Zamindari system in the region, after which the lands of the state were under the federal government. It was seen as a democratic move to a people's state rather than a feudal class system.

== Premiership (1951–1953) ==
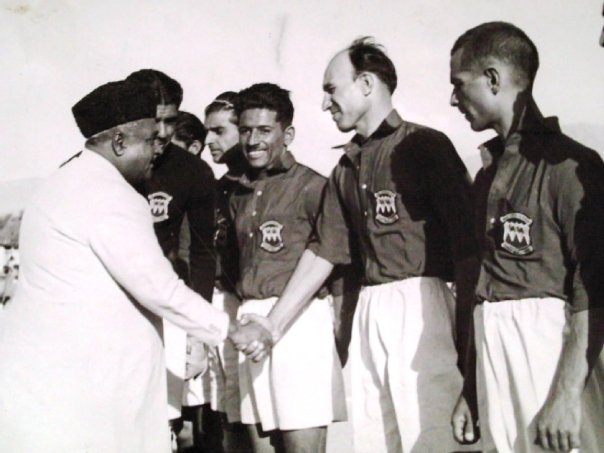
Nazimuddin with Pakistani footballer Abdul Wahid Durrani in the early 1950s

After the assassination of Liaqat Ali Khan in 1951, the Muslim League leaders asked Governor-General Nazimuddin to take over the prime ministership as well as the party's presidency, as there was no other person found suitable for the post. He appointed Finance Minister Sir Malik Ghulam to the Governor-General's post. Nazimuddin's government focused on promoting the political programs aimed at conservative ideas. During his time in office, a framework was begun for a constitution that would allow Pakistan to become a republic within the Commonwealth, and end its British Dominion status under the Crown.

Nazimuddin's administration took place during a poor economy and the rise of provincial nationalism in four provinces and East Bengal, which made him unable to run the country's affairs effectively.

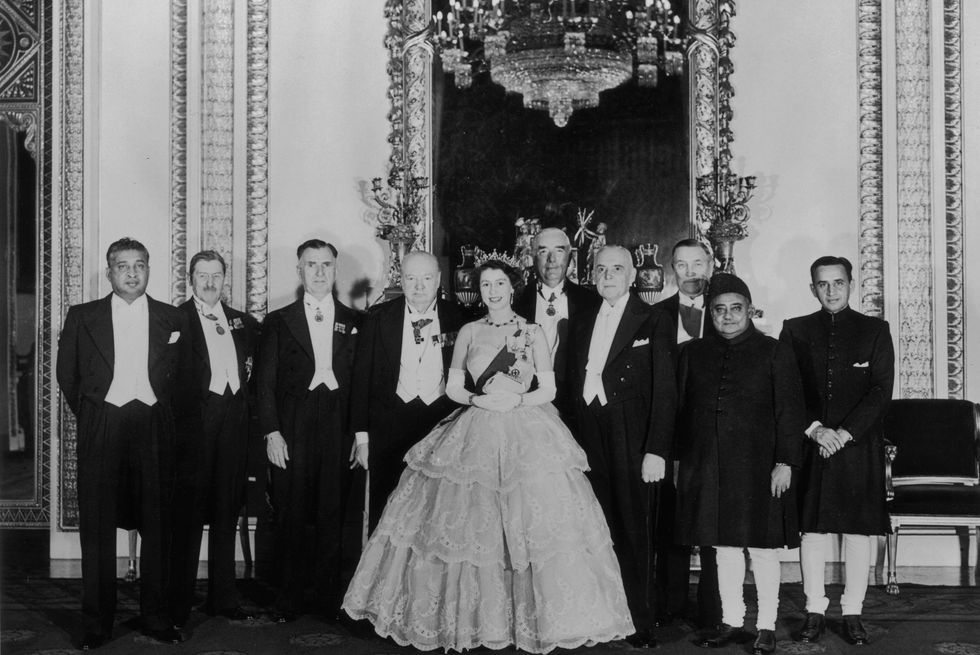
Nazimuddin with Elizabeth II of the United Kingdom and other leaders of the Commonwealth of Nations at the Commonwealth Prime Ministers' Economic Conference, December 1952

In 1951, Prime Minister Nazimuddin's government conducted the country's first nationwide census, where it was noted that 57% of the population of Karachi were refugees from India, which further complicated the situation in the country.

In January 1952, Prime Minister Nazimuddin announced publicly in Dacca that Jinnah had been right: for the sake of Pakistan's national unity, Urdu must be the official language of Pakistan–East and West. On 21 February 1952, a demonstration in the Bengali language movement demanding equal and official status to the Bengali language turned bloody, with many fatalities caused by police firings. This demonstration was held when he declared Urdu the National Language of Pakistan, following the previous statement of Muhammad Ali Jinnah that Urdu shall be the 'one and only' language of Pakistan.

In 1953, a violent religious movement led by far-right Jamaat-e-Islami began to agitate for the removal of the Ahmadi religious minority from power positions, and demanded a declaration of this minority as non-Muslims.

Nazimuddin was held morally responsible for riots being spread and resisted such pressures; but mass rioting broke out in Punjab against both the government and followers of this religious minority. To quell the unrest, Nazimuddin declared martial law in Punjab. Major General Azam Khan was made Chief Martial Law Administrator and brought Lahore under control within a couple of days. Nazimuddin forced out the Chief Minister of Punjab, Mumtaz Daultana, and replaced him with Feroz Khan Noon.

=== Dismissal ===
The agitations and violence spread through the successful Bengali language movement and the riots in Lahore proved the inability of Nazimuddin's government, as he was widely seen as weak in running the government administration.

In an attempt to improve the economy and internal security, Malik Ghulam asked Prime Minister Nazimuddin to step down in the wider interest of the country. Nazimuddin refused to oblige, and Malik Ghulam used reserve powers granted in the Government of India Act 1935, dismissed Nazimuddin in what was seen as a constitutional coup.

Nazimuddin then requested the Federal Court of Pakistan's intervention against this action, but the Chief Justice, Muhammad Munir did not rule on the legality of the dismissal, but instead forced new elections to be held in 1954. Malik Ghulam appointed another Bengali politician, Muhammad Ali Bogra who was then serving as the Pakistan Ambassador to the United States, as the new prime minister until the new elections to be held in 1954.

== Death and legacy ==
=== Later life and death ===
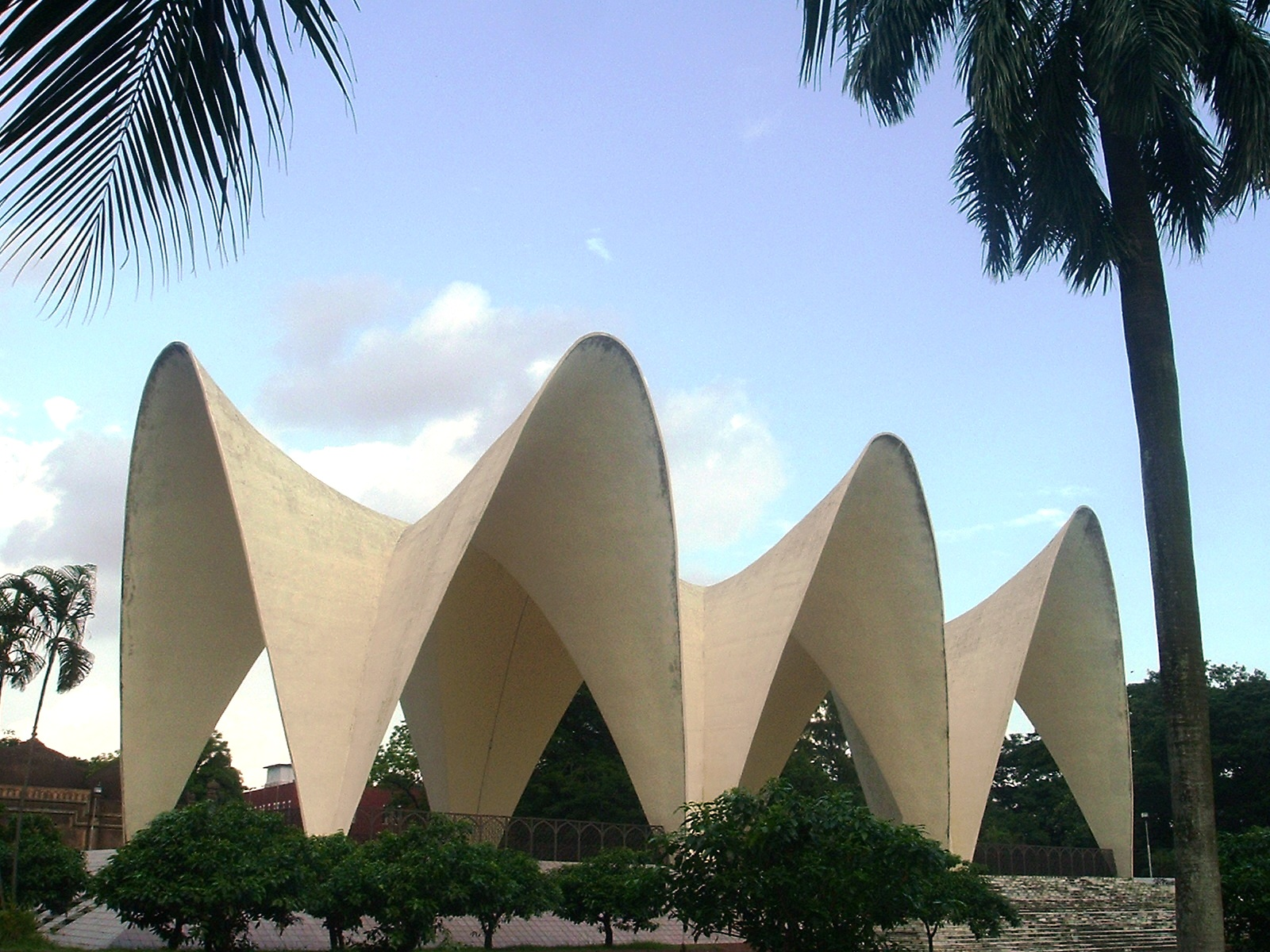
Mausoleum of three leaders at Dhaka

After his dismissal, he and his family remained active in parliamentary politics; his nephew, Khwaja Wasiuddin, was an army general serving as GOC-in-C II Corps and later repatriated to Bangladesh in 1974.

His younger brother, Shahabuddin, remained active in politics and became Information minister in President Ayub Khan's administration.

Sir Khwaja died in 1964, aged 70. He was buried in the Mausoleum of three leaders in his hometown of Dhaka.

=== Wealth and honours ===
Nazimuddin and his brother, Shahabuddin, belonged to an aristocratic family who were known for their wealth. In a thesis written by Joya Chatterji, Nazimuddin was described for unquestionable loyalty to the British administration in India:

Short statured with a bulging pear-like figure, he was known for his insatiable appetite and his unfailing submission to the ... Britishers ... Dressed in British-styled Sherwani and breechers-like Churidar pajamas with a Fez cap and wearing little shoes, he carried a... cane of knob and represented an age and tradition.

— Joya Chatterji, Bengal Divided: Hindu Communalism and Partition

By 1934, the family had estates that covered almost 200,000 acres and was well spread over different districts of Eastern Bengal, together with properties in Shillong, Assam and Kolkata, had a yearly rent of £120,000 ($2,736,497.94 in 2017). By the 1960s, the majority of estate was relocated from East Pakistan to the different areas of Pakistan, leaving very little of his estate in East.

He was appointed a Companion of the Order of the Indian Empire (CIE) in 1926, and was knighted in the 1934 King's Birthday Honours by the King-Emperor, George V, when he was appointed a Knight Commander of the Order of the Indian Empire (KCIE).

In 1958, he was awarded the highest civilian award titled Nishan-e-Pakistan. Later by the Government of Pakistan, Nazimuddin has been honoured from time to time after his death. In Karachi, the residential areas, Nazimabad and North Nazimabad in suburbs of Karachi, had been named after him. In Islamabad, there is a road intersection, Nazimuddin Road, named for him.

== Commemorative postage stamp ==
In his honour, the Pakistan Post issued a commemorative stamp in its 'Pioneers of Freedom' series in 1990.

== See also ==
- List of prime ministers of Pakistan
- Politics of Pakistan
- Nawab of Dhaka

== Bibliography ==
- Nair, M Bhaskaran (1990). Politics in Bangladesh: A Study of Awami League, 1949-58 (PDF). India: Northern Book Centre (New Delhi). ISBN 81-85119-79-1.

== Notes ==
Political offices
Preceded by A.K. Fazlul Haque	Prime Minister of Bengal; 1943–1945	Succeeded by Huseyn Shaheed Suhrawardy
Preceded by Huseyn Shaheed Suhrawardy	Chief Minister of East Bengal; 1947–1948	Succeeded by Nurul Amin
Preceded by Muhammad Ali Jinnah	Governor-General of Pakistan; 1948–1951	Succeeded by Sir Malik Ghulam Muhammad
Preceded by Liaquat Ali Khan	Prime Minister of Pakistan; 1951–1953	Succeeded by Muhammad Ali Bogra
Preceded by Liaquat Ali Khan	Minister of Defence; 1951–1953	Succeeded by Muhammad Ali Bogra
