= 1937 Bengal Legislative Assembly election =

Election in British India

- 1937

All 251 seats in the Bengal Legislative Assembly 125 seats needed for a majority
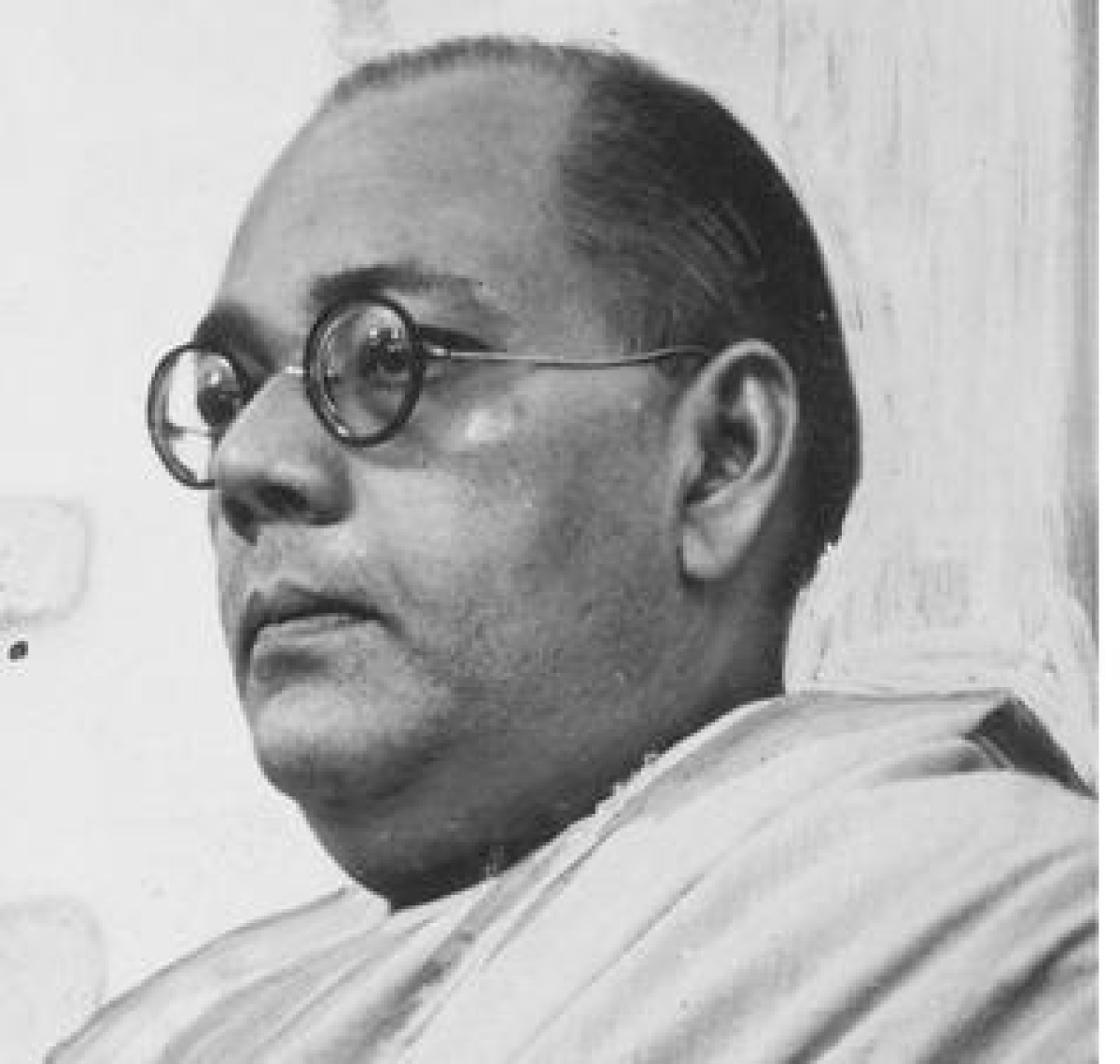

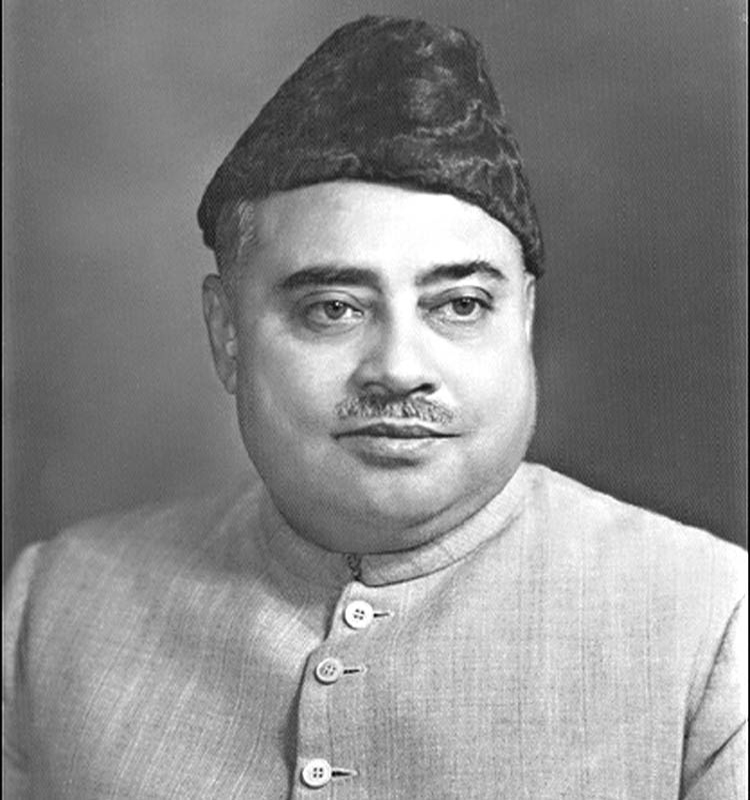

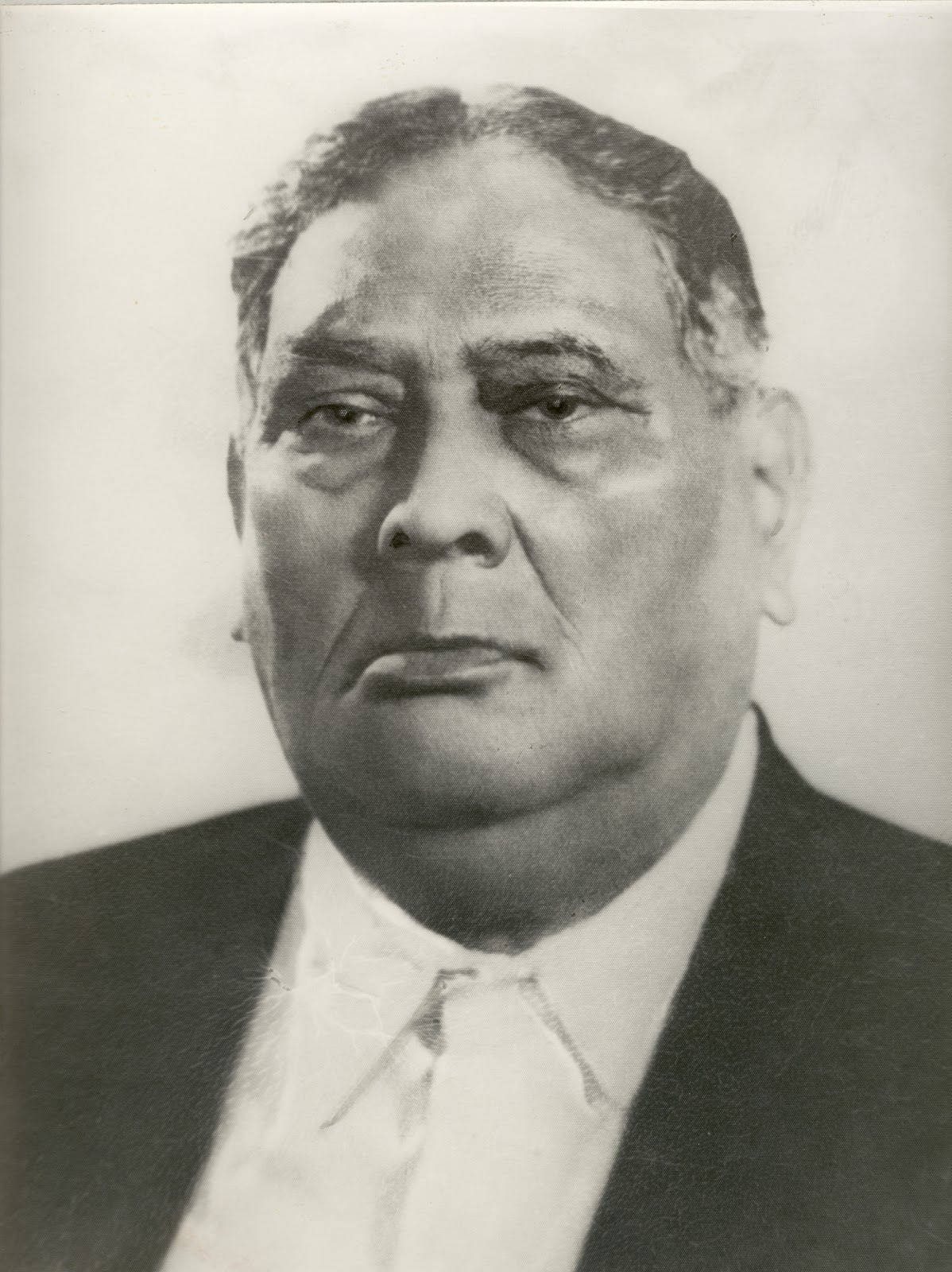
	First party	Second party
Leader	Sarat Chandra Bose	Khwaja Nazimuddin
Party	INC	AIML
Leader since	1936	1913
Leader's seat	Calcutta South (General)	Calcutta North (Mohammedan)
Seats won	54	43
	Third party	Fourth party
		ABH
Leader	A. K. Fazlul Huq	Sanat Kumar Roy Chowdhury
Party	KPP	ABHM
Leader since	1936	1931
Leader's seat	Patuakhali North (Mohammedan)	Did not contest
Seats won	37	4
Elected Prime Minister
A. K. Fazlul Huq
KPP

The 1937 Bengal Legislative Assembly election was held in January 1937 as part of the broader 1937 Indian provincial elections introduced under the Government of India Act 1935. It marked the establishment of the Bengal Legislative Assembly with expanded powers and provincial autonomy. The election resulted in a hung assembly, with the Krishak Praja Party, led by A. K. Fazlul Huq, forming a coalition government.

== Background ==
The Government of India Act 1935 introduced significant constitutional reforms, aiming to grant greater self-governance to Indians under British colonial rule. Among its most notable provisions was the establishment of provincial autonomy, replacing the dyarchy introduced by the 1919 Act. Under the 1935 Act, Indian ministers were given full control over provincial portfolios, except for defense, external affairs, and certain matters related to the governor's discretionary powers.

In the province of Bengal, the Act established a bicameral legislature, comprising the Legislative Assembly (lower house) and the Legislative Council (upper house). The Legislative Assembly consisted of 250 members, elected through a system of separate electorates that reflected the communal and socio-economic divisions in colonial Bengal. The electorate was limited and based largely on property, income, and education qualifications, which disproportionately favored landowners, urban elites, and business interests.

The 250 seats in the Bengal Legislative Assembly were categorized into various communal and functional constituencies. These included seats reserved for Muslims, Hindus, Scheduled Castes (Depressed Classes), Europeans, Indian Christians, Anglo-Indians, landlords, commerce and industry, and universities. Of these, 117 seats were reserved for Muslims, 78 for Hindus, and 30 for Scheduled Castes, while the remaining were distributed among other interest-based categories.

The Act allowed Indian ministers to form cabinets and manage internal provincial affairs, provided they commanded the confidence of the majority in the Assembly. However, the governor retained overriding authority in certain matters, including the power to dismiss ministries and veto legislation. This tension between Indian autonomy and colonial control remained a key political issue throughout the tenure of the provincial governments formed under the 1935 Act.

== Seats ==
The allocation of 251 seats in the assembly was based on the communal award. It is illustrated in the following.

- General elected seats- 78
- Muslim electorate seats- 118
  - Urban seats- 6
  - Rural seats- 112
- Anglo-Indian electorate seats- 3
- European electorate seats- 11
- Indian Christian electorate seats- 2
- Zamindar seats- 5
- Labour representatives- 8
- Education seats- 2
  - University of Calcutta- 1
  - University of Dacca- 1
- Women seats- 5
  - General electorate- 2
  - Muslim electorate- 2
  - Anglo-Indian electorate- 1
- Commerce, Industries and Planting seats- 19
  - Port of Calcutta
  - Port of Chittagong
  - Bengal Chamber of Commerce
  - Jute Interest
  - Tea Interest
  - Railways
  - Traders Associations
  - Others

== Results ==
The Indian National Congress emerged as the largest party overall with 54 seats, but it fell far short of a majority. The Krishak Praja Party (KPP) and Muslim League, both primarily Muslim-based parties, gained significant influence in the Muslim-majority constituencies. The Muslim League notably gained strength in urban Muslim areas, while the KPP, representing rural Muslim peasants, had success in rural constituencies. Despite the League winning fewer total seats than Congress, it secured a stronger presence in the reserved Muslim seats due to communal electorate divisions.

Party	Hindu urban	Hindu rural	Hindu women	Muslim urban	Muslim rural	Muslim women	Indian Christian	Anglo-Indian	Anglo-Indian women	European	Landholders	Commerce	Labour	Universities	Total
Indian National Congress	11	37 (inclusive of 7 seats reserved for Dalits)	2	-	-	-	-	-	-	-	-	-	4	-	54
All India Muslim League	-	-	-	6	30	2	-	-	-	-	-	1	-	1	40
Krishak Praja Party	-	-	-	-	36	-	-	-	-	-	-	-	-	-	36
Tripura Krishak Samiti	-	-	-	-	5	-	-	-	-	-	-	-	-	-	5
Akhil Bharatiya Hindu Mahasabha	1	2 (both reserved for Dalits)	-	-	-	-	-	-	-	-	1	-	-	-	4
Congress Nationalist Party	-	1	-	-	-	-	-	-	-	-	-	-	-	-	1
Independent Hindus	-	26 (inclusive of 21 seats reserved for Dalits)	-	-	-	-	-	-	-	-	4	4	2	1	37
Independent Muslims	-	-	-	-	40	-	-	-	-	-	-	-	2	-	42
Unaligned	-	-	-	-	-	-	2	3	1	11	-	14	-	-	31
Total	12	66 (inclusive of 30 seats reserved for Dalits)	2	6	111	2	2	3	1	11	5	19	8	2	250

=== Constituency wise leads ===
Constituency	Constituency Type	Elected Candidate
Calcutta North	General	Babu Jatindra Nath Basu
Calcutta East	General	Santosh Kumar Basu
Calcutta West	General	Probhudoyal Himatsingka
Calcutta Central	General	Dr. J. M. Das Gupta
Calcutta South Central	General	Jogesh Chandra Gupta
Calcutta South	General	Sarat Chandra Bose
Hooghly-cum-Howrah Municipal	General	Barada Prosanna Pain
Burdwan Division North Municipal	General	Tulsi Chandra Goswami
24-Parganas Municipal	General	Rai Harendra Nath Chaudhuri
Presidency Division Municipal	General	Dr. Nalinaksha Sanyal
North Bengal Municipal	General	Surendra Mohan Maitra
East Bengal Municipal	General	Birendra Nath Mazumdar
Burdwan Central	General	Maharajkumar Uday Chand Mahtab
Burdwan North-West	General	Pramatha Nath Banerjee
Birbhum	General	Dr. Sharat Chandra Mukherjee
Bankura West	General	Srijut Manindra Bhusan Sinha
Bankura East	General	Kamalkrishna Ray
Midnapore Central	General	Debendra Lall Khan
Jhargram-cum-Ghatal	General	Kishori Pati Roy
Midnapore East	General	Dr. Gobinda Chandra Bhawmik
Midnapore South-West	General	Iswar Chandra Mal
Midnapore South-East	General	Nikunja Behari Maiti
Hooghly North-East	General	Dhirendra Narayan Mukharji
Hooghly South-West	General	Sukumar Dutta
Howrah	General	Manmatha Nath Roy
24-Parganas South-East	General	Rai Jogesh Chandra Sen Bahadur
24-Parganas North-West	General	P. Banerjee
Nadia	General	Haripada Chattopadhyay
Murshidabad	General	Sasanka Sekhar Sanyal
Jessore	General	Babu Atul Krishna Ghose
Khulna	General	Babu Nagendra Nath Sen
Rajshahi	General	Satya Priya Banerjee
Malda	General	Atul Chandra Kumar
Dinajpur	General	Nishitha Nath Kundu
Jalpaiguri-cum-Siliguri	General	Babu Khagendra Nath Das Gupta
Rangpur	General	Jotindra Nath Chakrabarty
Bogra-cum-Pabna	General	Babu Narendra Narayan Chakrabarty
Dacca East	General	Babu Manoranjan Bannerjee
Dacca West	General	Kiran Sankar Roy
Mymensingh West	General	Charu Chandra Roy
Mymensingh East	General	Birendra Kishore Ray Choudhury
Faridpur	General	Babu Surendra Nath Biswas
Bakarganj South-West	General	Narendra Nath Das Gupta
Bakarganj North-East	General	Jogendra Nath Mandal
Tippera	General	Dhirendra Nath Datta
Noakhali	General	Harendra Kumar Sur
Chittagong	General	Mahim Chandra Das
Darjeeling	General	Damber Singh Gurung
Burdwan Central	General (reserved for Scheduled Castes)	Adwaita Kumar Maji
Burdwan North-West	General (reserved for Scheduled Castes)	Banku Behari Mandal
Birbhum	General (reserved for Scheduled Castes)	Babu Debendra Nath Das
Bankura West	General (reserved for Scheduled Castes)	Srijut Ashutosh Mullick
Midnapore Central	General (reserved for Scheduled Castes)	Krishna Prasad Mandal
Jhargram-cum-Ghatal	General (reserved for Scheduled Castes)	Harendra Dolui
Hooghly North-East	General (reserved for Scheduled Castes)	Babu Radhanath Das
Howrah	General (reserved for Scheduled Castes)	Pulin Behary Mullick
24-Parganas South-East	General (reserved for Scheduled Castes)	Hem Chandra Naskar
24-Parganas North-West	General (reserved for Scheduled Castes)	Anukul Chandra Das
Nadia	General (reserved for Scheduled Castes)	Babu Lakshmi Narayan Biswas
Murshidabad	General (reserved for Scheduled Castes)	Kirit Bhusan Das
Jessore	General (reserved for Scheduled Castes)	Rasik Lal Biswas
Khulna	General (reserved for Scheduled Castes)	Babu Patiram Ray
Khulna	General (reserved for Scheduled Castes)	Mukunda Behary Mullick
Malda	General (reserved for Scheduled Castes)	Tarinicharan Pramanik
Dinajpur	General (reserved for Scheduled Castes)	Babu Premhari Barma
Dinajpur	General (reserved for Scheduled Castes)	Babu Shyama Prosad Barman
Jalpaiguri-cum-Siliguri	General (reserved for Scheduled Castes)	Babu Upendranath Barman
Jalpaiguri-cum-Siliguri	General (reserved for Scheduled Castes)	Prasanna Deb Raikut
Rangpur	General (reserved for Scheduled Castes)	Puspajit Barma
Rangpur	General (reserved for Scheduled Castes)	Babu Kshetra Nath Singha
Bogra-cum-Pabna	General (reserved for Scheduled Castes)	Babu Madhusudan Sarkar
Dacca East	General (reserved for Scheduled Castes)	Dhananjoy Roy
Mymensingh West	General (reserved for Scheduled Castes)	Amrita Lal Mandal
Mymensingh East	General (reserved for Scheduled Castes)	Monomohan Das
Faridpur	General (reserved for Scheduled Castes)	Birat Chandra Mandal
Faridpur	General (reserved for Scheduled Castes)	Promatha Ranjan Thakur
Bakarganj South-West	General (reserved for Scheduled Castes)	Upendranath Edbar
Tippera	General (reserved for Scheduled Castes)	Jagat Chandra Mandal
Calcutta North	Muhammadan	Khwaja Sir Nazimuddin
Calcutta South	Muhammadan	M. A. H. Ispahani
Hooghly-cum-Howrah Municipal	Muhammadan	K. Nooruddin
Barrackpore Municipal	Muhammadan	Maulvi Md. Solaiman
Burdwan	Muhammadan	Maulvi Abul Hashim
Birbhum	Muhammadan	Maulvi Md. Abdur Rasheed
Bankura	Muhammadan	Dr. Syed Muhammad Siddique
Midnapore	Muhammadan	Khan Bahadur Alfazuddin Ahmed
Hooghly	Muhammadan	Maulvi Abul Quasem
Howrah	Muhammadan	Khan Sahib Maulvi S. Abdur Rauf
24-Parganas Municipal	Muhammadan	H. S. Suhrawardy
24-Parganas South	Muhammadan	Jasimuddin Ahmed
24-Parganas Central	Muhammadan	Quara Yousuf Mirza
24-Parganas North-East	Muhammadan	Khan Bahadur A. F. M. Abdur Rahman
Kushtia	Muhammadan	M. Shamsuddin Ahmed
Meherpur	Muhammadan	Mohammad Mohsin Ali
Nadia East	Muhammadan	Maulvi Aftab Hossain Joarder
Nadia West	Muhammadan	Khan Bahadur M. Azizul Huq
Berhampore	Muhammadan	Maulvi Abdul Bari
Murshidabad South-West	Muhammadan	Sahibzada Kawan Jah Syed Kazem Ali Meerza
Jangipur	Muhammadan	M. Farhad Raza Chowdhury
Jessore Sadar	Muhammadan	Syed Nausher Ali
Jessore East	Muhammadan	Maulvi Waliur Rahman
Bongaon	Muhammadan	Maulvi Serajul Islam
Jhenidah	Muhammadan	Khan Sahib Maulana Ahmed Ali Enayetpuri
Khulna	Muhammadan	Abdul Hakeem
Satkhira	Muhammadan	Syed Jalaluddin Hashemy
Bagerhat	Muhammadan	Syed Mustagawad Haque
Rajshahi North	Muhammadan	Maulvi Maniruddin Akhand
Rajshahi South	Muhammadan	Maulvi Mohammad Amir Ali Mia
Rajshahi Central	Muhammadan	Maulvi Moslem Ali Mollah
Nator	Muhammadan	M. Ashrafali
Balurghat	Muhammadan	Maulvi Mafizuddin Choudhury
Thakurgaon	Muhammadan	Maulvi Hafizuddin Choudhury
Dinajpur Central East	Muhammadan	Maulvi Abdul Jabbar
Dinajpur Central West	Muhammadan	Khan Bahadur Mahtabuddin Ahmed
Nilphamari	Muhammadan	Khan Bahadur A. M. I.. Rahman
Rangpur North	Muhammadan	Haji Safiruddin Ahmed
Rangpur South	Muhammadan	Shah Abdur Rauf
Kurigaon North	Muhammadan	Kazi Emdadul Haque
Kurigaon South	Muhammadan	Abdul Hafiz
Gaibandha North	Muhammadan	Maulvi Abu Hossain Sarkar
Gaibandha South	Muhammadan	Ahmed Hossain
Bogra East	Muhammadan	Maulvi Rajibuddin Tarafdar
Bogra South	Muhammadan	Maulvi Mohammad Ishaque
Bogra North	Muhammadan	Dr. Mafizuddin Ahmed
Bogra West	Muhammadan	Khan Bahadur Mohammad Ali
Pabna East	Muhammadan	Maulvi Azhar Ali
Pabna West	Muhammadan	A. M. Abdul Hamid
Serajganj South	Muhammadan	Abdur Raschid Mahmood
Serajganj North	Muhammadan	Md. Abdulla-Al-Mahmood
Serajganj Central	Muhammadan	Mohammad Barat Ali
Malda North	Muhammadan	Zahur Ahmed Chowdhury
Malda South	Muhammadan	Maulvi Idris Ahmed Mia
Narayanganj South	Muhammadan	Khwaja Shahabuddin
Narayanganj East	Muhammadan	Maulviana Muhammad Abdul Aziz
Jalpaiguri-cum-Darjeeling	Muhammadan	Nawab Musharruff Hossain, Khan Bahadur
Narayanganj North	Muhammadan	S. A. Salim
Munshiganj	Muhammadan	Maulvi Mohammad Abdul Hakim Vikrampuri
Dacca South Central	Muhammadan	Razaur Rahman Khan
Manikganj East	Muhammadan	Maulvi Aulad Hossain Khan
Manikganj West	Muhammadan	Maulvi Abdul Latif Biswas
Dacca North Central	Muhammadan	Maulvi Mohammad Abdus Shaheed
Dacca Central	Muhammadan	Khan Bahadur Syed Abdul Hafeez
Dacca Municipal	Muhammadan	Nawab K. Habibullah Bahadur, of Dacca
Jamalpur East	Muhammadan	Fazlur Rahman
Jamalpur North	Muhammadan	Mahammad Abdul Jabbar Palwan
Jamalpur West	Muhammadan	Giasuddin Ahmed
Jamalpur-cum-Muktagacha	Muhammadan	Abdul Karim
Mymensingh North	Muhammadan	Maulvi Abdul Majid
Mymensingh East	Muhammadan	Maulvi Abdul Wahed
Mymensingh South	Muhammadan	Maulana Shamaul Huda
Mymensingh West	Muhammadan	Maulvi Abdul Hakim
Tangail South	Muhammadan	Maulvi Masud Ali Khan Panni
Tangail West	Muhammadan	Maulvi Mirza Abdul Hafiz
Tangail North	Muhammadan	Syed Hasan Ali Chowdhury
Netrakona South	Muhammadan	Khan Sahib Maulvi Kabiruddin Khan
Netrakona North	Muhammadan	Abul Hossain Ahmed
Kishoreganj South	Muhammadan	Maulvi Mohammad Israil
Kishoreganj North	Muhammadan	Maulvi Abdul Hamid Shah
Kishoreganj East	Muhammadan	Khan Sahib Hamiduddin Ahmed
Gopalganj	Muhammadan	Shamsuddin Ahmed Khandakar
Goalundo	Muhammadan	Maulvi Ahmed Ali Mridha
Faridpur West	Muhammadan	Maulvi Tamizuddin Khan
Faridpur East	Muhammadan	Yusuf Ali Chowdhury
Madaripur West	Muhammadan	Mahammad Abul Fazl
Madaripur East	Muhammadan	Gyasuddin Ahmed Chowdhury
Patuakhali North	Muhammadan	A. K. Fazlul Huq
Patuakhali South	Muhammadan	Abdul Kader alias Lal Meah
Pirojpur South	Muhammadan	Khan Sahib Hatemally Jamadar
Pirojpur North	Muhammadan	Khan Sahib Maulvi Syed Muhammad Afzal
Bakarganj North	Muhammadan	Khan Bahadur Maulvi Hashem Ali Khan
Bakarganj South	Muhammadan	Sadaruddin Ahmed
Bakarganj West	Muhammadan	Maulvi Abdul Wahab Khan
Bhola North	Muhammadan	Maulvi Mohammad Mazammol Huq
Bhola South	Muhammadan	Haji Maulvi Tofel Ahmed Chowdhury
Brahmanbaria North	Muhammadan	Maulvi Dewan Mustufa Ali
Brahmanbaria South	Muhammadan	Nawabzada K. Nasarullah
Tippera North-East	Muhammadan	Maqbul Hossain
Tippera North	Muhammadan	Nawab Sir Mohiuddin Faroqui, Kt., of Ratanpur
Tippera West	Muhammadan	Ramizuddin Ahmed
Tippera Central	Muhammadan	Asimuddin Ahmed
Tippera South	Muhammadan	Maulvi Mahammad Hasanuzzaman
Chandpur East	Muhammadan	Maulvi Jonab Ali Majumdar
Chandpur West	Muhammadan	Khan Bahadur Abidur Reza Chowdhury
Matlabbazar	Muhammadan	Shahedali
Noakhali North	Muhammadan	Maulvi Mohammad Ibrahim
Noakhali Central	Muhammadan	Maulvi Aminullah
Ramganj-cum-Raipur	Muhammadan	Shah Syed Golam Sarwar Hosaini
Noakhali West	Muhammadan	Syed Ahmed Khan
Noakhali South	Muhammadan	Syed Abdul Majid
Feni	Muhammadan	Maulvi Abdur Razzak
Cox's Bazar	Muhammadan	Khan Bahadur Maulvi Jalaluddin Ahmad
Chittagong South	Muhammadan	Maulvi Ahmed Kabir Chowdhury
Chittagong South Central	Muhammadan	Maulana Mahammad Maniruzzaman Islamabadi
Chittagong North-East	Muhammadan	Al-Haj Maulana Dr. Sanaullah
Chittagong North-West	Muhammadan	Khan Bahadur Maulvi Fazluk Qudjir
Calcutta	Women General	Miss Mira Dutta Gupta
Dacca	Women General	Hemaprova Majumdar
Calcutta	Women Muhammadan	Hasina Murshed
Dacca	Women Muhammadan	Begum Farhat Bano Khanam
Anglo-Indian	Anglo-Indian	J. W. Chippendale
Anglo-Indian	Anglo-Indian	L. T. Maguire
Anglo-Indian	Anglo-Indian	C. Griffiths
Anglo-Indian	Anglo-Indian	Ellen West
Burdwan Division	European	W. L. Armstrong
Hooghly-cum-Howrah	European	J. R. Walker
Calcutta and Suburbs	European	C. S. MacLauchlan
Calcutta and Suburbs	European	F. C. Brasher
Calcutta and Suburbs	European	C. Millar
Calcutta and Suburbs	European	–
Presidency Division	European	G. Morgan, C.I.E.
Rajshahi Division	European	R. H. Ferguson
Darjeeling	European	W. C. Patton
Dacca Division	European	–
Chittagong Division	European	L. M. Crosfield
Calcutta-cum-Presidency Division	Indian Christian	Dr. H. C. Mukherji
Dacca Division	Indian Christian	S. A. Gomes
Bengal Chamber of Commerce	Commerce and Industry	–
Bengal Chamber of Commerce	Commerce and Industry	David Hendry
Bengal Chamber of Commerce	Commerce and Industry	M. A. F. Hirtsel
Bengal Chamber of Commerce	Commerce and Industry	I. A. Clark
Bengal Chamber of Commerce	Commerce and Industry	R. M. Sassoon
Bengal Chamber of Commerce	Commerce and Industry	–
Bengal Chamber of Commerce	Commerce and Industry	W. C. Wordsworth
Calcutta Trades Association	Commerce and Industry	K. A. Hamilton
Calcutta Trades Association	Commerce and Industry	–
Indian Jute Mills Association	Commerce and Industry	C. G. Cooper
Indian Jute Mills Association	Commerce and Industry	T. B. Nimmo
Indian Tea Association	Commerce and Industry	H. C. Bannerman
Indian Tea Association	Commerce and Industry	C. W. Miles
Indian Mining Association	Commerce and Industry	J. B. Ross
Bengal National Chamber of Commerce	Commerce and Industry	Nalini Ranjan Sarker
Bengal National Chamber of Commerce	Commerce and Industry	Sir Hari Sankar Paul, Kt.
Indian Chamber of Commerce	Commerce and Industry	Debi Prasad Khaitan
Marwari Association	Commerce and Industry	Rai Moongtu Lall Tapuriah Bahadur
Muslim Chamber of Commerce	Commerce and Industry	Abdur Rahman Siddiqi
Burdwan Landholders	Landholders	Sir Bijoy Prasad Singh Roy, Kt.
Rajshahi Landholders	Landholders	Kumar Shib Shokhareswar Ray
Presidency Landholders	Landholders	Maharaja Srischandra Nandy, of Kasimbazar
Dacca Landholders	Landholders	Maharaja Sashi Kanta Acharjya Choudhury, of Muktagachha
Chittagong Landholders	Landholders	Rai Kshirod Chandra Roy Bahadur
Railway Trade Union	Labour – (i) Trade Union Labour	J. N. Gupta
Water Transport Trade Union	Labour – (i) Trade Union Labour	Aftab Ali
Calcutta and Suburbs (Registered factories)	Labour – (ii) Factory and Colliery Labour	Dr. Suresh Chandra Banerjee
Barrackpore (Registered factories)	Labour – (ii) Factory and Colliery Labour	Niharendu Dutta Mazumdar
Howrah (Registered factories)	Labour – (ii) Factory and Colliery Labour	Sibnath Banerjee
Hooghly-cum-Serampore (Registered factories)	Labour – (ii) Factory and Colliery Labour	A. M. A. Zaman
Colliery (Coal Mines)	Labour – (ii) Factory and Colliery Labour	B. Mukherjee
Bengal Dooars (Western)	Labour – (iii) Tea Garden Labour	Babu Litta Munda Sirdar
Calcutta University	University	Syamaprasad Mookerjee
Dacca University	University	Fazlur Rahman

== Aftermath ==
=== Government formation ===
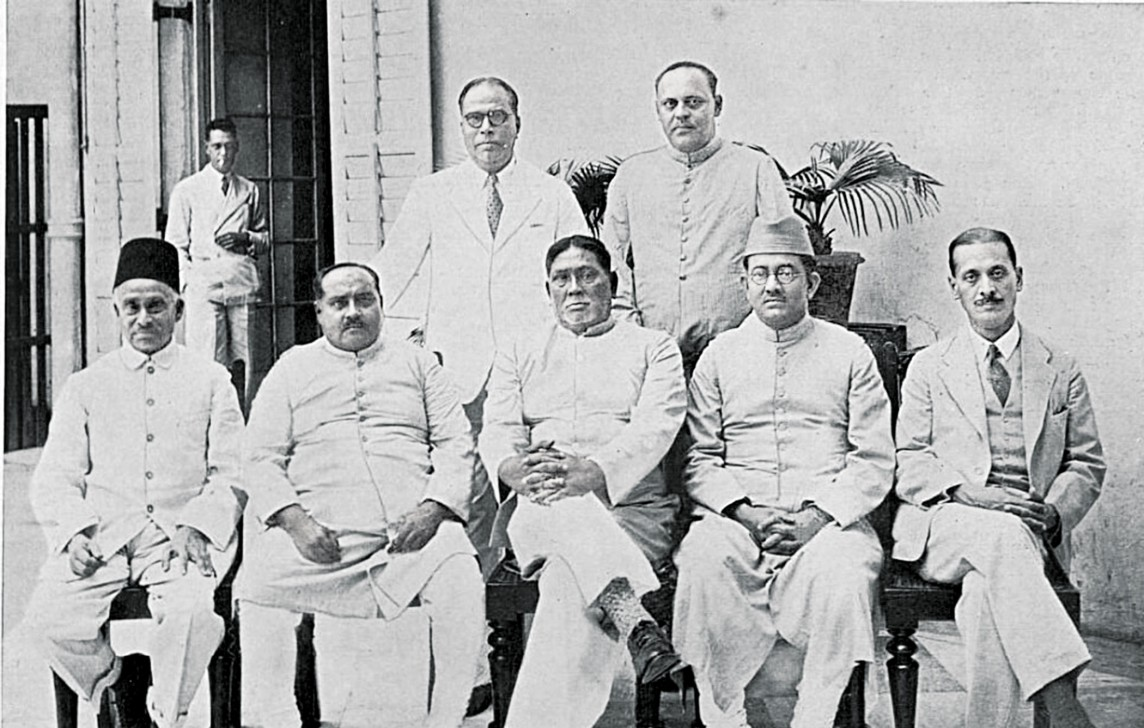
Fazlul Huq's first cabinet in 1937

Following the 1937 elections, no single party secured an outright majority in the 250-member Bengal Legislative Assembly. The Indian National Congress, although the largest single party with 52 seats, chose not to form a government in Bengal, partly due to its national policy of avoiding coalition governments in provinces where it lacked a clear majority.

Instead, A.K. Fazlul Huq, leader of the Krishak Praja Party (KPP), succeeded in forming a coalition ministry. The KPP had won 36 seats, mostly in rural Muslim constituencies. To secure a working majority, Huq entered into an alliance with the All-India Muslim League, which had won 39 seats, particularly from urban Muslim areas and elite Muslim voters. The coalition also included support from independent Muslim legislators, some Scheduled Caste leaders. On April 1, 1937, Fazlul Huq was sworn in as the first Prime Minister of Bengal, under the provisions of the Government of India Act 1935.

=== Coalition tensions ===
Despite initially cooperating with the Muslim League, Huq maintained a degree of independence from its central leadership, which led to increasing tension. Huq prioritized regional and economic issues over communal ones, advocating land reforms and peasant welfare, often in opposition to the elite Muslim landlords who supported the League.

By 1941, the tensions had grown severe, and Huq broke away from the Muslim League. He later joined hands with the Hindu Mahasabha in a controversial move that further alienated both Muslim and Hindu hardliners.

=== Dismissal of the government ===
The collapse of trust among coalition partners, widespread food shortages, inflation caused by World War II, and mounting communal tensions gradually eroded the legitimacy of Huq's government. In March 1943, the Governor of Bengal, exercising his authority under the Government of India Act 1935, dismissed Huq's ministry on grounds of political instability and loss of Assembly support. Huq's dismissal marked the end of Bengal's first elected provincial government.

== Further sources ==
- Jahanara Begum: The Bengal Legislature of 1937 and Its Characteristics. Proceedings of the Indian History Congress, Vol. 36 (1975), pp. 485–492 (online version at JSTOR)
- David Denis Taylor: Indian Politics and the Elections of 1937. D.Phil. thesis, University of London 1971. ProQuest Number: 11010433 (online version)
- Shila Sen: Muslim Politics in Bengal 1937-47. Impex India: New Delhi, 1976 (online summary)
