= Nandail Upazila =

Nandail নান্দাইল
- Upazila
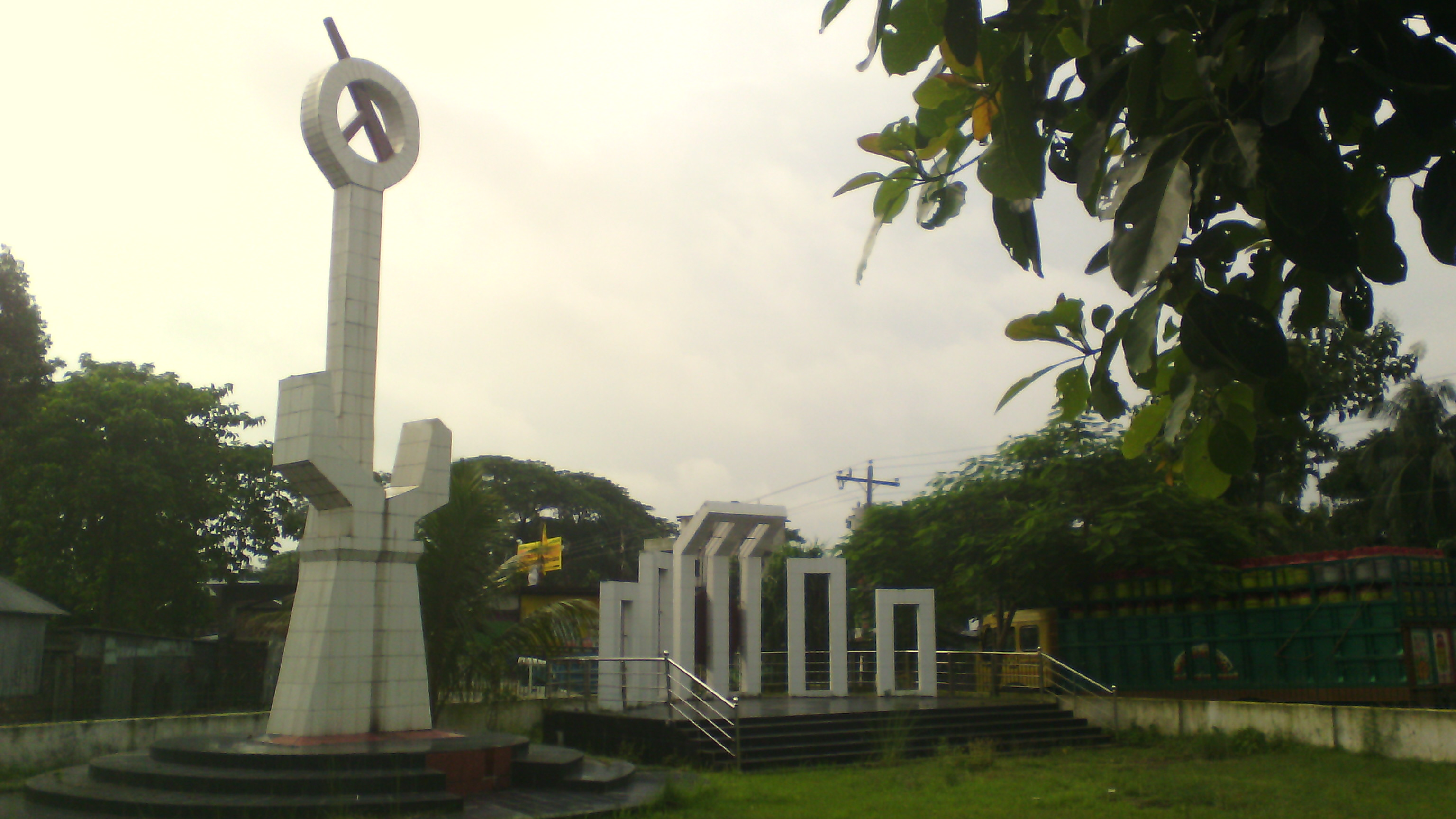
- Nandail Shaheed Minar

- Coordinates: 24.570382°N 90.690636°E
- Country: Bangladesh
- Division: Mymensingh
- District: Mymensingh
- Headquarters: Nandail

Area
  - Total: 326.37 km^{2} (126.01 sq mi)

Population (2022)
  - Total: 421,279
  - Density: 1,290.8/km^{2} (3,343.2/sq mi)
- Time zone: UTC+6 (BST)
- Postal code: 2290
- Website: nandail.mymensingh.gov.bd

Nandail (Bengali: নান্দাইল) is an upazila of Mymensingh District in the division of Mymensingh, Bangladesh, and is located roughly 46 kilometers from Mymensingh city.

== History ==
During the rule of Alauddin Husain Shah, Muazzamabad (currently, Muazzampur) was the administrative headquarters of East Bengal. The British established Neel Kuthi (Indigo center) in the 18th century at the Razbari Bazaar of Nandail, and the indigo revolt started in the area.

In 1971 Nandail suffered many losses. On 21 April, the Pakistan army killed 18 people and burned a few hundred houses in the Rajgati, Shuvokhila, and Kaliganj areas. On 17 November, a total of 27 freedom fighters including Illias Uddin Bhuiyan, Shamsul Haque, Zillul Baki, Thana Awami, and Shahnewaz Bhuiyan were killed in a battle with Pakistan. This day is now observed as the Nandail Shaheed Day.

== Geography ==
Nandail is located at 24.5667°N 90.6833°E. It has 87,523 households and a total area of 326.37 km^{2}. It is bounded by Ishwarganj Upazila to the north, Hossainpur and Kishoreganj Sadar Upazilas to the south, Kendua and Tarail Upazilas to the east, Trishal and Gaffargaon Upazilas to the west. The old Brahmaputra and Narsunda rivers are almost gone; and noted depressions are Talar Kur, Zilla Beel, Hamai Beel, Aralia Beel, Balda Beel, Bapail beel and Tongi Beel.

== Demographics ==
Historical population
Year	Pop.	±%
1981	284,841	—
1991	328,847	+15.4%
2001	370,850	+12.8%
2011	402,727	+8.6%
2022	421,279	+4.6%
Source: Bangladesh Bureau of Statistics

Religions in Nandail Upazila (2022)
Religion	Percent
Islam	98.24%
Hinduism	1.75%
Other or not stated	0.01%

According to the 2022 Bangladeshi census, Nandail Upazila had 101,724 households and a population of 421,279. 11.06% of the population were under 5 years of age. Nandail had a literacy rate (age 7 and over) of 66.03%: 66.61% for males and 65.50% for females, and a sex ratio of 92.64 males for 100 females. 55,081 (13.08%) lived in urban areas.

== Economy ==
Nandail upazila has an agrarian-based economy. The dominant occupations (by percentage) are:

- Agriculture: 50.14%
- Forestry and fishing: 1.03%
- Agricultural labourer: 16.9%
- Wage labourer: 1.82%
- Commerce: 6.19%
- Services: 6.43%
- Other: 7.49%

The land is divided into cultivable and fallow land. Jute, paddy, wheat, potato, gourd, and aubergine are the main crops. There are few flour and textile mills, and other industries include cottage industries, weaving, bamboo work, blacksmiths, goldsmiths, potteries, tailoring, welding, and wood work.

== Administration ==
Nandail Upazila mauza geocode map

Nandail upazila was established on 15 December 1982.

Nandail Upazila is divided into Nandail Municipality and 12 union parishads: Achargaon, Batagoir, Chandipasha, Gangail, Jahangirpur, Kharua, Muajjempur, Mushulli, Nandail, Rajgati, Sherpur, and Singroil. The union parishads are subdivided into 163 mauzas and 265 villages.

Nandail Municipality is subdivided into 9 wards and 20 mahallas.

The area of the Pouroshova is 13.05 km^{2}. It has a population of 28,045 – male 50.34%, female 49.66%. The population density is 2149 per km^{2}. The literacy rate among the town is 37.5%.

== Education ==
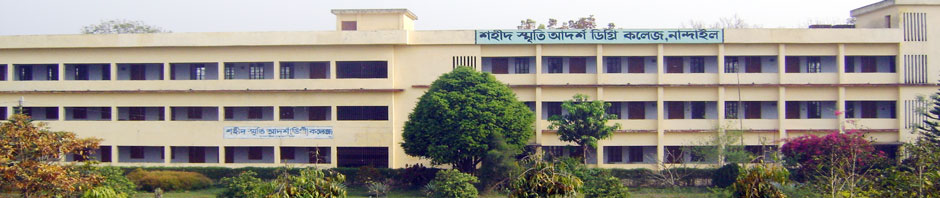
Shaheed Smriti Adarsha College, main building

There are seven colleges in the upazila. They include Khurram Khan Chowdhury Degree College, Samurta Jhan Mohila College, and Shaheed Smriti Adarsha College, founded in 1972.

According to Banglapedia, Chandipasha Government High School, founded in 1915, and Nandail Road High School are notable secondary schools.

The madrasa education system includes seven fazil madrasas.

== Notable people ==
- AKM Shamsul Islam, Defence Adviser to the Prime Minister of Bangladesh
- Shahid Akhand, novelist, was born at Paschim Darilla in 1935.
- Yasser Khan Choudhury, Member of Parliament & Ministry of Information and Broadcasting (Bangladesh).
- Aasha Mehreen Amin, former head of The Daily Star editorial team
- Nurul Amin (1893–1974), 8th Prime Minister of Pakistan
- Rafiq Uddin Bhuiyan (1928–1996), language activist and politician
- Jamal Bhuyan (born 1990), captain of the Bangladesh national football team
- Anwarul Hossain Khan Chowdhury, founding member of the Bangladesh Nationalist Party
- Khurram Khan Chowdhury (1946–2021), founding member of the Jatiya Party
- Anwarul Abedin Khan, former politician
- Khaleque Nawaz Khan (1926–1971).
- Zahurul Islam Khan, Bikalpa Dhara politician
- Kudratullah Mandal, parliamentarian
- Abdus Salam (born 1942), retired major general
- Zayn Siddique, American attorney and political advisor
- A.K. Mosharraf Hossain, politician

== See also ==
- Upazilas of Bangladesh.
- Districts of Bangladesh.
- Divisions of Bangladesh.
