= Anwarul Hossain Khan Chowdhury =

Bangladesh Nationalist Party politician

- আনোয়ারুল হোসেন খান চৌধুরী

Member of Bangladesh Parliament
- In office 1991–1996
- Preceded by: Rafiq Uddin Bhuiyan
- Succeeded by: Abdus Salam

Personal details
- Born: Nandail, Mymensingh District
- Died: 20 January 2023 (aged 79)
- Party: Bangladesh Nationalist Party
- Relatives: Khurram Khan Chowdhury (brother); ASHK Sadek (brother-in-law)

Anwarul Hossain Khan Chowdhury (Bengali: আনোয়ারুল হোসেন খান চৌধুরী; died 20 January 2023) was a Bangladesh Nationalist Party politician and a former member of parliament for Mymensingh-9. He was an advisor to former President Ziaur Rahman.

== Early life and family ==
Anwarul Hossain Khan Chowdhury was born into the Bengali Muslim Khan-Chowdhury family of Nandail in Mymensingh District. His father, Ashraf Hossain Khan Chowdhury, was the zamindar of Nandail, the former vice-president of the Central Muslim League and a cousin of former president Nurul Amin. His younger brother is Khurram Khan Chowdhury and his wife, Begum Rahat, was the sister of former education minister ASHK Sadek and daughter of Yahya Sadeq, former joint-commissioner of the Bengal Legislative Assembly.

== Career ==
Choudhury was elected to parliament from Mymensingh-9 as a Bangladesh Nationalist Party candidate in 1979. Chowdhury was the convener and later president of Bangladesh Nationalist Party's Mymensingh North branch. He was the founder of Zia Hall at the University of Dacca and an elected member of the Senate and Syndicate of University of Dacca. He was elected as a member of parliament from Mymensingh-9 (Nandail) constituency on the nomination of Bangladesh Nationalist Party in the fifth national parliamentary election of 1979, 1991 and again in 1996.

== Death ==
He died on 20 January 2023 in Dhaka at the age of 79.
