= Yasser Khan Choudhury =

Bangladeshi politician

- ইয়াসির খান চৌধুরী
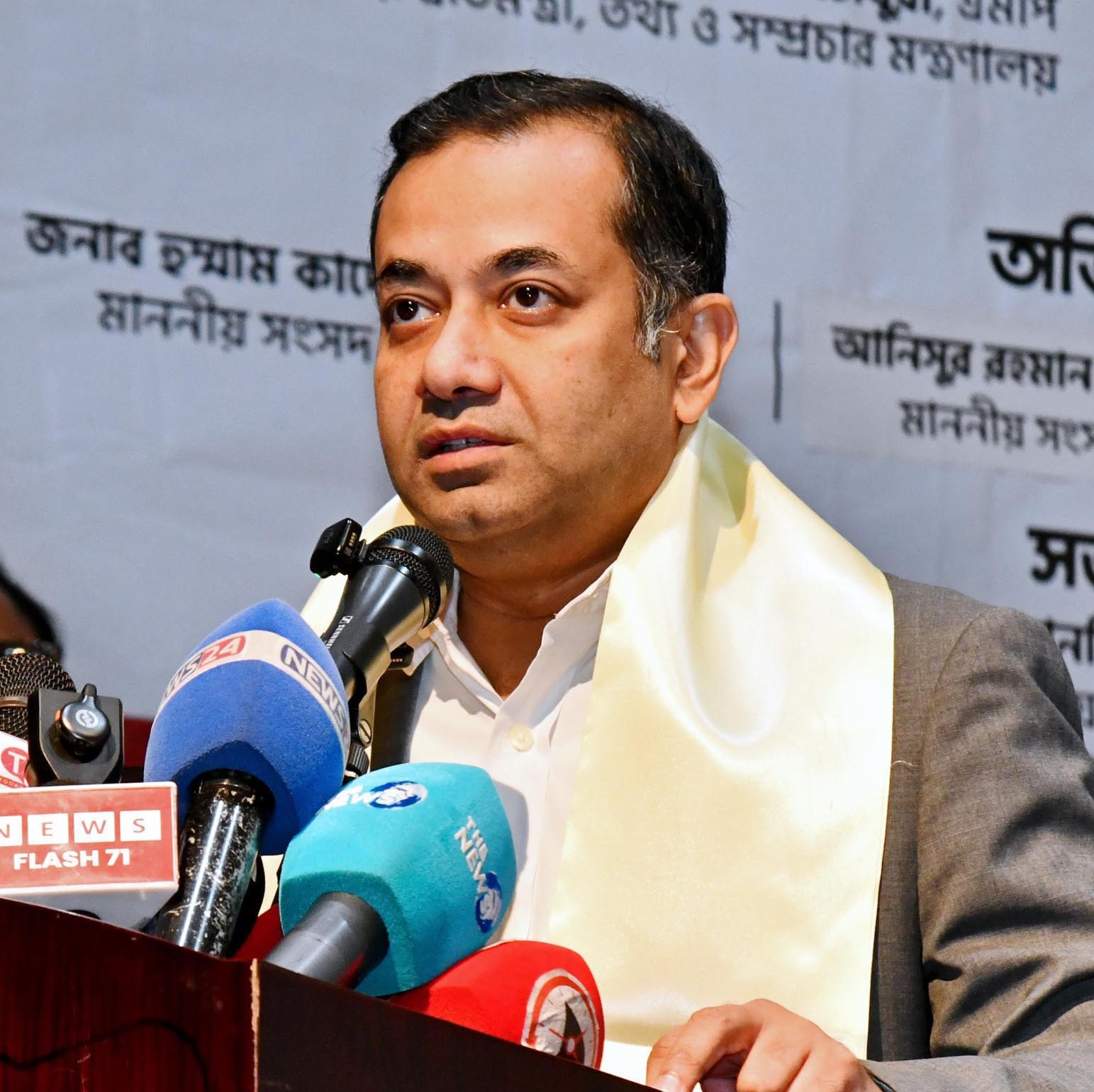
- Choudhury at inauguration of film 'Mayer Daak', Bangladesh Film Archive in 2026

Minister of State for Information and Broadcasting
- Incumbent
- Assumed office 17 February 2026
- Prime Minister: Tarique Rahman
- Preceded by: Mohammad A Arafat

Member of Parliament
- Incumbent
- Assumed office 17 February 2026
- Preceded by: Abdus Salam
- Constituency: Mymensingh-9

Personal details
- Born: 18 February 1984 (age 42) Nandail, Mymensingh, Bangladesh
- Party: Bangladesh Nationalist Party

Yasser Khan Choudhury (1982) is a Bangladeshi politician affiliated with Bangladesh Nationalist Party. He is the incumbent Minister of State for Information and Broadcasting and the incumbent Jatiya Sangsad member representing the Mymensingh-9 constituency since February 2026.

== Early life ==
He was born on 18 February 1982 in Moazzempur village, Nandail upazila, Mymensingh district. His father, Anwarul Hossain Khan Chowdhury, was elected from Mymensingh-9 constituency in the 1991 National Parliament election.

== Career ==
Yaser Khan Chowdhury is an information technology scientist. He has worked in the Information Technology Department of the BBC Television Network London for a long time.

He was the convener of the Bangladesh Nationalist Party's Nandail Upazila.

In the 13th National Parliament election of 2026, he received 85,761 votes, while his nearest rival AKM Anwarul Islam received 71,168 votes. As a result, he won the 13th National Parliament election representing the Bangladesh Nationalist Party from the Mymensingh-9 constituency. Later, he took charge as the State Minister of the Ministry of Information and Broadcasting of the Government of the People's Republic of Bangladesh.

State Minister for Information and Broadcasting Yasser Khan Chowdhury has been nominated as the new chairman of the Journalists' Welfare Trust.
