= Sanjida Islam Choya =

Bangladeshi human rights activist (born 2001)

- সানজিদা ইসলাম ছোঁয়া
- Born: 2001 (age 24–25); Achargaon Union, Mymensingh Division, Bangladesh
- Education: Gurudayal Government College
- Occupation: Child marriage activist
- Years active: 2014–present
- Organization: Ghashforing
- Honours: BBC 100 Women (2022)

Sanjida Islam Choya (Bengali: সানজিদা ইসলাম ছোঁয়া; born 2001) is a Bangladeshi human rights activist. In 2022, she was named as one of the BBC's 100 Women, in response to her ongoing work challenging child marriage in Mymensingh District.

== Biography ==
Choya was born in 2001 in Jhaungura, a village in Achargaon Union, Nandail Upazila, Mymensingh District. Her father worked for the local government and her mother was a housewife.

As a child, Choya became a member of the Child Forum on World Vision, where she learned about issues facing children in Bangladesh, including child marriage; over 50% of Bangladeshi women are married before the age of 18. Choya's mother had been a victim of child marriage when she was 15, which prevented her from completing her studies. In 2014, while studying at Nandail Pilot Girls High School, other pupils who were aware of Choya's involvement with the Child Forum informed her about a pupil whose parents were in the process of arranging her wedding. Choya reported this to the local Upazila Nirbahi Officer and local police, who were able to prevent the marriage from going ahead.

Following this incident, Choya and six other pupils established Ghashforing (lit. 'grasshopper'), a non-governmental organisation that initially focused on gathering information about local child marriages in Mymensingh and reporting these to the relevant authorities. By 2019, it was estimated that Ghashforing had prevented at least 50 weddings of underage children from going ahead. After graduating, Choya studied management at Gurudayal Government College in Kishoreganj and researched child marriage. Ghashforing has since broadened its scope, training more volunteers to both recognise and report signs of potential child marriages, and also to educate people about them.

== Reception ==
Choya has received praise and criticism for her activism, with some supporting her attempts to ban child marriage, including the Upazila Nirbahi. The BBC featured her in a radio programme, Hello Check!, which was broadcast across Bangladesh, and in 2022 it named her as one of the year's 100 most inspiring women. Other residents of Mymensingh have threatened Choya, believing her activism goes against their culture; in 2019, Choya was threatened with bamboo sticks and chased from a wedding she was attempting to disrupt.
