= A. M. Badrul Ala =

Bangladeshi politician

Member of Bangladesh Parliament
- In office 1979–1982
- Preceded by: Abul Islam
- Succeeded by: Abdul Halim

Personal details
- Party: Bangladesh Nationalist Party

A. M. Badrul Ala is a Bangladesh Nationalist Party politician and a former member of parliament for Jessore-6.

== Career ==
Ala was elected to parliament from Jessore-6 as a Bangladesh Nationalist Party candidate in 1979.
