= Abdul Kader (politician) =

Bangladeshi politician

- আব্দুল কাদের

Member of Parliament for Jessore-6
- In office 1988–1990
- Preceded by: Abdul Halim
- Succeeded by: Md. Shakhawat Hossain

Personal details
- Born: Jessore District
- Party: Jatiya Party

Abdul Kader is a politician of Jessore District of Bangladesh and former member of parliament for the Jessore-6 constituency in 1988.

== Birth and early life ==
Kader was born in Jessore district.

== Career ==
Abdul Kader is a lawyer. He was associated with the politics of the Jatiya Party. He was elected to parliament from the Jessore-6 constituency as an independent candidate in 1988 Bangladeshi general election. In the fifth parliamentary elections of 1991, he was defeated by the Jatiya Party.
