= Khurram Khan Chowdhury =

Bangladeshi politician (died 2021)

Member of Bangladesh Parliament

Personal details
- Born: 1945 or 1946 Bangladesh
- Died: 17 July 2021 (aged 75) United Hospital, Dhaka
- Party: Bangladesh Nationalist Party
- Other political affiliations: Jatiya Party (Ershad)
- Relatives: Anwarul Hossain Khan Chowdhury (brother)

Khurram Khan Chowdhury (1945/6 – 17 July 2021) was a Bangladeshi politician who served four terms in parliament. Initially elected as a member of the Bangladesh Nationalist Party (BNP), he resigned from the BNP, joined the Jatiya Party, and later returned to the BNP.

== Early life and family ==
Khurram Khan Chowdhury was born into the Bengali Muslim Khan-Chowdhury family of Nandail in Mymensingh District. His father, Ashraf Hossain Khan Chowdhury, was the zamindar of Nandail, the former vice-president of the Central Muslim League and a cousin of former president Nurul Amin. His elder brother is Anwarul Hossain Khan Chowdhury and his sister-in-law, Begum Rahat, was the sister of former education minister ASHK Sadek and daughter of Yahya Sadeq, former joint-commissioner of the Bengal Legislative Assembly.

== Career ==
Choudhury was a founding member of the Jatiya Party. He was elected member of parliament for Jatiya Party and BNP candidates at different times.

Chowdhury left the BNP to contest the 1988 general election as a Jatiya Party candidate, and was elected for Mymensingh-9. At the next election, in 1991, he was elected member of parliament for Mymensingh-8.

He rejoined the BNP, and was elected to parliament from Mymensingh-9 in 2001.

Chowdhury died from complications of COVID-19 on 17 July 2021 in Dhaka at age 75 during the COVID-19 pandemic in Bangladesh.
