= Md Azizul Islam =

Bangladeshi Member of Parliament

Member of the Bangladesh Parliament for Jessore-6
- In office 10 January 2024 – 6 August 2024
- Preceded by: Shahin Chakladar
- Succeeded by: Md. Moktar Ali

Personal details
- Born: 15 April 1995 (age 31) Keshabpur Upazila, Jessore District, Bangladesh
- Party: Bangladesh Awami League
- Children: 1
- Parent: Khandkar Rafiquzzaman

Md Azizul Islam (born 15 April 1995) is an Awami League politician and a former Jatiya Sangsad member representing the Jessore-6 constituency.

== Early and educational life ==
Islam was born on 15 April 1995 in Jessore Keshabpur Upazila. His father, Khandaker Rafiquzzaman, was a government officer (d. 2016). He has 3 brothers. He studied in the Hifz Department of Ashraful Uloom Madrasa as a teenager.

== Career ==
Islam was elected to Parliament in January 2024 as an independent candidate, beating incumbent Md Shaheen Chaklader who was the candidate of the Awami League.
