= Bengal Legislative Assembly (disambiguation) =

Bengal Legislative Assembly may refer to:

- Bengal Legislative Assembly (1937—1947)
- East Bengal Legislative Assembly
- West Bengal Legislative Assembly
