= Mymensingh-9 =

Constituency of Bangladesh's Jatiya Sangsad

Coordinates: 24.57°N 90.69°E

- Constituency for the Jatiya Sangsad
- District: Mymensingh District
- Division: Mymensingh Division
- Electorate: 384,641 (2026)

Current constituency
- Created: 1973
- Parliamentary Party: Bangladesh Nationalist Party
- Member of Parliament: Yaser Khan Chowdhury
- ← 153 Mymensingh-8 155 Mymensingh-10 →

Mymensingh-9 is a constituency represented in the Jatiya Sangsad (National Parliament) of Bangladesh.

== Boundaries ==
The constituency encompasses Nandail Upazila.

== History ==
The constituency was created for the first general elections in newly independent Bangladesh, held in 1973.

== Members of Parliament ==
Election	Member	Party
1973	Kudratullah Mandal	Bangladesh Awami League
1979	Habib Ullah Sarkar	Bangladesh Nationalist Party
1986	Rafiq Uddin Bhuiyan	Bangladesh Awami League
1988	Khurram Khan Chowdhury	Jatiya Party (Ershad)
1991	Anwarul Hossain Khan Chowdhury	Bangladesh Nationalist Party
Feb 1996	Zahurul Islam Khan	Bangladesh Nationalist Party
Jun 1996	Abdus Salam	Bangladesh Awami League
2001	Khurram Khan Chowdhury	Bangladesh Nationalist Party
2008	Abdus Salam	Bangladesh Awami League
2014	Anwarul Abedin Khan	Bangladesh Awami League
2024	Abdus Salam	Bangladesh Awami League
2026	Yaser Khan Chowdhury	Bangladesh Nationalist Party

== Elections ==
=== Elections in the 2020s ===
General election 2026: Mymensingh-9
Party	Candidate	Votes	%	±%
BNP	Yaser Khan Chowdhury	85,761	54.70	+24.30
BDP	AKM Anwarul Islam Chan	71,168	45.30	New
Majority		14,593	9.40	−28.20
Turnout		196,443	51.06	−30.44
Registered electors		384,641		
BNP gain from AL				

=== Elections in the 2010s ===
Anwarul Abedin Khan was re-elected unopposed in the 2014 general election after opposition parties withdrew their candidacies in a boycott of the election.

=== Elections in the 2000s ===
General Election 2008: Mymensingh-9
Party	Candidate	Votes	%	±%
AL	Abdus Salam	127,309	68.0	+29.3
BNP	Khurrum Khan Choudhury	56,843	30.4	−13.5
BDB	Jahurul Islam Khan	2,573	1.4	N/A
Independent	A. S. M. Akram	475	0.3	N/A
Majority		70,466	37.6	+32.4
Turnout		187,200	81.5	+16.7
AL gain from BNP				

General Election 2001: Mymensingh-9
Party	Candidate	Votes	%	±%
BNP	Khurram Khan Chowdhury	65,992	43.9	+16.4
AL	Abdus Salam	58,157	38.7	−0.5
Independent	Md. Abdul Matin Bhuiya	18,553	12.3	N/A
IJOF	Md. Abdul Hakim Bhuiya	7,018	4.7	N/A
Independent	Kamrun Mohiuddin	410	0.3	N/A
Jatiya Party (M)	Md. Abubakar Siddiq	250	0.2	N/A
Majority		7,835	5.2	−5.9
Turnout		150,380	64.8	+5.8
BNP gain from AL				

=== Elections in the 1990s ===
General Election June 1996: Mymensingh-9
Party	Candidate	Votes	%	±%
AL	Abdus Salam	41,182	39.2	+4.4
JP(E)	Md. Jaharul Islam Khan	29,522	28.1	+27.6
BNP	Khurram Khan Chowdhury	28,923	27.5	−13.7
IOJ	Saidur Rahman	1,814	1.7	N/A
Jamaat	Sams Uddin Ahmed	1,786	1.7	−4.2
Zaker Party	Md. Samsul Haque Tahakur	878	0.8	−0.6
Gano Forum	A. S. M. Akram	659	0.6	N/A
FP	Md. Alim Uddin	295	0.3	N/A
Majority		11,660	11.1	+4.7
Turnout		105,059	59.0	+17.4
AL gain from BNP				

General Election 1991: Mymensingh-9
Party	Candidate	Votes	%	±%
BNP	Anwarul Hossain Khan Chowdhury	33,107	41.2	
AL	Rafiq Uddin Bhuiyan	27,981	34.8	
Independent	Nurul Karim	4,800	6.0	
Jamaat	Moazzem Hossain	4,715	5.9	
JSD	Gias Uddin	3,065	3.8	
Independent	Faruk Miah	2,053	2.6	
Bangladesh Janata Party	A. K. M. Mahbubul Karim	1,958	2.4	
Zaker Party	Md. Aminul Islam Vuiyan	1,103	1.4	
NDP	Md. Alim Uddin Fakir	564	0.7	
JP(E)	Abdur Rashid	422	0.5	
Jatiya Samajtantrik Dal-JSD	Md. Nazim Uddin	365	0.5	
CPB	Shamsul Bari	256	0.3	
Majority		5,126	6.4	
Turnout		80,389	41.6	
BNP gain from				
