= Abdul Halim (Jessore politician) =

Bangladeshi politician

Member of Bangladesh Parliament
- In office 1986–1988
- Preceded by: A. M. Badrul Ala
- Succeeded by: Abdul Kader

Personal details
- Party: Jatiya Party (Ershad)

Abdul Halim is a Jatiya Party (Ershad) politician in Bangladesh and a former member of parliament for Jessore-6.

== Career ==
Halim was elected to parliament from Jessore-6 as a Jatiya Party candidate in 1986.
