= ASHK Sadek =

Bangladeshi politician

ASHK Sadique

Minister of Education
- In office 23 June 1996 – 15 July 2001
- Preceded by: Muhammad Yunus (as Adviser) Muhammad Jamiruddin Sircar
- Succeeded by: Osman Faruk

Member of Parliament for Jessore-6
- In office 1996–2006
- Preceded by: Md. Shakhawat Hossain
- Succeeded by: S. K. Abdul Wahab

Personal details
- Born: 30 April 1934 Jessore District, Bengal Presidency, British India
- Died: 9 September 2007 (aged 73)
- Party: Bangladesh Awami League
- Spouse: Ismat Ara Sadique
- Relatives: Anwarul Hossain Khan Chowdhury (brother-in-law)
- Education: Williams College; University of Cambridge; University of Calcutta

Abu Sharaf Hizbul Qader Sadique (Bengali: আবু শরফ হিজবুল কাদের সাদেক; 30 April 1934 – 9 September 2007) was a Bangladesh Awami League politician, who was a Jatiya Sangsad member representing the Jessore-6 constituency, and a former Education Minister of Bangladesh.

== Early life and education ==
Sadique was born on 30 April 1934 to a Bengali Muslim family in the village of Barenga in Keshabpur, Jessore District. His father, Yahya Sadique, was the joint commissioner of the Government of Bengal. His younger sister, Begum Rahat, was the wife of politician Anwarul Hossain Khan Chowdhury.

Sadique completed his matriculation in 1949 and his intermediate in 1951. In 1954, he completed his Bachelor of Arts (honours) in economics and received his Master of Arts from the University of Calcutta in 1955. He then moved to the United Kingdom where he studied economics and political science at the Queens' College of the University of Cambridge in 1959. He also completed studies of economics at Williams College in Massachusetts, United States.

== Career ==
Sadique joined the civil service of Pakistan in 1956. From 1959 to 1961, he served as the sub-divisional officer of Nilphamari and Narayanganj. He worked as the Comilla deputy commissioner from 1966 to 1967 and the secretary to the Governor of East Pakistan from 1969 to 1970. He was the secretary to Tajuddin Ahmad, the then Prime Minister of Bangladesh and later chief secretary to the President of Bangladesh. He was a secretary of a number of ministries and retired from government service in 1988. In 1996 he was elected to the national parliament from Jessore-6 and again in 2001. He was a Minister of Education, Science, and Technology in the cabinet of Sheikh Hasina.

== Death and legacy ==
Sadique died on 9 September 2007. His wife, Ismat Ara Sadique, was a state minister of Sheikh Hasina's government. ASHK Sadique auditorium in Keshabpur is named after him.
