= Razia Khan =

Bangladeshi writer, poet, and educationist (1936–2011)

- রাজিয়া খান
- Born: c. 1936
- Died: 28 December 2011 (aged 74–75); Dhaka, Bangladesh
- Spouse: Anwarul Amin Makhon
- Children: Aasha Mehreen Amin (daughter)
- Father: Maulvi Tamizuddin Khan
- Relatives: Nurul Amin (father-in-law)
- Awards: full list

Razia Khan Amin (1936 – 28 December 2011) was a Bangladeshi writer, poet and educationist. She was also a journalist, theatre actor and columnist for newspapers. She was awarded Ekushey Padak in 1997 for her contribution to education by the Government of Bangladesh.

== Education and career ==
Khan's father Maulvi Tamizuddin Khan was a politician and a social activist.

Khan completed her bachelor's degree and masters in English from the University of Dhaka. She went to University of Birmingham on a scholarship from the British Council for higher studies.

Khan joined the editorial board of the then Pakistan Observer (later renamed The Bangladesh Observer). She then joined as a faculty member of the Department of English of the University of Dhaka.

At the age of 18, Khan wrote her first novel Bot tolar Upannayash in 1958.

== Personal life ==
Khan was married to Anwarul Amin Makhon, the second-eldest son of former Prime Minister of Pakistan Nurul Amin. Anwarul Amin Makhon was the former general manager of BCCI Bangladesh and opened Bangladesh Bank's first branch abroad (in London). The couple had two children: banker Kaiser Tamiz Amin and journalist Aasha Mehreen Amin.

== Works ==
=== Novels ===
- Bot tolar Upannayash (Novel of the Wayside, 1959)
- Anukalpa (The Alrternative, 1959)
- Proticitra (The Blue-Print, 1975)
- Citra-kabya (Picturesque Verses, 1980)
- He Mohajibon (O! Eternal Life, 1983)
- Draupadi (1992)
- Padatik (The Pedestrian, 1996)
- Brhastonir
- Shikhor Himaddrir
- Bandi Bihongo

== Awards ==
- PEN Lay Writing Award (1956)
- Pope Gold Medal (1957)
- Bangla Academy Literary Award (1975)
- Qamar Mushtari Gold Medal (1985)
- Ekushey Padak (1997)
- Lekhika Sangha Gold Medal (1998)
- Druhee Katha-Shahityak Abdur Rouf Choudhury Memorial Award (1999)
- Anannya Literature Award (2003)
