= Khaleque Nawaz Khan =

Bangladeshi politician

- Born: 26 March 1926; Nandail, Mymensingh, British India
- Died: 2 October 1971 (aged 45); East Pakistan
- Education: University of Dhaka
- Political party: Awami League
- Awards: Ekushey Padak (2008)

Khaleque Nawaz Khan (26 March 1926 – 2 October 1971) was a Pakistani Bengali language activist, politician and lawyer belonging to Awami League. He was a member of the East Bengal Legislative Assembly. He was conferred with Ekushey Padak posthumously in 2008 for his contribution to the Bengali language movement.

== Biography ==
Khan was born on 26 March 1926 at Achargaon in Nandail of Mymensingh. His father Elahi Nawaz Khan was a sub deputy magistrate and his mother Altafunnesa was a housewife. He completed matriculation from Nandail Chandipasha High School in 1942. Later, he completed intermediate studies from Islamia College in 1944. After that, he got admitted into Dhaka University graduated from there in 1948. Later, he received LLB degree from there in 1952. During his student life he was elected as the vice president of Baker Hostel Students' Union in 1944. He was the founding general secretary of East Pakistan Muslim Chhatra League.

Khan took part in the Language Movement. He was a member of the Rastrabhasa Sangram Parishad. He took part in picketing on 11 January 1948 as a part of hartal and he was arrested for this.

Khan also took part in the Language Movement in February 1952. An arrest warrant was issued against him on 28 February 1952. Later, he was arrested. He was released in January 1953.

Khan was elected as a member of the East Bengal Legislative Assembly in 1954. He beat then Chief Minister of East Bengal Nurul Amin in the election.

Khan died on 2 October 1971 at the age of 45. After his death he was conferred with Ekushey Padak posthumously in 2008 for his contribution to the Language Movement.
