= Sheikh Abdul Wahab =

Bangladeshi politician

S. K. Abdul Wahab

Member of Parliament for Jessore-6
- In office 2009–2014
- Preceded by: ASHK Sadek
- Succeeded by: Ismat Ara Sadek

Personal details
- Party: Bangladesh Awami League

S. K. Abdul Wahab is a Bangladeshi politician and a former Jatiya Sangsad member representing the Jessore-6 constituency.

== Career ==
Wahab was elected to parliament from Jessore-6 as a Bangladesh Awami League candidate in 2008. He served as the whip of the government party in parliament.
