= Nagendra Narayan Ray =

Bengali politician

Nagendra Nath Roy is a Bengali politician and Minister who served in the second cabinet of Prime Minister of Bengal H. S. Suhrawardy from 23 April 1946 to 14 August 1947. He represented Rangpur District and the Rajbanshi people in the Bengal Legislative Assembly.
