= Shahid Akhand =

Bangladeshi writer (1935–2024)

- শহীদ আখন্দ
- Born: 21 January 1935; Nandail, Mymensingh
- Died: October 2024 (aged 89)

Shahid Akhand (21 January 1935 – October 2024) was a Bangladeshi author and novelist of Bengali literature.

== Biography ==
Akhand was born on 21 January 1935 in Mymensingh district. He completed a master's degree in Bengali at Dhaka University in 1959.

He began writing in the second decade after the Partition of Bengal (1947). His novel Panna Holo Sobuj depicted urban middle-class life.

In 1978, he won a Bangla Academy Literary Award for a short story. In 2008, a play adapted from his novel Bhetorer Manush was screened on Bangladesh Television.

He lives in Bangladesh, and has been blind for a few years. He has three daughters and a son.

Akhand died in October 2024, at the age of 89.

== Works ==
=== Novels ===
- Panna Holo Sobuj (Emerald Green, 1964)
- Pakhir Gaan Boner Chhaya (Bird Songs Forest Shades, 1970)
- Dudondo Shanti (Moments of Peace, 1971)
- Ekoda Ek Bosonte (Once in Spring Time, 1984)
- Shei Pakhi (That Bird 1986)
- Apon Sourav (Own Fragrance 1986)
- Kokhon Ke Jane (Who Knows When, 1995)
- Bhetorer Manush
