= Jessore-6 =

Constituency of Bangladesh's Jatiya Sangsad

Coordinates: 22.91°N 89.22°E

- Constituency for the Jatiya Sangsad
- District: Jessore District
- Division: Khulna Division
- Electorate: 229,163 (2026)

Current constituency
- Created: 1973
- Parliamentary Party: Bangladesh Jamaat-e-Islami
- Member of Parliament: Md. Moktar Ali
- ← 89 Jessore-5 91 Magura-1 →

Jessore-6 is a constituency represented in the Jatiya Sangsad (National Parliament) of Bangladesh, Created in 1973, Since 13 February 2026, The newly elected member of Parliament is Md. Moktar Ali.

== Boundaries ==
The constituency encompasses Keshabpur Upazila.

== History ==
The constituency was created for the first general elections in newly independent Bangladesh, held in 1973.

Ahead of the 2008 general election, the Election Commission redrew constituency boundaries to reflect population changes revealed by the 2001 Bangladesh census. The 2008 redistricting altered the boundaries of the constituency.

Ahead of the 2014 general election, the Election Commission reduced the boundaries of the constituency. Previously it included Abhaynagar Upazila and one union parishad of Manirampur Upazila: Manoharpur.

== Members of Parliament ==
Election	Member	Party
1973	Abul Islam	Bangladesh Awami League
1979	A. M. Badrul Ala	Bangladesh Nationalist Party
Major Boundary Changes
1986	Abdul Halim	Bangladesh Awami League
1988	Abdul Kader	Jatiya Party (Ershad)
1991	Md. Shakhawat Hossain	Bangladesh Jamaat-e-Islami
Feb 1996	Md. Shakhawat Hossain	Bangladesh Nationalist Party
Jun 1996	ASHK Sadek	Bangladesh Awami League
2008	S. K. Abdul Wahab	Bangladesh Awami League
2014	Ismat Ara Sadique	Bangladesh Awami League
2020 by-election	Shahin Chakladar	Bangladesh Awami League
2024	Md Azizul Islam	Independent
2026	Md. Moktar Ali	Bangladesh Jamaat-e-Islami

== Elections ==
=== Elections in the 2020s ===
General Election 2026: Jessore-6
Party	Candidate	Votes	%	±%
Jamaat	Md. Moktar Ali	92,234	52.31	+43.81
BNP	Md. Abul Hossain Azad	80,141	45.44	+3.24
Majority		12,093	6.87	−88.43
Turnout		176,347	76.95	+44.45
Registered electors		229,163		
Jamaat gain from Independent				

=== Elections in the 2010s ===
General Election 2014: Jessore-6
Party	Candidate	Votes	%	±%
AL	Ismat Ara Sadek	55,270	97.7	+40.1
BNF	Prashanta Biswas	1,328	2.3	N/A
Majority		53,942	95.3	+79.9
Turnout		56,598	32.5	−58.5
AL hold				

=== Elections in the 2000s ===
General Election 2008: Jessore-6
Party	Candidate	Votes	%	±%
AL	S. K. Abdul Wahab	166,994	57.6	+12.6
BNP	Md. Abul Hossain Azad	122,267	42.2	N/A
PDP	Quazi Shafiqul Islam	495	0.2	N/A
Majority		44,727	15.4	+15.3
Turnout		289,756	91.0	+1.0
AL hold				

General Election 2001: Jessore-6
Party	Candidate	Votes	%	±%
AL	ASHK Sadek	57,456	45.0	+10.0
Independent	Md. Sakhawat Hossain	57,292	44.9	N/A
Jamaat	Gazi Enamul Haq	10,790	8.5	−7.8
IJOF	G. M. Ershad	1,671	1.3	N/A
WPB	Abu Bakar Siddiqi	169	0.1	N/A
Independent	Abdul Halim	164	0.1	N/A
Independent	Furkan Ahmad	135	0.1	N/A
Majority		164	0.1	−4.6
Turnout		127,677	90.0	+4.9
AL hold				

=== Elections in the 1990s ===
General Election June 1996: Jessore-6
Party	Candidate	Votes	%	±%
AL	ASHK Sadek	35,293	35.0	−1.8
BNP	Md. Shakhawat Hossain	30,609	30.4	+19.5
JP(E)	G. M. Ershad	18,180	18.1	+16.9
Jamaat	Md. Moktar Ali	16,390	16.3	−31.0
Zaker Party	Md. Jahangir Kabir	248	0.3	+0.1
Majority		4.684	4.7	−5.8
Turnout		100,720	85.1	+10.6
AL gain from Jamaat				

General Election 1991: Jessore-6
Party	Candidate	Votes	%	±%
Jamaat	Md. Shakhawat Hossain	39,119	47.3	
AL	A. Halim	30,418	36.8	
BNP	Shamsul Arefin Khan	8,977	10.9	
Independent	Deen Mohammad	2,934	3.5	
JP(E)	Abdul Kader Munshi	1,001	1.2	
Zaker Party	Md. Golam Mostafa	152	0.2	
Jatiya Samajtantrik Dal-JSD	A. Latif Morol	78	0.1	
Majority		8,701	10.5	
Turnout		82,679	74.5	
Jamaat gain from				
