= Zahurul Islam Khan =

Bangladeshi politician

- জহুরুল ইসলাম খান

Member of Parliament for Mymensingh-9
- In office 15 February 1996 – 12 June 1996
- Preceded by: Anwarul Hossain Khan Chowdhury
- Succeeded by: Abdus Salam

Personal details
- Born: Mymensingh District
- Party: BNP
- Other political affiliations: Jatiya Party, Bikalpa Dhara

Zahurul Islam Khan Bikalpa Dhara Bangladesh politician. He was elected a member of parliament from Mymensingh-9 in February 1996.

== Career ==
Khan was elected to parliament from Mymensingh-9 as a Bangladesh Nationalist Party candidate in 15 February 1996 Bangladeshi general election.

He joined the Jatiya Party and was defeated for the Mymensingh-9 seat in the seventh election on 12 June 1996. He joined the Bikalpa Dhara Bangladesh party in 2004 and lost the Mymensingh-9 seat in the 2008 ninth national election.
