= Santosh Kumar Bose =

Santosh Kumar Bose was a Bengali lawyer and politician. He was a member of the Calcutta Corporation from 1926 to 1936. He was a Member of the Bengal Legislative Assembly from 1937 to 1946. He was the Deputy High Commissioner of India in Dhaka from December 1948 to 1950. He wrote a book called Reminiscences of Congress.
