= Md. Moktar Ali =

Bangladeshi Member of Parliament

Member of the Bangladesh Parliament for Jessore-6
- Incumbent
- Assumed office 17 February 2026
- Preceded by: Md Azizul Islam

Personal details
- Party: Bangladesh Jamaat-e-Islami
- Occupation: Professor, politician

Md. Moktar Ali is a professor, and a Bangladesh Jamaat-e-Islami politician and Member of Parliament (Bangladesh) representing the Jessore-6 constituency.

== Career ==
He was a professor of Govt. Keshabpur College and was also active in politics prior to his retirement. He was later elected as a Member of Parliament in the 2026 Bangladeshi general election representing Jessore-6 constituency.
