= Ismat Ara Sadique =

Bangladeshi politician (1941–2020)

- ইসমত আরা সাদেক
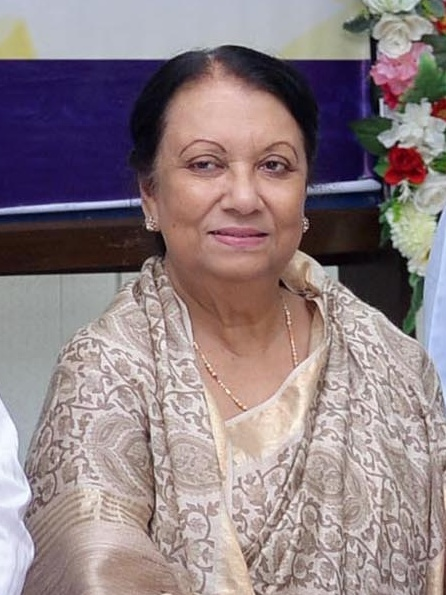
- Sadique in 2018

State Minister of Primary and Mass Education
- In office 12 January 2014 – 15 January 2014

State Minister of Public Administration
- In office 15 January 2014 – 30 December 2018
- Succeeded by: Farhad Hossain

Member of Parliament for Jessore-6
- In office 5 January 2014 – 21 January 2020
- Preceded by: Sheikh Abdul Wahab
- Succeeded by: Shahin Chakladar

Personal details
- Born: 1 September 1941 Bogra District, Bengal Presidency, British India
- Died: 21 January 2020 (aged 78) Dhaka, Bangladesh
- Party: Bangladesh Awami League
- Spouse: ASHK Sadek

Ismat Ara Sadique (1 September 1941 – 21 January 2020) was a Bangladesh Awami League politician and the state minister of the Ministry of Primary and Mass Education and Ministry of Public Administration. She was elected a Jatiya Sangsad member representing the Jessore-6 constituency from 2014 until her death.

== Early life ==
Sadique was born on 1 September 1941 in Shatani House in Bogra District. In 1956, she graduated from Bogra VM Girls school, and in 1958 from Holy Cross College, Dhaka. In 1960, she graduated from Eden College, Dhaka.

== Career ==
Sadique joined the Bangladesh Awami League in 1992. She established a women's unit in Keshabpur in 1996. From 2009 to 2013 she served in the Bangladesh Women Welfare Council. She was the president of Shathi Samajkalayan Sangstha, a charity providing free treatment to students and school supplies. She was made state minister of primary and mass education on 12 January 2014. Later, she was made the state minister of public administration on 15 January 2014.

== Personal life ==
Sadique was married to ASHK Sadek. Her husband was a Bangladesh Awami League politician, member of parliament, and former minister of education. They had two children. Her younger brother, Mamdudur Rahman Choudhury, was a former Jatiya Party minister.

== Death ==
Sadique died on 21 January 2020 at the age of 78.
