= Abdus Salam (general) =

Bangladesh Awami League Politician And Retired Major General

- আবদুস সালাম
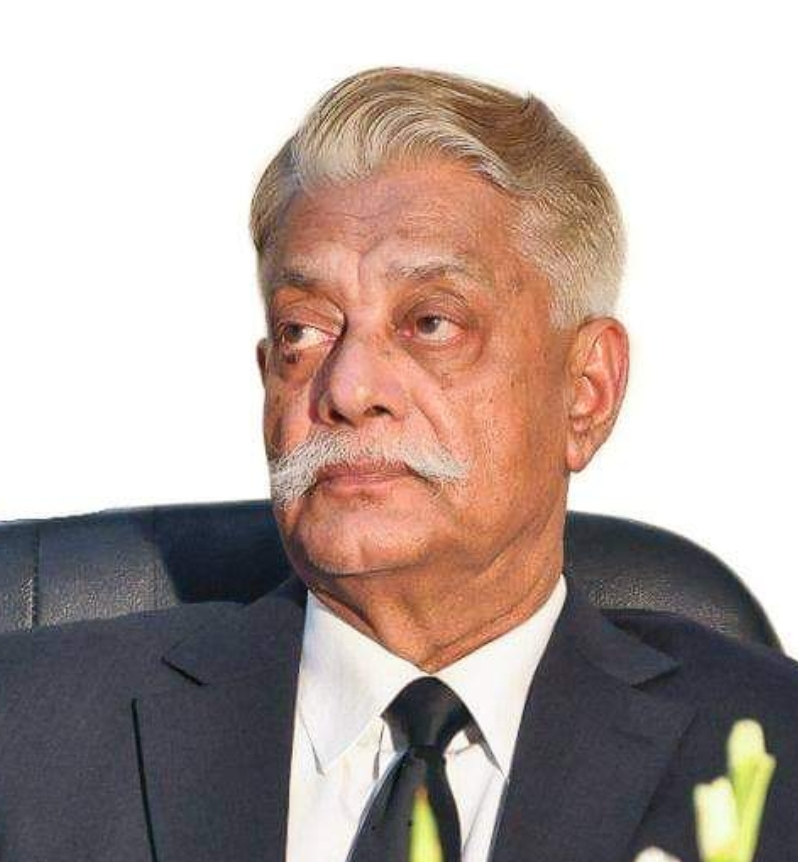
- Salam in 2024

Minister of Planning
- In office 11 January 2024 – 6 August 2024
- Prime Minister: Sheikh Hasina
- Deputy: Shahiduzzaman Sarker
- Preceded by: M A Mannan
- Succeeded by: Salehuddin Ahmed as Adviser

Member of the Bangladesh Parliament for Mymensingh-9
- In office 11 January 2024 – 6 August 2024
- Preceded by: Anwarul Abedin Khan
- In office 25 January 2009 – 24 January 2014
- Preceded by: Khurram Khan Chowdhury
- In office 14 July 1996 – 13 July 2001
- Preceded by: Zahurul Islam Khan

Principal Staff Officer of Armed Forces Division
- In office 15 September 1996 – 10 January 1999
- President: Abdur Rahman Biswas; Shahabuddin Ahmed
- Prime Minister: Sheikh Hasina
- Preceded by: Imamuzzaman Chowdhury
- Succeeded by: Mohammad Shubid Ali Bhuiyan

Personal details
- Born: 28 February 1942 (age 84) Nandail, Bengal, British India
- Party: Bangladesh Awami League

Military service
- Allegiance: Bangladesh; Pakistan (before 1972)
- Branch/service: Bangladesh Army; Pakistan Army
- Years of service: 1964–1999
- Rank: Major General
- Unit: Armoured Corps
- Commands: Principal Staff Officer of Armed Forces Division; GOC of 66th Infantry Division; GOC of 11th Infantry Division; Commander of 93rd Armoured Brigade; Commandant of Non-Commissioned Officer's Academy

Abdus Salam rcds, psc (born 28 February 1942) is a former two star army officer, cabinet minister, and politician. Affiliated with the Bangladesh Awami League, he served as a Jatiya Sangsad member representing the Mymensingh-9 constituency in 2024. On 11 January 2024, he is a former minister of the Ministry of Planning who served in 2024.

== Career ==
Salam was elected to parliament from Mymensingh-9 as an Awami League candidate in 2008. His nomination was cancelled by the Bangladesh Election Commission for defaulting on a loan. He appealed the cancellation and was subsequently elected during the appeal process. In 2013, the Bangladesh High Court cancelled his election following an appeal by an Awami League activists.

Salam was elected to parliament from Mymensingh-9 as an Awami League candidate on 7 January 2024.
