= Tulsi Charan Goswami =

Tulsi Charan Goswami was a member of the Bengal Legislative Assembly, and the General Secretary of the Bengal Provincial Congress Committee. He work born into a Zamindari family and had interests in the jute trade. His father was Raja Kishori Lal Goswami, head of the zamindar family of Sreerampore.

Tulsi Charan Goswami Street in Serampore is named after him.
