= Maulvi Tamizuddin Khan =

Pakistani politician

- মৌলভী তমিজউদ্দিন খান
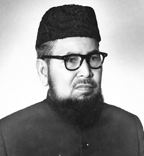

Speaker of the National Assembly
- In office 11 June 1962 – 19 August 1963
- Deputy: Mohammad Afzal Cheema
- Preceded by: Abdul Wahab Khan
- Succeeded by: Fazlul Qadir Chaudhry
- In office 14 December 1948 – 24 October 1954
- Deputy: M.H. Gazder
- Preceded by: Mohammad Ali Jinnah
- Succeeded by: Abdul Wahab Khan

Deputy Speaker of the National Assembly of Pakistan
- In office 23 February 1948 – 23 February 1948
- Preceded by: Office established
- Succeeded by: Office established

Member of the Central Legislative Assembly
- In office 1945–1947
- Preceded by: Abdul Halim Ghaznavi
- Constituency: Dacca cum Mymensingh

Personal details
- Born: March 1889 Rajbari, Bengal, British India
- Died: 19 August 1963 (aged 74) Dacca, East Pakistan, Pakistan
- Party: PMLC (1962–1963)
- Other political affiliations: PML (1947–1958); AIML (1915–1947); INC (1921–1926)
- Children: Razia Khan (daughter)
- Relatives: Aasha Mehreen Amin (granddaughter)
- Education: Presidency College, Kolkata; Surendranath College; University of Calcutta

Gazdar Maulvi Tamizuddin Khan (M. T. Khan; March 1889 – 19 August 1963) was the Speaker of Pakistan's Constituent Assembly from 1948 to 1954 and National Assembly of Pakistan between 1962 and 1963.

== Early life ==
Khan was born in March 1889 to the Bengali Muslim Khan family of Khankhanapur in Rajbari, then part of the Faridpur district of the Bengal Presidency. His father was a farmer with only three acres of land. After completing his education at the Khankhanapur High School, he got enrolled at the University of Calcutta. He completed his master's in English from the Presidency College, Calcutta in 1913 and LLB in 1915 from Ripon College now known as Surendranath College started his legal profession in Faridpur. making him the first Muslim from Faridpur district to complete a master's degree.

== Career ==
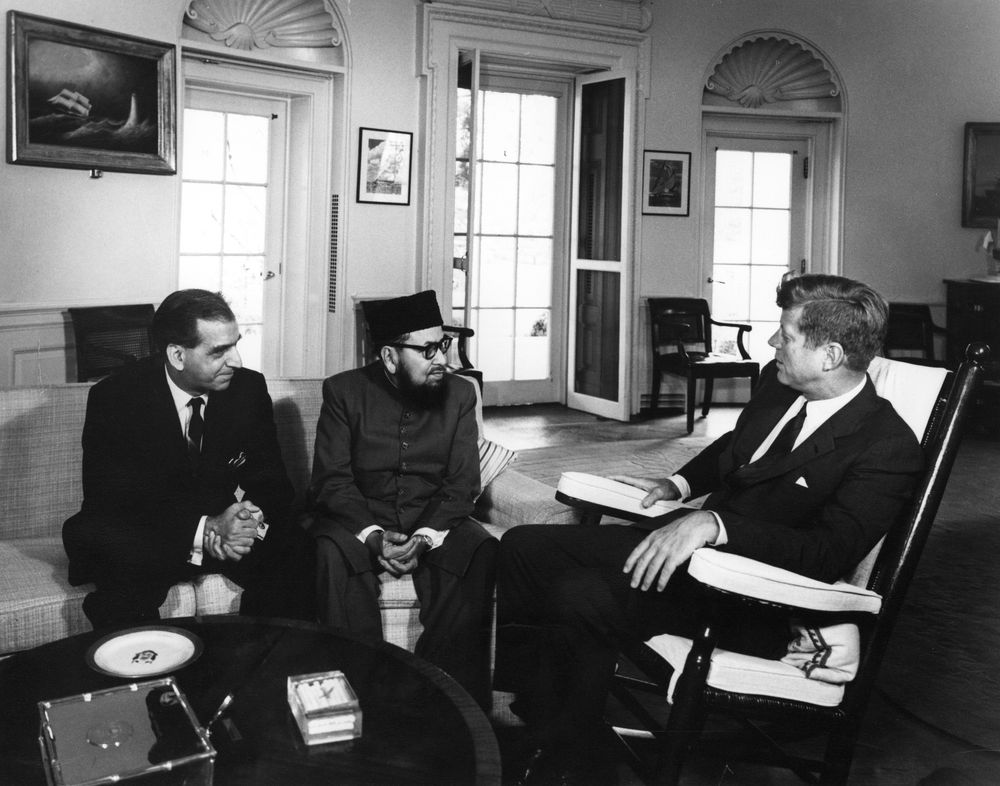
Moulvi Tamizuddin Khan with President John F.Kennedy

Khan joined non-cooperation movement led by Gandhi when he was a student. Later he joined the Indian National Congress and subsequently joined khilafat movement in 1921 and was arrested and sent to Faridpur jail and later was shifted to Central jail in Dhaka. At that time, he was an ardent follower of Chittaranjan Das.

Khan was elected vice-chairman of Faridpur Municipality. In 1926, he got elected to the Bengal Legislative Assembly from Faridpur. Khan left Congress in 1926 as he thought that the party was biased towards the Hindus He later became the secretary of the Anjuman-i-Islamia and subsequently joined the Muslim League.

He competed on a Muslim League ticket in the 1937 election and defeated the Congress candidate convincingly. Between 1937 and 1947, Khan served twice as Minister of Health, Agriculture, Industry and Education in Bengal.

Khan created history when the Constituent Assembly was dismissed by Governor General Ghulam Mohammad in 1954. Khan challenged the dismissal in the court and the case was filed in the morning of 7 November 1954 by Advocate Manzar-e-Alam. Although the High Court agreed and overturned it, the Federal Court under Justice Muhammad Munir upheld the dismissal. He had been president of the Basic Principles Committee set up in 1949.

"Justice A. R. Cornelius was the sole dissenting judge in the landmark judgment handed down by the Supreme Court in the Maulvi Tamizuddin case. That judgment altered the course of politics in Pakistan forever and sealed the fate of democracy. The law had guided him as he had interpreted it and his conscience."

The decision to uphold the dismissal of the constituent assembly was to mark the beginning of the overt role of Pakistan's military and civil establishment in Pakistani politics.

== Personal life ==
Khan's daughters were Razia Khan and Qulsum Huda Khan. Razia was an Ekushey Padak winning writer and poet, and married to Anwarul Amin Makhon, the youngest son of former Prime Minister of Pakistan Nurul Amin. They have a son named Kaiser Tamiz Amin and a daughter named Aasha Mehreen Amin. On the other hand, Qulsum was one of the founders and vice-chancellors of Central Women's University.
