= Abul Islam =

Bangladeshi politician

Member of Parliament for Jessore-6
- In office 1973–1975
- Preceded by: Constituency Established
- Succeeded by: M. A. Badrul Ali

Personal details
- Born: 1924
- Died: 20 February 2004 (aged 79-80)
- Party: Bangladesh Awami League

Abul Islam (1924 – 20 February 2004) was a Bangladeshi freedom fighter and politician from Jessore belonging to the Bangladesh Awami League. He was a member of the Jatiya Sangsad. He was known as Sabas Chairman.

== Biography ==
Islam was born on 1924 at Hajirbag in Jhikargacha of Jessore. He was elected as the chairman of the then Balla Union Parishad in 1958.

In 1964 Ayub Khan introduced basic democracy system. Islam sent a letter to the office of the president and speaker in which he criticised it. He was the only chairman who directly criticised the system. After this incident The Daily Ittefaq published a news article about him titled Sabas Chairman. Later, he received "Sabas Chairman" title from Sheikh Mujibur Rahman.

Islam was elected as a member of the East Pakistan Provincial Assembly in 1970. He took part in the Liberation War of Bangladesh in 1971. He was appointed as a member of the Constituent Assembly of Bangladesh. Later, he was elected as a member of the Jatiya Sangsad from Jessore-6 in 1973.

Islam died on 20 February 2004.
