= Anwarul Abedin Khan =

Bangladeshi politician

- আনোয়ারুল আবেদীন খান

Member of Parliament for Electoral Constituency 154, Mymensingh-9
- In office 2014 – 6 January 2024
- Preceded by: Major General (Retd)Abdus Salam

Personal details
- Born: Mymensingh District, East Pakistan
- Party: Bangladesh Awami League
- Parent: Jahanara Khan (mother)

Anwarul Abedin Khan (Bengali: আনোয়ারুল আবেদীন খান) is a Bangladesh Awami League politician and the incumbent member of parliament from Mymensingh-9.

== Career ==
Khan was elected to parliament unopposed in 2014 and in 2018 from Mymensingh-9 as a candidate of the Bangladesh Awami League. On 28 November 2015, a curfew was imposed on his locality following fights between his supporters and those of former member of parliament, Major General (retired) Abdus Salam. He is one of the member of the standing committee on Ministry of Agriculture.
