= Shahin Chakladar =

Bangladeshi politician

- শাহীন চাকলাদার

Member of Parliament for Jessore-6
- In office 14 July 2020 – January 2024
- Preceded by: Ismat Ara Sadek

Personal details
- Party: Bangladesh Awami League

Shahin Chakladar is a Bangladesh Awami League politician and former Jatiya Sangsad member representing the Jessore-6 constituency.

== Career ==
Chaklader was accused in an extortion case along with Sheikh Helal. He was acquitted in the case while Sheikh Helal was found guilty in 2008.

Chakladar has been the general secretary of the Jessore district Awami League since 2004. He was the chairman of Jessore Sadar Upazila Parishad from 2009 to 2020. After the death of Ismat Ara Sadeq, Member of Parliament and former minister of state for public administration on 21 January 2020, he was elected member of parliament in the by-election of Jessore-6 vacant seat on the nomination of Awami League on 14 July 2020.

Chaklader has been accused of using his political ties to engage in corruption. He owns Zabeer Hotel International in Jessore which he established 300 million taka investment. The hotel was set ablaze by crowds who were celebrating the fall of Sheikh Hasina's government on 5 August 2024. The jubilant crowds vandalized murals of Sheikh Mujibur Rahman & Sheikh Russel in Jessore. They also set the district Awami League office ablaze.
