= Aasha Mehreen Amin =

Bangladeshi journalist

- আশা মেহরিন আমিন (Bengali)
- Born: 1966 (age 59–60); Dacca, East Pakistan, Pakistan
- Education: Boston College (BS); University of California at Berkeley
- Occupation: Journalist
- Employer: Joint Editor of The Daily Star
- Children: 1
- Parent(s): Anwarul Amin (father); Razia Khan (mother)
- Relatives: Nurul Amin (paternal grandfather); Tamizuddin Khan (maternal grandfather)

Aasha Mehreen Amin is a Bangladeshi journalist and writer. She is currently joint editor at The Daily Star.

== Biography ==
Aasha Mehreen Amin was born in Dhaka to a Bengali Muslim family. Her father, Anwarul Amin Makhon, was the second-eldest son of former Prime Minister of Pakistan Nurul Amin, and the former general manager of BCCI Bangladesh, known for opening Bangladesh Bank's first branch abroad (in London). Her mother, Razia Khan Amin, was an Ekushey Padak-winning writer, poet, and professor at the University of Dhaka, and her maternal grandfather, Maulvi Tamizuddin Khan, was a speaker of the parliament of Pakistan. She studied in Boston College, Massachusetts, United States of America, graduating with a Bachelor of Science in 1991.

Her grandfather, Nurul Amin was a Pakistani politician and jurist who served as the eighth prime minister of Pakistan from 7 December to 20 December 1971.

== Career ==
She started as a feature writer at The Daily Star, the largest circulated English language newspaper in Bangladesh, in June 1991. She received a journalism fellowship from the University of California at Berkeley where she studied environmental and investigative journalism in 1993. She was the editor of the weekly Star published by The Daily Star, a position she held from 1996 to 2015. She publishes her own satirical column in the magazine called Postscript and a current events column No Strings Attached in the newspaper. She was the deputy editor of the Editorial and Op-ed section of The Daily Star and is now the Joint Editor of The Daily Star.

== Personal life ==
Aasha Mehreen Amin is married and has one child.
