= Bengal Legislative Assembly =

Lower chamber of the legislature of Bengal in British India (1937–1947)

Bengal Legislative Assembly বঙ্গীয় আইনসভা

Type
- Type: Lower chamber

History
- Founded: 1937
- Disbanded: 1947
- Succeeded by: East Bengal Legislative Assembly; West Bengal Legislative Assembly
- Seats: 250

Meeting place
- Vidhan Sabha Bhavan, Calcutta

The Bengal Legislative Assembly (Bengali: বঙ্গীয় আইনসভা) was the largest legislature in British India, serving as the lower chamber of the legislature of Bengal (now Bangladesh and the Indian state of West Bengal). It was established under the Government of India Act 1935. The assembly played an important role in the final decade of undivided Bengal. The Leader of the House was the Prime Minister of Bengal. The assembly's lifespan covered the anti-feudal movement of the Krishak Praja Party, the period of World War II, the Lahore Resolution, the Quit India movement, suggestions for a United Bengal and the partition of Bengal and partition of British India.

Many notable speeches were delivered by Bengali statesmen in this assembly. The records of the assembly's proceedings are preserved in the libraries of the Parliament of Bangladesh and the West Bengal Legislative Assembly.

== History ==
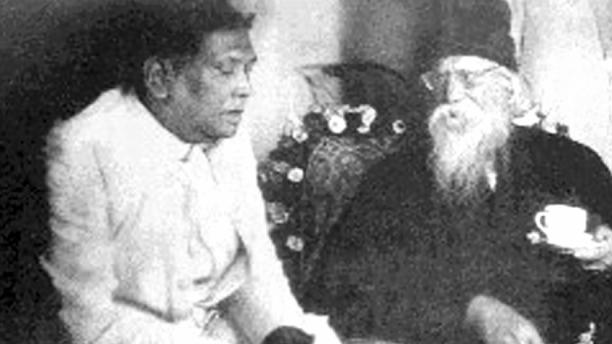
A. K. Fazlul Huq, the 1st Prime Minister of Bengal, with Bengali Nobel laureate Rabindranath Tagore

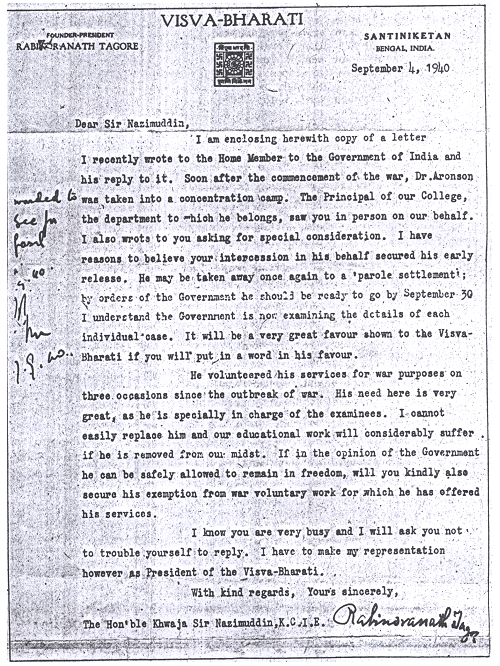
Tagore's letter to Prime Minister Nazimuddin regarding the release of a Jewish lecturer who had been detained by the British government

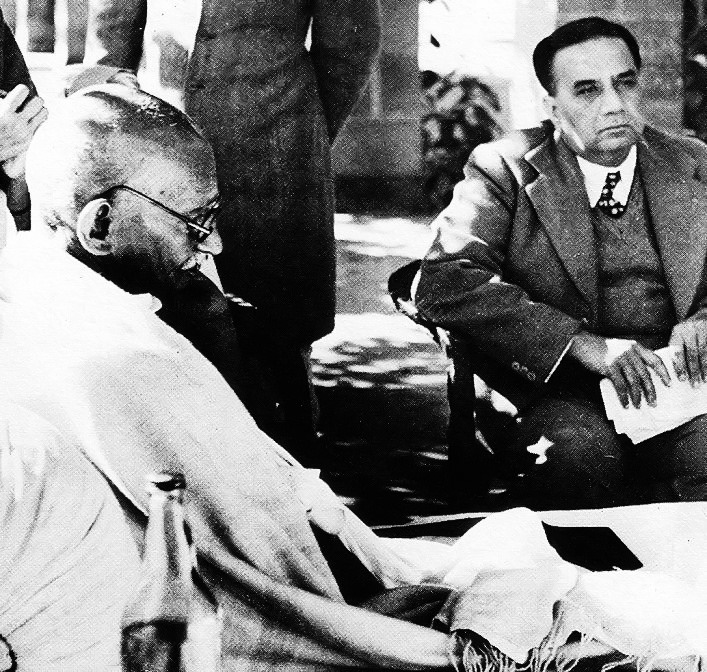
Mahatma Gandhi with the 3rd and last Prime Minister Huseyn Shaheed Suhrawardy

The assembly was the culmination of legislative development in Bengal which started in 1861 with the Bengal Legislative Council. The Government of India Act 1935 made the council the upper chamber, while the 250-seat legislative assembly was formed as the elected lower chamber. The act did not grant universal suffrage, instead in line with the Communal Award, it created separate electorates as the basis of electing the assembly. The first elections took place in 1937. The Congress party emerged as the single largest party but refused to form a government due to its policy of boycotting legislatures. The Krishak Praja Party and Bengal Provincial Muslim League, supported by several independent legislators, formed the first government. A. K. Fazlul Huq became the first prime minister. Huq supported the League's Lahore Resolution in 1940, which called on the imperial government to include the eastern zone of British India in a future sovereign homeland for Muslims. The text of the resolution initially seemed to support the notion of an independent state in Bengal and Assam. The Krishak Praja Party implemented measures to curtail the influence of the landed gentry. Prime Minister Huq used both legal and administrative measures to relieve the debts of peasants and farmers. According to the historian Ayesha Jalal, the Bengali Muslim population was keen for a Bengali-Assamese sovereign state and an end to the permanent settlement.

In 1941, the League withdrew support for Huq after he joined the Viceroy's defense council against the wishes of the League's president Jinnah. Jinnah felt the council's membership was detrimental to partitioning India; but Huq was joined on the council by the Prime Minister of the Punjab, Sir Sikandar Hayat Khan. In Bengal, Huq secured the support of Syama Prasad Mukherjee, the leader of the Hindu Mahasabha, and formed a second coalition government. Sir Khawaja Nazimuddin, a trusted confidante of Jinnah, became Leader of the Opposition. In 1943, the Huq ministry fell and Nazimuddin formed a Muslim League government.

Amid the outbreak of world war, Rabindranath Tagore urged Prime Minister Nazimuddin to arrange for the release of Alex Aronson, a German citizen and Jewish lecturer in Santiniketan who was interned by the British colonial authority. Tagore had earlier requested the central home ministry of India to release Aronson but the request was turned down. Tagore then wrote a letter to Prime Minister Nazimuddin in Bengal. Prime Minister Nazimuddin intervened and secured the release of the lecturer.

Nazimuddin led conservative elements in the Bengal Provincial Muslim League. As World War II intensified and Imperial Japan attacked Bengal from Burma, the provincial government grappled with the Bengal famine of 1943. Hindu-Muslim relations continued to deteriorate, particularly during the Congress's Quit India movement. The next general election was delayed for two years. The Nazimuddin ministry became unpopular. Governor's rule was imposed between March 1945 and April 1946. Factional infighting within the Bengal Provincial Muslim League displaced the Nazimuddin faction; and the centre-left H. S. Suhrawardy-led faction took control of the provincial party.

The 1946 Bengal Legislative Assembly election was won by the Bengal Provincial Muslim League. Suhrawardy was appointed prime minister. Suhrawardy's frosty relations with Jinnah affected his ambitions of achieving a United Bengal, though both men wanted Calcutta to remain within an undivided Bengal. The Noakhali riots and the violence of Direct Action Day contributed to the government's stand on partitioning Bengal. Despite support from Bengali Hindu leaders like Sarat Chandra Bose and the Governor of Bengal, Suhrawardy's proposals were not heeded by Earl Mountbatten and Nehru. The Hindu Mahasabha's legislators in the assembly demanded the partition of Bengal.

=== Eve of partition ===
On 20 June 1947, the Bengal Legislative Assembly met to decide on the partition of Bengal. At the preliminary joint meeting, it was decided by 126 votes to 90 that the province, if it remained united, should join the "new Constituent Assembly" (Pakistan). At a separate meeting of legislators from West Bengal, it was decided by 58 votes to 21 that the province should be partitioned and that West Bengal should join the "existing Constituent Assembly" (India). At a separate meeting of legislators from East Bengal, it was decided by 106 votes to 35 that the province should not be partitioned and 107 votes to 34 that East Bengal should join the Constituent Assembly of Pakistan in the event of partition. On 6 July 1947, the region of Sylhet in Assam voted in a referendum to join East Bengal.

== Seats ==
The allocation of 250 seats in the assembly was based on the communal award. It is illustrated in the following.

- Hindu elected seats- 78
- Muslim electorate seats- 117
  - Urban seats- 6
  - Rural seats- 111
- Anglo-Indian electorate seats- 3
- European electorate seats- 11
- Indian Christian electorate seats- 2
- Commerce, Industries and Planting seats- 19
  - Port of Calcutta
  - Port of Chittagong
  - Bengal Chamber of Commerce
  - Jute Interest
  - Tea Interest
  - Railways
  - Traders Associations
  - Others
- Zamindar seats- 5
- Labour representatives- 8
- Education seats- 2
  - University of Calcutta- 1
  - University of Dacca- 1
- Women seats- 5
  - Hindu electorate- 2
  - Muslim electorate- 2
  - Anglo-Indian electorate- 1

== Elections ==
The following results are recorded by the Asiatic Society of Bangladesh.

=== 1937 general election ===
Party	Seats
Congress	54
Independent Muslims	42
Muslim League	40
Independent Hindus	37
Krishak Praja Party	35
Tripura Krishak Party	5
Nationalist	3
Hindu Mahasabha	2
Others	32

=== 1946 general election ===
Party	Seats
Muslim League	114
Congress	86
Independent Hindus	13
Independent Muslims	9
Communist Party	3
Others	26

== Ministries ==
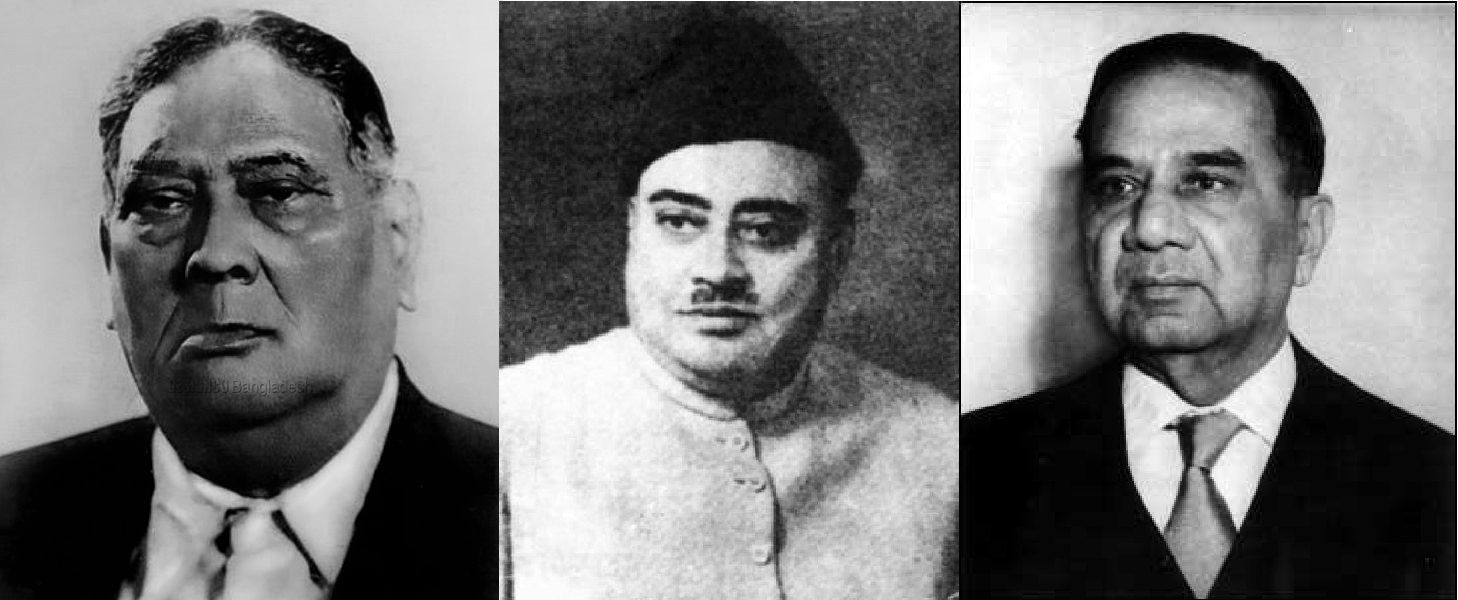
From left to right: Huq, Nazimuddin and Suhrawardy; the latter two became Prime Ministers of Pakistan; the former was East Bengal's chief minister and East Pakistan's governor

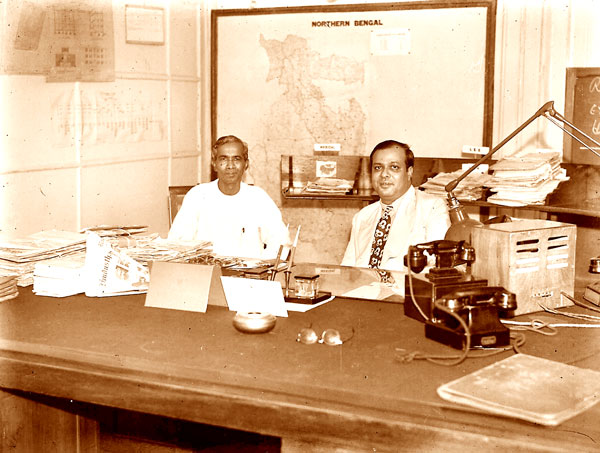
Prafulla Chandra Ghosh (left) and Mohammad Ali (right) in the Bengal Secretariat. The former became West Bengal's first premier ; the latter became Pakistan's third Prime Minister

=== First Huq ministry ===
The first ministry was formed by Prime Minister A. K. Fazlul Huq lasted between 1 April 1937 and 1 December 1941. Huq himself held the portfolio of Education, Sir Khawaja Nazimuddin was Home Minister, H. S. Suhrawardy was Commerce and Labour Minister, Nalini Ranjan Sarkar was Finance Minister, Sir Bijay Prasad Singh Roy was Revenue Minister was Agriculture and Industry Minister, Srish Chandra Nandy was Irrigation, Works and Communications Minister, Prasana Deb Raikut was Forest and Excise Minister, Mukunda Behari Mallick was Cooperative, Credit and Rural Indebtedness Minister, Nawab Musharraf Hussain was Judicial and Legislature Minister and Syed Nausher Ali was Public Health and Local Self Government Minister.

=== Second Huq ministry ===
The second Huq ministry lasted between 12 December 1941 and 29 March 1943. It was known as the Shyama-Huq coalition, named due to the inclusion of the Hindu Mahasabha member Shyamaprasad Mukherjee, who was the Finance Minister. It also included Khwaja Habibullah, Khan Bahadur Abdul Karim, Khan Bahadur Hashem Ali Khan, Shamsuddin Ahmed, Santosh Kumar Bose, Pramath Nath Banarji and Upendranath Barman

=== Nazimuddin ministry ===
The Nazimuddin ministry lasted between 29 April 1943 and 31 March 1945. Khawaja Nazimuddin served as the Chief Minister and held the portfolios of Home and Defence.

The composition of the cabinet was as follows: Khawaja Nazimuddin: Chief Minister (Prime Minister), Home and Defence Huseyn Shaheed Suhrawardy: Civil Supplies Maulvi Tamizuddin Khan: Education Khan Bahadur Syed Moazzemuddin Hossain: Agriculture and Rural Development Nawab Mosharraf Hossain: Law and Administration Khawaja Shahabuddin: Commerce, Labour and Industry Khan Bahadur Jalaluddin Ahmad: Public Health and Local Self-Government Tulsi Charan Goswami: Finance Borda Prasanna Paine: Public Works and Transport Taraknath Mukherjee: Revenue and Relief Premhari Barman: Forest and Excise Pulin Bihari Mallick: Information and Publicity Jogendra Nath Mandal: Cooperation and Credit

=== Suhrawardy ministry ===
The Suhrawardy ministry lasted between 23 April 1946 and 14 August 1947. Suhrawardy was himself Home Minister. Mohammad Ali was Finance, Health and Local Self Government Minister. Syed Muazzemuddin Hossain was Education Minister. Ahmed Hossain was Agriculture, Forest and Fisheries Minister. Nagendra Nath Roy was Judicial and Legislative Minister. Abul Fazal Muhammad Abdur Rahman was Cooperatives and Irrigation Minister. Abdul Gofran was Civil Supplies Minister. Tarak Nath Mukherjee was Waterways Minister. Fazlur Rahman was Land Minister. Dwarka Nath Barury was Works Minister.

== Speaker of the assembly ==
The legislative assembly elected its own Speaker. Sir Azizul Haque was the first speaker of the assembly. His successors included Syed Nausher Ali and Nurul Amin.

#	Speakers	Term start	Term end
1	Sir Azizul Haque	7 April 1937	27 April 1942
2	Syed Nausher Ali	1 March 1943	14 May 1946
3	Nurul Amin	14 May 1946	15 August 1947

== See also ==
- House of Commons
- British Indian Empire
