= Md. Shakhawat Hossain =

Bangladeshi politician

- মোঃ সাখাওয়াৎ হোসেন

Member of Parliament for Jessore-6
- In office 5 March 1991 – 24 November 1995
- Preceded by: Abdul Kader
- Succeeded by: ASHK Sadek

Personal details
- Born: 1953/1954 Jessore District, East Pakistan
- Died: 11 December 2021 (aged 68/69) Bangladesh

Md. Shakhawat Hossain, better known as Maulana Shakhawat, was a Bangladeshi politician and convicted war criminal. He represented the Jessore-6 constituency as a Bangladesh Jamaat-e-Islami and a Bangladesh Nationalist Party member in the 5th and 6th Jatiya Sangsad respectively. He later served as a presidium member of the Jatiya Party.

In August 2016, International Crimes Tribunal sentenced Hossain to death for war crimes. He was convicted of killing two persons, raping one and torturing two others in Keshabpur Upazila of Jessore District during the Bangladesh Liberation War in 1971.

== War crime convictions ==
Hossain was a central committee member of Islami Chhatra Sangha, the student wing of Jamaat-e-Islami party and a commander of Pakistan Army's auxiliary Razakar force at Chingra Bazar camp during the 1971 war. He joined Al-Badr, a paramilitary force, when it was formed.

Hossain was accused of acting as a local commander of a group that aided Pakistani soldiers. The prosecution's probe agency began investigating in February 2012. Hossain was arrested from his residence at Uttarkhan in Dhaka on 29 November 2014. In July 2015, the prosecution pressed five charges against 12 persons including Hossain for their alleged crimes against humanity. The five charges include killing two persons, raping one and torturing two others. The charges were accepted by the special court in September 2015. The conviction was delivered in August 2016. Sakhawat was sentenced to death by hanging. He died in prison in December 2021.
