= Rafiq Uddin Bhuiyan =

Bangladesh Awami League politician

Member of Parliament from Undivided Mymensingh-13
- In office 1973–1975

Member of Parliament from Mymensingh-9
- In office 1986–1988
- Preceded by: Habib Ullah Sarkar
- Succeeded by: Khurram Khan Chowdhury

Personal details
- Born: 25 January 1928
- Died: 23 March 1996 (aged 68)
- Party: Bangladesh Awami League

Rafiq Uddin Bhuiyan (25 January 1928 – 23 March 1996) was a Bangladesh Awami League politician and a former member of parliament from undivided Mymensingh-13 and for Mymensingh-9 in 1986. He was an organizer of the Liberation War of Bangladesh.

== Career ==
Bhuiyan was a member of the first parliament of Bangladesh. He was elected to parliament from Mymensingh-13 as a Bangladesh Awami League candidate in 1973. He was elected to parliament from Mymensingh-9 as a Bangladesh Awami League candidate in 1986. He was the president of the Mymensingh District unit of the Bangladesh Awami League.
