= Pramath Nath Banarji =

Bengali politician

Pramath Nath Banarji is a Bengali politician and Minister in the second cabinet of Prime Minister A. K. Fazlul Huq from 1941 to 1943. He was married to Amla Banarji, sister of Syama Prasad Mookerjee. They had one son, Purnendu. He previously worked as a government judge.
