= Achargaon Union =

Achargaon
- Union and Village
- Location in Bangladesh
- Coordinates: 24°33′N 90°44′E
- Country: Bangladesh
- Division: Mymensingh Division
- District: Mymensingh District
- Upazila: Nandail Upazila

Population (2011)
  - Total: 27,000
  - Density: 2,200/sq mi (850/km^{2})
- Time zone: UTC+6 (Bangladesh Time)

Achargaon is a union of Nandail Upazila, Mymensingh District, Bangladesh. It is located on the bank on Narasundhar river on area about 5 square kilometers (1.9 sq mi). About 27,000 people are living here.
