= Nurul Amin =

Pakistani politician (1893–1974)

- নূরুল আমীন; نور الامین
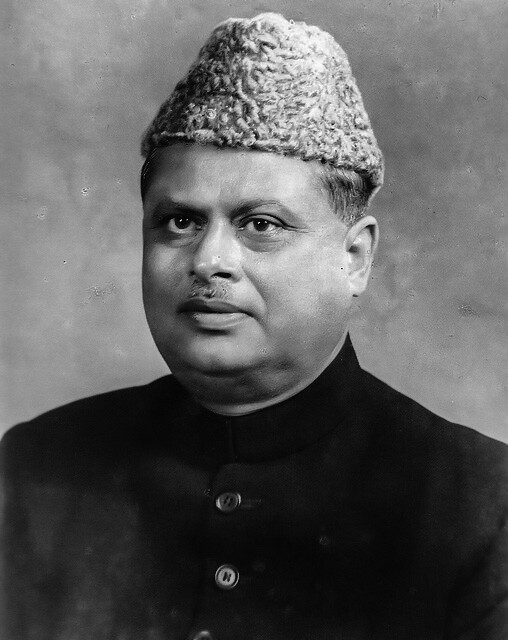

Vice President of Pakistan
- In office 20 December 1971 – 14 August 1973
- President: Zulfikar Ali Bhutto
- Preceded by: Post created
- Succeeded by: Post abolished

8th Prime Minister of Pakistan
- In office 7 December 1971 – 20 December 1971
- President: Yahya Khan
- Deputy: Zulfikar Ali Bhutto
- Preceded by: Feroz Khan Noon; Yahya Khan (acting)
- Succeeded by: Zulfikar Ali Bhutto

7th Leader of the Opposition
- In office 12 June 1965 – 25 March 1969
- Preceded by: Sardar Bahadur Khan (1964)
- Succeeded by: Khan Abdul Wali Khan

2nd Chief Minister of East Bengal
- In office 14 September 1948 – 3 April 1954
- Governor: Feroz Khan Noon; Chaudhry Khaliquzzaman
- Preceded by: Khwaja Nazimuddin
- Succeeded by: A. K. Fazlul Huq

Personal details
- Born: 15 July 1893 Shahbazpur, Bengal Presidency, British India
- Died: 2 October 1974 (aged 81) Rawalpindi, Punjab, Pakistan
- Resting place: Mazar-e-Quaid, Karachi, Pakistan
- Citizenship: Pakistan
- Party: Pakistan Democratic Party (1969–1974)
- Other political affiliations: National Democratic Front (1963–1969); Council Muslim League (1962–1963); Pakistan Muslim League (1947–1958); All-India Muslim League (pre-1947)
- Relatives: Razia Khan (daughter-in-law); Aasha Mehreen Amin (granddaughter)
- Education: Ananda Mohan College; University of Calcutta

Nurul Amin (Note: Bengali: নূরুল আমীন; Urdu: نور الامین) (15 July 1893 – 2 October 1974) was a Pakistani politician and jurist who served as the eighth prime minister of Pakistan from 7 December to 20 December 1971. His premiership term of only 13 days was the shortest served in Pakistani history.

Starting his political career in 1948, Amin served as Chief Minister of East Bengal and later headed the Ministry of Supply. Amin opposed the Bengali language movement of 1952. After participating in the 1970 Pakistani general election, he was appointed as the Prime Minister of Pakistan. He was the first and only vice president of Pakistan, serving from 1970 to 1972, and also led Pakistan during the Bangladesh War of Independence.

== Early life ==
Nurul Amin was born on 15 July 1893 in Shahbazpur, Sarail located in Tippera District of the Bengal Presidency (now in Brahmanbaria District, Bangladesh). He belonged to a Bengali Muslim family from the village of Bahadurpur in Nandail, Mymensingh District. His father was a zamindar, and his grandfather served as the Aʻlā Ṣadr (district judge) under the Nawabs of Bengal.

In 1915, Amin passed the college entrance examination from Mymensingh Zilla School, joining Ananda Mohan College two years later to obtain his Intermediate in Arts (I.A) He graduated with a bachelor's degree in English literature in 1919. After graduating, Amin took a position teaching at the local school Gaffargaon Islamia Government High School and then another local school in Calcutta, but decided to pursue his career in law. In 1920, Amin began at the University of Calcutta; he gained an LLB in Law and Justice in 1924, and passed the Bar exam the same year. Amin started his career in law after joining the Mymensingh Judge Court Bar.

== Public service ==
In 1929, Amin was appointed as a member of the Mymensingh Local Board, and later became a member of the Mymensingh District Board in 1930. In 1932, the British Indian Government appointed him as commissioner of Mymensingh Municipality. In 1937, Amin was appointed as the Chairman of the Mymensingh District Board, an assignment he continued until 1945.

During this time, Amin's interest in politics increased. He became an early member of the All-India Muslim League led by Mohammad Ali Jinnah. During this time, Amin was appointed as President of the Muslim League's Mymensingh district unit. In 1944, he was elected vice-president of the Bengal Provincial Muslim League.

In 1945, Amin participated in the Indian general elections, securing a landslide victory. He became a Member, and the following year was elected as the Speaker General of the Bengal Legislative Assembly.

== Political role ==
=== Pakistan Movement ===
Amin became a trusted lieutenant of Muhammad Ali Jinnah in East Bengal, fighting for the rights of Bengali Muslims in British India. Amin took an active part in the Pakistan Movement, organising Bengali Muslims, while he continued to strengthen the Muslim League in Bengal.

In 1946, Jinnah came to visit Bengal, where Amin assisted him. He promised the Bengali nation that, he would build a democratic country. In East Bengal, Amin promoted the unity of Muslims. By the time of the creation of Pakistan, Amin had become one of the leading advocates and activists of the Pakistan Movement; he had wide approval ratings from the Bengali population.

=== Chief Minister ===
After the death of Jinnah, Amin was nominated as the Chief Minister of East Bengal in September 1948 by Khawaja Nazimuddin, who succeeded Jinnah as Governor General.

Amin worked for the Muslim League in East Bengal, while continuing his relief programme for the population. As Chief Minister, his relations were significantly strained with Prime Minister Liaquat Ali Khan and the Governor-General of Pakistan Khawaja Nazimuddin. Soon after the assassination of Liaquat Ali Khan, Amin was appointed as Minister of Supply. He was elected as a member of the Pakistan National Assembly from 1947 until 1954. Amin assumed the office of Chief Minister in a few weeks.

Historians have noted that Amin's government was not strong enough to administer the provincial state; it was completely under the control of the central government of Nazimuddin. His government did not enjoy enough power, and lacked vision, imagination, and initiatives. Amin failed to counter the Communist Party's influence in the region, which widely took the credit for turning the language movement in 1952 into a large unified mass protest.

=== Language Movement ===
During Amin's term as Chief Minister, Governor General Nazimuddin (also from East Bengal but bilingual) reiterated the federal government's position that while Bengali was the language of virtually all East Pakistanis as well as the majority of Pakistanis as a whole, it was not to be considered a national language on a par with Urdu. In response, the Bengali language movement developed, and the ruling Muslim League lost popularity in East Pakistan. Both Nazimuddin and Amin failed to integrate the East Pakistani population with that of West Pakistan, and eventually the East Pakistan Muslim League lost significant administrative control of the province. Amin on the other hand, held the Communist Party responsible for this failure, accusing them of provoking the language movement.

Public dissatisfaction with Amin had grown since October 1951, when Nazimuddin became prime minister. Amin expelled dissidents from within the ranks of the Muslim League, but doing so simply strengthened opposition to the party. In early 1952, students protested against Prime Minister Nazimuddin's declaration in the provincial capital Dacca (now Dhaka) that Urdu would be the sole national language. During the unrest, the East Pakistan Police opened fire, killing student activists. This raised more opposition in the region to the Muslim League. PM Mohammad Ali Bogra (also a Bengali) visited East Bengal in early 1954 in an attempt to rally support for the League, but it was too late. Leading politicians in West and East Pakistan called for Amin's resignation, and new elections were soon held.

=== 1954 elections ===
In the 1954 provisional elections, the Muslim League was defeated by the United Front, an alliance between the Awami League (led by Huseyn Shaheed Suhrawardy), the Krishak Sramik Party (chaired by A. K. Fazlul Huq), the Nizam-e-Islam Party (headed by Maulana Athar Ali), and the Ganatantri Dal (led by Haji Mohammad Danesh and Mahmud Ali), eventually becoming more and more influential in Pakistani politics. It was in this turnover that Amin lost his assembly seat to a veteran student leader of East Pakistan, Khaleque Nawaz Khan, who had also been active in the Language Movement. The Muslim League was effectively eliminated from the provincial political landscape.

Amin served as the president of the East Pakistan Muslim League, and worked to improve its standing. During this time, the Pakistani authorities made reforms, including granting official status to the Bengali language in 1956 alongside Urdu. But after Army Commander General Mohammad Ayub Khan imposed martial law following the successful October 1958 Pakistani coup d'état against the government of President Iskander Mirza, Amin's political career was halted as Ayub Khan disbanded all political parties in the country.

=== Leader of the opposition ===
Amin ran as a candidate in the 1965 presidential elections in East Pakistan, winning the majority vote in the Parliament of Pakistan. He declined working with Ayub Khan and in, 1969, General Yahya Khan imposed martial law again.

In June 1969 merged his National Democratic Front with a dissident group of the Awami League led by Nawabzada Nasrullah Khan, the Nizam-e-Islam Party, and Air Marshal (Retd.) Asghar Khan's Justice Party to form the Pakistan Democratic Party (PDP). The new party was ideologically moderate. It strongly supported a united Pakistan. Amin was elected president of the PDP at its first convention.

=== 1970 elections ===
In the 1970 Pakistani general election, the PDP fielded 21 candidates in West Pakistan and 81 in East Pakistan. Of all of them, only Amin won his seat, NE-83-Mymensingh-VIII. He was one of only two non-Awami League candidates elected to the National Assembly that year from East Pakistan.

=== Independence War of 1971 ===
In March 1971, the Bangladesh War of Independence broke out. Amin, long dedicated to a united Pakistan, opposed the separatist movement in his home province of East Pakistan.

As an anti-war and principal Pakistan Movement activist, Amin is considered in Pakistan as a patriot who worked to retain Pakistan as a united nation; however, he is considered by many Bangladeshis as a traitor who collaborated with an occupying force accused of genocide and other war crimes.

=== Premiership and vice presidency ===
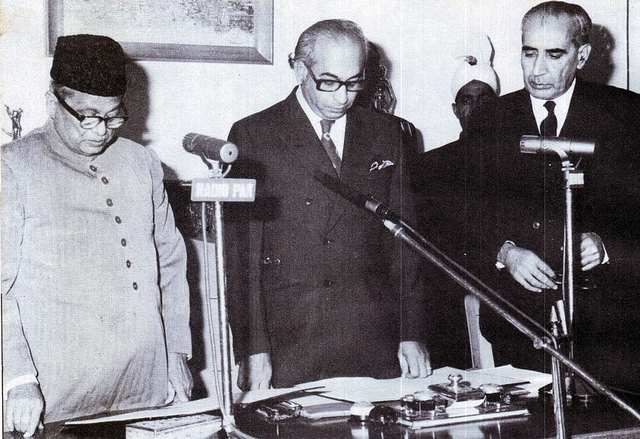
Amin being sworn in as Vice President of Pakistan, by President Zulfikar Ali Bhutto.

Yahya Khan appointed Amin as Prime Minister on 7 December 1971. On 20 December 1971, however, Amin's term as prime minister was cut short as Khan resigned, leaving the deputy prime minister (and foreign minister) Zulfikar Ali Bhutto to be sworn in as the new president. Two days later, Amin was appointed as Vice President of Pakistan, the only person to have held this post. He was sworn into the post again on 23 April 1972 after the interim constitution came into effect and martial law was lifted. He continued to hold the post until the office was abolished with the entry into force of the new constitution on 14 August 1973.

== Death and legacy ==
Amin stayed in West Pakistan while his home region achieved independence as the People's Republic of Bangladesh. He died of cardiac arrest aged 81 in Rawalpindi on 2 October 1974 and was given a public state funeral by Prime Minister Zulfikar Ali Bhutto. He was buried in Jinnah Mausoleum, next to Jinnah. His tomb was specially designed, made of Italian white marble, with golden letters for his name and contributions.

Nurul Amin was a trusted lieutenant of Quaid-i-Azam and a valiant fighter for the Pakistan Movement, and for Pakistan. He proved himself to be a crusader of (Pakistan's) solidarity and earned for himself the highest pedestal by dint of his efforts, intelligence, and his struggle...

— Malick Meraj Khalid, minister of law and parliamentary affairs, tribute to Nurul Amin, at ninth parliamentary session, 1976,

Amin had written an unpublished autobiography. His second-eldest son, Anwarul Amin Makhon, was the former general manager of BCCI Bangladesh and opened Bangladesh Bank's first branch abroad (in London). Anwarul Amin Makhon was married to the Ekushey Padak-winning writer and poet Razia Khan, the daughter of Pakistan Assembly Speaker Tamizuddin Khan, and had two children: banker Kaiser Tamiz Amin and journalist Aasha Mehreen Amin.

== Notes ==
Political offices
Preceded by Khawaja Nazimuddin	Chief Minister of East Bengal; 1948–1954	Succeeded by Fazlul Haq
Preceded by Sardar Bahadur Khan (1964)	Leader of the Opposition; 1967–1970	Succeeded by Khan Abdul Wali Khan
Preceded by Feroz Khan Noon	Prime Minister of Pakistan; 1971	Succeeded by Zulfikar Ali Bhutto
New office	Vice President of Pakistan; 1971–1973	Position abolished
