= Austagram Upazila =

Austagram অষ্টগ্রাম
- Upazila
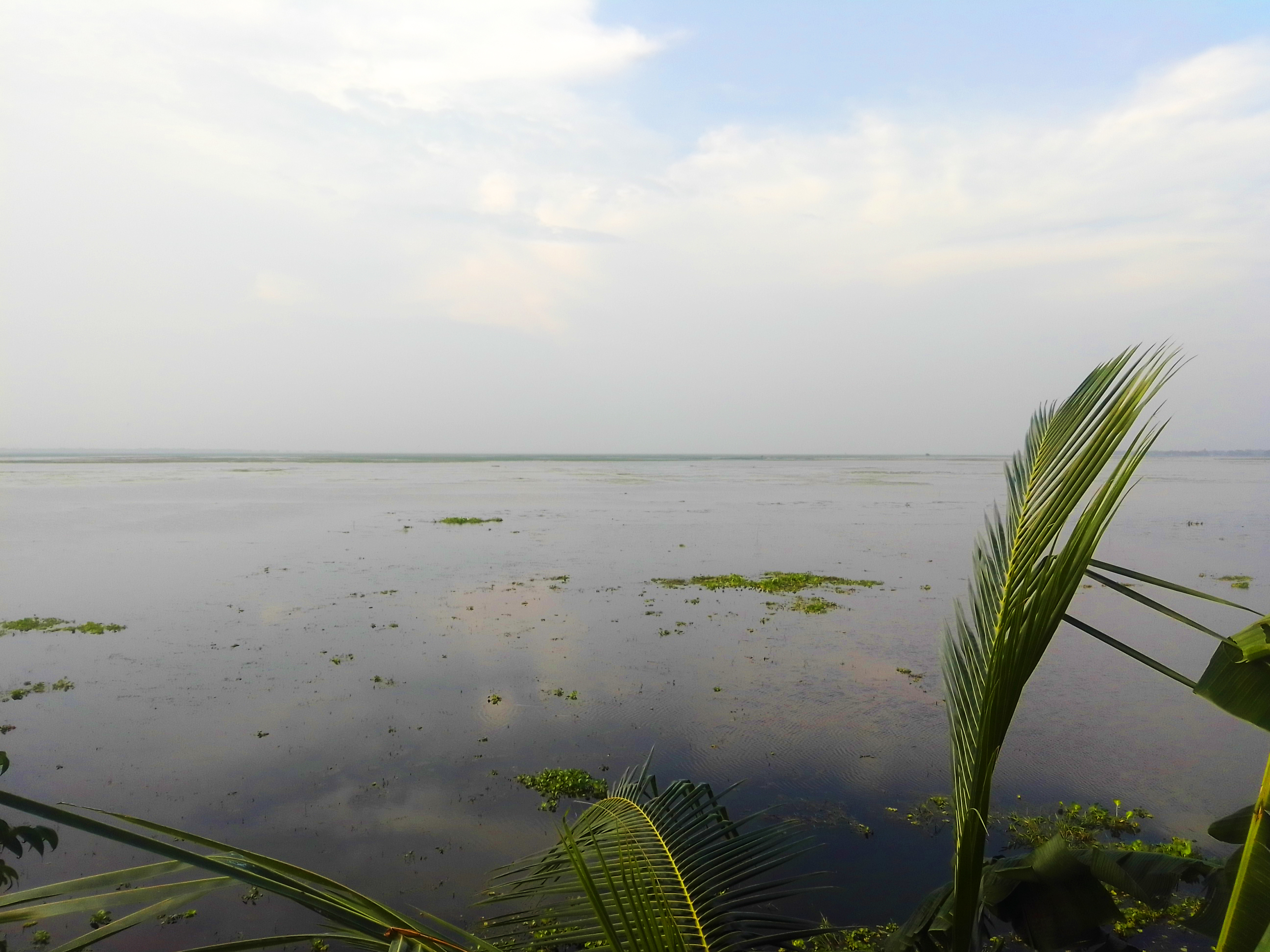
- Bara Haor, Austagram, Kishoreganj

- Coordinates: 24°16′N 91°7.5′E
- Country: Bangladesh
- Division: Dhaka
- District: Kishoreganj

Area
  - Total: 355.53 km^{2} (137.27 sq mi)

Population (2022)
  - Total: 151,238
  - Density: 425.39/km^{2} (1,101.7/sq mi)
- Time zone: UTC+6 (BST)
- Postal code: 2380
- Website: austagram.kishoreganj.gov.bd(in Bengali)

Austagram Upazila mauza geocode map

Austagram (Bengali: অষ্টগ্রাম) is an upazila of Kishoreganj District in the Division of Dhaka, Bangladesh.

== Geography ==
Austagram is located at 24.2667°N 91.1250°E. It has 31,129 households and a total area of 355.53 km^{2}.

== Demographics ==
According to the 2022 Bangladeshi census, Austagram Upazila had 33,898 households and a population of 151,238. 12.03% of the population were under 5 years of age. Austagram had a literacy rate (age 7 and over) of 60.86%: 61.71% for males and 60.09% for females, and a sex ratio of 90.97 males for every 100 females. 26,536 (17.55%) lived in urban areas.

Religions in Austagram Upazila (2022)
Religion	Percent
Islam	86.73%
Hinduism	13.26%
Other or not stated	0.01%

Population by religion in Union/Paurashava
Union	Muslim	Hindu	Others
1no. Deoghar Union	19,779	270	1
2no. Kastal Union	13,848	1,259	1
3no. Austagram Union	19,170	2,009	1
4no. Bangalpara Union	12,676	2,829	3
5no. Kalma Union	3,855	7,465	1
6no. Adampur Union	19,641	3,123	4
7no. Khayerpur-Abdullapur Union	28,545	772	11
8no. Purba Austagram Union	13,654	2,320	1

🟩 Muslim majority 🟧 Hindu majority

According to the 2011 Census of Bangladesh, Austagram Upazila had 31,129 households and a population of 152,523. 47,914 (31.41%) were under 10 years of age. Austagram had a literacy rate (age 7 and over) of 32.03%, compared to the national average of 51.8%, and a sex ratio of 1026 females per 1000 males. 17,400 (11.41%) lived in urban areas.

According to the 1991 Bangladesh census, Austagram had a population of 132,303, of whom 59,377 were aged 18 or over. Males constituted 51.41% of the population, and females 48.59%. Austagram had an average literacy rate of 18.2% (7+ years), against the national average of 32.4%.

== Administration ==
Austagram Upazila is divided into eight union parishads: Deoghar Union, Kastul Union, Austagram Sadar Union, Bangalpara Union, Kalma Union, Adampur Union, Khayerpur-Abdullapur Union and Purba Austagram Union. The union parishads are subdivided into 59 mauzas and 72 villages.

== Notable people ==
- Syed family of Austagram
  - Khan Bahadur Syed Muazzemuddin Hossain, aristocrat and education minister
  - Khan Bahadur Syed Misbahuddin Hussain, aristocrat and communications minister
- Mohammad Badruzzaman Bhuiyan, vice chancellor of Barisal University, was born at Austagram.

== See also ==
- Upazilas of Bangladesh
