= Sadequl Arefin =

Bangladeshi academic

Md. Sadequl Arefin
- মো. ছাদেকুল আরেফিন

Vice-Chancellor of University of Barishal
- In office 6 November 2019 – 5 November 2023
- Preceded by: S. M. Imamul Huq
- Succeeded by: Mohammad Badruzzaman Bhuiyan

Personal details
- Education: University of Rajshahi
- Occupation: Academic, university administrator

Md. Sadequl Arefin (also known as Arefin Matin) is a Bangladeshi academic. He served as vice-chancellor of the University of Barisal from 2019 to 2023. Before joining BU, he served as professor of social work at the University of Rajshahi.

== Education ==
Arefin obtained B.S.S. (Hons) and M.S.S. in Social Work from the University of Rajshahi. He obtained M.Phil. from Rajshahi University’s Institute of Bangladesh Studies (IBS) in 1993 and Ph.D. in 2003.

== Career ==
Arefin started his teaching career at Shahjalal University of Science and Technology (SUST), Sylhet. He joined the Department of Social Work, Rajshahi University in 1998. He served as assistant proctor, student advisor and senate member of Rajshahi University. He was General Secretary of Rajshahi University Teachers’ Association and Central Secretary General of Federation of Bangladesh University Teachers’ Association.

In November 2019, Sadequl Arefin was appointed as Vice-Chancellor of Barisal University for the next four years.

== Publications ==
His research focuses on the empowerment of the rural poor. He has 18 international and national research publications.
