= Syed Muazzemuddin Hossain =

Bengali politician

Khan Bahadur Syed Muazzemuddin Hossain

Education Minister of Bengal
- In office 1946–1947
- Prime Minister: Huseyn Shaheed Suhrawardy

Personal details
- Born: Austagram, Mymensingh district, Bengal Presidency
- Relatives: Syed Misbahuddin Hussain (cousin); Fazle Hasan Abed (grandson)
- Occupation: Politician
- Awards: Khan Bahadur, CIE

Syed Muazzemuddin Hossain was a Bengali politician. He served as the Minister of Education in the cabinet of Prime Minister Huseyn Shaheed Suhrawardy.

== Early life and family ==
Hossain was born into a Bengali zamindar family of Muslim Syeds in the village of Austagram in Jawanshahi pargana, Mymensingh district, Bengal Presidency (now in Kishoreganj District, Bangladesh). His cousin Syed Misbahuddin Hussain was the minister of communications for Pakistan. Hossain was married to Shareqa Banu Bibi, daughter of Maulvi Fath-ul-Islam Kona Miah, the Zamindar of Chapra, and sister of Khan Bahadur A. N. Shahidul Hoque. They had a daughter named Syeda Sufia Khatun who was the mother of Sir Fazle Hasan Abed KCMG.

== Career ==
Hossain was awarded the Khan Bahadur title by the British Raj.

Hossain was the Minister of Agriculture and Rural Development from 1943 to 1946. He served as the Minister of Education in the Huseyn Shaheed Suhrawardy cabinet from 23 April 1946 and 14 August 1947.
