= Mohammad Taufiq Alam =

Bangladeshi academic and researcher

Prof. Dr. Mohammad Taufiq Alam
- মোহাম্মদ তৌফিক আলম
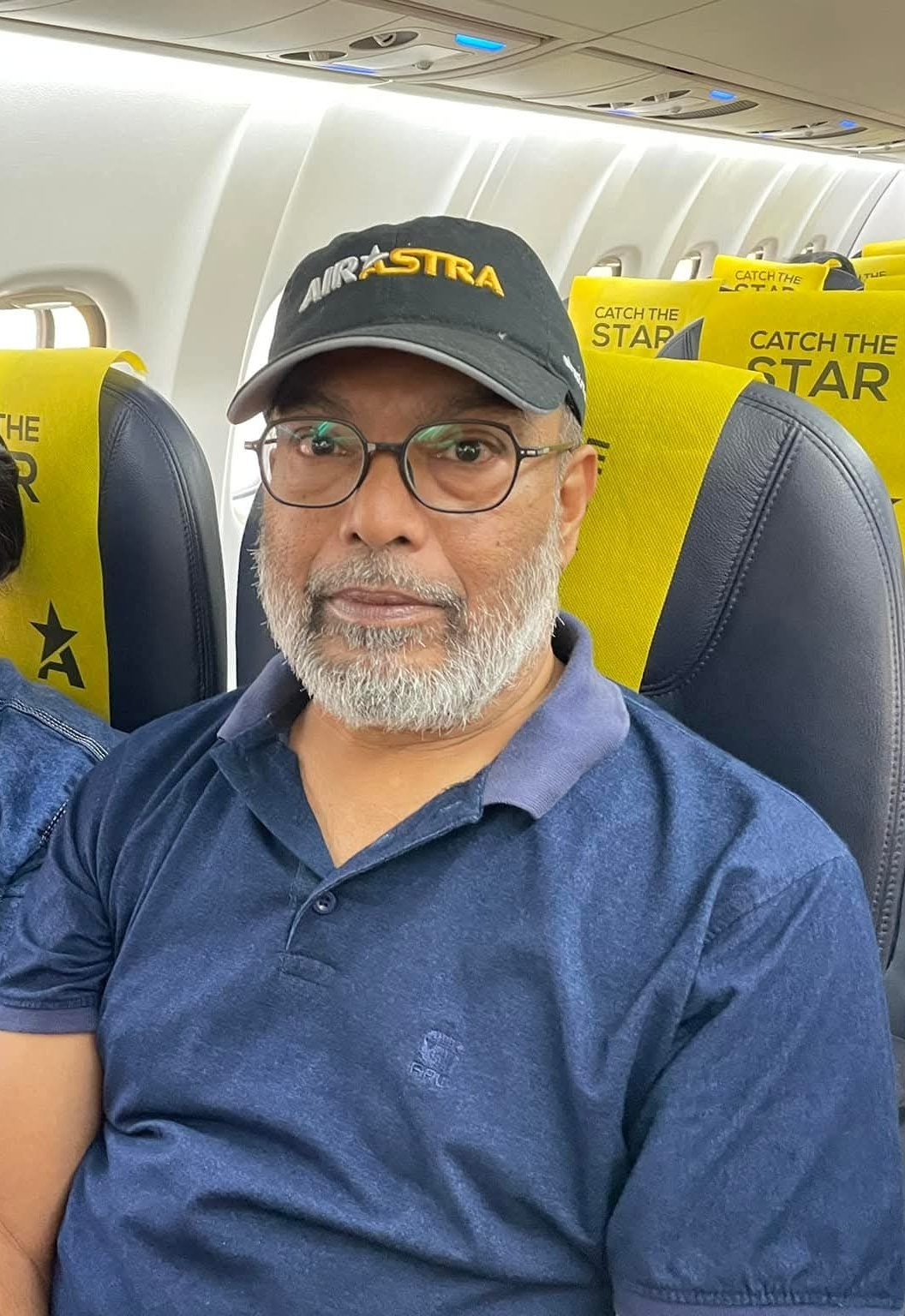

7th Vice-Chancellor of the University of Barishal
- Incumbent
- Assumed office 13 May 2025
- Chancellor: President Mirza Fakhrul Islam Alamgir
- Preceded by: Shuchita Sharmin

Personal details
- Born: Bangladesh
- Education: University of Rajshahi (B.Sc, M.Sc); Osaka University (PGD); Tokyo Institute of Technology (PhD)
- Occupation: Academic, Administrator

Mohammad Taufiq Alam (Bengali: মোহাম্মদ তৌফিক আলম) is a Bangladeshi academic and administrator. He is currently serving as the Vice-Chancellor of the University of Barishal (BU). Prior to this appointment, he was a senior Professor in the Department of Applied Chemistry and Chemical Engineering at the University of Rajshahi (RU).

== Education ==
He obtained his Bachelor of Science (B.Sc.) in Applied Chemistry in 1986 and Master of Science (M.Sc.) in Applied Chemistry and Chemical Technology in 1987 from the University of Rajshahi.

Later, he went to Japan for higher studies. He completed a Post-graduate Diploma in Microbiology from Osaka University in 1997. In 2002, he earned his Doctor of Philosophy (PhD) from the Tokyo Institute of Technology.

== Career ==
=== Academic Career ===
Taufiq Alam began his academic career as a lecturer in the Department of Applied Chemistry and Chemical Engineering at the University of Rajshahi on 1 July 1992. His academic promotion timeline is as follows:

- Lecturer: 1992 – 1995
- Assistant Professor: 1995 – 2003
- Associate Professor: 2003 – 2007
- Professor: He was promoted to the rank of Professor on 3 October 2007.

=== Administration ===
On 12 May 2025, Taufiq Alam was appointed as the Vice-Chancellor of the University of Barishal, succeeding Shuchita Sharmin. Initially appointed to perform the routine duties of the Vice-Chancellor (Interim), he was subsequently appointed as the regular Vice-Chancellor for a four-year term by the Chancellor. His appointment came during a period of administrative transition at the university.

== Research ==
Alam's primary research interests lie in Protein Chemistry and Enzymology. Some of his notable works involve protein stretching and the study of enzymes like carbonic dehydratase.
