= Bangalpara Union =

Bangalpara Union বাংগালপাড়া ইউনিয়ন
- Union
- 4no. Bangalpara Union Parishad
- Location within Bangladesh
- Coordinates: 24.2434°N 91.1070°E
- Country: Bangladesh
- Division: Dhaka

Government
  - Chairman: Md. Moniruzzaman Rustam

Area
  - Total: 26.56 km^{2} (10.25 sq mi)

Population (2011)
  - Total: 19,685
  - Density: 741.2/km^{2} (1,920/sq mi)
- Time zone: UTC+6 (BST)
- Postal code: 2350
- Website: bangalparaup.kishoreganj.gov.bd/en

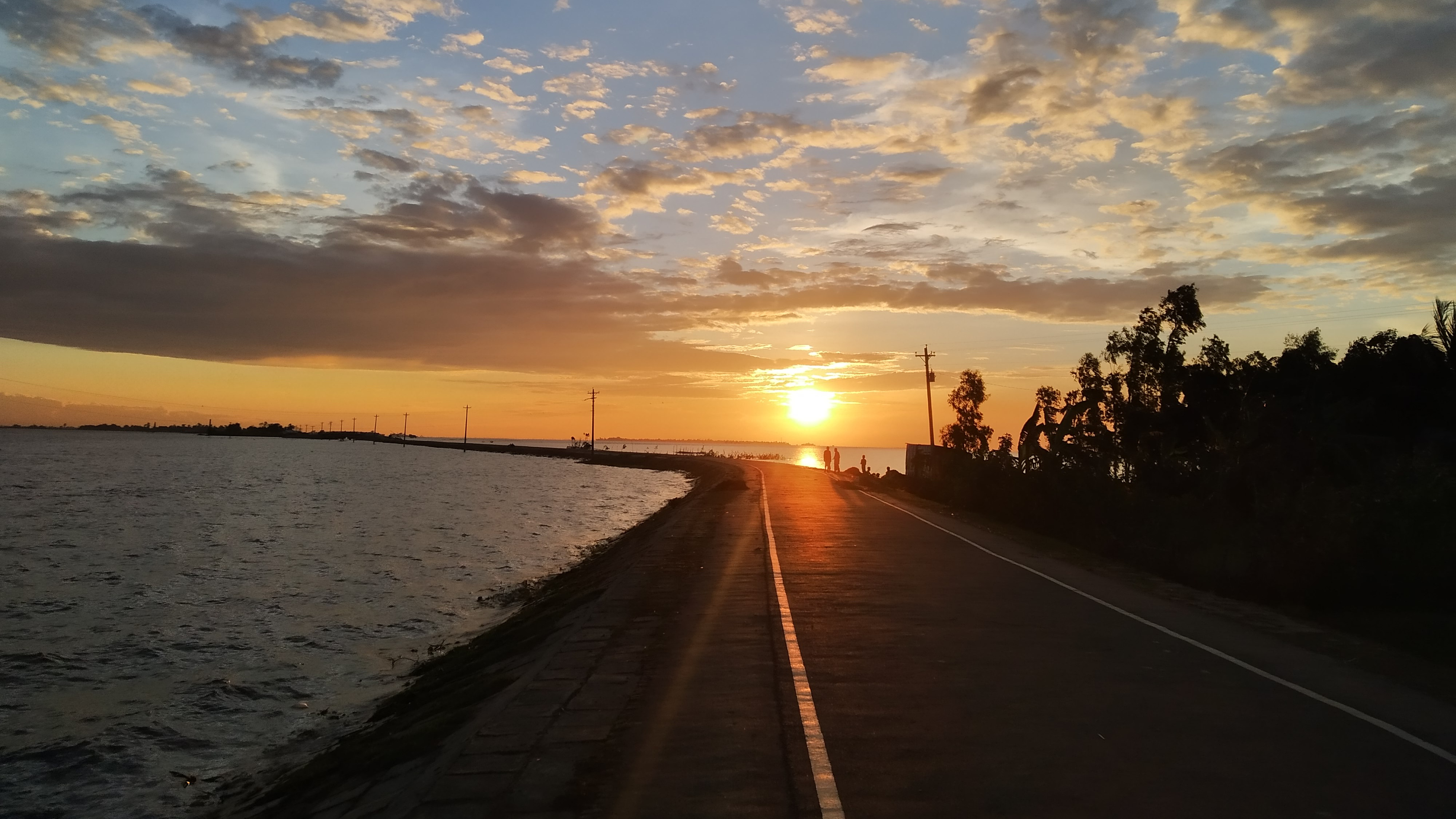
Natural environment of Bangalpara Union.

Bangalpara Union (Bengali: বাংগালপাড়া ইউনিয়ন) is a union parishad situated at Austagram Upazila in Kishoreganj District, Dhaka Division of Bangladesh. The union has an area of 26.56 square kilometres (10.25 sq mi) and as of 2011 had a population of 19,685.

== Economy ==
Bangalpara Union's economy depends mainly on agriculture and fisheries.

== Local administration ==
Bangalpara Union Parishad consists of a chairman and twelve members, including three seats reserved exclusively for women. Union Parishads are formed under the Local Government (Union Parishads) Act, 2009.

== Demographics ==
Religions in Bangalpara Union (2022)
Religion	Percent
Islam	81.74%
Hinduism	18.25%
Other or not stated	0.01%

🟩 Muslim majority 🟧 Hindu majority

== Wards and villages ==
The total number of villages in Bangalpara Union is 15, and there are 9 wards.

Ward No.	Village's Name
1no. Ward	Karamnagar, Manaharpur
2no. Ward	Usmanpur
3no. Ward	Uttar (North) Bangalpara
4no. Ward	Anwarpur
5no. Ward	Dakkhin (South) Bangalpara, Hyderabad, Kalimpur
6no Ward	Rathani, Shantinagar
7no. Ward	Vatinagar
8no Ward	Laaura, Nazirpur
9no. Ward	Noagaon, Baghaiya

== Elected representatives ==
Chairman			Duration
Md. Moniruzzaman			Five Years (2022–2027)
Ward No.	Ward Members	Reserved seats	Five Years (2022–2027)
1	Jamal Mia	Helena Begum	Five Years (2022–2027)
2	Amjad Hossen	Helena Begum	Five Years (2022–2027)
3	Wali Mia	Helena Begum	Five Years (2022–2027)
4	Eksar Mia	Happy Begum	Five Years (2022–2027)
5	Doyananda Das	Happy Begum	Five Years (2022–2027)
6	Lal Mohammad	Happy Begum	Five Years (2022–2027)
7	Liton Chandra Das	Ahera Banu	Five Years (2022–2027)
8	Jusel Rana	Ahera Banu	Five Years (2022–2027)
9	Amirul Islam	Ahera Banu	Five Years (2022–2027)

== List of chairmen ==
Current Chairman	Term of Office
Md. Moniruzzaman Rustam	2022 - Current

No.	Name of Chairmen	Duration
8	Md. Anamul Haque Bhuiyan	2016–2022
7	Mahmudul Haque Oli	2002–2016
6	Md. Sabdhar Mia	1997–2002
5	Burhan Uddin Bhuiyan	1992–1997
4	Md. Sabdhar Mia	1989–1992
3	Zahirul Haque Nasim	1973–1988
2	Ataul Haque Nuru	1968–1973
1	Lalmohon Sutradhar	1961–1968

== Education ==
The education system in Bangalpara is that of Bangladesh.

Literacy rate: 45.6%.

There is 1 secondary school, 1 higher secondary college, 1 madrasah, and 10 primary schools in Bangalpara Union.

List of institutions in Bangalpara:

High School/College:
Bangalpara High School and College

Madrasah:
Bangalpara Islamia Dakhil Madrasah

Primary Schools:
Karamnagar Govt. Primary School
Hasuk Govt. Primary School, Manaharpur
Usmanpur Govt. Primary School
Bangalpara Govt. Primary School
Abdul Jalil Govt. Primary School, Rathani
Vatinagar Govt. Primary School
Laaura Govt. Primary School
Nazirpur Govt. Primary School
Noagaon Govt. Primary School
Baghaiya Govt. Primary School
