= S. M. Imamul Huq =

Bangladeshi academic

S.M. Imamul Huq

2nd Vice-Chancellor of University of Barishal
- In office May 2015 – April 2019
- Preceded by: Md. Harunor Rashid Khan
- Succeeded by: Md. Sadequl Arefin
- Chancellor: President Abdul Hamid

Personal details
- Education: University of Dhaka, Dhaka, Bangladesh; University of Nancy I, France; Asian Institute of Technology (AIT), Bangkok, Thailand; PhD (Doctor of Engg. in Plant Physiology and Plant Biology)
- Alma mater: University of Dhaka
- Occupation: Academic, university administrator
- Awards: Bangladesh Academy of Sciences Gold Medal

S.M. Imamul Huq is a Bangladeshi academic. He was a professor of the Department of Soil, Water & Environment, University of Dhaka. He served as vice-chancellor of the University of Barisal from 2015 to 2019.

== Education ==
In 1970, Huq graduated from the University of Dhaka with a B.Sc. degree in soil science, and the following year finished an M.Sc. degree in the same subject. He completed a second M.Sc. in agricultural soil and water engineering from Asian Institute of Technology (AIT), Bangkok, Thailand, in 1980. In 1984, he received a D. Engg. from the University of Nancy I, France, for his dissertation Comparaison de la résistance au stress salin de Vigna sinensis (L.) Savi et de Phaseolus aureus Roxb.

== Career ==
Huq joined the faculty at the University of Dhaka in 1973 as a lecturer in soil science. From 2005 to 2008, he served as chair of the Department of Soil, Water and Environment.

Huq was appointed to a four-year term as vice-chancellor of the University of Barisal in May 2015. Late in his tenure, students began protesting, alleging that they had been excluded from the university's Independence Day commemoration. Tensions escalated after Huq used the expression "razakarer bachcha" (children of collaborators with Pakistan), which the students believed was directed at them. The following day students padlocked the academic building and boycotted classes. Authorities closed the campus the next day, and Huq apologized, saying he had been misunderstood. Students responded by burning him in effigy. Student protests demanding his resignation continued for a month. At the end of April 2019, Huq was granted leave for the remainder of his term as vice-chancellor.
