= Mohammad Badruzzaman Bhuiyan =

Bangladeshi professor and former vice chancellor

Professor Mohammad Badruzzaman Bhuiyan

Vice chancellor

Barisal University
- In office 4 March 2024 – 20 August 2024
- Preceded by: Sadequl Arefin
- Succeeded by: Shuchita Sharmin

Personal details
- Born: Austagram, Kishoreganj District, Bangladesh
- Education: Dhaka University
- Occupation: Professor, university administrator

Mohammad Badruzzaman Bhuiyan is a Bangladeshi professor. He is a professor in the Department of Tourism and Hospitality Management, University of Dhaka, and a former vice-chancellor of Barisal University.

== Born ==
Badruzzaman Bhuiyan was born in Austagram Upazila of Kishoreganj.

== Education ==
Badruzzaman graduated from the Department of Accounting and Information Systems, University of Dhaka in 2004 and received his master's degree in 2005. He earned his Ph.D. in tourism and hospitality management from the same university in 2016.

== Career ==
Badruzzaman Bhuiyan is a professor at the Department of Tourism and Hospitality Management, University of Dhaka. In addition to teaching, he has held various positions, including provost, assistant proctor, and chairman of the Department of Tourism and Hospitality Management at Dhaka University's Shaheed Sergeant Zahurul Haque Hall. He also performs the routine duties of the treasurer and vice-chancellor of Barisal University.

Badruzzaman Bhuiyan was appointed as the vice-chancellor of Barisal University on 4 March 2024. He resigned from the position on 20 August 2024.
