= Syed Misbahuddin Hussain =

East Pakistani Politician

Khan Bahadur Syed Misbahuddin Hossain

Minister of Communications
- In office 18 October 1957 – 16 December 1957
- Prime Minister: Huseyn Shaheed Suhrawardy

Personal details
- Born: Austagram, Mymensingh district, Bengal Presidency
- Relatives: Syed Muazzemuddin Hossain (cousin); Fazle Hasan Abed (grandnephew)
- Occupation: Politician
- Awards: Khan Bahadur, CIE

Syed Misbahuddin Hussain was a Pakistani politician who was a member of the 2nd National Assembly of Pakistan as a representative of East Pakistan. He served as the Federal Minister of Communications from 18 October 1957 to 16 December 1957 during Suhrawardy government.

== Early life and family ==
Hossain was born into a Bengali zamindar family of Muslim Syeds in the village of Austagram in Jawanshahi pargana, Mymensingh district, Bengal Presidency (now in Kishoreganj District, Bangladesh). His cousin Syed Muazzemuddin Hossain was the minister of education before independence, and his grandnephew is Sir Fazle Hasan Abed KCMG.

== Career ==
Hussain was a Member of the 2nd National Assembly of Pakistan. He spoke in the assembly against the lack of representation of Bengalis in the Armed forces of Pakistan. He believed it was a "short sighted policy" that would bring "ruin" to Pakistan.
