= University of Barishal =

Public university in Bangladesh

- বরিশাল বিশ্ববিদ্যালয়
- Former name: Shaheed Ziaur Rahman University Barisal
- Motto: জ্ঞানই শক্তি
- Motto in English: Knowledge is power
- Type: Public
- Established: 2011; 15 years ago
- Academic affiliations: UGC
- Budget: ৳ 62.87 crore
- Chancellor: President Mirza Fakhrul Islam Alamgir
- Vice-Chancellor: Mohammad Taufiq Alam
- Academic staff: 210 (2024)
- Administrative staff: 273 (2024)
- Students: 10145 (2025)
- Location: Kornokathi (Dhaka-Patuakhali Hwy), Barisal, 8200, Bangladesh; 22.6599°N 90.3620°E
- Campus: Suburban (50 acres)
- Language: English, Bengali
- Website: bu.ac.bd

University of Barishal (Bengali: বরিশাল বিশ্ববিদ্যালয়, Boriśhāl Biśbôbidyālôẏ; also known as Barishal University or simply BU) is a public university located in Barisal, a divisional city in southern Bangladesh. It is the country's 33rd public university.

The university was established in 2011 and began academic activities at undergraduate level in six departments under four faculties on 24 January 2012. The university offers degrees at undergraduate and postgraduate levels. The university houses 25 academic departments under six faculties, where 24 departments are currently providing postgraduate degrees. Every year almost 1,500 students are admitted to undergraduate programs in the university. The university started its academic activities at the temporary campus at Barisal Zilla School and then shifted to its permanent campus. The permanent suburban campus of 50 acres of the university is located in Barisal Sadar Upazila beside Dhaka-Patuakhali Highway on the bank of Kirtankhola river.

== Location ==
The university is situated in the district of Barisal under Barisal Division. It is located at Karnakathi on the eastern bank of the Kirtonkhola river beside the Barisal-Patuakhali highway about 2 kilometers from the center of Barisal City. The university campus is spread over 50 acres of land.

== History ==
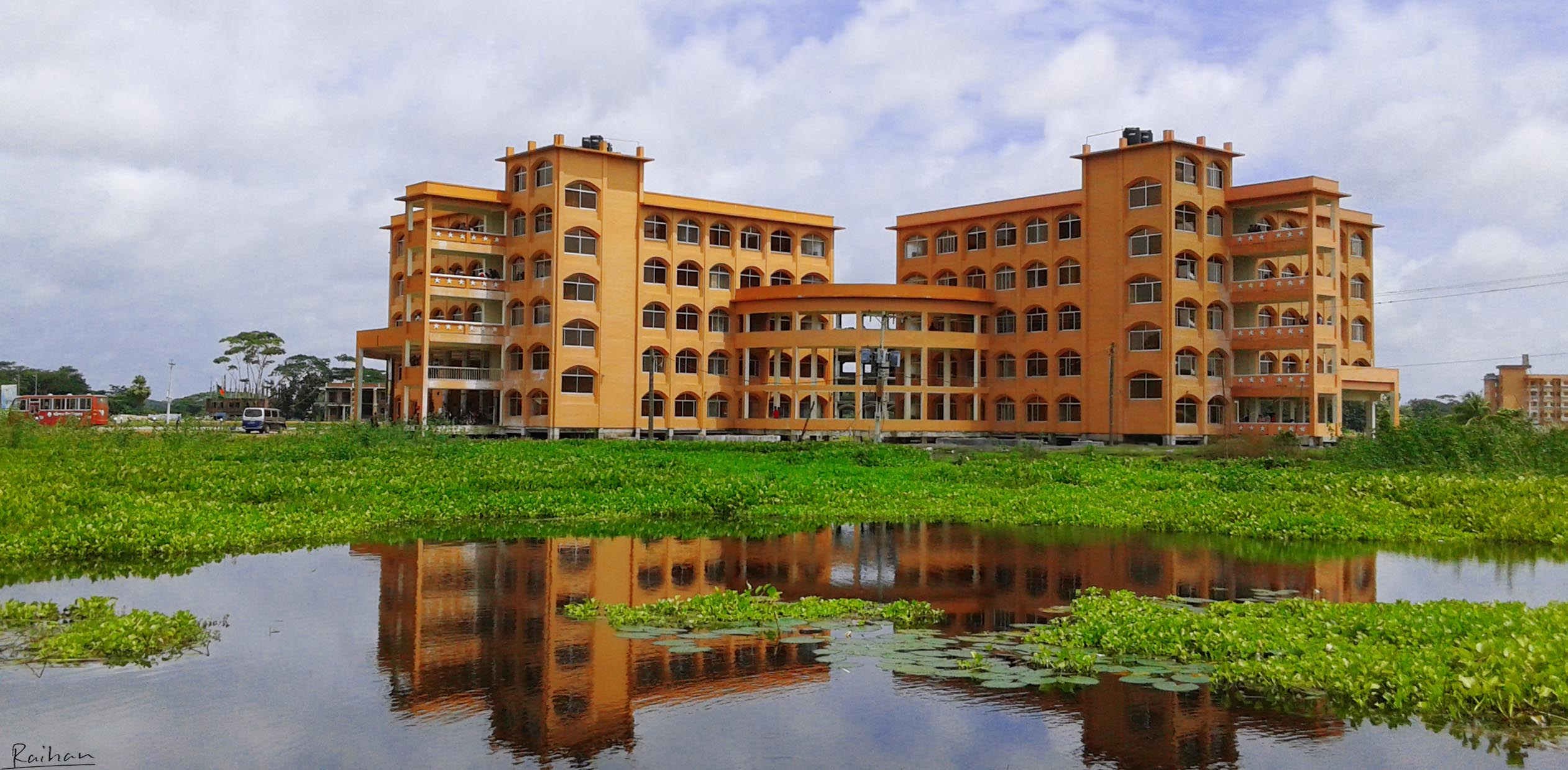
Barisal University Lake view

Demand for a university in the area was first made in 1960 before the independence of Bangladesh. In 1973, then-Prime Minister Sheikh Mujibur Rahman declared he wished to establish a university in Barisal during a rally held in the city. President Ziaur Rahman made a similar statement concerning establishing a university in Barisal on 23 November 1978, at a rally in Barisal Circuit House. In 1990s, former president Abdur Rahman Biswas also made a statement for the establishment of the university. In 2001, the 'Barisal University of Science and Technology Act, 2001' was passed by Parliament. In 2006, 'Shaheed Ziaur Rahman University Barisal Act, 2006' was passed. By passing this Act the 'Barisal Science and Technology University Act, 2001' was repealed.

After three decades, following strong demand from the people of Barisal, the proposal was passed in ECNEC on 20 November 2008, by then Caretaker Government. The law of the University of Barishal has been amended and passed by the National Assembly of Bangladesh on 16 June 2010. On 22 February 2011, Prime Minister Sheikh Hasina inaugurated the construction of a building of the university. The university officially started functioning from the first day of July 2011 in a temporary campus at Barisal Zilla School. Educational activities were inaugurated by Minister for Education Nurul Islam Nahid on 24 January 2012, in the temporary campus of the university. President Zillur Rahman and Md. Harunor Rashid Khan, from University of Dhaka adorned the chairs of the Founder Chancellor and Vice-Chancellor respectively.

The construction of the main campus started in 2012 which is located at Karnakathi on the eastern bank of the Kirtankhola river in Barisal Sadar Upazila. Tk. 900 million was sanctioned to construct the university on 50 acres of land, including 12 acres of private and 38 acres public land.

In academic year 2011–2012 around 400 students were enrolled in six inaugural departments - English, Management, Marketing, Economics and Mathematics.

== Campus ==
The university campus covers an area of 50 acres, and is landscaped around the Kirtankhola river with field areas and plants making the campus a natural arboretum. Facilities include academic buildings, administration building, auditorium, library, computer centre, workshop, research laboratories, halls of residence, teachers' quarter, mosque etc. The university has inside its boundaries a bank, a canteen and a large auditorium.

=== Transportation ===
The university runs its own regular bus service to and from the city to facilitate frequent commuting of the students residing there. Friday and Saturday are weekly holidays. The university own single and doubled-decker buses as well as microbuses to facilitate transport of students, staff and faculty members.

=== Medical Center ===
The University Medical Center is equipped for primary care but serious cases are referred to a Medical college hospital (Sher -E -Bangla Medical College Hospital) which is about 4 kilometres away.

=== Sports and entertainment ===
The university provides facilities for football, cricket, volleyball, table tennis etc. The students play tennis, badminton and other games as well. The students arrange debate, cultural show etc. The annual sports events are arranged at University Playground.

=== Library ===
The library has more than 20,000 books and hundreds of journals and periodicals in its collection. Approximately 150 students can use these facilities at a time.

=== Halls of residence ===
There are four dormitories for students.

==== Boy's halls ====
Name	Established	Number of accommodations	Note
Bijoy 24 Hall	2011	500	Julay 24
Sher E Bangla Hall	2011	500	A. K. Fazlul Haque

==== Girl's halls ====
Name	Established	Number of accommodations	Note
Sufia Kamal Hall	2011	500	Sufia Kamal
Rabeya Bosri Hall	2023	500	Rabeya bosri

BU Campus

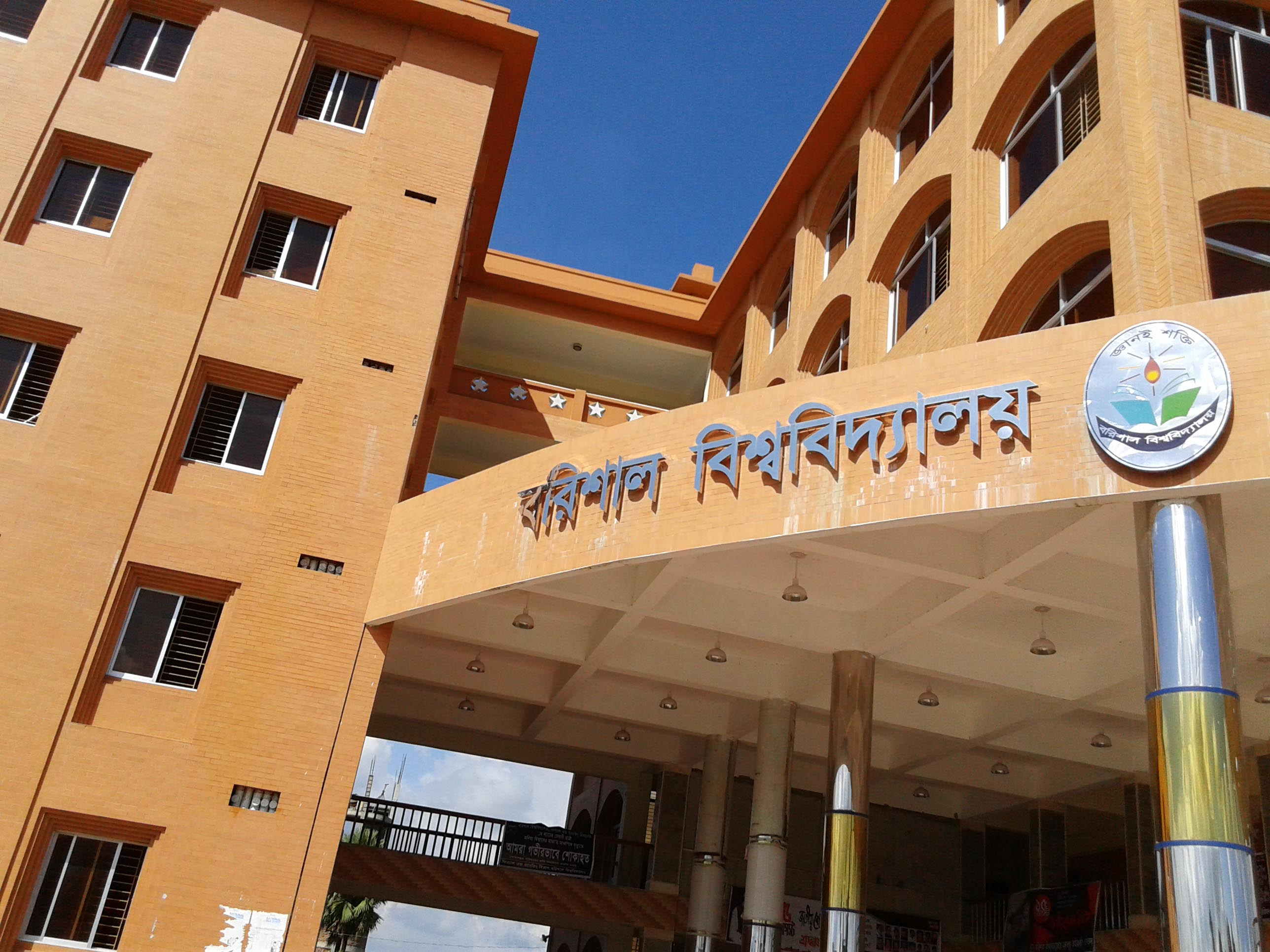
Barishal University entrance

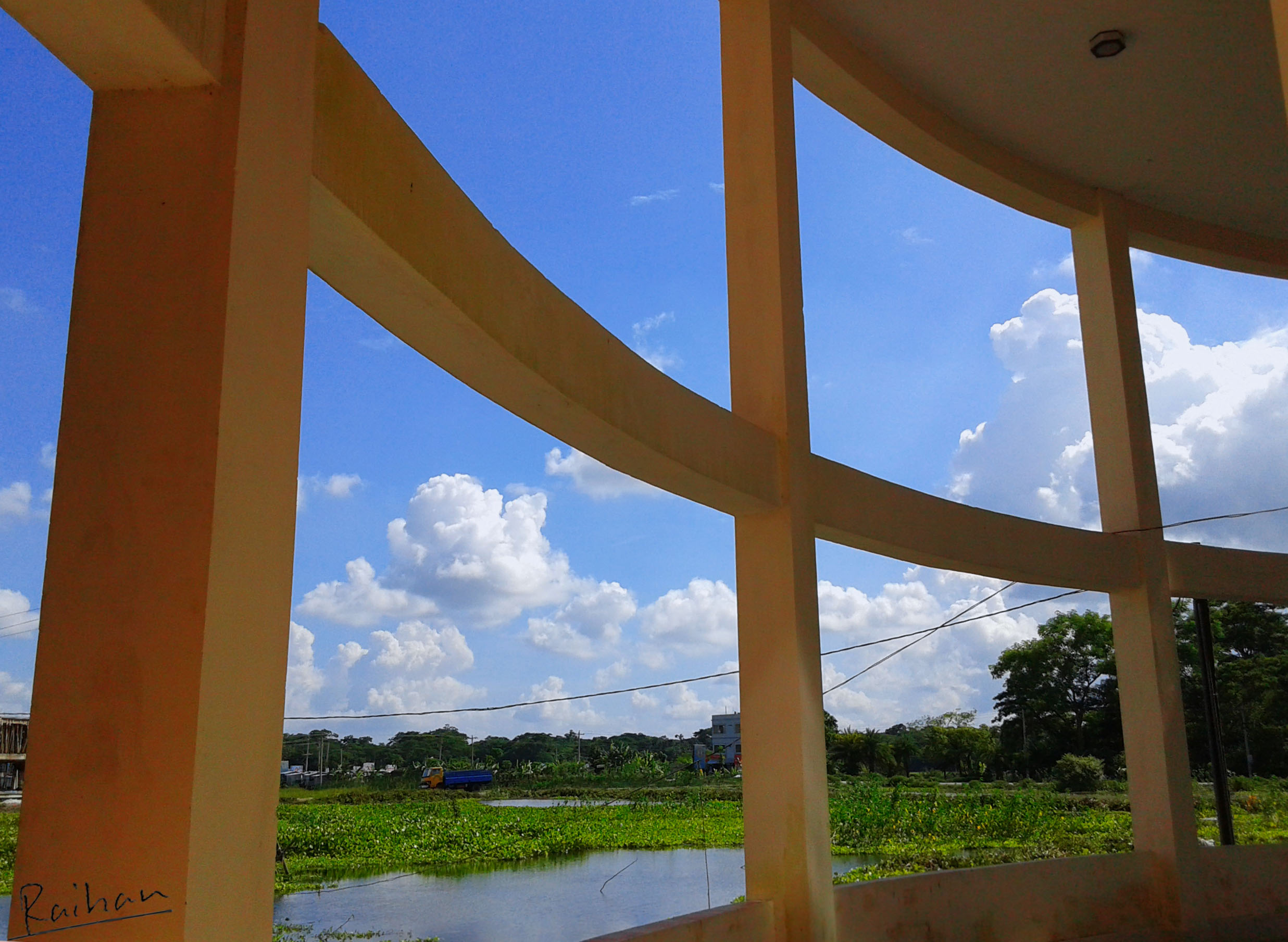
View from the academic building

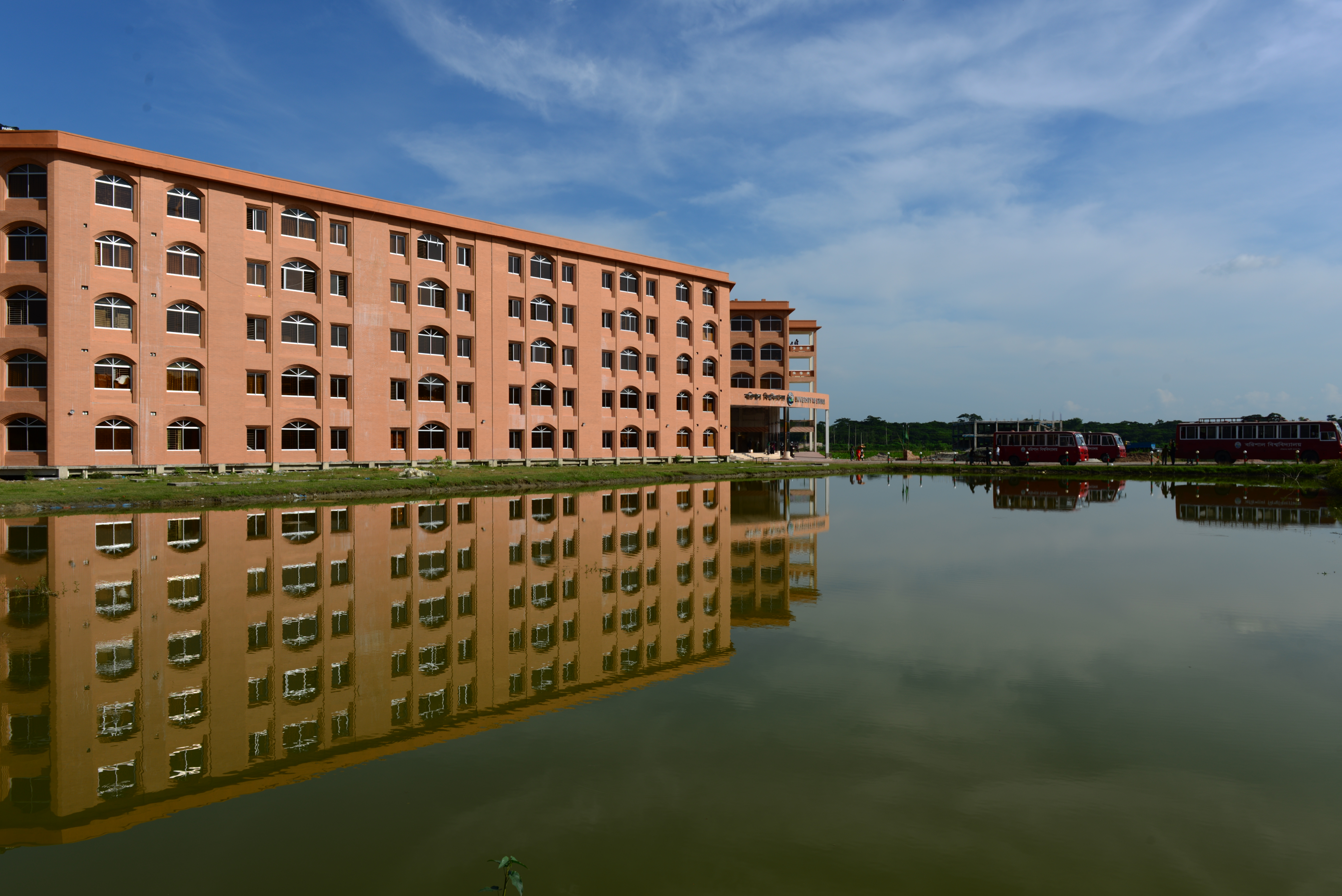
Barishal University academic building

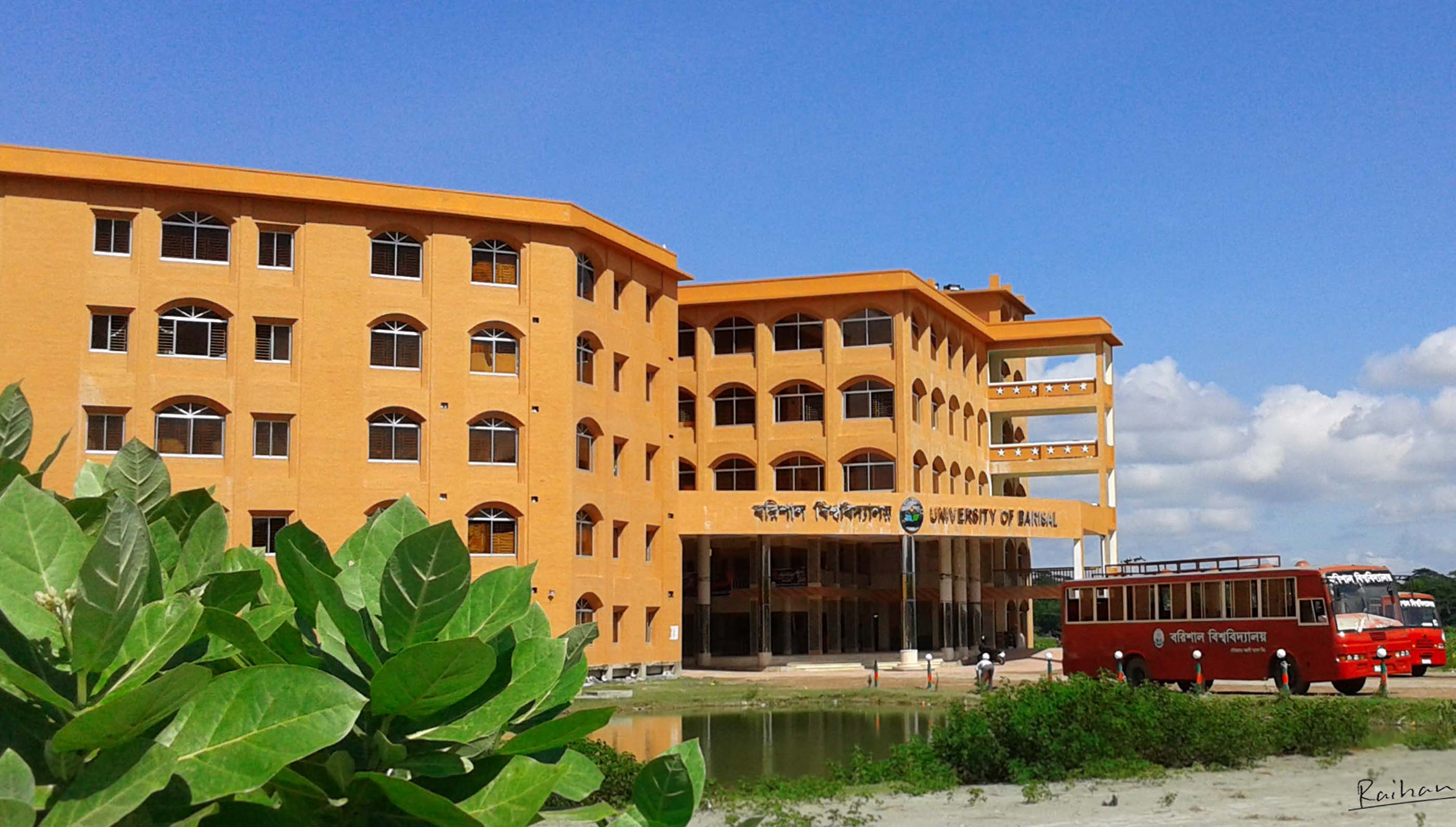
View from the highway

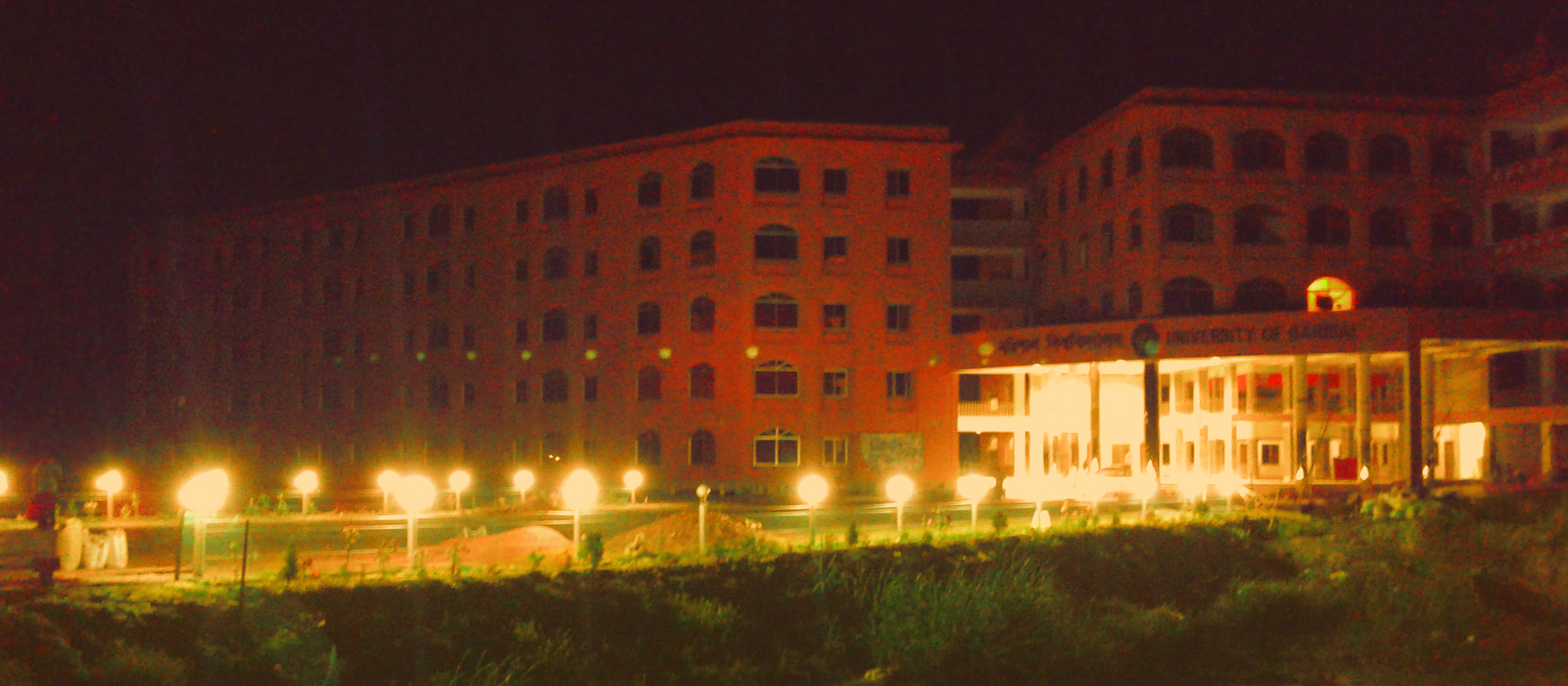
Barishal University Campus at night

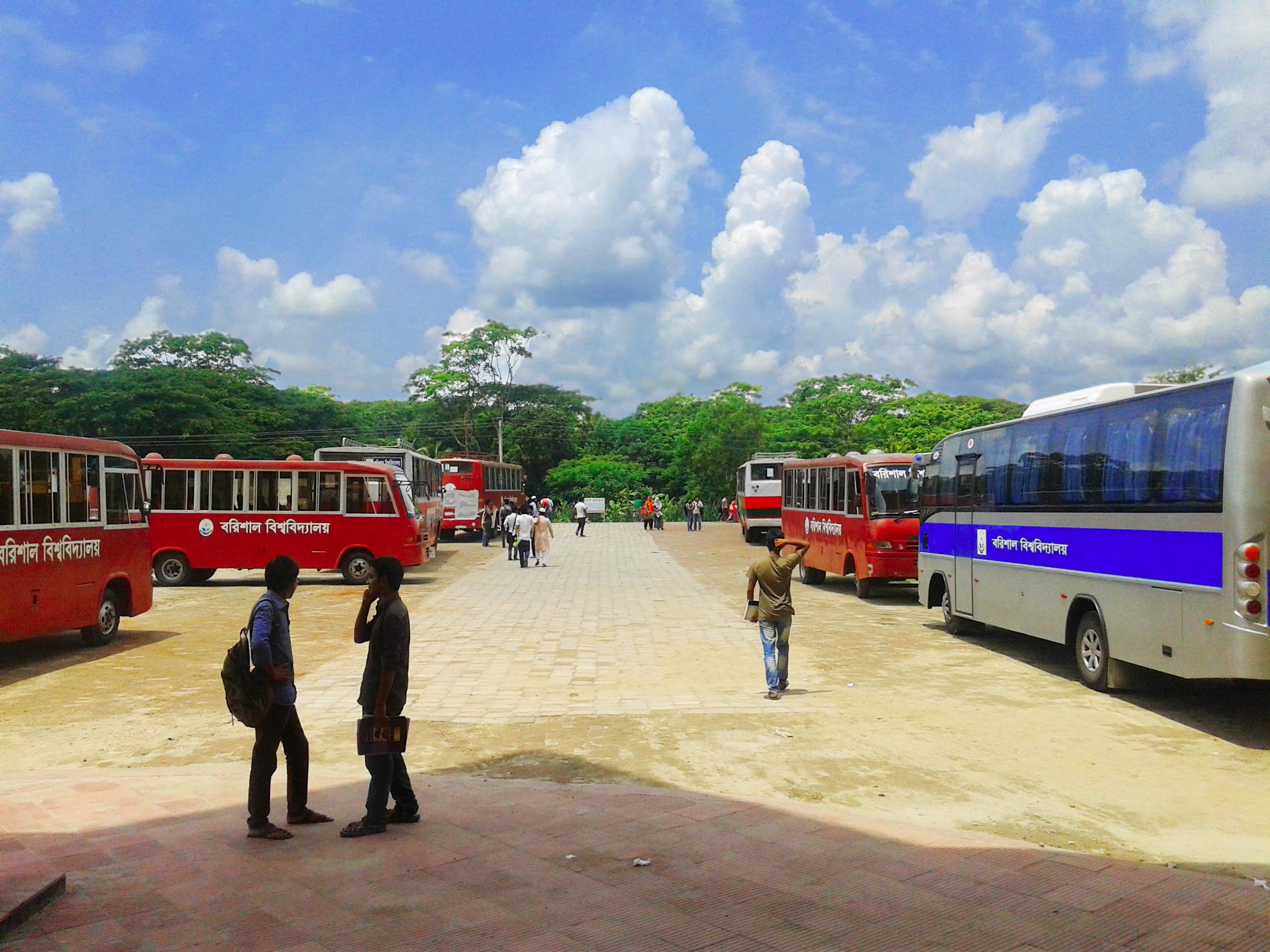
Barishal University Students and faculty buses

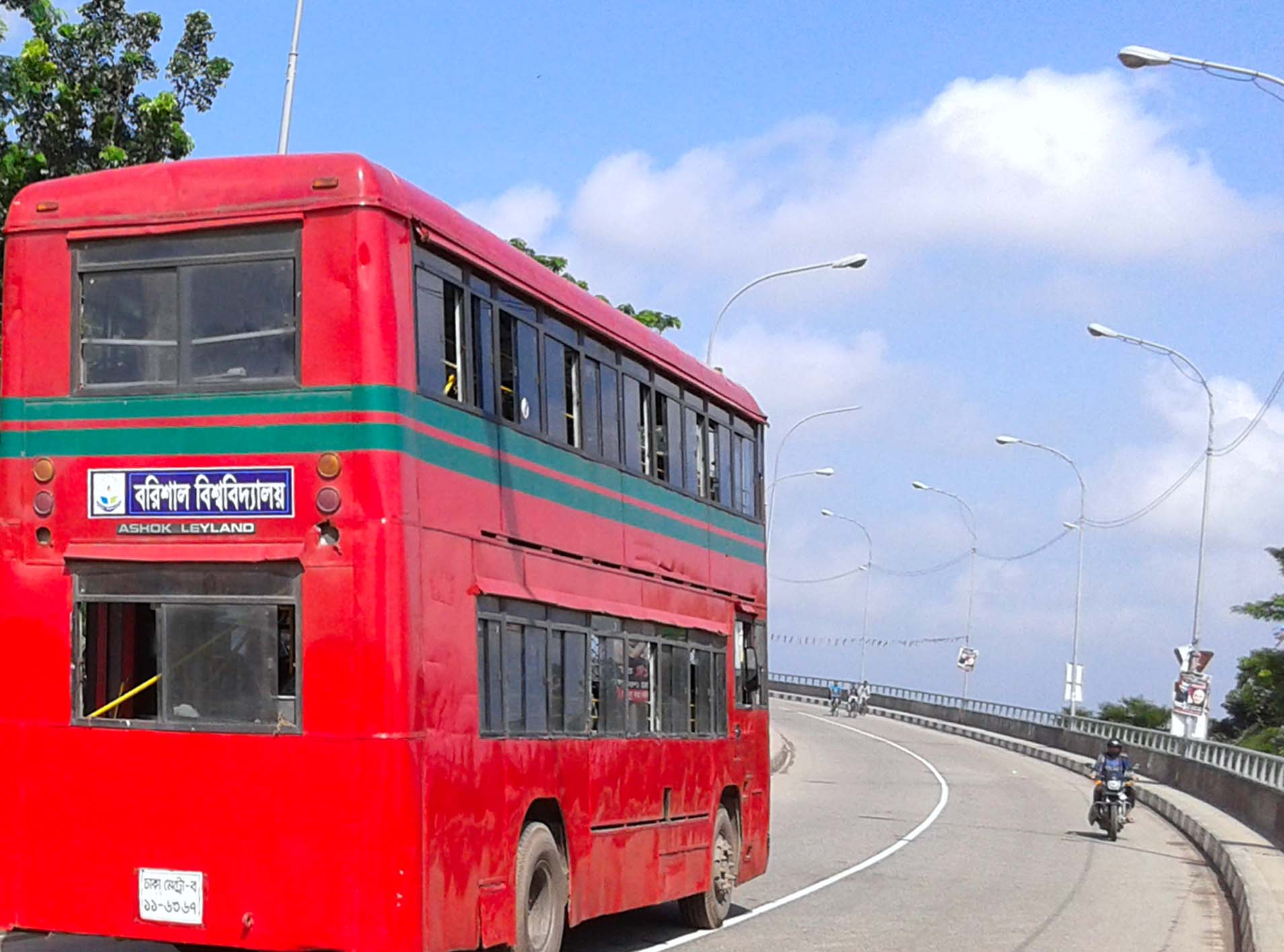
Double-decker students' bus

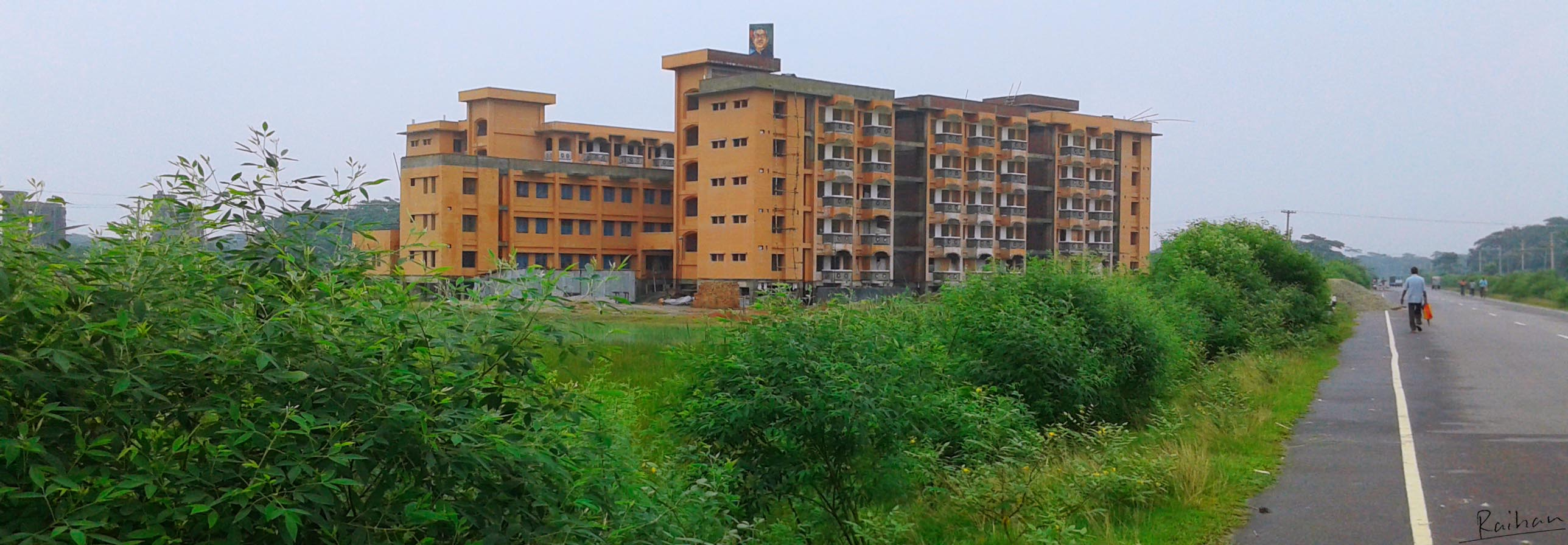
Bangobondhu Hall

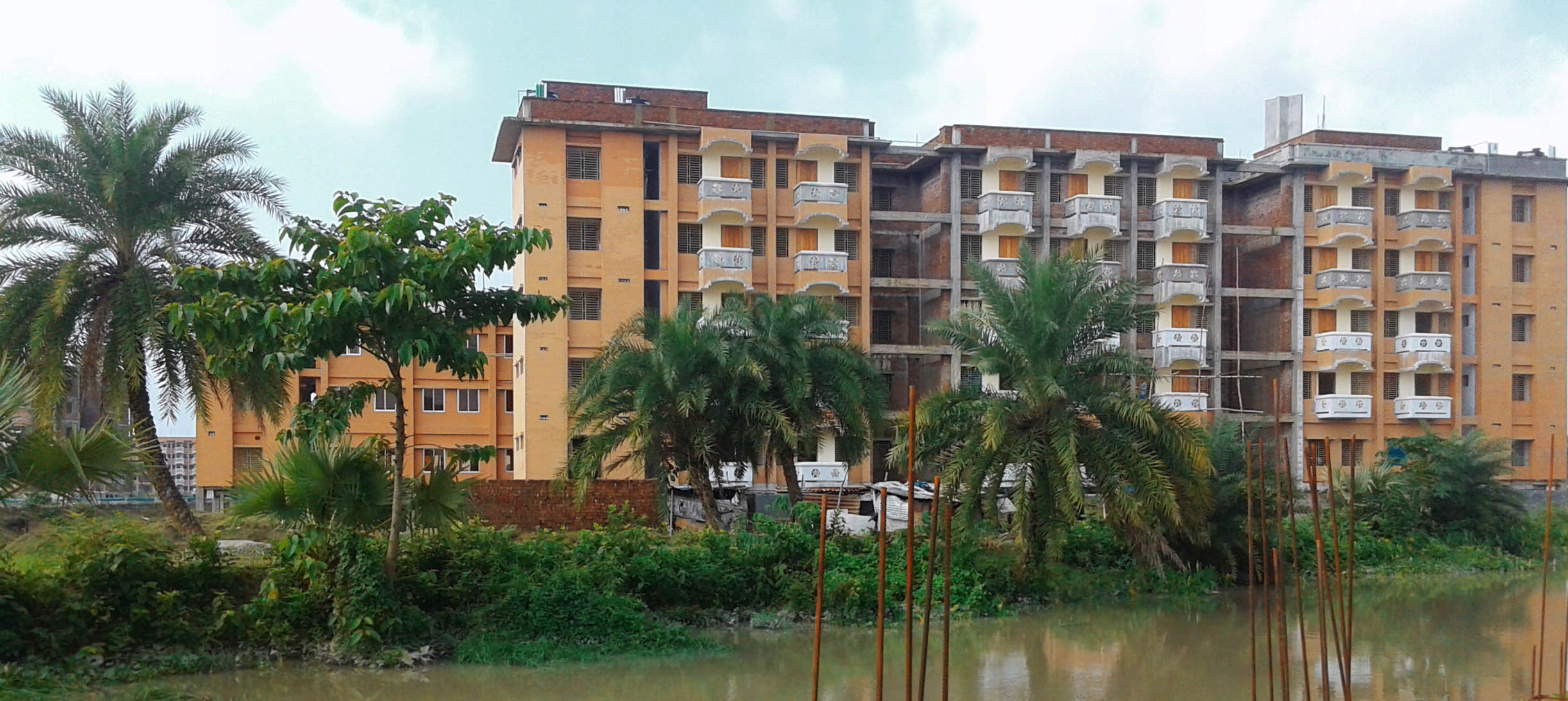
Sheikh Hasina Hall

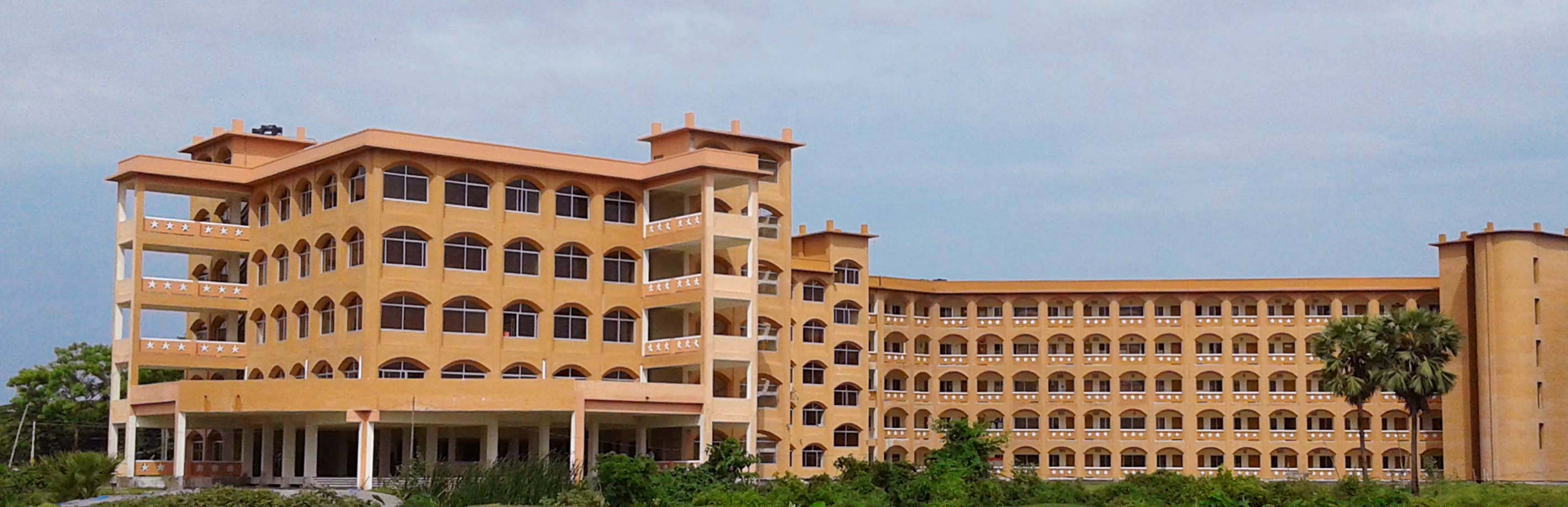
Play ground view

== Administration ==
According to the laws of University of Barishal, the university is mainly governed by two bodies; the Syndicate and the Academic Council, both chaired by vice chancellor. The position of the chancellor is chaired by the President of Bangladesh. Currently former treasurer Mohammad Badruzzaman Bhuiyan has been appointed as acting vice chancellor after Md. Sadequl Arefin's term has ended in 2023. Founder chancellor and vice chancellor were President Zillur Rahman and Md. Harunor Rashid Khan.

=== Vice chancellor ===
List of vice-chancellors
Sequence	Name	Took over	Transfer the responsibility
1	Harunor Rashid Khan	2011	2015
2	S. M. Imamul Huq	2015	2018
3	A. K. M. Mahbub Hasan (Routine-Charge)	2018	2019
4	Md. Sadequl Arefin	2019	2023
5	Budrujjaman Bhuiyan (Routine-Charge)	2023	2024
6	Susmita Sormin	2024	2024
7	Dr. Towfik Alam	2024	2026

== Academics ==
Academic activities of the university began with undergraduate classes for the 2011–12 academic year on 24 January 2012. The university initially started with four faculties (Arts, Science, Social Sciences and Business Studies) and six departments: Mathematics, Management Studies, Marketing, Economics, Sociology, and English. The university currently has 25 departments in 6 faculties. Both undergraduate and graduate degrees are provided from all the departments. The total number of undergraduate enrollment in all departments for 2023–24 academic year was 1570.The medium of instruction is English, which is the official medium of examination in effect in all departments of the university except in the department of Bangla. Bangla is occasionally followed while teaching.

Faculty	Department	Establishment	Academic Programs	Seat (Undergraduate)
Faculty of Science and Engineering	Mathematics	2012	B.Sc, M.Sc.	80
Faculty of Science and Engineering	Chemistry	2014	B.Sc, M.Sc.	80
Faculty of Science and Engineering	Computer Science & Engineering	2014	B.Sc, M.Sc.	50
Faculty of Science and Engineering	Physics	2015	B.Sc, M.Sc.	80
Faculty of Science and Engineering	Geology and Mining	2015	B.Sc, M.Sc.	60
Faculty of Science and Engineering	Statistics and Data Science	2018	B.Sc, M.Sc.	40
Faculty of Bio-Sciences	Soil and Environmental Sciences	2013	B.Sc, M.Sc.	80
Faculty of Bio-Sciences	Botany	2014	B.Sc, M.Sc.	80
Faculty of Bio-Sciences	Coastal Studies and Disaster Management	2017	B.Sc, M.Sc.	30
Faculty of Bio-Sciences	Biochemistry and Biotechnology	2018	B.Sc, M.Sc.	40
Faculty of Business Studies	Accounting and Information System	2013	BBA, MBA, EMBA	75
Faculty of Business Studies	Finance and Banking	2014	BBA, MBA, EMBA	75
Faculty of Business Studies	Marketing	2012	BBA, MBA, EMBA	75
Faculty of Business Studies	Management Studies	2012	BBA, MBA, EMBA	75
Faculty of Arts and Humanities	English	2012	BA, MA	70
Faculty of Arts and Humanities	Bangla	2013	BA, MA	70
Faculty of Arts and Humanities	Philosophy	2017	BA, MA	50
Faculty of Arts and Humanities	History and Civilization	2018	BA, MA	50
Faculty of Social Science	Economics	2012	BSS, MSS	70
Faculty of Social Science	Sociology	2012	BSS, MSS	70
Faculty of Social Science	Public Administration	2013	BSS, MSS	70
Faculty of Social Science	Political Science	2014	BSS, MSS	70
Faculty of Social Science	Mass Communication & Journalism	2018	BSS, MSS	30
Faculty of Social Science	Social Work	2023	BSS, MSS	30
Faculty of Law	Law	2014	LLB, LLM	70
