= M. Matiur Rahman =

Bangladeshi politician (1923–2018)

Minister of Road Transport and Bridges
- In office 30 November 1986 – 27 March 1988
- Preceded by: M.A. Matin
- Succeeded by: Anwar Hossain Manju

Member of the Bangladesh Parliament for Barisal-5
- In office 7 May 1986 – 6 December 1990
- Preceded by: Sunil Kumar Gupta
- Succeeded by: Abdur Rahman Biswas

Bangladesh Ambassador to Japan and South Korea
- In office 21 October 1982 – 31 August 1984
- Preceded by: Manzoor Ahmed Choudhury
- Succeeded by: A. K. N. Ahmed

Secretary of Commerce
- In office 23 January 1976 – 2 August 1982
- Preceded by: M. Nurul Islam
- Succeeded by: AFM Ehsanul Kabir

Secretary of Industries
- In office November 1975 – January 1976
- Preceded by: Majid-ul-Haq
- Succeeded by: Majid-ul-Haq

Chairman of the Trading Corporation of Pakistan
- In office 14 April 1970 – 1 February 1972
- Preceded by: S.S.Iqbal
- Succeeded by: A.M.S Ahmed

Personal details
- Born: 1 September 1923 Jaykul, Kawkhali Upazila, Pirojpur district, Bengal Presidency, British India
- Died: 9 January 2018 (aged 94) Evercare Hospital Dhaka, Dhaka, Bangladesh
- Party: Jatiya Party
- Spouse: Syeda Asia Begum (m. 1947)
- Children: 2 sons & 5 daughters

M. Matiur Rahman (1 September 1923 – 9 January 2018), briefly Matiur Rahman or Motiur, was minister of communications, a member of parliament, a secretary, and an ambassador. He played an active role in the general election of 1946. He was the founding president of Barishal Samity and East Pakistan Federation in Karachi. M Matiur Rahman was arrested during the liberation war. Later, with the efforts from Bangabandhu Sheikh Mujibur Rahman and with the help of the Red Cross in an independent Bangladesh, M Matiur Rahman returned to his homeland along with his family. After returning to Bangladesh, M Matiur Rahman joined as the secretary of the Ministry of Industries.

== Early life and education ==
Rahman was born on 1 September 1923 in Jaykul, Kawkhali Upazila, Pirojpur district, Bengal Presidency, British India. In 1938 he passed his matriculation from Kaukhali High School. He completed his intermediate from Brojomohun College in 1940. He later obtained his bachelor's degree from the same college in 1942. He later studies political science, international relations and law at the University of Dhaka.

== Career ==
Rahman joined the Department of Political Science of the University of Dhaka as a lecturer in 1948. He joined the Pakistan Civil Service in 1949. He reached the rank of deputy secretary in 1960. He served as the under secretary at the Ministry of Finance. He also served as the member of the economic pool. In 1962, he was appointed as the member (finance) of the Bangladesh Inland Water Transport Authority. In 1964 he was elevated to the rank of joint secretary and was posted to the Pakistan National Shipping Corporation as the director (finance). He was promoted to additional secretary in 1970. On 14 April 1970, Rahman was appointed as the chairman of the Trading Corporation of Pakistan. He held the position until 1st February 1972.

He was appointed as the secretary of industries in November 1975. On 23 January 1976, he was made the secretary of commerce. He held the position until 2 August 1982. He was appointed Bangladesh ambassador to Japan and South Korea on 21 October 1982. He served there until 31 August 1984.

He was elected to parliament from Barisal-5 as a Jatiya Party (Ershad) candidate in 1986 and 1988. He served as the minister of communications from 30 November 1986 to 26 March 1988.

== Personal life ==
He married Syeda Asia Begum in 1947. They had two sons and five daughters together.

== Death ==
He died on 9 January 2018 at Evercare Hospital Dhaka, Dhaka, Bangladesh. He was buried in Jaykul, Kawkhali Upazila, Pirojpur district, at his family graveyard beside his parents.
