= Bangladeshi Japanese =

Bangladeshi Japanese or Japanese Bangladeshi may refer to:

- Bangladeshi-Japanese relations
- Bangladeshis in Japan
