= Syed Muhammad Afzal =

Bengali politician

Khan Sahib Moulvi Syed Muhammad Afzal
- সৈয়দ মুহম্মদ আফজাল

East Bengal Minister of Agriculture
- In office 16 August 1947 – 14 September 1948

Chairman of the Pirojpur Municipality
- In office 1944–1950
- Preceded by: Narayan Rai Chaudhury
- Succeeded by: Aftab Uddin Ahmad

Member of the Bengal Legislative Assembly
- In office 1937–1947
- Constituency: Firozpur North

Member of the Bengal Legislative Council
- In office 1926–1930
- Constituency: Bakerganj West

Personal details
- Born: Backergunge District, Bengal Presidency
- Party: Krishak Sramik Party; Council Muslim League

Khan Sahib Syed Muhammad Afzal (Bengali: সৈয়দ মুহম্মদ আফজাল) was a Bengali politician. He served as a member of both the Bengal Legislative Council and the Bengal Legislative Assembly. Afzal was noted an early supporter of the Bengali language movement.

== Early life ==
Afzal was born into a Bengali Muslim family of Syeds from the village of Shayestabad in the Backergunge District of the Bengal Presidency.

== Career ==
Afzal was a member of the District Khilafat Committee which supported the pro-Ottoman Khilafat Movement. He was associated with the Krishak Praja Party established by A. K. Fazlul Huq. In 1937, Huq contested in several constituencies during the Bengal legislative elections and became the first ever Prime Minister of Bengal. Having successfully defeated the All-India Muslim League's candidate former Deputy Magistrate Lihaz Uddin of Kaukhali in the Firozpur North constituency, Huq gave up this seat to Afzal. The constituency covered Firozpur Sadar, Kaukhali, Swarupkathi, Banaripara and Nazirpur. Afzal was a member of the first Governing Board of the Fazlul Haq College in Chakhar founded by A. K. Fazlul Huq in 1940. Despite the party struggling to gain support at the 1946 elections as a result of the growing popularity of the Muslim League's Pakistan Movement, Afzal preserved his Firozpur North seat against Abdus Subhan Mia of the Muslim League.

He served as the chairman of the Pirojpur Municipality from 1944 to 1950. After partition, Afzal joined the Muslim League and became the Minister of Agriculture under Khawaja Nazimuddin on 16 August 1947. On 12 November 1947, he attended a Tamaddun Majlish literary conference at the Fazlul Huq Muslim Hall where he expressed his support for the Bengali language movement alongside Health Minister Habibullah Bahar Chowdhury and Civil Supplies Minister Nurul Amin. Clashes began between the pro-Urdu and pro-Bengali groups on 12 December 1947. A group of protestors harassed several ministers including Afzal and Education Minister Abdul Hamid, with Afzal being dragged from one place to another on the balcony within the secretariat area. Abdul Hamid came out and stated that he would resign if Bengali is not given a national status. Afzal refused police intervention to safeguard himself from the protestors, and promised the protestors that he is a supporter of the movement, urging them to calm down. He became a member of the East Bengal Language Committee and signed a twelve-member memorandum requesting the government to recognise and promote an official standardised Bengali language based on Eastern Bengali. Among those that signed the letter are Mohammad Akram Khan, Abdullah al-Baqi, Muhammad Shahidullah, Habibullah Bahar Chowdhury, Mizanur Rahman (Deputy Minister of Education), Syed Abul Hasnat Muhammad Ismail (Deputy Inspector-General of Police), Ajit Kumar Guha, AQM Adamuddin (Professor, Naogaon Islamic Intermediate College), Abul Kalam Shamsuddin, Shamsunnahar Mahmud and Shaikh Sharafuddin (Professor, Islamic Intermediate College). On 28 June 1948, Afzal laid the foundation of the main building of the Sri Sundari High School in Lalpur, Natore.

Afzal later joined the Council Muslim League, and became the president of its Bengal branch. He was arrested after the independence of Bangladesh for allegedly supporting the Pakistan Army.
