= Muhammad Nurul Islam =

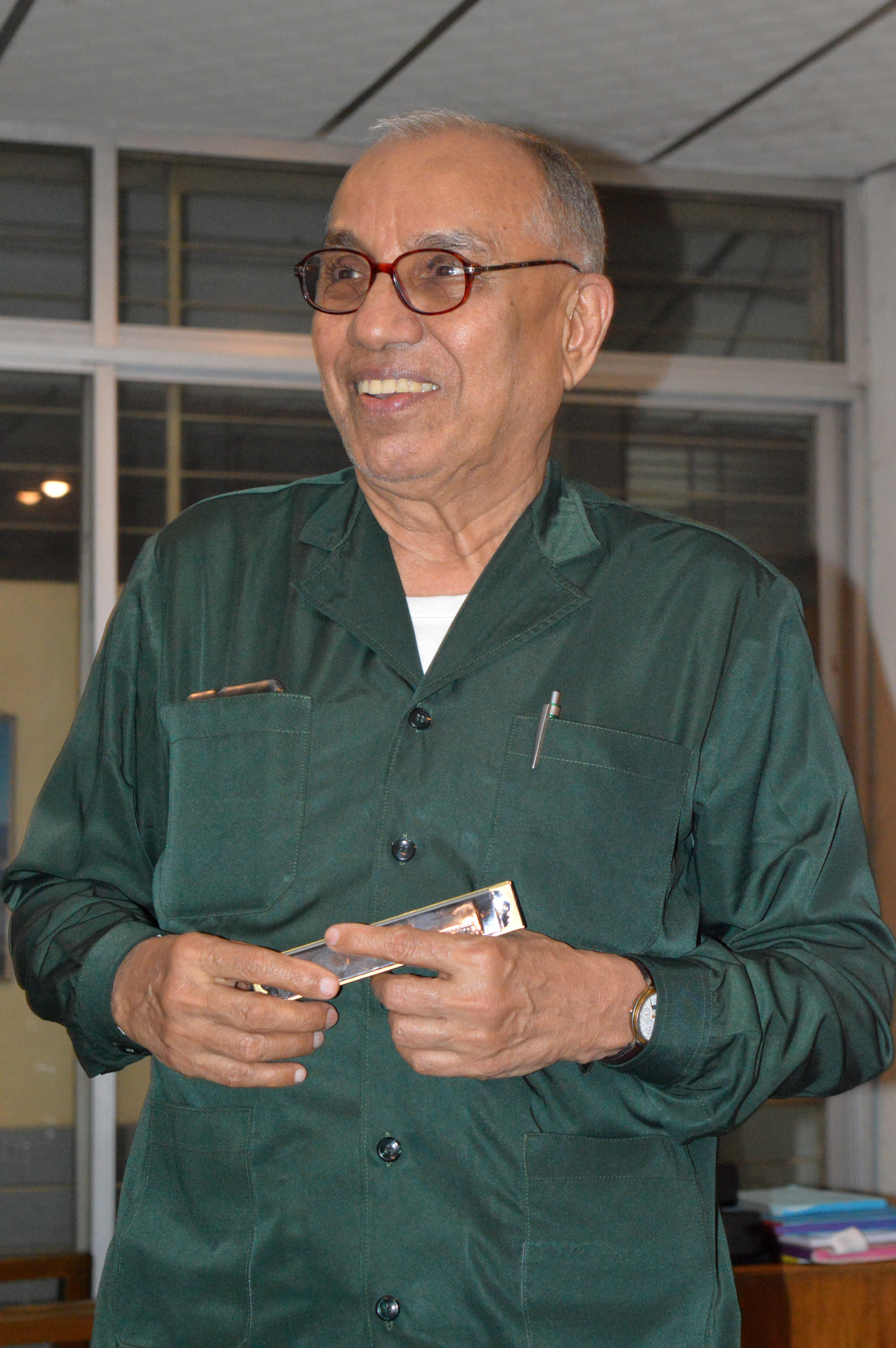
- Islam at the 12th Anniversary of Bengali Wikipedia celebration in Chittagong

Honorary Consul-General of Japan in Chittagong
- Incumbent
- Assumed office Honorary Consul: 1990–2000; Honorary Consul-General: 2000–

Personal details
- Born: 1943 (age 82–83) Chittagong, Bengal Province, British India
- Children: 1
- Education: University of Tokyo; University of Dhaka
- Profession: Diplomat

Muhammad Nurul Islam (born c. 1943) is a Bangladeshi diplomat from Chittagong. He currently serves as the Honorary Consul-General of Japan in Chittagong, Bangladesh. He is one of the Consuls-General among 102 foreign representatives in Bangladesh, and one of 15 foreign representatives in Chittagong.

On November 3, 2012, the Government of Japan honored him as 2012 Fall Imperial Decorations on the occasion of the 40th anniversary of diplomatic relations between Bangladesh and Japan, where he received "the Order of the Rising Sun, Gold Rays with Neck Ribbon". Nurul Islam is the fifth Bangladeshi who received the honor.

== Early life and education ==
Islam was born in 1943 in Chittagong in the then British India (now in Bangladesh) and passed his childhood in the city.

In 1963, he was graduated from the Chittagong College under the University of Dhaka. In 1968, he completes a degree in the Japanese language at the University of Tokyo under the Japan Foundation’s scholarship scheme.

== Career ==
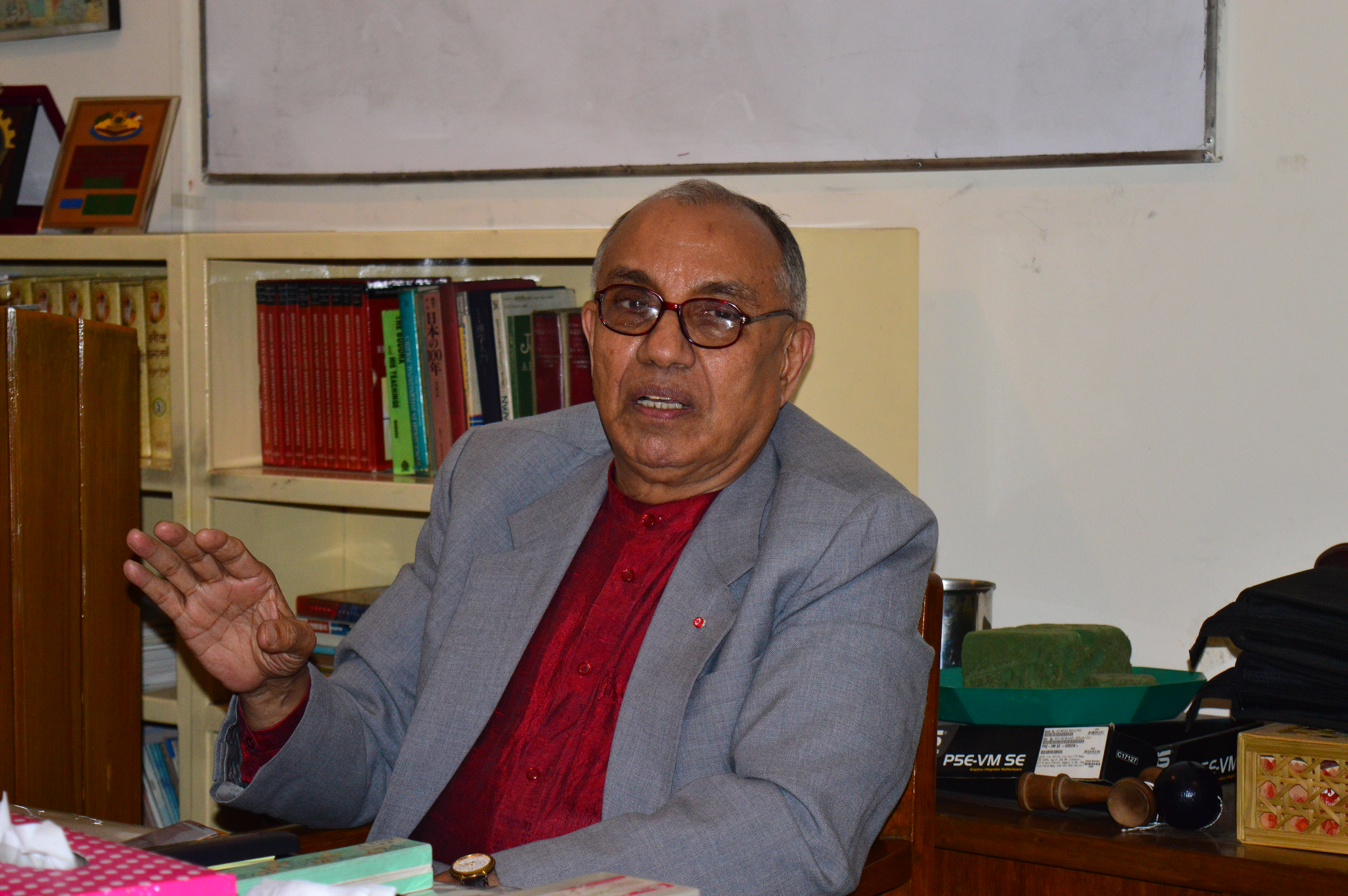
Islam in Chittagong (2013)

In 1987, Nurul Islam has founded Nippon Academy in Chittagong for the proposed to facilitate learning of the Japanese language and Japan studies in Bangladesh, and the founder of Association for Overseas Technical Scholarship, Chittagong. Alongside in 1989 he founded AOTS (The Association for Overseas Human Resources and Industry Development Association) Alumni Society to introduce Japanese-style business management in Bangladesh. In 1990, he was responsible as the Honorary Consul of Japan in Chittagong and served until 2000 and then he was responsible for the second time as the Honorary Consul-General. He is the vice president of the World Federation of Consuls (FICAC).

== Honor ==
- The Order of the Rising Sun (2012, Japan)
