= Kawkhali =

Kaukhali
- Location in Bangladesh
- Coordinates: 22°38′N 90°4′E
- Country: Bangladesh
- Division: Barisal Division
- District: Pirojpur District

Area
  - Total: 80 km^{2} (31 sq mi)

Population (2011)
  - Total: 70,515
- Time zone: UTC+6 (Bangladesh Time)
- Postal code: 8510
- Website: http://kawkhali.pirojpur.gov.bd/

Kaukhali is a small town in Pirojpur District in the Barisal Division of southwestern Bangladesh. It is the mother town of Kaukhali Upazila, Pirojpur. Kaukhali's communication depends on rivers and roads, particulaly the Sandhya river. It has a launch & steamer station which date from British period. The Gabkhan Channel starts from Kaukhali near the village of Ashoa. On it many ships run from Mongla seaport to Dhaka.
