= Joykul =

Joykul জয়কুল Jaykul
- Location in Bangladesh
- Coordinates: 22.604°N 90.084°E
- Country: Bangladesh
- Division: Barisal Division
- District: Pirojpur District
- Sub-district (upazila): Kawkhali Upazila, Pirojpur
- Union: Kaukhali Union
- Time zone: UTC+6 (Bangladesh Time)
- Postal code: 8512

Joykul or Jaykul (Bengali: জয়কুল) is a village in Kaukhali Union, Kawkhali sub-district, Pirojpur District in the Barisal Division of southwestern Bangladesh. It has a population of 1,192 according to the 2022 census.

== Notable people ==
- M. Matiur Rahman
