= Embassy of Bangladesh, Tokyo =

Diplomatic mission of Bangladesh

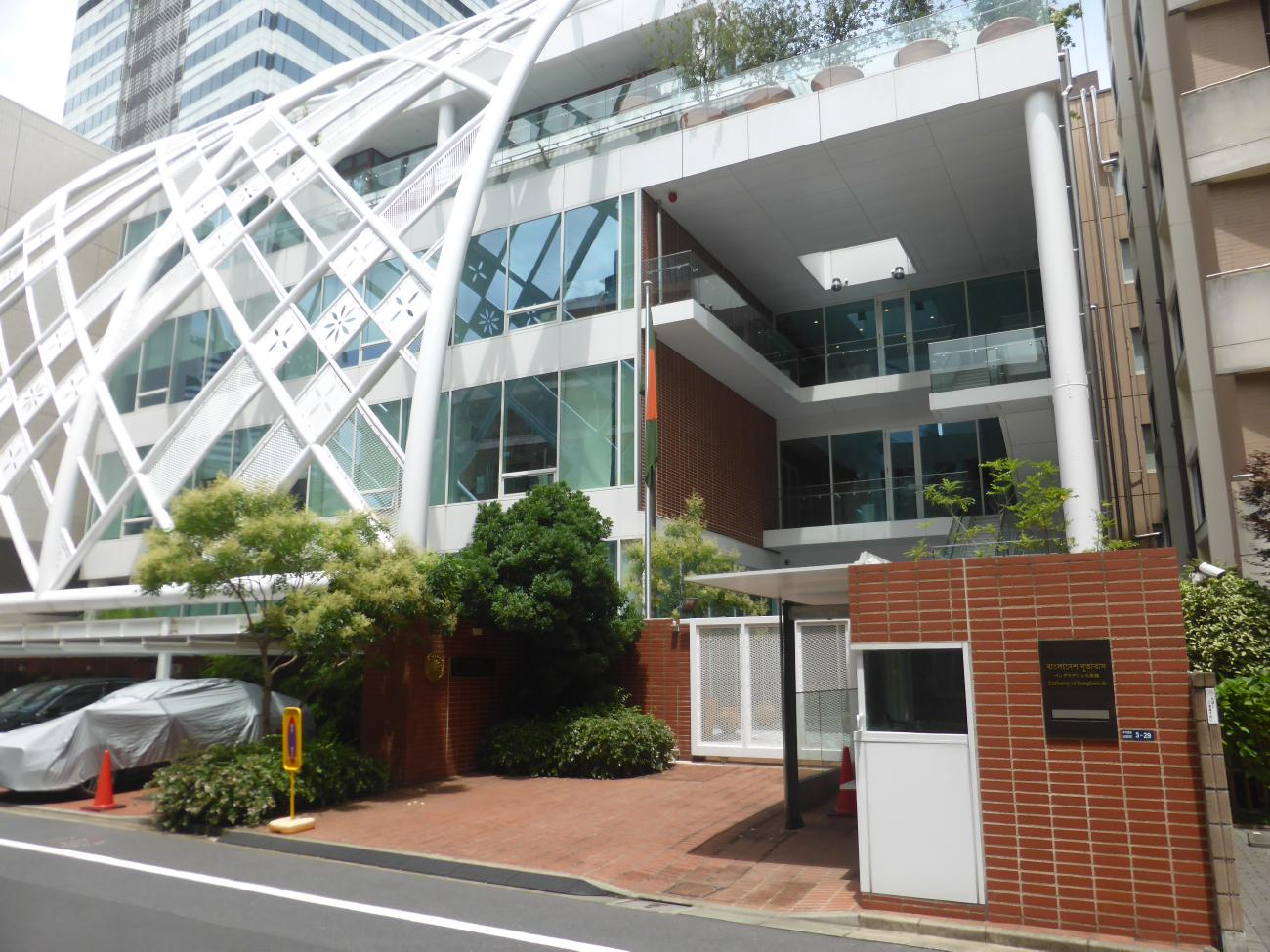
- Embassy of Bangladesh, Tokyo
- Location: Tokyo, Japan
- Address: Kioichō, Chiyoda
- Coordinates: 35.681703°N 139.737689°E
- Opened: 3 March 1972
- Ambassador: Md Daud Ali
- Website: bdembjp.mofa.gov.bd

The Embassy of Bangladesh, Tokyo is the diplomatic mission of the People's Republic of Bangladesh to Japan. It is located in Kioichō, which is in the Chiyoda special ward of Tokyo. The current ambassador to Japan is Md Daud Ali.

== History ==
Bangladesh and Japan established diplomatic ties with each other on 10 February 1972. The country opened its embassy in Tokyo on 3 March 1972. On 10 February 2022, coinciding with the 50th anniversary of relations between Bangladesh and Japan, the embassy hosted a ceremony celebrating the occasion. Shahabuddin Ahmed was the ambassador to Japan, appointed in 2020, before being replaced by Md Daud Ali following Ahmed's termination in September 2024.

== See also ==
- Bangladesh–Japan relations
