= Ashoa =

Village in Bangladesh

Ashoa is a small village in Kawkhali Upazila of Pirojpur District in Bangladesh. The Gabkhan Channel, which is known as the Suez Canal of Bangladesh, starts from beside this village.
