= Embassy of Japan, Dhaka =

Embassy of Japan in Dhaka জাপানের দূতাবাস, ঢাকা
- Location: Dhaka, Bangladesh
- Address: 5 & 7, Dutabash Road, Baridhara, Dhaka 1212
- Coordinates: 23.7990002°N 90.418131°E
- Opened: February 11, 1972
- Ambassador: Naoki Ito
- Website: www.bd.emb-japan.go.jp/itprtop_en/

The Embassy of Japan in Dhaka (Bengali: জাপানের দূতাবাস, ঢাকা) is the diplomatic mission of Japan in Bangladesh. Naoki Ito is the current ambassador of Japan in Bangladesh who was appointed on October in 2019.

== History ==
Before the independence of Bangladesh, Japan had maintained diplomatic relations with both West and East Pakistan since their independence from American rule in 1952. Japanese government loan of US$255 million was granted to help to develop Pakistan during 1961–70, and US$155 million, or around 61 percent of that, was allocated into East Pakistan. In 1971, a fund for assistance to the Bangladesh Liberation War was raised in Ginza, Tokyo. The Consulate-General of Japan in Dhaka had been kept until December 11 of the same year.

Also in December 1971, Japan urged Pakistan and India to stop their hostile military action against Bengali citizens, and for that reason Japan cut off aid to both countries. Japan recognized Bangladesh on February 10, 1972, and on the next day the Embassy of Japan in Dhaka was opened with Ambassador Takashi Oyamada.

== Honorary consulate-general of Japan in Chattogram ==
Honorary consulate-general of Japan in Chattogram (Bengali: জাপানের অনারারি কনস্যুলেট জেনারেল, চট্টগ্রাম) is an extended office of Japanese diplomacy beyond its standard network by the embassy. Since 1990 it has been headed by former Honorary Consul and current Honorary Consul-General Muhammad Nurul Islam, who received the Order of the Rising Sun, Gold Rays with Neck Ribbon on November 3, 2012.

== Japanese radio in Bengali ==
- NHK Radio Japan (Bengali)

== Cultural organizations ==
- Japan Foundation (Grant programme)
- Japanese Universities Alumni Association in Bangladesh (JUAAB) (Ikebana)

== See also ==
- Bangladesh–Japan relations
- Foreign relations of Bangladesh
- Foreign relations of Japan
- Ministry of Foreign Affairs (Bangladesh)
- Ministry of Foreign Affairs (Japan)
