= Bangladesh–Japan relations =

Bilateral relations

- Bangladesh: Japan

Diplomatic mission
- Embassy of Bangladesh, Tokyo: Embassy of Japan, Dhaka

Envoy
- Ambassador Mohammed Daud Ali: Ambassador Naoki Ito

Bangladesh–Japan relations (Bengali: বাংলাদেশ-জাপান সম্পর্ক, Japanese: バングラデシュと日本の関係) are the are the bilateral relations between the People's Republic of Bangladesh and Japan. Both countries have maintained a strong geopolitical bond throughout contemporary history. Since Japan officially recognized Bangladesh on 10 February 1972, the two nations have maintained a secure and comfortable diplomatic relationship.

Japan plays a significant role in the development of the economy and infrastructure of Bangladesh, with intentions to boost contributions to its development within multiple sectors in the near future. There is a strong and multifaceted relationship between the two countries, reinforced by mutual trust and economic reliance.

In a BBC World Poll, 71% of Bangladesh had a favourable view of Japan, making Bangladesh one of the most pro-Japanese countries in the world.

== Historical background ==
Relations between Bangladesh and Japan, jeopardized during the British period and Partition of Bengal in 1947, were normalized in mid-1950 when the Consular Mission of Japan (CMJ) in Dhaka promoted cultural exchange and strengthened ties with the people of Bangladesh through interpersonal initiatives.

=== BIG-B Program ===
The Bay of Bengal Industrial Growth Belt (Big B), is a long-term plan to strengthen the existing partnership between Bangladesh and Japan. This plan was conceived Prime Minister Shinzo Abe during his visit to Matarbari. During Prime Minister Shinzo Abe's visit to Dhaka in 2014, initial talks with Bangladesh Prime Minister Sheikh Hasina and Bangladesh and Japan agreed to implement this plan.

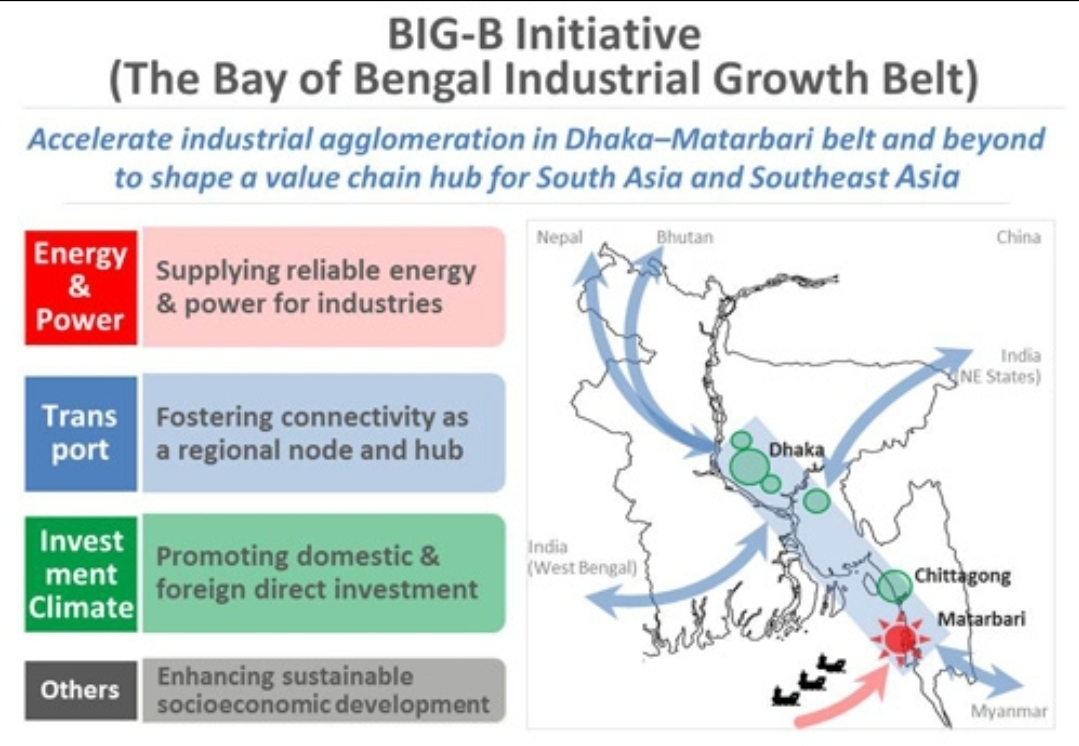
BIG-B 1st Stage

== Embassies ==
On 11 February 1972, Bangladesh opened an embassy in Tokyo, and Japan opened an embassy in Dhaka. The Embassy of Japan in Bangladesh is located at 5 & 7, Dutabash Road, Baridhara, Dhaka, where it has been located since the early 1990s.

== Trade and investment ==
Japan is Bangladesh's 7th-largest export market as of 2015; imports from Bangladesh make up 0.17% of all Japanese imports. Common imports from Bangladesh to Japan include textiles, leather goods, and shrimp. By 2004, Japan had become Bangladesh's fourth-largest source of foreign direct investment, behind the United States, United Kingdom, and Malaysia. Japan is also a significant source of development aid to Bangladesh.

Japan's political goals in its relationship with Bangladesh include gaining support for their bid to join the United Nations Security Council, and securing markets for their finished goods.

In 2022, there were about 24,940 Bangladeshis in Japan. Both parties celebrated thirty years of diplomatic relations in 2002. Starting from 1 September 2023, there are direct flights from Dhaka to Tokyo-Narita Airport operated by Biman Bangladesh Airlines 3 times a week.

in 2025, Bangladesh signed its first comprehensive economic partnership deal with Japan.

== Strength of relations ==
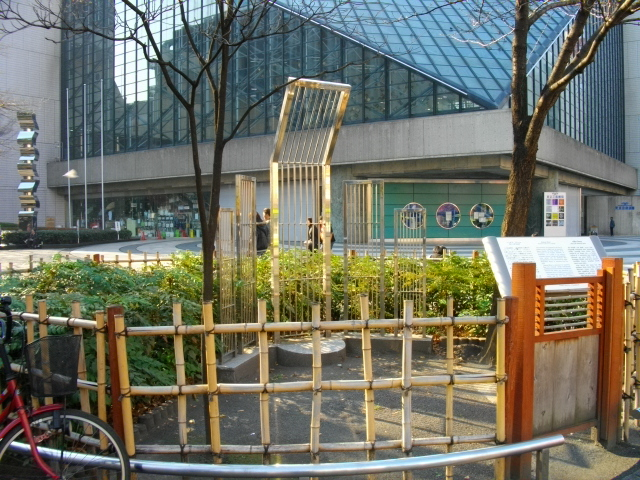
Replica of the Shaheed Minar at the Ikebukuro West Exit Park, Tokyo

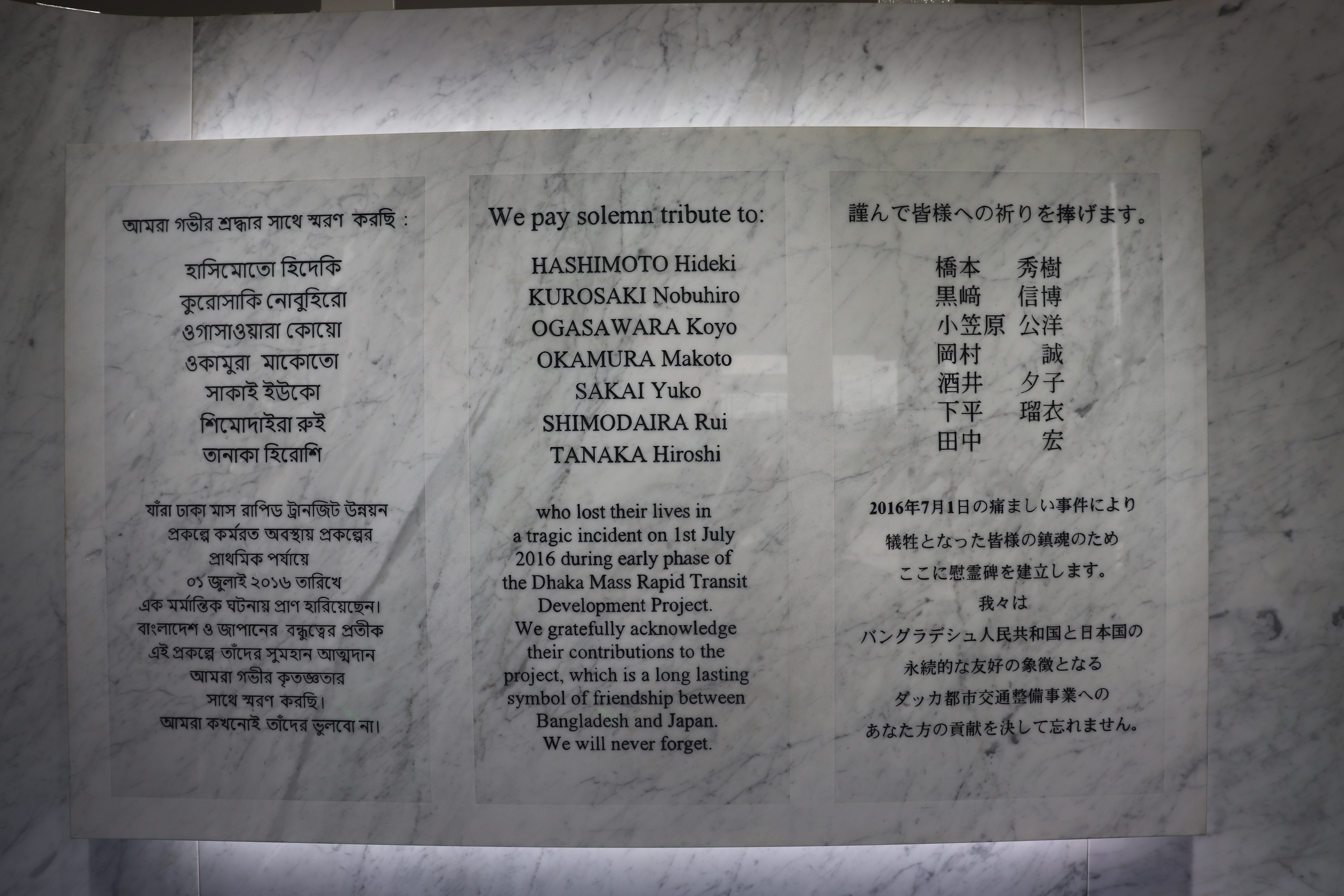
A memorial for seven Japanese officials of MRT Line 6 died during the attack at Metro Rail Exhibition and Information Centre, Diabari

The strategic partnership between Bangladesh and Japan is characterized by a deep and trusting relationship, evident in Japan's unequivocal support for Bangladesh's key infrastructure projects. Japan's commitment is seen in the construction of the Matarbari Deep Sea Port, a crucial component of the region's connectivity, and the ongoing modernization and expansion of Dhaka International Airport, including the construction of its third terminal. Beyond infrastructure, Japan's involvement in these vital projects stems from a strategic vision for the region's development and stability. This cooperative dynamic is expanding into the military field, reflecting a mutual interest in the security of the Asia-Pacific region and a shared future.

On 12 July 2005, a replica of the Shaheed Minar was installed in Ikebukuro West Exit Park as the first permanent Shaheed Minar outside Bangladesh. It was initiated and inaugurated under the leadership of Bangladeshi Prime Minister Khaleda Zia.

Moreover, after the war in Ukraine and Russia. Currently, Japan has undergone a considerable shift in its military policy after the war in Ukraine and Russia, evidenced in its intent to sell manufactured weapons and other military equipment to Bangladesh

== See also ==
- Bangladeshis in Japan
