= Islam Mohamed Himu =

Bangladeshi businessman

Islam Mohamed Himu (イスラム・モハメッド・ヒム, Isuramu Mohameddo Himu; Bengali: ইসলাম মোহামেদ হিমু) is a Bangladeshi businessman in Japan who was accused of al-Qaeda-related activities.

== Early life ==
Himu lived in Canada, where he met and married a Japanese woman; the two came to Japan together in 1995. After moving to Japan, he lived in Toda, Saitama Prefecture, and had two children with his wife. He established a telecommunications business, Ryo International, in 1995, which sold prepaid telephone cards and mobile phones; it had been growing rapidly, from ¥40 a million of sales in 2000 to ¥350 a million in 2001 and ¥800 a million in 2003. He gained permanent residency in Japan in 2000. He had an office in Tokyo's Akihabara district as well a branch in Yokosuka, where he employed three Filipina immigrants, but rarely visited the Yokosuka office, according to the building's owner.

== Arrest and release ==
Himu was arrested in a dawn raid on 26 May 2004 in Tokyo on charges of falsifying business-related documents; police targeted him because of his alleged connection to French fugitive Lionel Dumont, who had stayed in Japan between 2002 and 2003. He had met Dumont at a mosque in Isesaki, Gunma Prefecture in 1999; eager to do business, Himu gave Dumont his namecard, and sold him several phone cards. Police also raided the branch office in Yokosuka, where they arrested a Bangladeshi employee of Himu's. The media referred to him as "Japan's first suspected Islamic terrorist", while United States Forces Japan spokesmen claimed he had been seen at the Yokosuka Naval Base directly across from his office "gathering intelligence". He had been under surveillance for nearly a year before the arrest, according to Japanese media reports.

Himu was indicted on 7 July 2004 by the Tokyo Summary Court, which ordered him to pay a fine of ¥300,000 for his violation of the Immigration Control and Refugee Recognition Law, consisting of having employed his younger brother and another illegal foreign resident between August 2001 and May 2004. Following his payment of the fine, he was released. The prosecutors declined to indict him on any charges relating to alleged al-Qaeda connections.

== Lawsuit ==
After Himu's release, he found his business and his life disrupted; his employees had all departed, and bills he had been unable to collect while in custody while his suppliers waited for payment left him with ¥120 million in debt. Many of his former associates declined to do business with him anymore; transportation companies even refused to ship his products. Eventually, with his business bankrupt, he closed down his existing offices and opened up a new business under a different name. Several countries also barred him from obtaining a visa due to the unproven allegations.

In April 2005, Himu filed a human rights complaint with the Japan Federation of Bar Associations, hoping to gain a public apology from senior police officials and the Japanese media, whom he accused of having "ruined [his] life". In October of that year, he also filed libel suits in the Tokyo District Court in his own name and that of his company against various media organisations, including Kyodo News and the Nippon Television Network. In December 2007, the Tokyo District Court ordered the Sankei Shimbun to pay Himu in compensation for their having published a front-page report giving his true name and falsely claiming he was a "top terrorist"; the court stated that the publication of his name was inappropriate.

== See also ==
- Bangladeshis in Japan
