= Shahabuddin Ahmed (ambassador) =

Bangladeshi bureaucrat, ambassador

Ambassador of Bangladesh to Japan
- In office 11 September 2020 – 5 September 2024
- Preceded by: Rabab Fatima
- Succeeded by: Md Daud Ali

Personal details
- Born: 1960 (age 65–66) Bhola District, East Pakistan, Pakistan
- Education: University of Dhaka; University of Birmingham

Shahabuddin Ahmed is a Bangladeshi civil servant. He is a former ambassador of Bangladesh to Japan and a former secretary of the Ministry of Food.

== Early life ==
Ahmed was born in 1960 in Bhola District, East Pakistan, Pakistan. He did his bachelor's degree and master's in soil sciences from the University of Dhaka in 1981 and 1982 respectively. He has a second master's in development finance from the University of Birmingham.

== Career ==
Ahmed joined the Bangladesh Civil Service in 1986.

In September 2009, Ahmed was promoted from senior assistant secretary to deputy secretary.

Ahmed was appointed the acting secretary of the Ministry of Food in December 2017 from the Ministry of Finance. From December 2017 to December 2019, Ahmed was the secretary of the Ministry of Food. In April 2019, he visited Harvard University to attend a Leadership in Crises executive program paid for by a project for a capacity building for civil servants. He took his family with him whose expenses were paid by him.

Ahmed was appointed the ambassador of Bangladesh to Japan in March 2020 while on post retirement leave for a three-year term. He replaced Ambassador Rabab Fatima who was appointed the Permanent Representative of Bangladesh to the United Nations. He inaugurated the Bangladesh booth at the Fashion World Tokyo and urged more investment from Japan in Bangladesh. He has urged Japan to recruit more workers from Bangladesh. He was terminated after the fall of the Sheikh Hasina led Awami League government.
