= Ikebukuro Nishiguchi Park =

Park in Tokyo, Japan

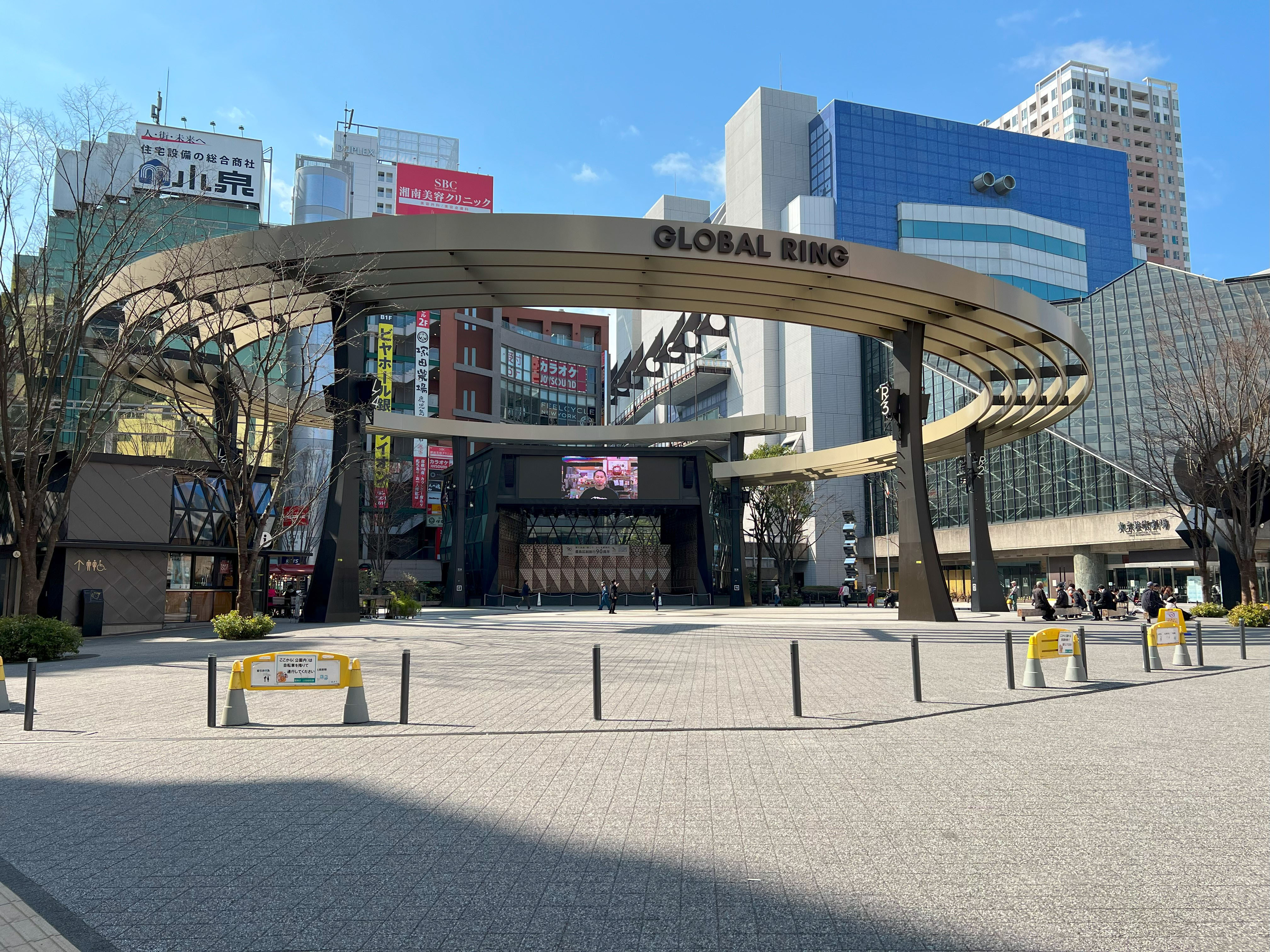
- Interactive map of Ikebukuro Nishiguchi Park
- Location: Toshima, Tokyo, Japan
- Coordinates: 35.730197°N 139.7067049°E
- Area: 3,123.19 square metres (0.77176 acres)
- Created: 1970
- Public transit: Ikebukuro Station

Ikebukuro Nishiguchi Park (豊島区立池袋西口公園, Toshima Kuritsu Ikebukuro Nishiguchi Kōen) is a public park in Toshima, Tokyo, Japan. It is adjacent to Ikebukuro Station West Exit Bus Terminal.

== Overview ==
There is a fountain in the center of the park that is illuminated at night. In addition, there are several objects in the park that are shaped like people, creating an atmosphere suitable for a park in front of a theatre (Tokyo Metropolitan Theatre). Most of the ground is covered with tiles.

== Access ==
- By train: About a 1-minute walk from Ikebukuro Station.

== See also ==
- Parks and gardens in Tokyo
- National Parks of Japan
