= Bangladeshis in Japan =

Japanese Bangladeshis
জাপানী বাংলাদেশী

Total population
- 44,938 (in December, 2025)

Regions with significant populations
- Tokyo (mainly Shinjuku and Shibuya), Anjō, Chiba, Handa, Kariya, Kawasaki, Kōbe, Komaki, Kyoto, Nagoya, Ōsaka, Saitama, Sakai, Tōkai, Yokohama

Languages
- English · Bengali · Japanese

Religion
- Islam, Hinduism, Buddhism, Christianity, Shintoism

Related ethnic groups
- Bangladeshi diaspora

Bangladeshis in Japan (Japanese: 在日バングラデシュ人) form one of the smaller populations of foreigners in Japan. In December 2025), there were 44,938 Bangladeshi nationals in Japan.

== Migration history ==
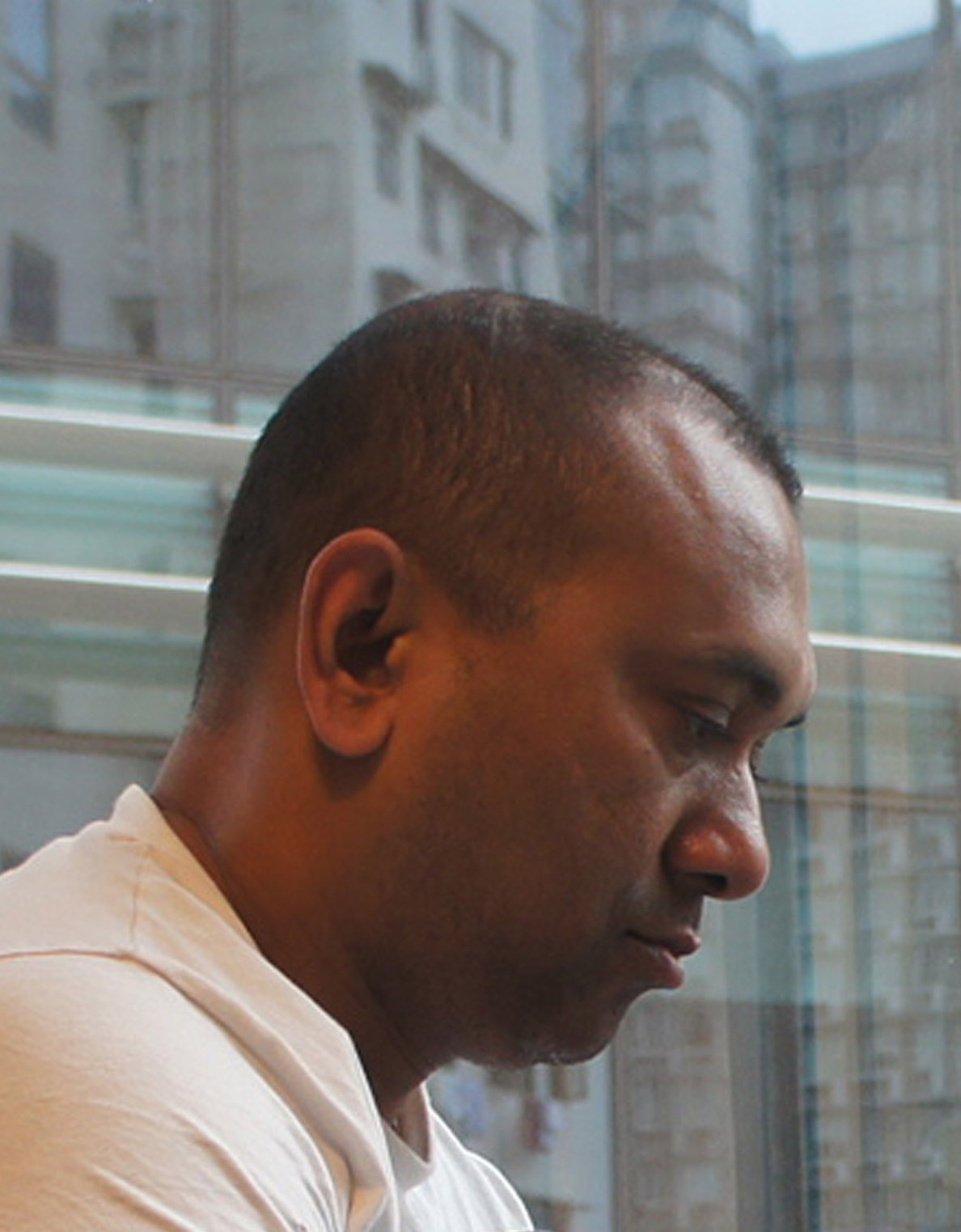
Firoz Mahmud, visual artist and educator

Bangladeshi labour migration to Japan, is believed to have begun around 1985 after the inception of Bangladesh in 1971. Prospective workers would obtain student visas to enter into language schools, allowing them to work legally up to 20 hours per week to support themselves. They used their period of study to put down roots in Japan and find more permanent full-time work. Such migration reached a peak in 1988, but dropped off sharply in 1989 when Japanese authorities tightened the requirements for obtaining student visas.

In the late 1980s and early 1990s, deportations jumped sharply, with nearly five thousand in 1990 alone. After this, new arrivals and previous deportees turned to people smugglers to re-enter Japan. A 2007 survey estimated that a quarter of illegal migrants from Bangladesh arrived after April 1989.

Even after the bursting of the Japanese asset price bubble, their wages remained relatively high, typically exceeding 150% of the minimum wage. Bangladeshi migrants prefer Japan to Saudi Arabia or the United Arab Emirates and consider it a more "prestigious destination", due to the higher wages.

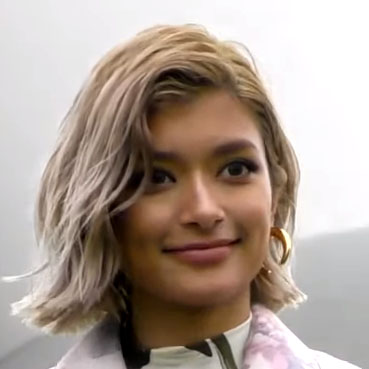
Rola, Fashion model, TV personality, actress, singer

== Notable individuals ==
- Rikuto Hashimoto, Japanese footballer
- Islam Mohamed Himu, businessman
- Shuki Itofusa, Footballer
- Firoz Mahmud, contemporary visual artist
- Rola (born 1990), fashion model and celebrity
- Sumaya Matsushima, footballer

== See also ==
- Bangladesh–Japan relations
- Bangladeshi diaspora
- Immigration to Japan
