= Md Daud Ali =

Bangladeshi diplomat

- মোঃ দাউদ আলী
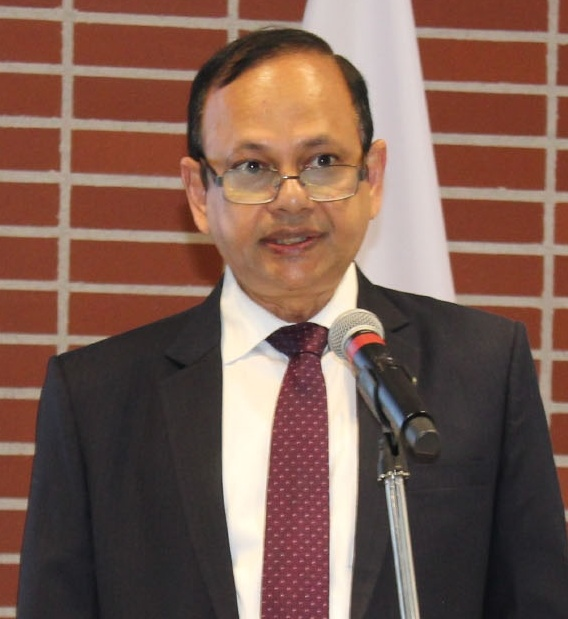
- Ali in 2026

Ambassador of Bangladesh to Japan
- Incumbent
- Assumed office 12 December 2024
- Preceded by: Shahabuddin Ahmed

Ambassador of Bangladesh to Romania
- In office 6 August 2020 – 6 December 2024
- Preceded by: Position created
- Succeeded by: Shahnaz Gazi

Personal details
- Education: University of Rajshahi

Md Daud Ali is a Bangladeshi diplomat and the incumbent ambassador of Bangladesh to Japan since December 2024.

== Early life ==
Daud Ali earned his master's in applied mathematics from the University of Rajshahi.

== Career ==
Ali started his career as a foreign service officer belonging to the 15th batch of Bangladesh Civil Service (BCS).

Ali served as Director General (Consular and Welfare) in the Ministry of Foreign Affairs until March 2020. He then served as the first ambassador of Bangladesh to Romania from August 2020 until December 2024. He served as the Consul General at Bangladesh Consulate in Kunming, China and in other capacities in Bangladesh Missions in Tokyo, Pretoria and London.
