= Kawkhali Upazila, Pirojpur =

Kawkhali কাউখালী
- Upazila
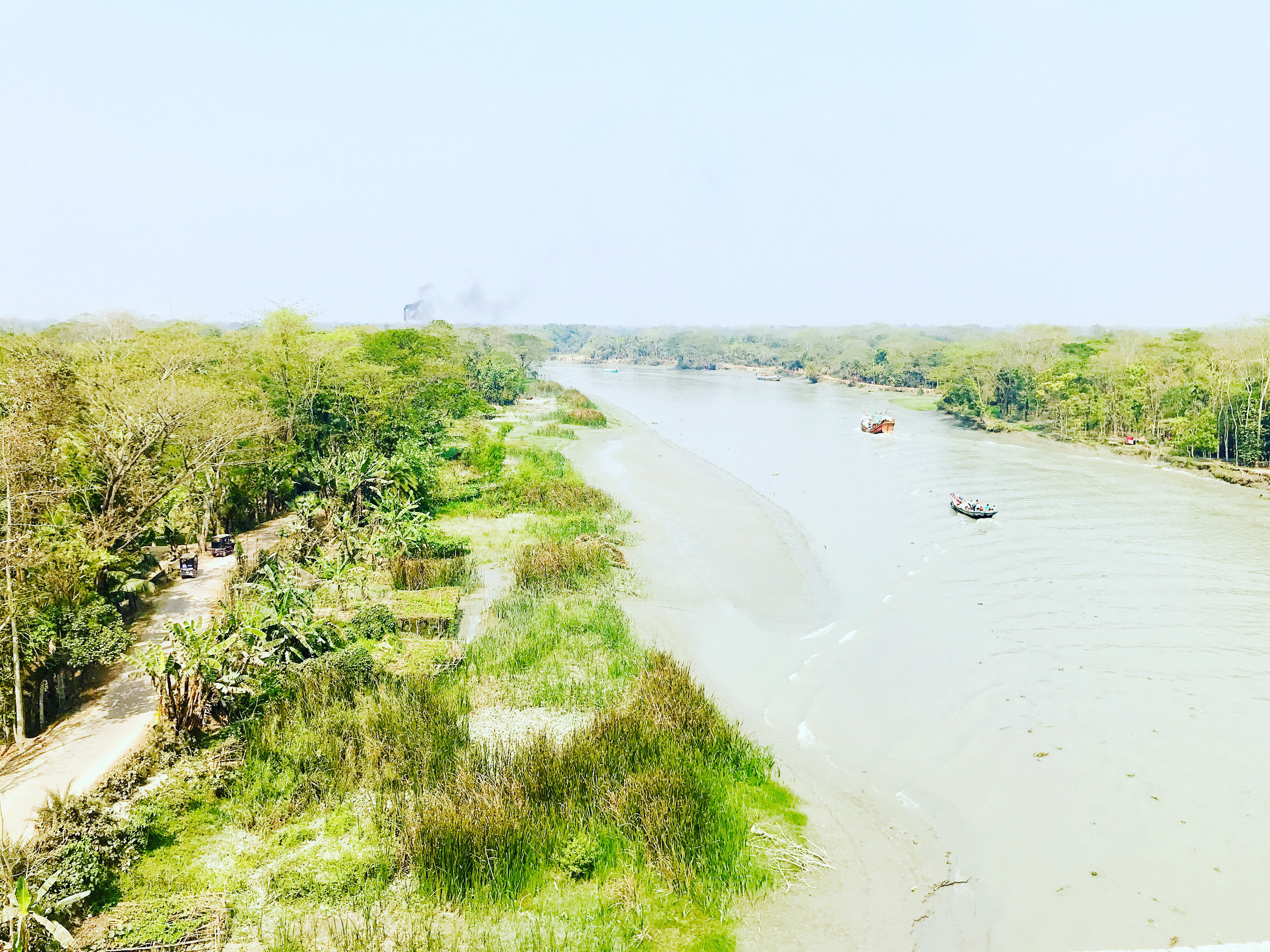
- Gabkhan river at Kawkhali upazila, Pirojpur district

- Coordinates: 22°37.2′N 90°4.2′E
- Country: Bangladesh
- Division: Barisal Division
- District: Pirojpur District

Area
  - Total: 79.56 km^{2} (30.72 sq mi)

Population (2022)
  - Total: 70,786
  - Density: 889.7/km^{2} (2,304/sq mi)
- Time zone: UTC+6 (BST)
- Postal code: 8510
- Area code: 04624
- Website: Official Map of the Kawkhali Upazila

Kawkhali (Bengali: কাউখালী) is an upazila of Pirojpur District in the Division of Barisal, Bangladesh.

== Geography ==
Kawkhali is located at 22.6203°N 90.0694°E. It has a total area of 79.56 km^{2}.

== Demographics ==
Religions in Kawkhali Upazila (2022)
Religion	Percent
Islam	86.06%
Hinduism	13.94%
Other or not stated	0.00%

According to the 2022 Bangladeshi census, Kawkhali Upazila had 18,179 households and a population of 70,786. 9.13% of the population were under 5 years of age. Kawkhali had a literacy rate (age 7 and over) of 86.92%: 87.42% for males and 86.47% for females, and a sex ratio of 93.60 males for every 100 females. 8,782 (12.41%) lived in urban areas.

According to the 2011 Census of Bangladesh, Kawkhali Upazila had 16,208 households and a population of 70,115. 14,321 inhabitants (20.43%) were under 10 years of age. Kawkhali has a literacy rate (age 7 and over) of 64.6%, compared to the national average of 51.8%, and a sex ratio of 1010 females per 1000 males. 9,641 inhabitants (13.75%) lived in urban areas.

According to the 1991 Bangladesh census, Kawkhali had a population of 70,347, of whom 37,391 were aged 18 or older. Males constituted 50.46% of the population, and females 49.54%. Kawkhali had an average literacy rate of 50.4% (7+ years), compared to the national average of 32.4%.

== Administration ==
UNO: Swajal Molla.

Kawkhali Upazila is divided into five union parishads: Amrajuri, Chirapara Parshaturia, Kawkhali, Sayna Raghunathpur, and Shial Kati. The union parishads are subdivided into 45 mauzas and 59 villages.

=== Kawkhali town ===
Kawkhali is a small town and its communication depends on rivers and roads. It has a launch and steamer station which dates from the British period. The Gabkhan Channel starts from Kawkhali near the village of Ashoa. On it many ships run from Mongla seaport to Dhaka.

== See also ==
- Upazilas of Bangladesh
- Districts of Bangladesh
- Divisions of Bangladesh
