= Gabkhan Channel =

Canal in Bangladesh

Coordinates: 22.66974°N 90.12781°E

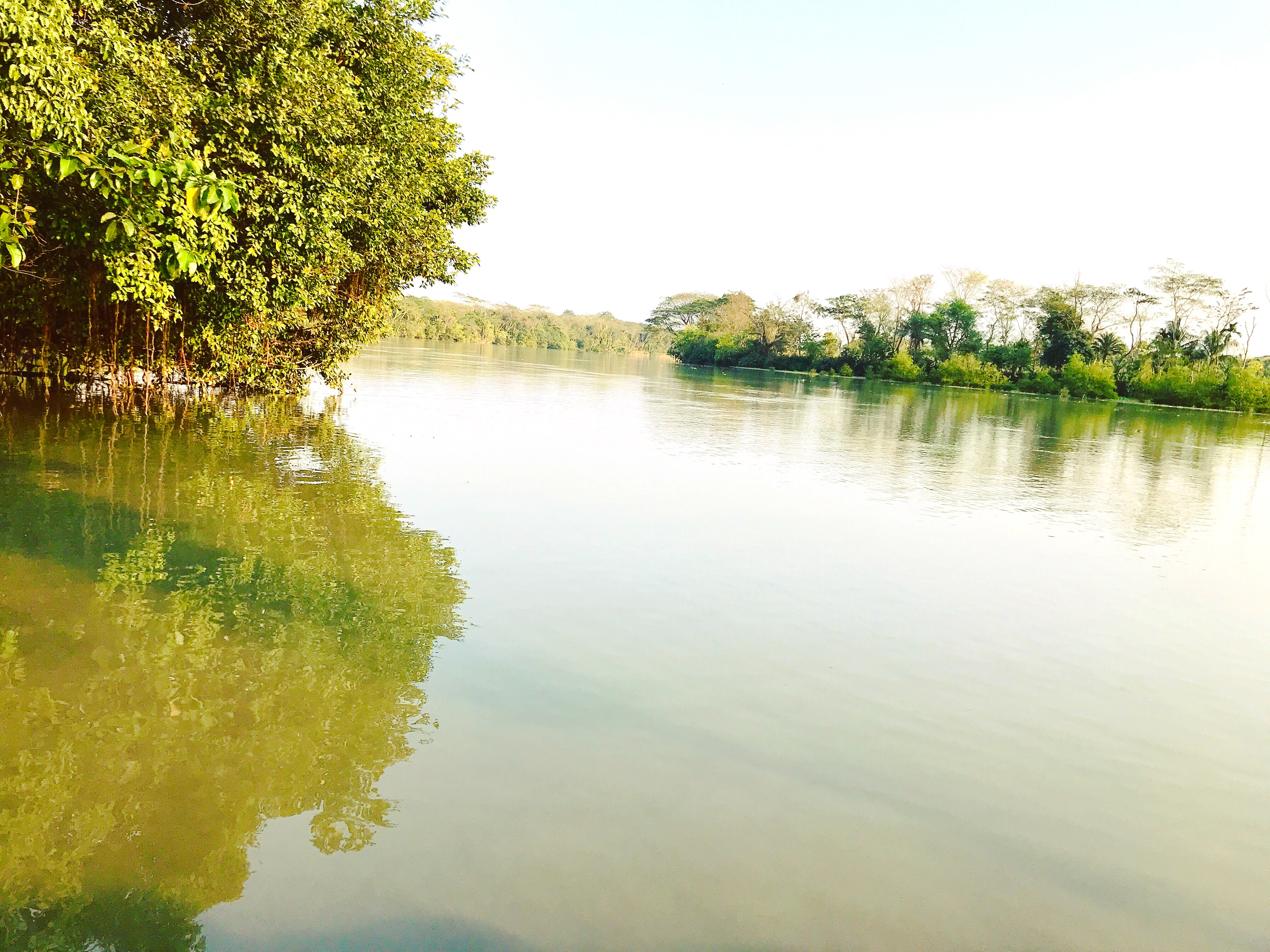
Gabkhan Channel

Gabkhan Channel is a canal connecting Pirojpur District of Bangladesh with Jhalakati District. The 18-kilometer long canal, the country's only man-made naval route, was excavated during the British rule in 1918 to connect the Sandha River of Pirojpur district and the Sugandha River of Jhalakati district, reducing the distance on the Dhaka-Mongla and Chittagong-Mongla river routes by about 118 kilometres (73 mi).

The channel is known as the Suez Canal of Bangladesh, starting from Kawkhali near the village of Ashoa.
