= Nikunja Behari Maiti =

Indian independence activist and former Member of Parliament

- Born: 26 September 1892; Midnapore district, Bengal Presidency, British India
- Died: 19 May 1970 (aged 77); Calcutta, West Bengal, India
- Citizenship: British subject (1892-1947); Indian (1947-1970)
- Education: Contai High School
- Alma mater: Krishnath College, University of Calcutta
- Movement: Indian Freedom Movement
- Spouse: Ahalya Maiti
- Children: Abha Maiti
- Parent(s): Biswanath Maiti (father); Savitri Debi (mother)

Nikunja Behari Maiti (26 September 1892 – 19 May 1970) was an Indian independence activist and the first Education Minister of West Bengal. He was a member of the 2nd Lok Sabha and represented the Ghatal constituency. He was known as Master Mashai. He was born in Kalagachia village of Khejuri police station under Midnapore district. His wife Ahalya Debi was a Satyagrahi and his daughter Abha Maiti was a politician and Union Minister of State for Industries.

== Early life ==
Nikunja Behari Maiti was born in Kelagachia village of Khejuri, Purba Medinipur district to Biswanath Maiti and Savitri Debi in a Bengali Hindu Mahishya family. The whole family, the Maitis of Kelagachia were involved in the Indian independence movement. He passed his entrance examination from the esteemed Contai High School and then proceeded to the famed Krishnath College of Berhampore of West Bengal for his B.A. and then to the University of Calcutta for his M.A in English.

== Career ==
Nikunja Bihari Maiti's patriotism originated from his father Bishwanath Maiti's patriotism. He dedicated himself to the cause of the country by working for the flood and cholera victims in the Khejuri-Bhagwanpur region. Bipin Bihari Gayan and Padmalochana Sahu were his companions in this work. He left his job in 1921 due to Gandhiji's Non-Cooperation Movement. At that time, Birendranath Sasmal, left his barristership and established the country's first national college, Kalagachia National College, in Kalagachia, where Nikunja Behari served as the headmaster. He then wholeheartedly joined the nationalist movement. He was even jailed for joining the strike against the arrival of the Prince Edward's visit to Calcutta. After completing his imprisonment, he led the regions local congress leadership under Gandhiji's command for the elimination of untouchability and other constructive works. He won the local board elections in 1925. The work of bricklaying on the Kanthi-Belda and Kalinagar-Kanthi roads began. He joined the relief work in the Midnapore floods of 1923 and '26. Established a girls' school in Kamdevnagar. In 1929, he resigned from the local and district boards as per the proposal of the Lahore session of Congress. He was appointed headmaster at Diamond Harbour. He was again imprisoned in 1930 for participating in the Salt Satyagraha. In 1933, he was imprisoned again for celebrating Independence Day. In 1934, he became the headmaster of Fatehpur Srinath Institution in South 24 Parganas district. In 1940, he was imprisoned for personal satyagraha. In the 1937 elections, under the India Act of 1935, he was elected to the Legislative Assembly from the combined constituencies of Khejuri Bhagwanpur and Patashpur. After independence, he joined the First Ghosh cabinet of West Bengal as the first education minister. In 1955, he was elected President of the District Congress. After being a member of the Lok Sabha from 1957-62, he became a member of the Rajya Sabha for the next five years.
