= Bipin Bihari Sasmal =

Bengali landlord and Politician (1873–1941)

Rai Sahib Bipin Bihari Sasmal
- বিপিন বিহারী শাসমল
- Born: Bipin Bihari Sasmal; April 1873; Chandiveti, Contai, Midnapore district, Bengal Presidency
- Died: July 1941 (aged 68); Contai, Midnapore district, Bengal Presidency
- Education: Contai High School
- Occupations: Zamindar, politician
- Spouse: Shantashila Debi
- Relatives: Birendranath Sasmal (brother)
- Honours: Rai Sahib (1912)

Babu Bipin Bihari Sasmal, Rai Sahib (also written as Bepin Behari Sasmal) (April 1873 – July 1941) was a Bengali Politician, social worker, educationist and a distinguished Zamindar. He significantly contributed to the growth of education in Purba Medinipur, by founding many educational institutions and he was also involved in many other social works for the welfare of the people. He was the elder brother of Birendranath Sasmal, one of the foremost nationalist leaders of Bengal Presidency during the Indian independence movement.

== Early life ==
Sasmal was born at Chandiveti village, near Contai in Midnapore district in Bengal Presidency. He was born into a prominent land-owning (zamindar) Mahishya family to Zamindar Biswambar Sasmal and Anandamoyee Debi. He was their eldest child, his brothers being Deshapran Birendranath Sasmal and Jogendranath Sasmal. The Sasmal family of Chandiveti had been intrinsically involved with the Indian independence movement, being one of the major landed families, was among the earliest educated families of Purba Medinipur district. He completed his studies from the Contai High School. After graduation, he was initiated into Brahmoism by his teacher, and the Acharya of the Brahmo Samaj of Contai, Tarak Gopal Ghosh. He became a local leader of the Brahmo Movement in Midnapore district, and spearheaded many social works under aegis of the movement in the district.

== Career ==
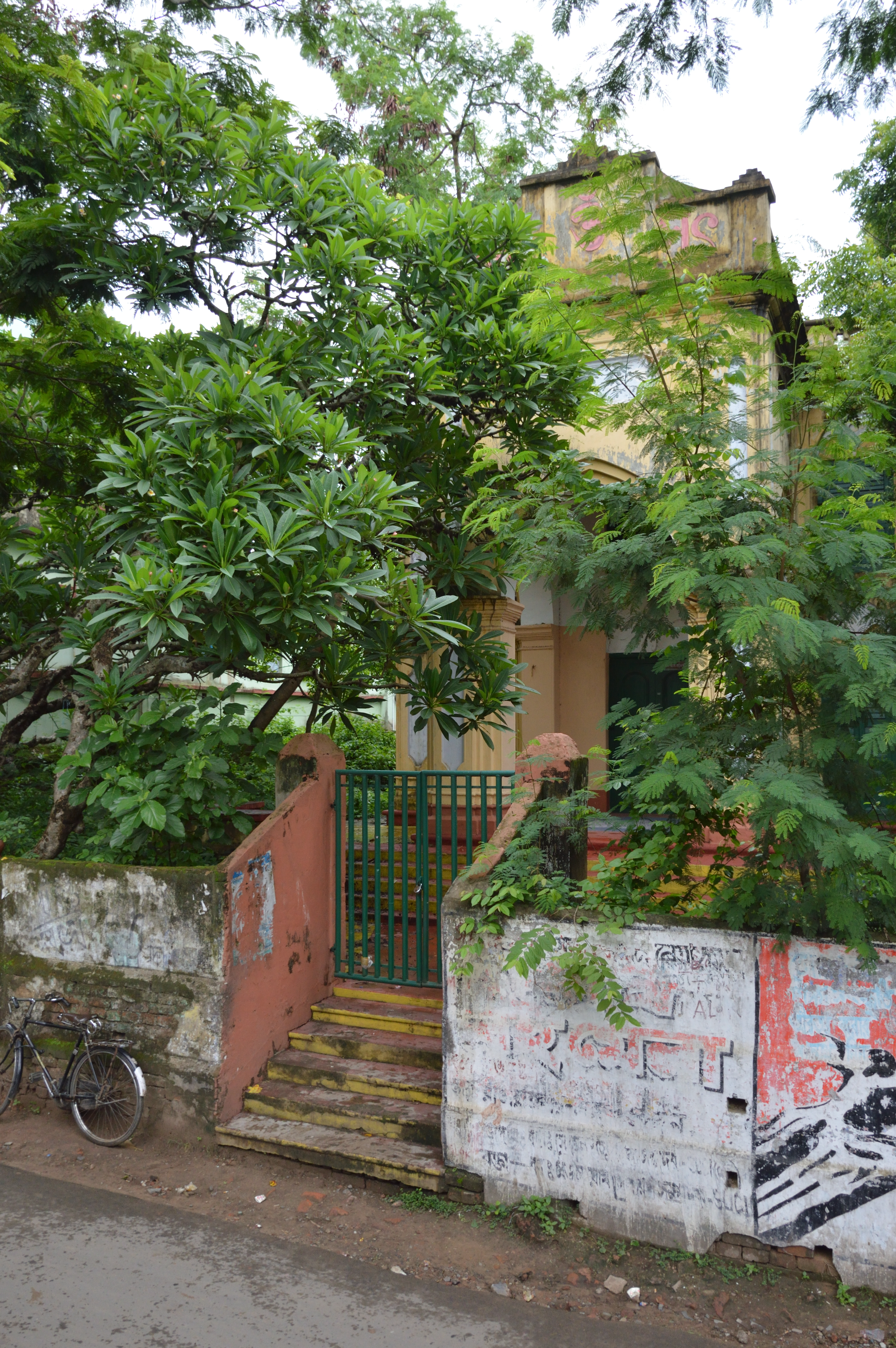
The office of the Brahmo Samaj at Contai built in 1886, where he served as President.

He owned large zamindaris at Birkul near Contai, and also in Kolaghat and in Egra and various other places in the district. He was a modern and enlightened man, he specifically insisted on sending his brother to England to study for the Bar and also, helped gather the requisite funds to do so. As a result, Birendranath Sasmal became the first person from the district, as well as the first member of the caste to go abroad to read law. He had substantial contribution in various social works in his district. He played a significant role in setting up of multiple educational institutions in the Purba Medinipur district. In 1883, along with Madhusudan Jana and others he founded the Contai Model Institution and 1909, he being a prominent member of the Brahmo Samaj set up the Contai Chandramani Brahmo Girls' School. In the National School movement, initiated by his brother Birendranath Sasmal, he took a leading role in the foundation of the Henria Shivaprasad Institution and Bahiri Bradley Birt High School, two "National Schools" near Contai and also, Mugberia Gangadhar High School in Mugberia village, in Bhagabanpur. He also helped another Zamindar and a fellow member of the Brahmo Samaj, Biswambar Dinda in setting up of the Prabhat Kumar College in memory of his late son. The college bring the oldest college in Purba Medinipur district. He became the first president of the college after its foundation in 1926. He was elected to be the first Chairman of the Contai Union Committee and also the Chairman of the Contai Local Board. He arranged for Dhangar cleaning staff to be brought from Ganjam district in Odisha and settled then in the city of Contai. He narrowly missed the winning margin for the Midnapore South Constituency in 1920. He was one of the most prominent and influential people of Midnapore district, he was made an honorary Marriage Registrar in 1907 and an Honorary Magistrate of the Contai subdivision in 1908. The British Raj also, further honoured him with the title of Rai Sahib for his social works and other contributions in 1912.

== Death ==
Sasmal died in July, 1941 at Contai, Bengal Presidency, British India. His legacy continues to live through the numerous works he carried out in the district and especially in Contai for the people.

== Family tree ==
Babu Karunakar Sasmal
  - Chandi Charan Sasmal
    - Ramdhan Sasmal
    - Biswambhar Sasmal
      - Bipin Bihari Sasmal, m. Shantashila Debi
      - Birendranath Sasmal, m. Hemanta Kumari Debi
      - Jogendranath Sasmal, m. Sarala Debi
    - Kashinath
    - Bholanath
  - Baidyanath

== Gallery ==
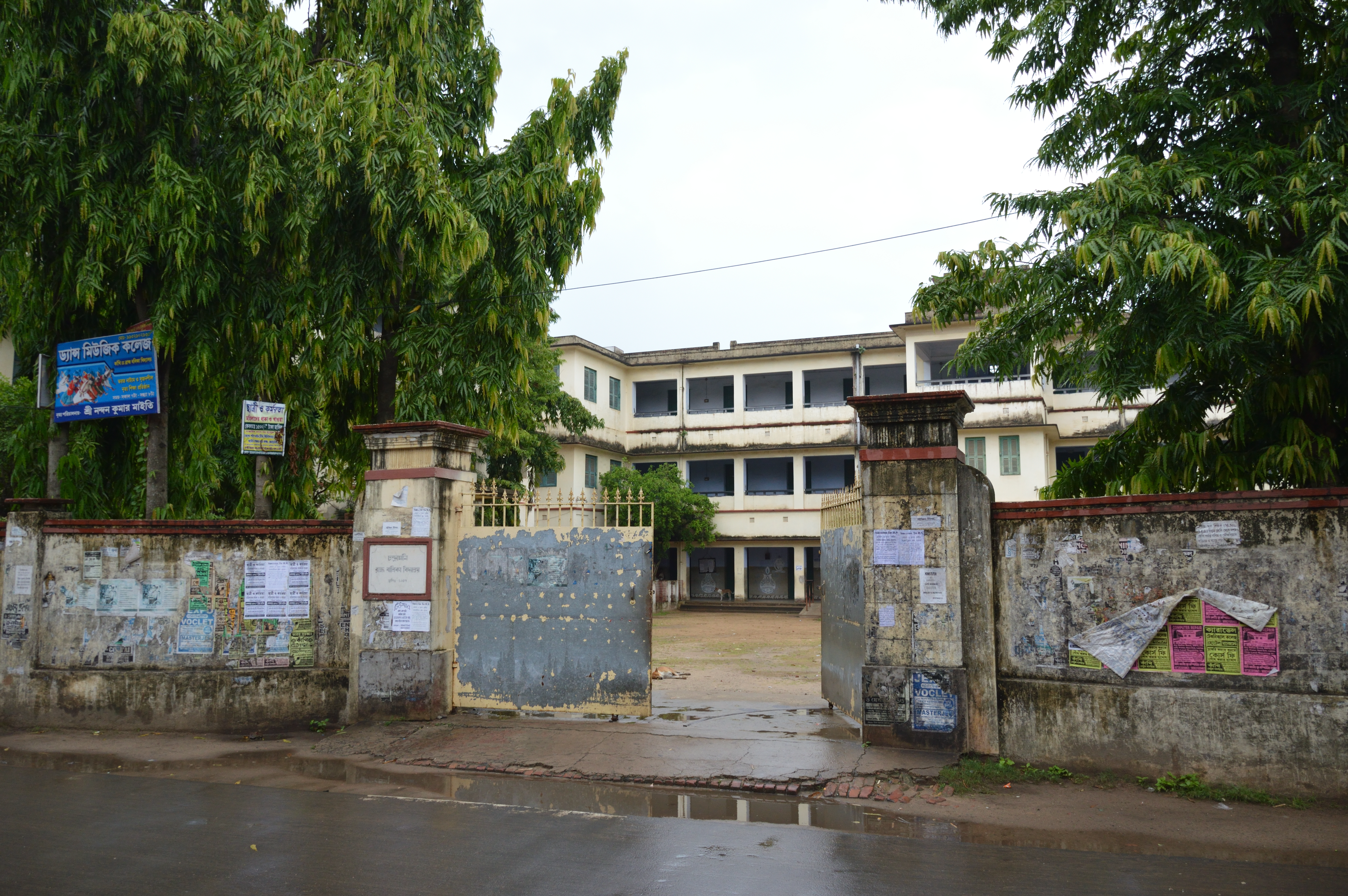
Chandramoni Brahmo Balika Vidyalaya, Contai

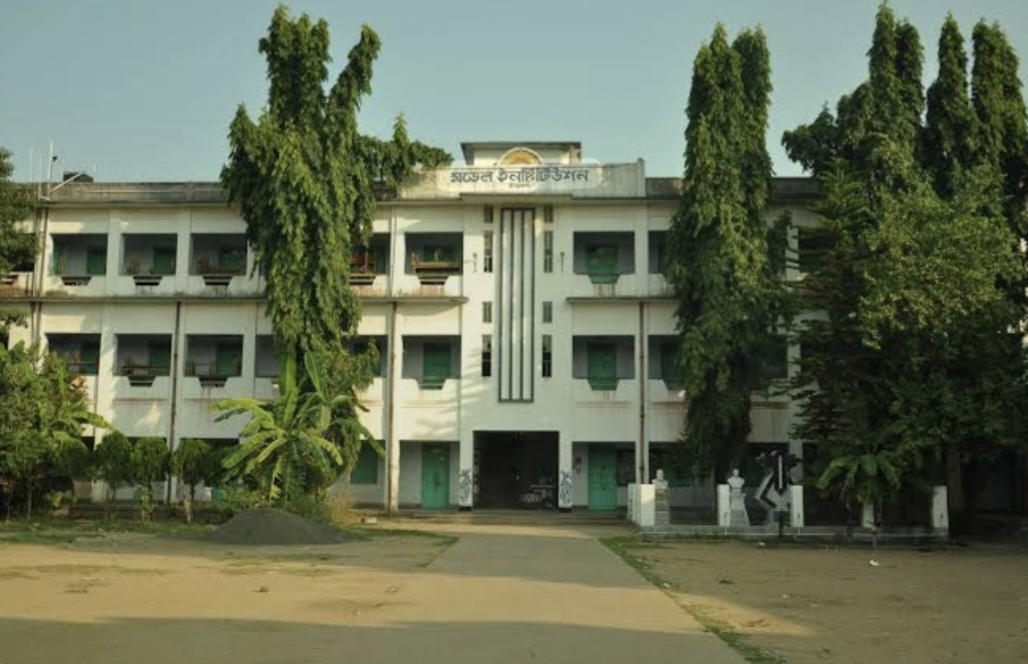
Contai Model Institution at Contai, Midnapore. One of the institution that he had helped set up.

Brahmo Samaj office building, Contai

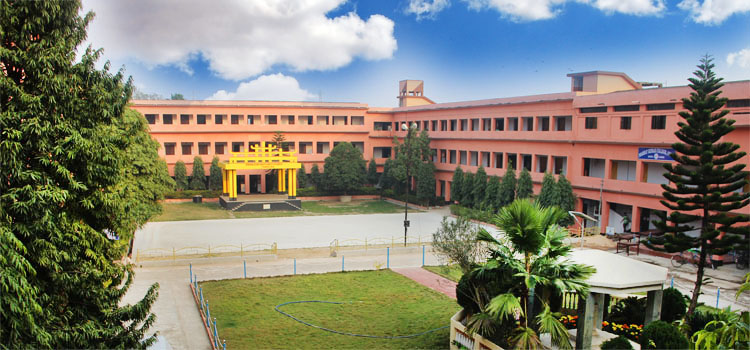
Prabhat Kumar College, Contai
