= Madhusudan Jana =

Bengali doctor, journalist and social worker (1857–1938)

Acharya Madhusudan Jana (also written as Madhusudhan Jana) (26 September 1857- 21 October 1938) was a Bengali journalist, doctor, teacher and Social Worker. He was the founder of the famous Nihar Press in Contai.

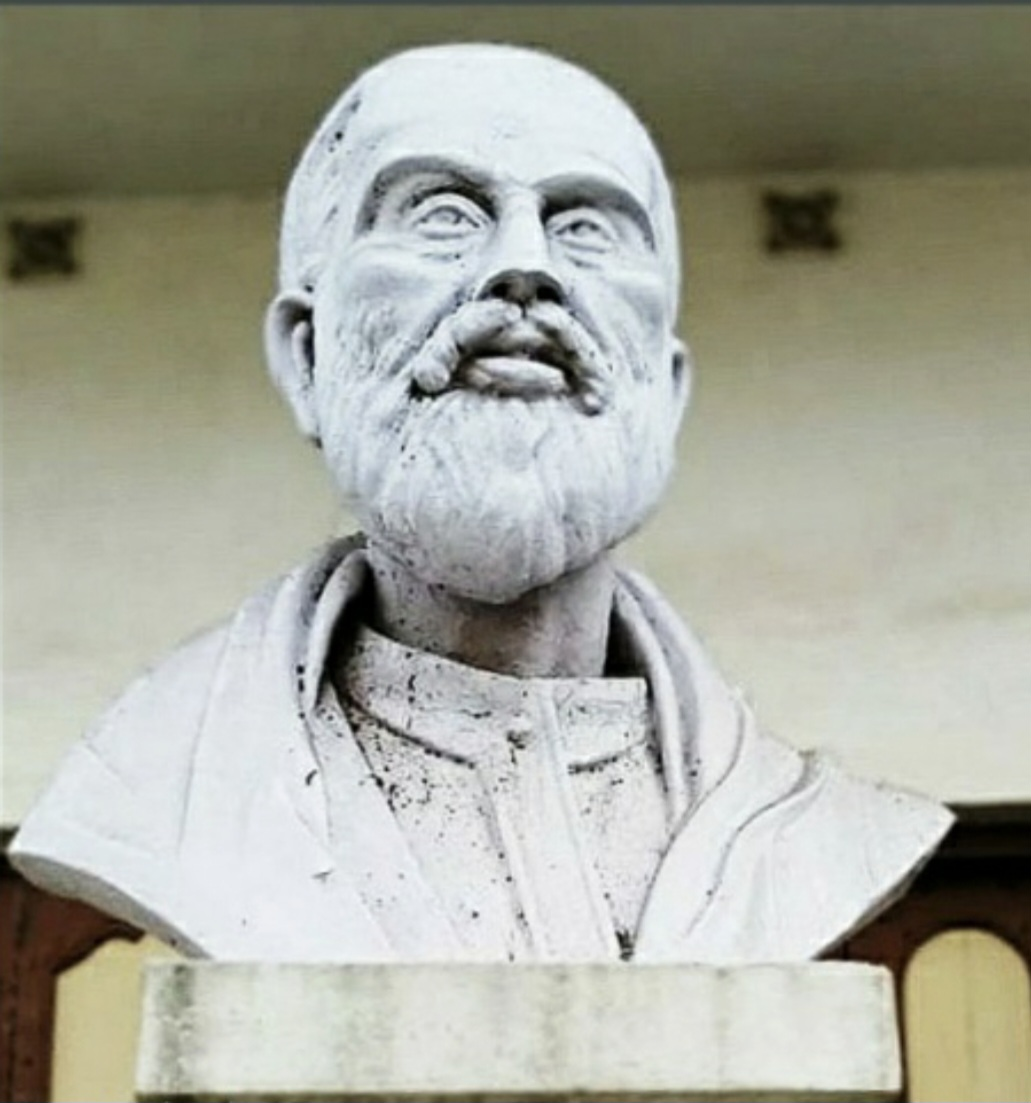
Bust of Madhusudan Jana, at Contai, Midnapore.

== Early life ==
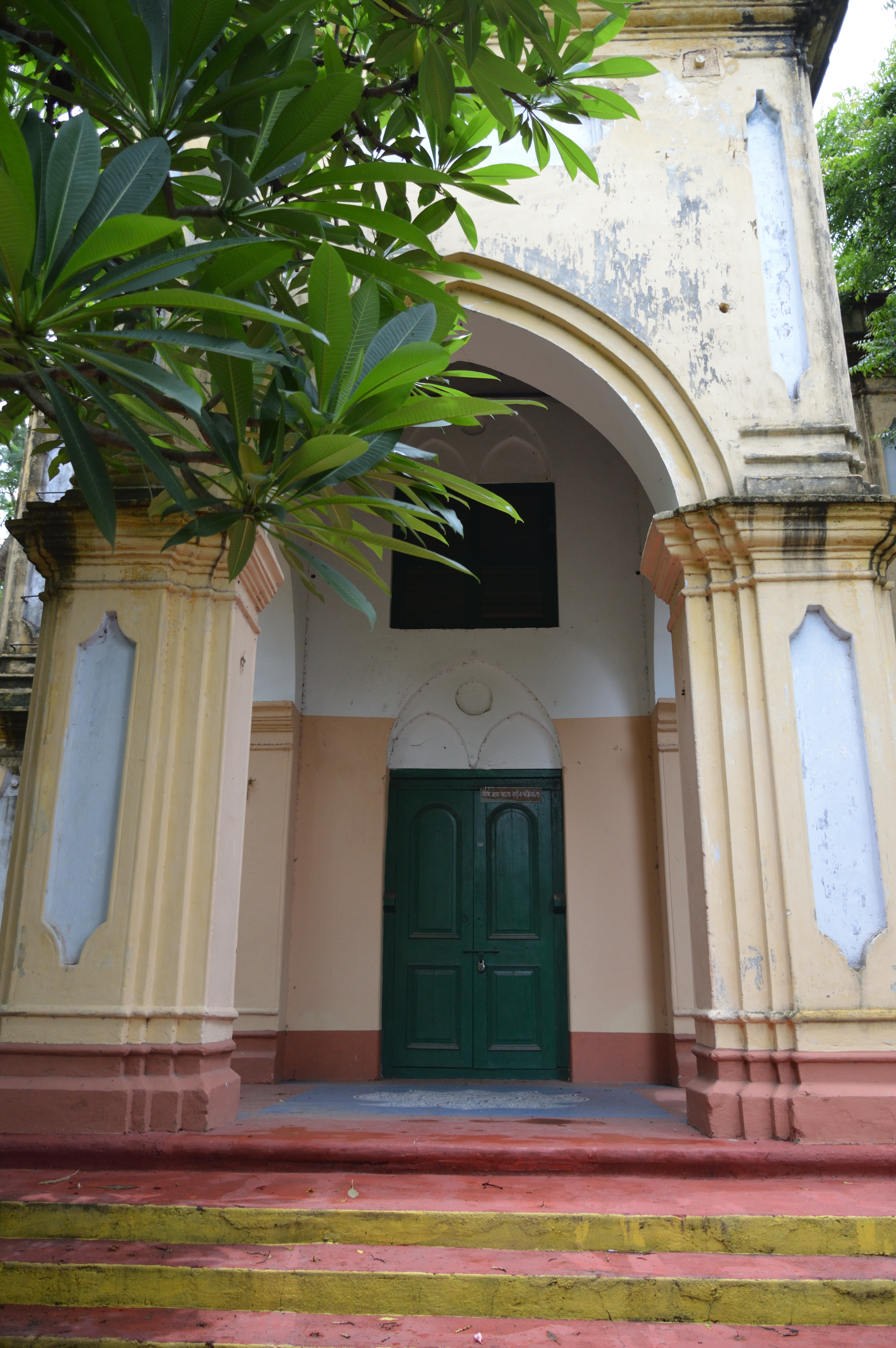
The building of the Brahmo Samaj at Contai

Madhusudan Jana was born on 26 September 1857 at Birulia village in Nandigram, Midnapore district, Bengal Presidency, in a Brahmo Mahishya family to Narasimha Jana and Bidyabati Debi. His grandfather had converted to Brahmoism as a result of the influence of Ram Mohan Roy. The family later migrated south to Contai, where Madhusudan attended the newly founded Contai High School, being a graduate of one of its first batches. He stood first in his class. Subsequently, he took admission into the Midnapore College.

== Career ==
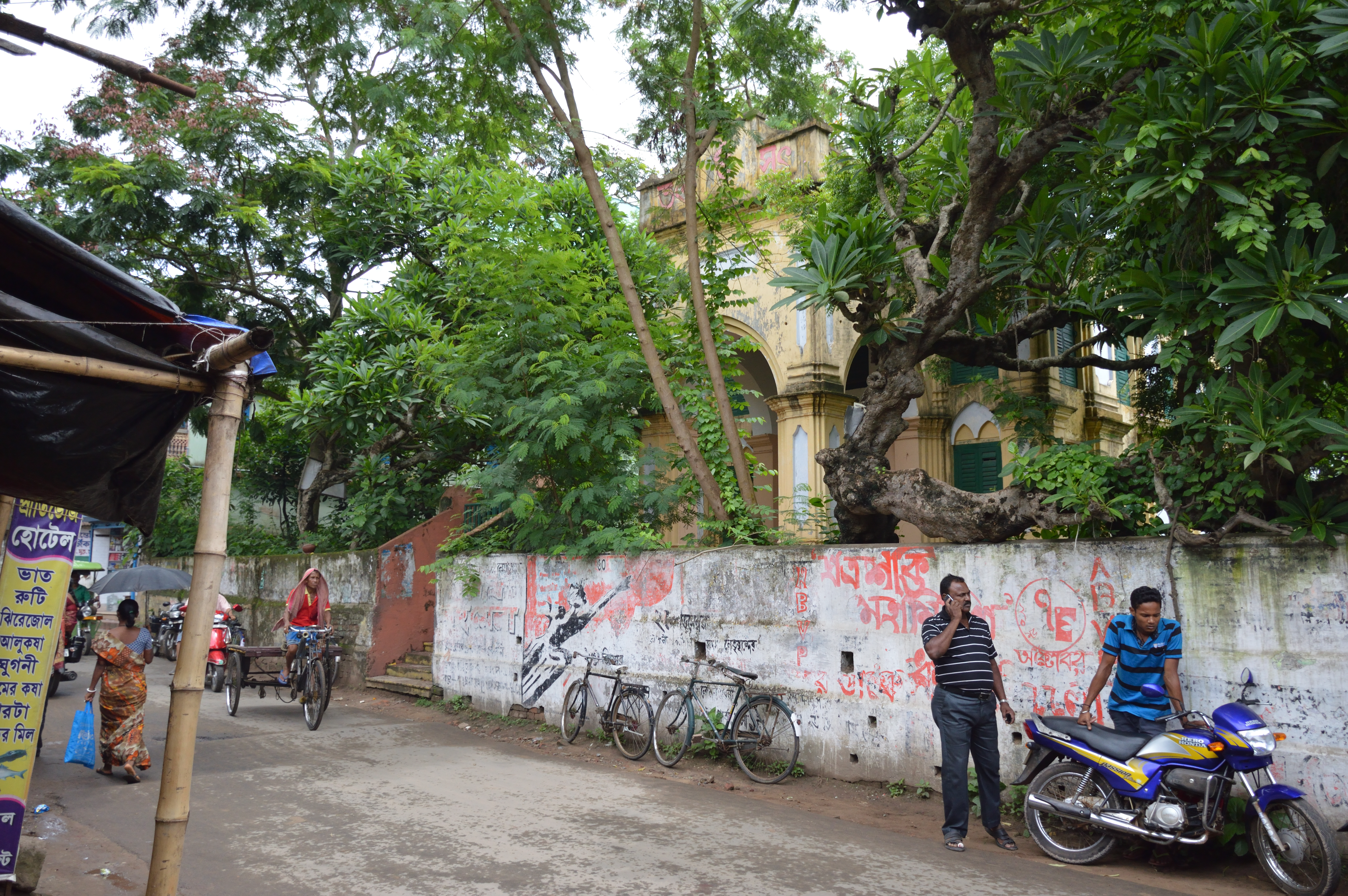
The office of the Brahmo Samaj at Contai

Following his education he began to thoroughly study Homeopathy because he was deeply affected by the scarcity of Doctors in the rural areas of Midnapore, and the countless medical hurdles that the rural population had to face due to a combination of both, the lack of financial means to afford medical care as well as a lack of medical practitioners. Gradually his fame as doctor spread throughout Midnapore district as well as outside. He specialised in diseases affecting to rural populace in those days such as Cholera, Smallpox etc. He came to be called "Iswar" by the people because of the free of cost treatment that he rendered to the sick.

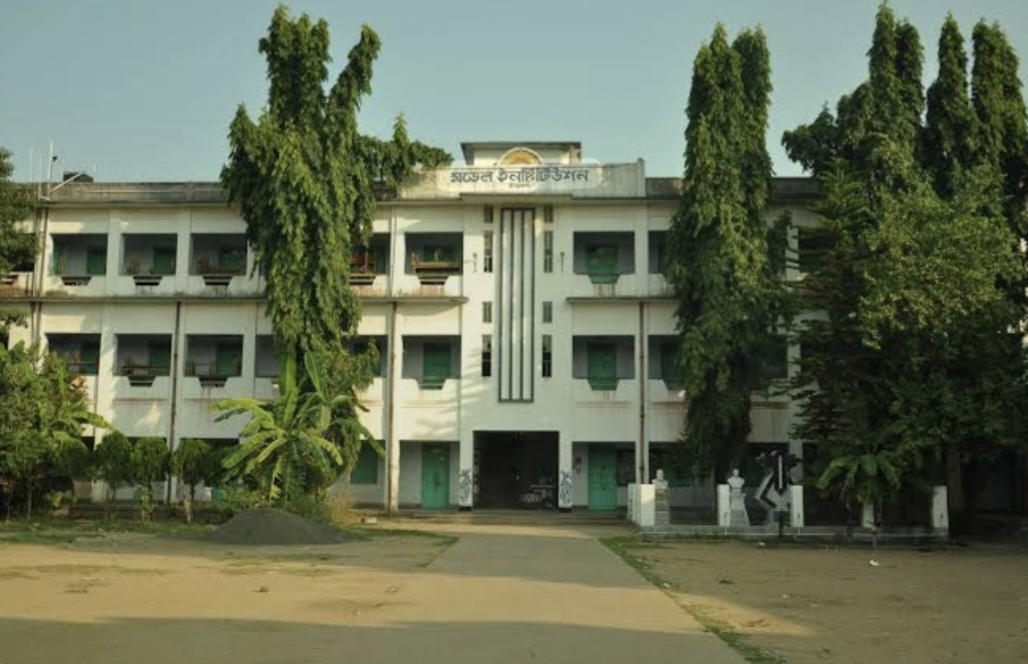
Contai Model Institution at Contai, Midnapore. One of the oldest institutions of Medinipur established in 1883, by Babu Madhusudan Jana, Padmalochan Panda and others.

He was also one of the foremost in spreading education across the district. He was instrumental for establishing many schools in Contai. He was the founder and the first Headmaster of the Contai Model Institution, the second school established in Contai in 1883. This school went on to become a later model for the "National Schools", established by Deshapran Birendranath Sasmal all across the Midnapore district. On behalf of the Brahmo Samaj, he along with Rai Sahib Bipin Bihari Sasmal and others established the Contai Chandramani Brahmo Girls' School in the year 1909. He was also involved in the foundation of the Contai Club, an anti British, club only for Indian members at Contai.

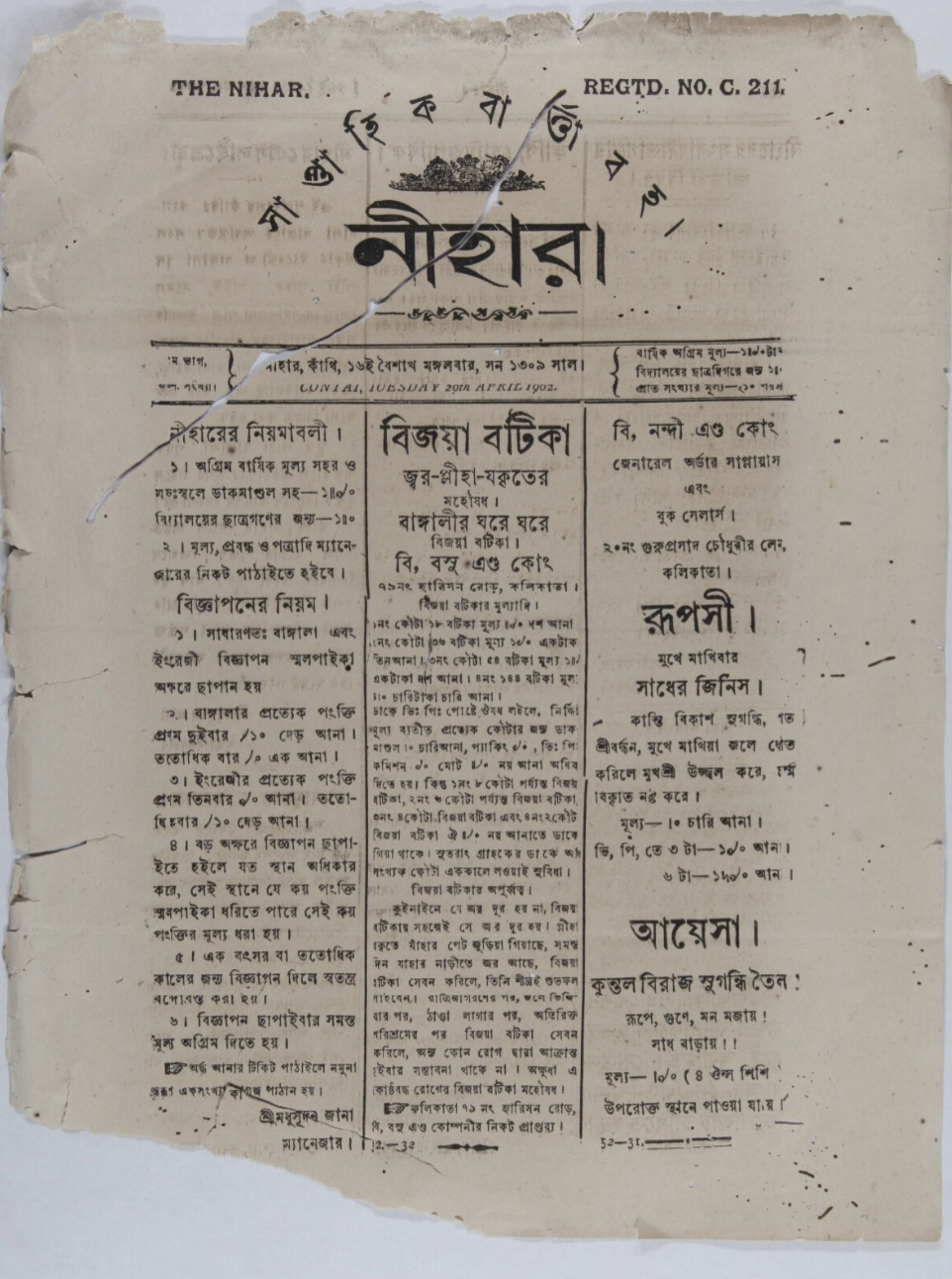
Issue 33 of Nihar newspaper of Madhusudan Jana in Contai, Medinipore published in 1901.

Apart from his contributions in the fields of Medicine and Education, his most notable work was the foundation of the Nihar Press, in 1895, being one of the oldest presses of the district and its flagship newspaper Nihar Patrika. Published from 17 August 1901, its newspaper Nihar Patrika, became one of the most prolific of the newspapers of Midnapore district during the British Raj and the principal mouthpiece of the Indian independence movement at Midnapore district. The newspaper's fearless and harsh criticism of the Bengal Partition of 1905 drew huge acclaim throughout the country. Nihar Patrika was acclaimed throughout Bengal Presidency during the Indian freedom struggle for its fearless journalism and accurate reasoned arguments. Apart from the writings in the nationalist newspaper, Jana also translated Jagannatha Dasa's Bhagabata the famous Odia text into Bengali language. He was made an Honorary Magistrate by the Government for his social works and other contributions. He was also honoured with the title of Acharya by the Brahmo Samaj and the sobriquet of "Vidyabinode" by the Pandits of Nabadwip Biswajanin Bidyatsabha of Nabadwip.

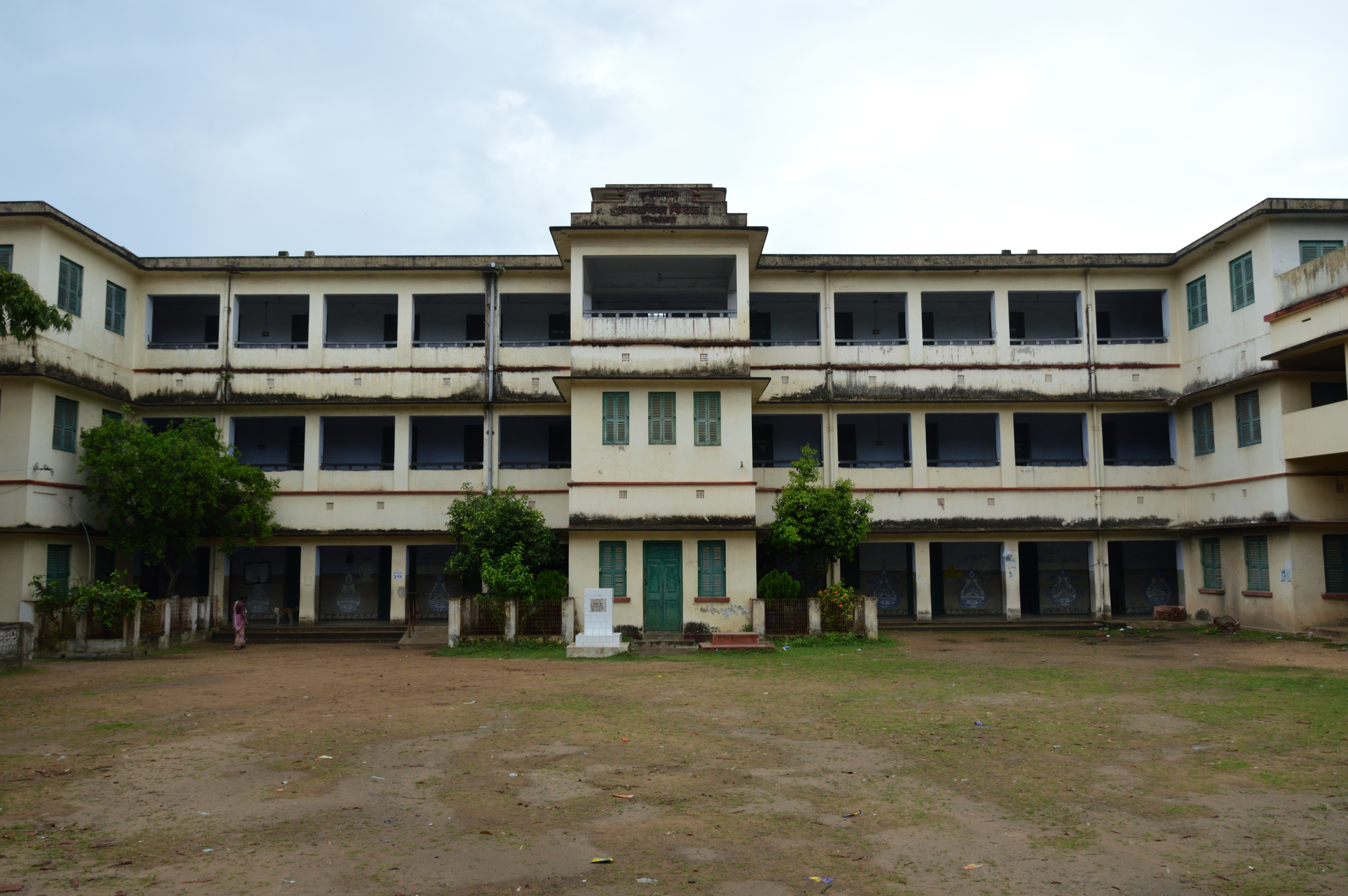
Contai Chandramani Brahmo Girls' School, founded by Madhusudhan Jana, Rai Sahib Bipin Bihari Sasmal and others in 1909.

== Death ==
He died in 21 October 1938 at his house in Contai. A street, "Madhusudhan Jana Sarani" has been named aftet him at Contai. After his death, his son, Jatindra Nath Jana, also a teacher, continued his legacy through the publications of the Nihar Press. The newspapers ran till 1989 through the editorship of his grandson, Nitindranath Jana, the newspaper was published from the family's house built by Madhusudhan Jana at Contai.

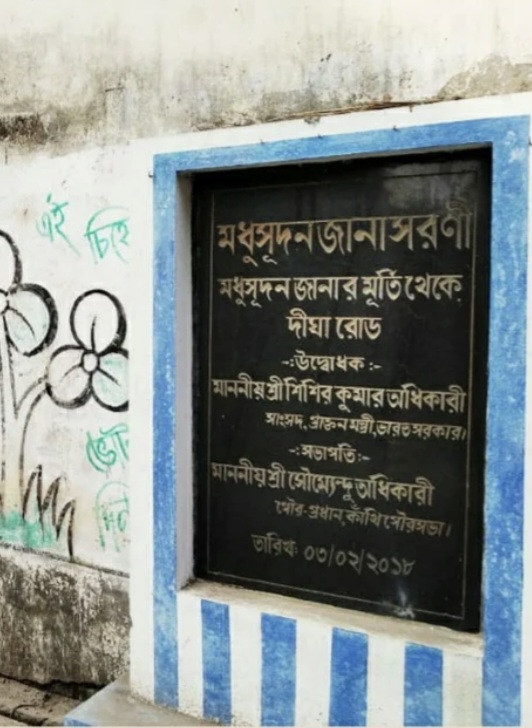
Plaque installed in Madhusudan Jana Sarani, Contai.
