= Contai High School =

Educational institution in India

Coordinates: 21.7787°N 87.7550°E

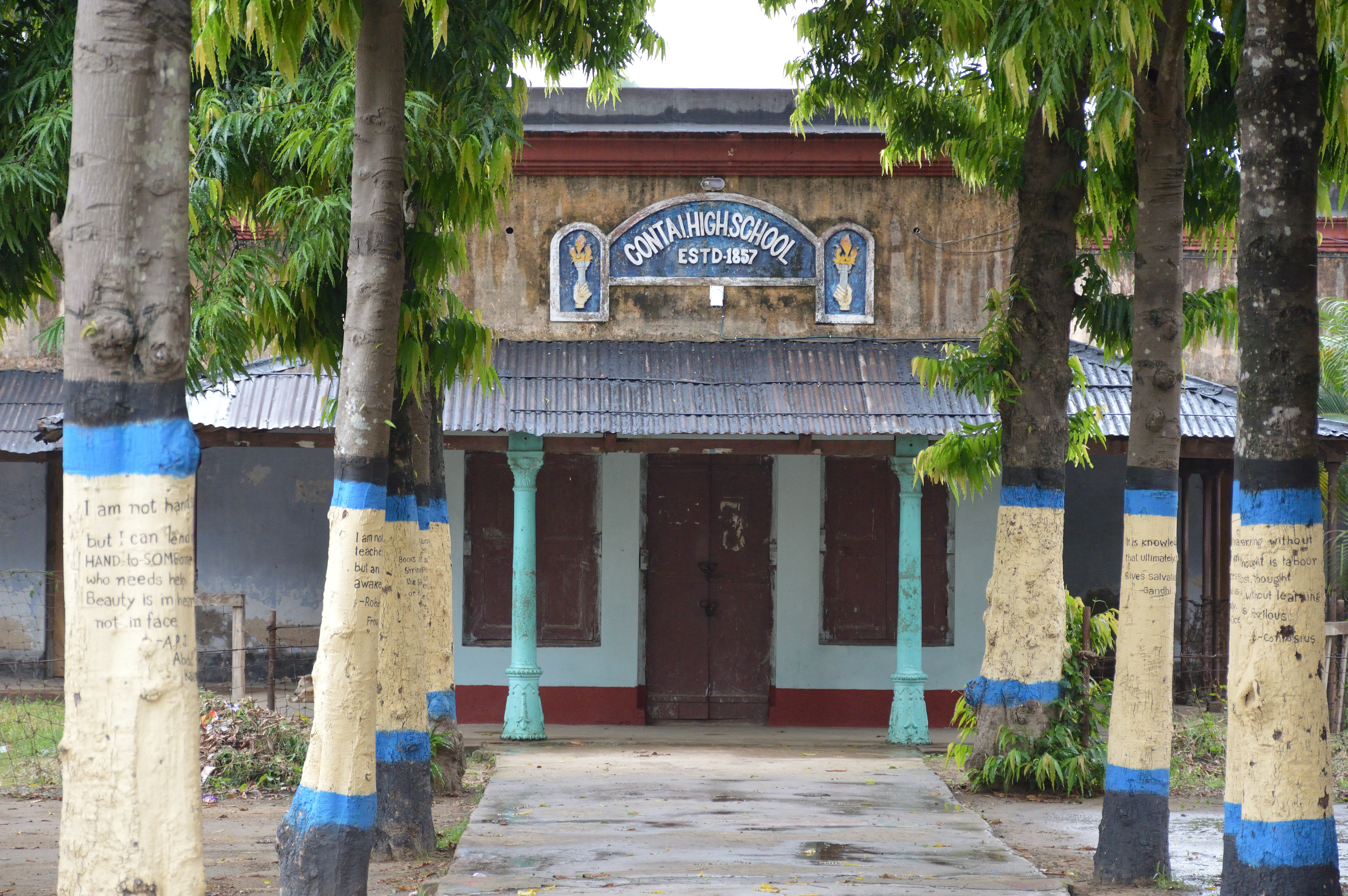

Contai High School is the oldest school (established in 1857) in the sub-divisional town of Contai, Purba Medinipur, West Bengal, India. It is one the most respected schools in Midnapore district. It is a boys' higher secondary school featuring both English and Bengali medium.

The school premises including the buildings, hostel, gymnasium, lab, gardens and playground lie on land provided by Rishi Bankim Chandra Chattopadhyay during his stay at Contai. The school follows the course curricula of West Bengal Board of Secondary Education and West Bengal Council of Higher Secondary Education for standard 10th and 12th board examinations respectively.

== History ==
It is one of the oldest schools in Midnapore district, being established in the year 1857. It enjoyed considerable development when Bankim Chandra Chatterjee was the Deputy Magistrate of the Midnapore district. He was instrumental for the improvement of the school. It still holds immense respect and prestige in the eyes of the people of Contai.

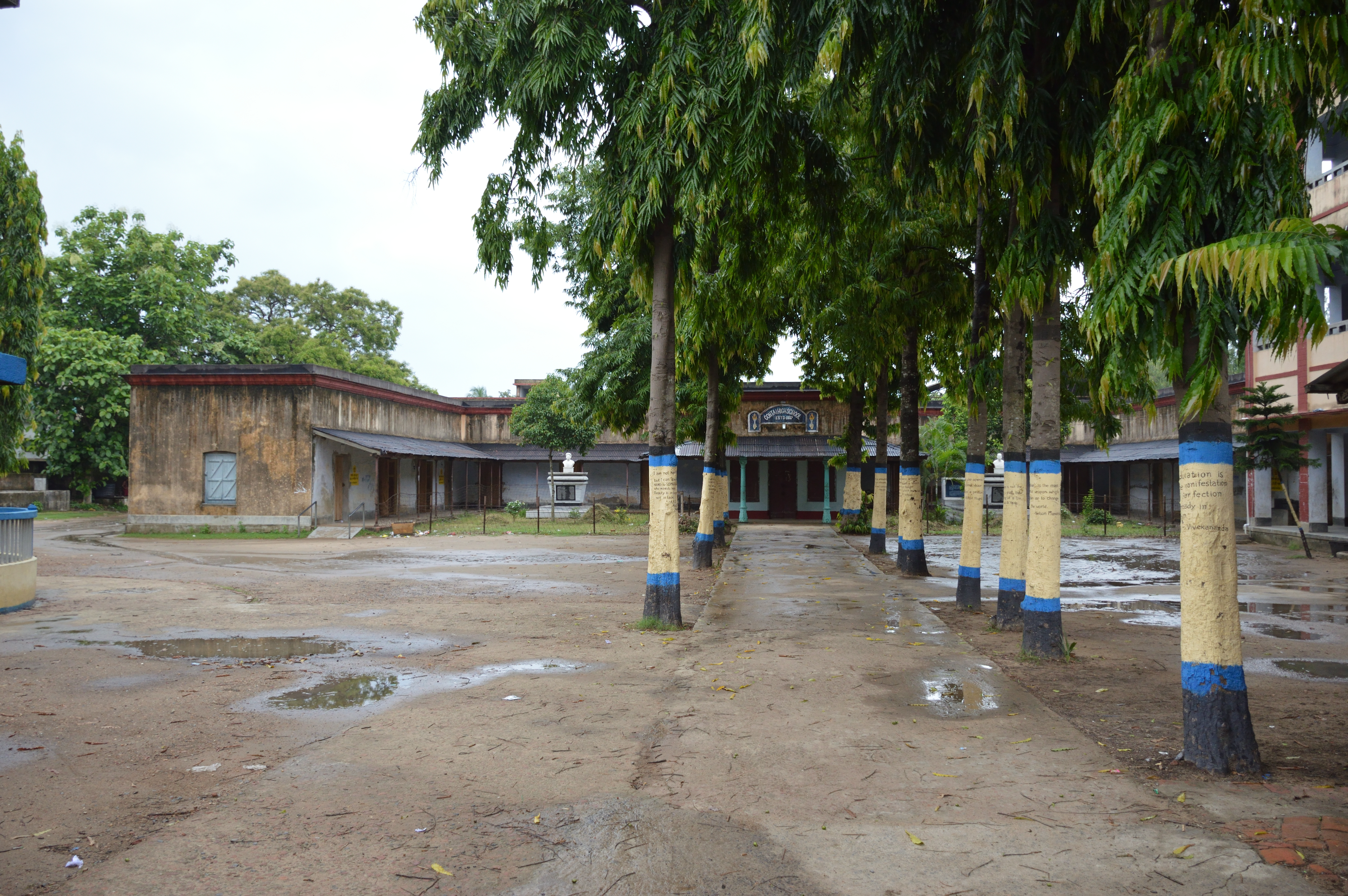
Another side

== Facilities ==
- It has a Primary Section: (Class I – IV)
- Secondary (Class V – X) and Higher Secondary (Class XI – XII) Sections have both Bengali and English Medium simultaneously. Both mediums are under WBBSE and WBCHSE board.
- Contai High School features Atal Tinkering Lab, which is a miniature form of scientific laboratories.
- Classes and instructors are available for computer education and statistics (for class XI-XII).

== Notable alumni ==
- Birendranath Sasmal, one of the greatest freedom fighters, nationalist barrister, popularly known as Deshapran
- Madhusudan Jana, Doctor, social worker, Founder and first headmaster of the Contai Model Institution, founder of Nihar Press, popularly called Iswar by the people of Contai
- Basanta Kumar Das, independence activist, politician, member of the Constituent Assembly of India
- Nikunja Behari Maiti, independence activist, politician, first Education Minister of West Bengal
- Rai Saheb Bipin Bihari Sasmal, politician, Zamindar, Chairman of the Contai Municipal Board, elder brother of Deshapran
