= Birendranath Sasmal =

Indian politician and nationalist barrister (1881–1934)

Deshapran Birendranath Sasmal
- দেশপ্রাণ বীরেন্দ্রনাথ শাসমল
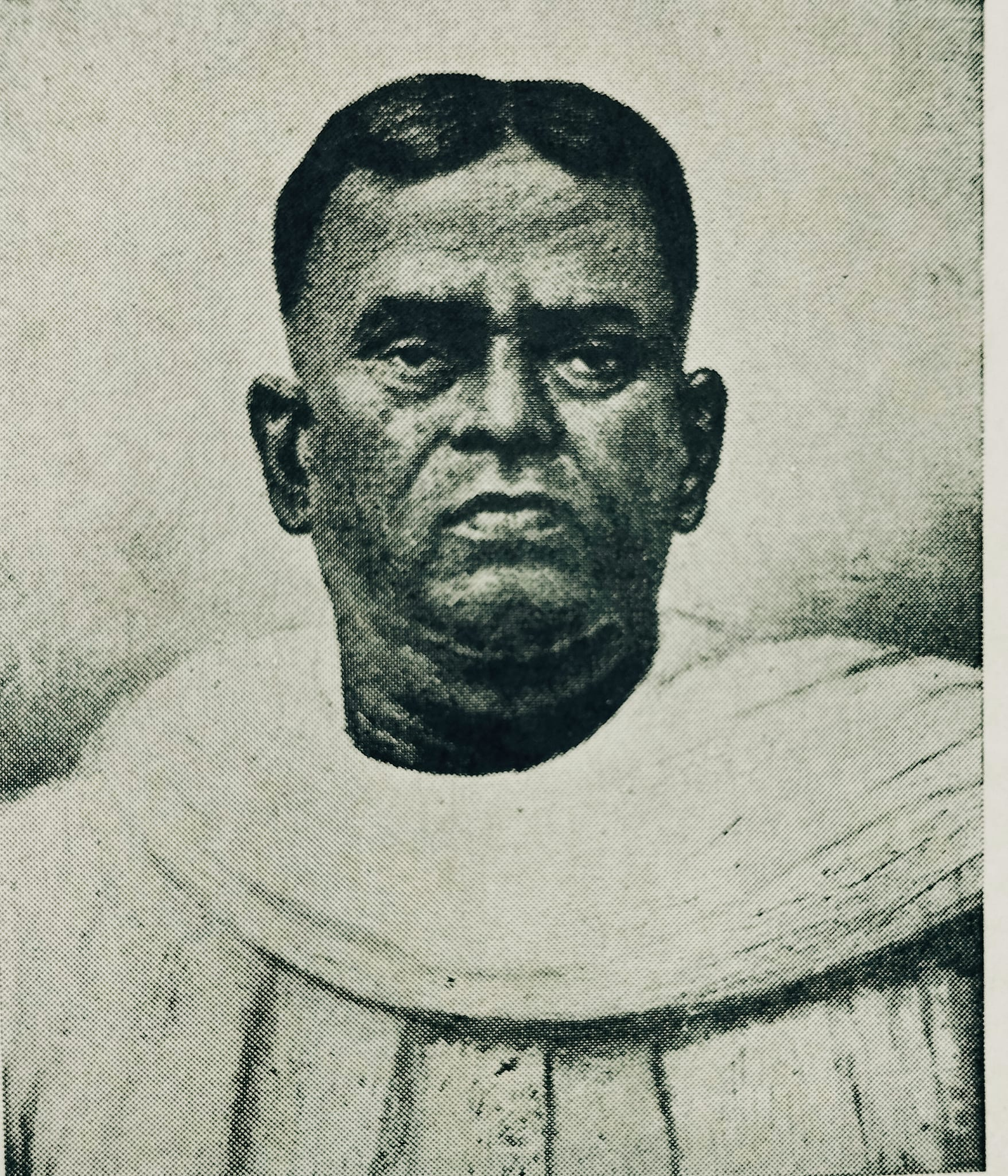
- Born: 26 October 1881; Chandiveti, Contai, Midnapore District, Bengal Presidency, British India
- Died: 24 November 1934 (aged 53); Calcutta, Bengal Presidency, British India
- Other names: Deshapran, The Uncrowned King of Medinipur
- Education: Contai High School, Surendranath College
- Alma mater: Middle Temple
- Occupations: Barrister; Politician; freedom fighter; educationist
- Organizations: Indian National Congress (Before 1923 and again after 1928); Swaraj Party (1923–1928)
- Movement: Indian independence movement
- Spouse: Hemanta Kumari Debi
- Children: 2, including Dr. Bimalananda Sasmal, Bar-at-law
- Relatives: Rai Sahib Bipin Bihari Sasmal (brother) Notendranath Sasmal, Bar-at-law (nephew)
- Family: Zamindar Sasmal Family of Chandibheti

Birendranath Sasmal (26 October 1881 – 24 November 1934) was a barrister and a political leader. He was known as "The Uncrowned King of Midnapore" and "Deshapran" (soul of the nation) because of his love and devotion to the country and for his efforts in the Swadeshi movement. He was arrested several times by the British police. He was notably cremated vertically upright as per his dying wish, symbolising the firmness of his spine and his ability to remain standing straight despite the Colonial oppression.

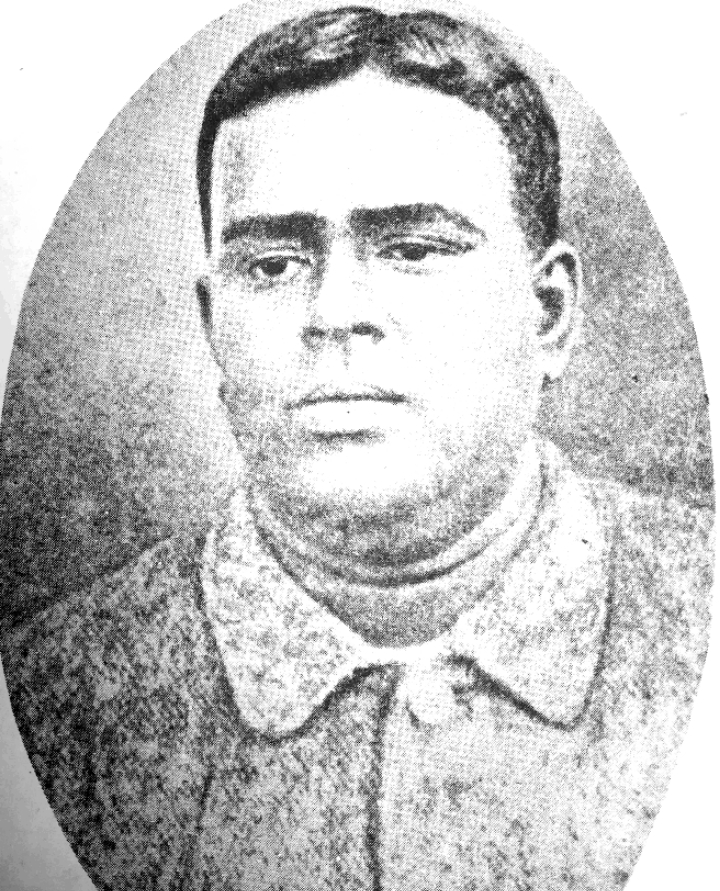

He was the principal representative of the Indian National Congress at Midnapore. He was instrumental in organizing mass uprisings and protests in the Midnapore district on behalf of the Congress and later the Swaraj Party. He was also one of the most influential leaders of the Bengal Presidency during the freedom struggle. He was essentially a "people's leader". As a barrister, he represented many of the accused in cases against the British Raj. He was one of the major associates of Chittaranjan Das, and along with Das and others, he was a founding member of the Swaraj Party and later worked as its principal organizer in Bengal. He served as the general secretary of the party's Bengal branch.

== Early life ==
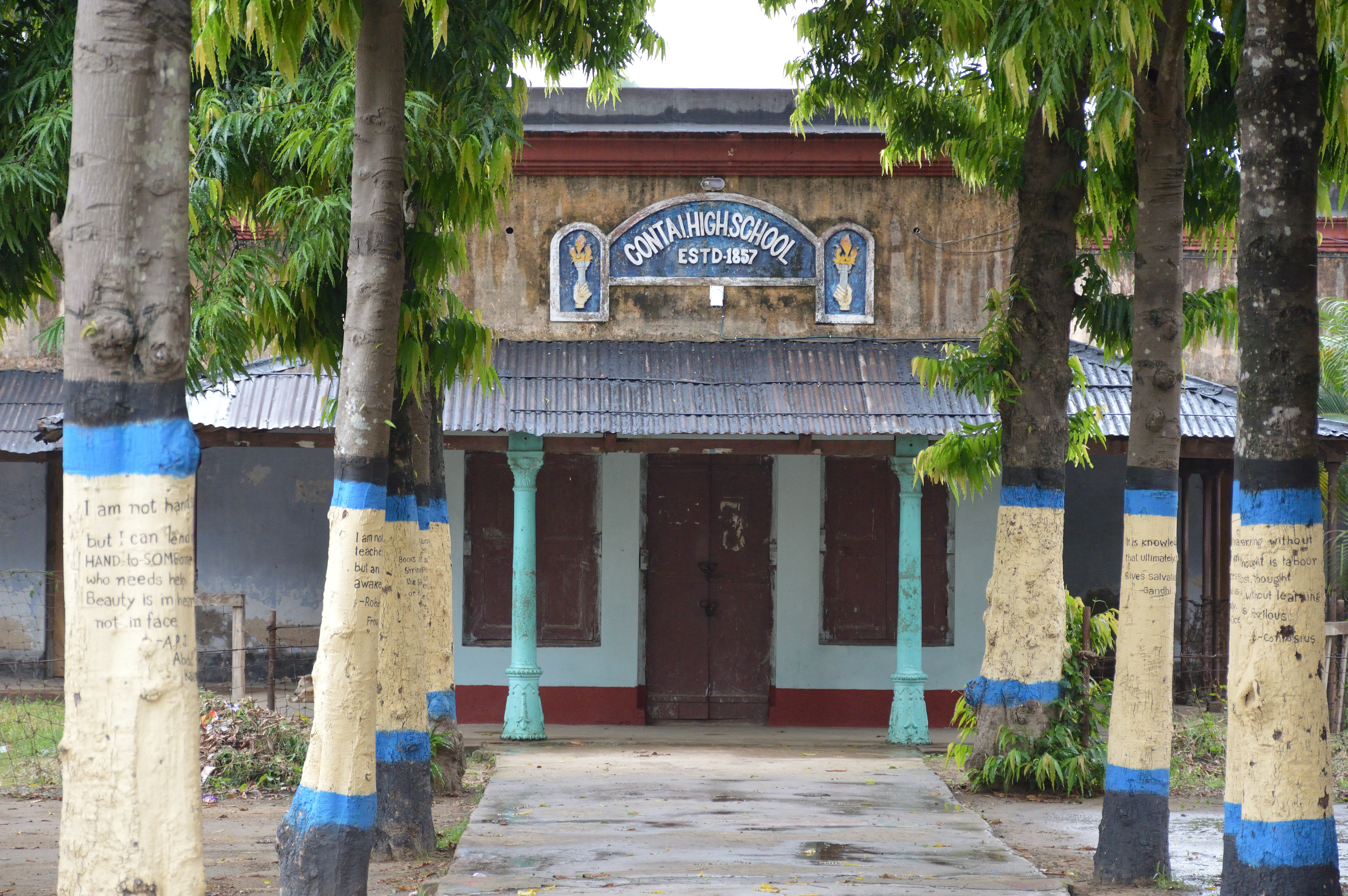
Contai High School

Birendranath Sasmal was born into an aristocratic Mahishya family at Chandiveti village, Contai, in the former undivided Midnapore district. His father was a zamindar, Biswambhar Sasmal, and his mother was Anandamoyee Devi. His great-grandfather, Karunakar Sasmal, had purchased rights over a few taluks after the Permanent Settlement of 1793. The Sasmal family of Chandibheti village was a very old and respected zamindar family of Contai. They were originally from Junput, near the sea coast of the Bay of Bengal. His grandfather, Chandi Charan Sasmal, had received subsequent land grants from the Raja of Birkul, and consequently increased their land holdings by buying lands near and across the region. Brahmoism had made a deep impact on his family. A few of his family members had also converted to the Brahmo religion prior. His elder brother, Rai Sahib Bipin Bihari Sasmal, was an eminent Zamindar of Midnapore district and the Chairman of the Contai Municipal Board.

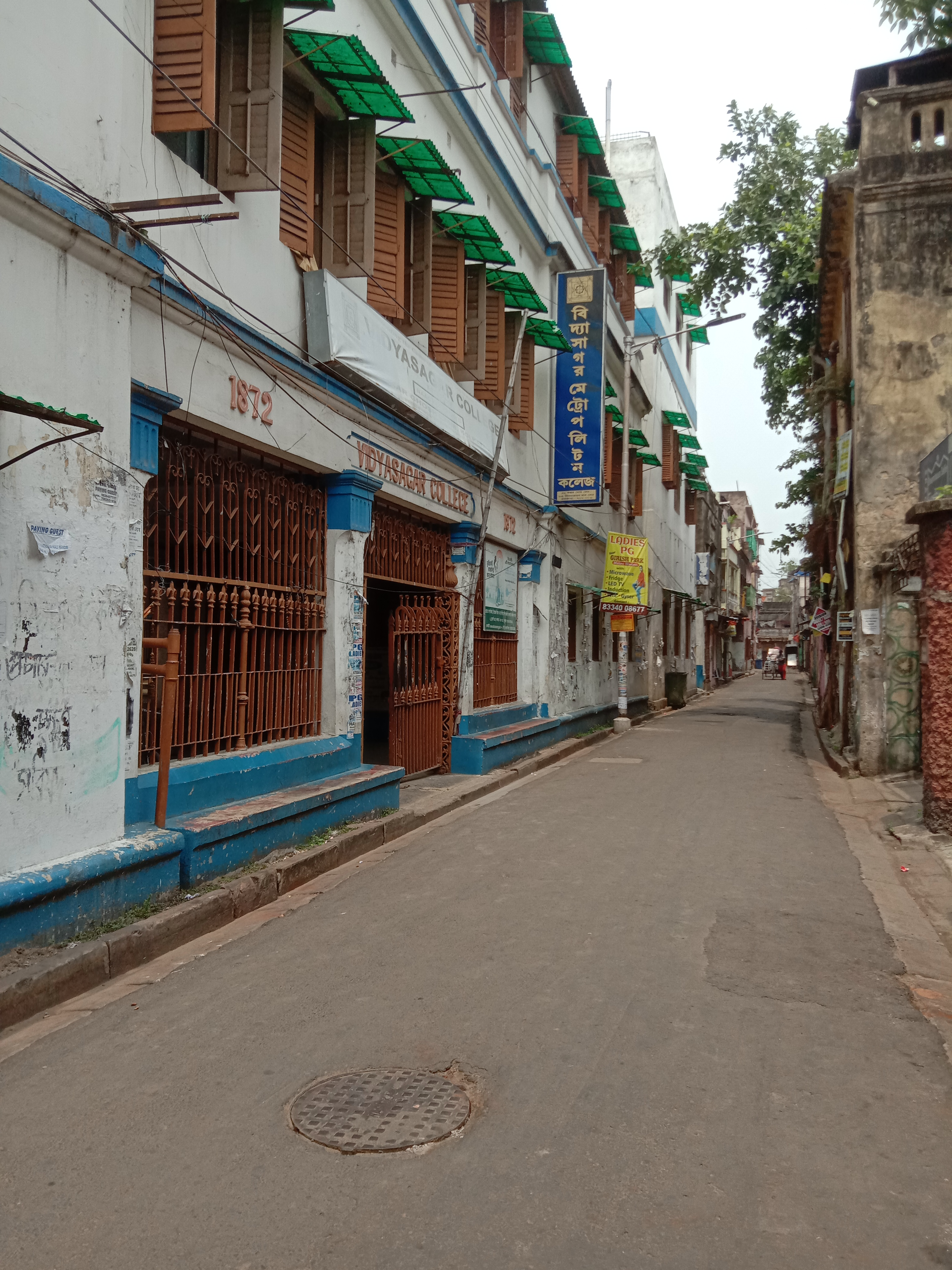
Metropolitan College, at 39, Sankar Ghosh Lane, Simla, Machuabazar.

He was admitted to Contai High School in 1893 and passed the entrance examination in 1900 from the same school; there, the teachings of two nationalistic teachers, Tarak Gopal Ghosh and Sashibhushan Chakraborty, greatly influenced him. Subsequently, he got admission into Metropolitan College, Calcutta, and then transferred to Ripon College of Calcutta as he was influenced by Surendranath Banerjee.

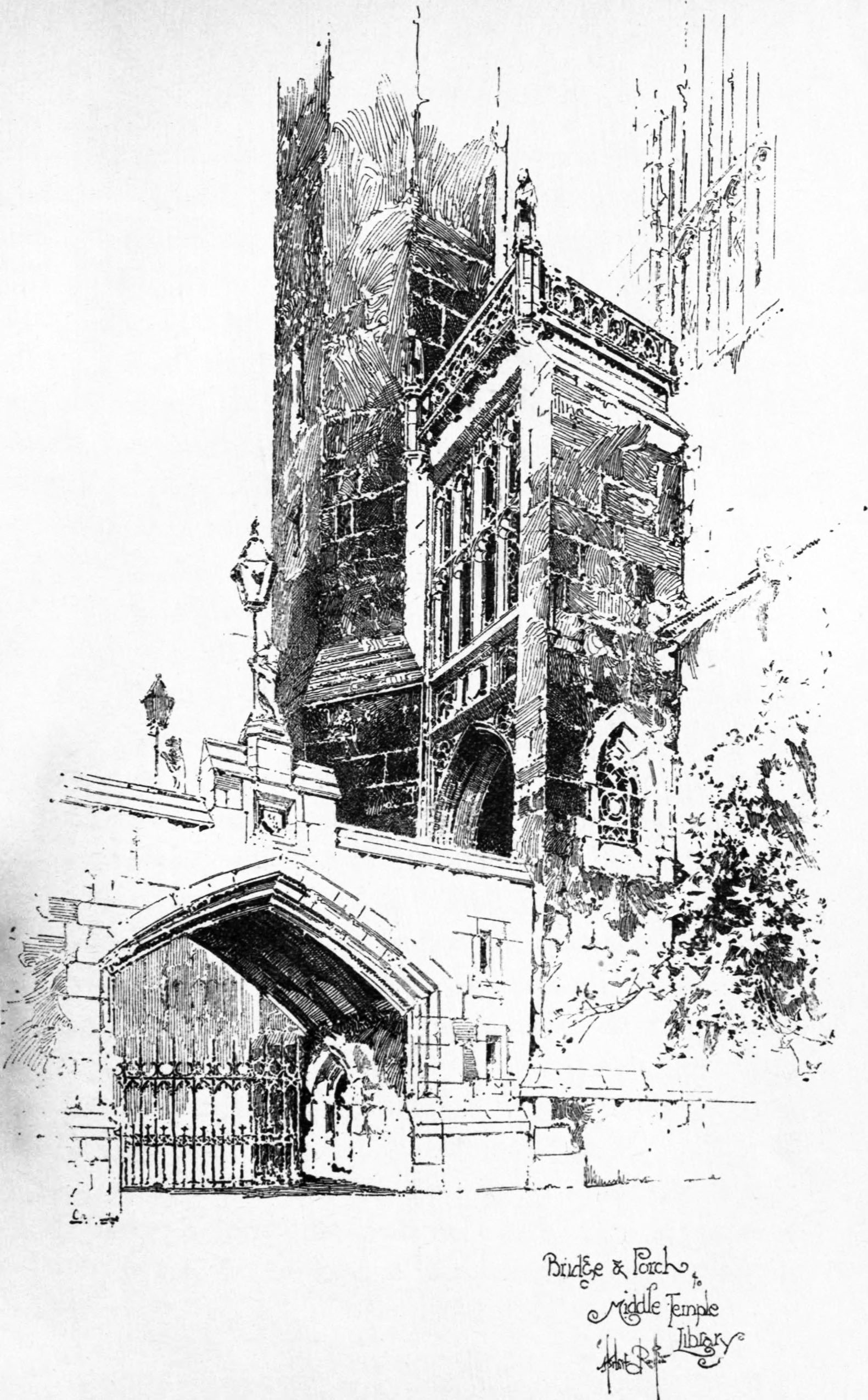
Middle Temple, London. One of the Inns of Court, circa, 1895.

After finishing his college education, he left for England in 1902 to study law at the Middle Temple; during this time he travelled extensively, visiting the United States, France, and Japan. During his 5-month stay in New York City, he was both fascinated and intrigued by the application of the democratic ideals and principles prevalent in American society, for which he had a lifelong deep admiration.

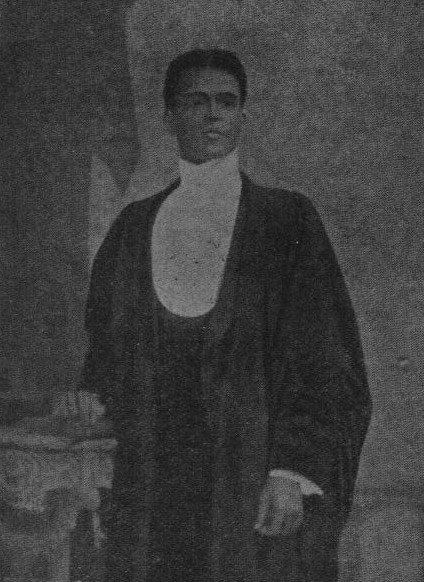
Birendranath Sasmal as a Pupil-Barrister at The Honourable Society of the Middle Temple in 1903.

One of the inspirations for his desire to pursue law as a subject was the fact that at that time, there was an evident scarcity of lawyers willing to stand up for the nationalistic cause or to represent the revolutionaries. He returned to India in 1904 after becoming a barrister.

== Legal career ==
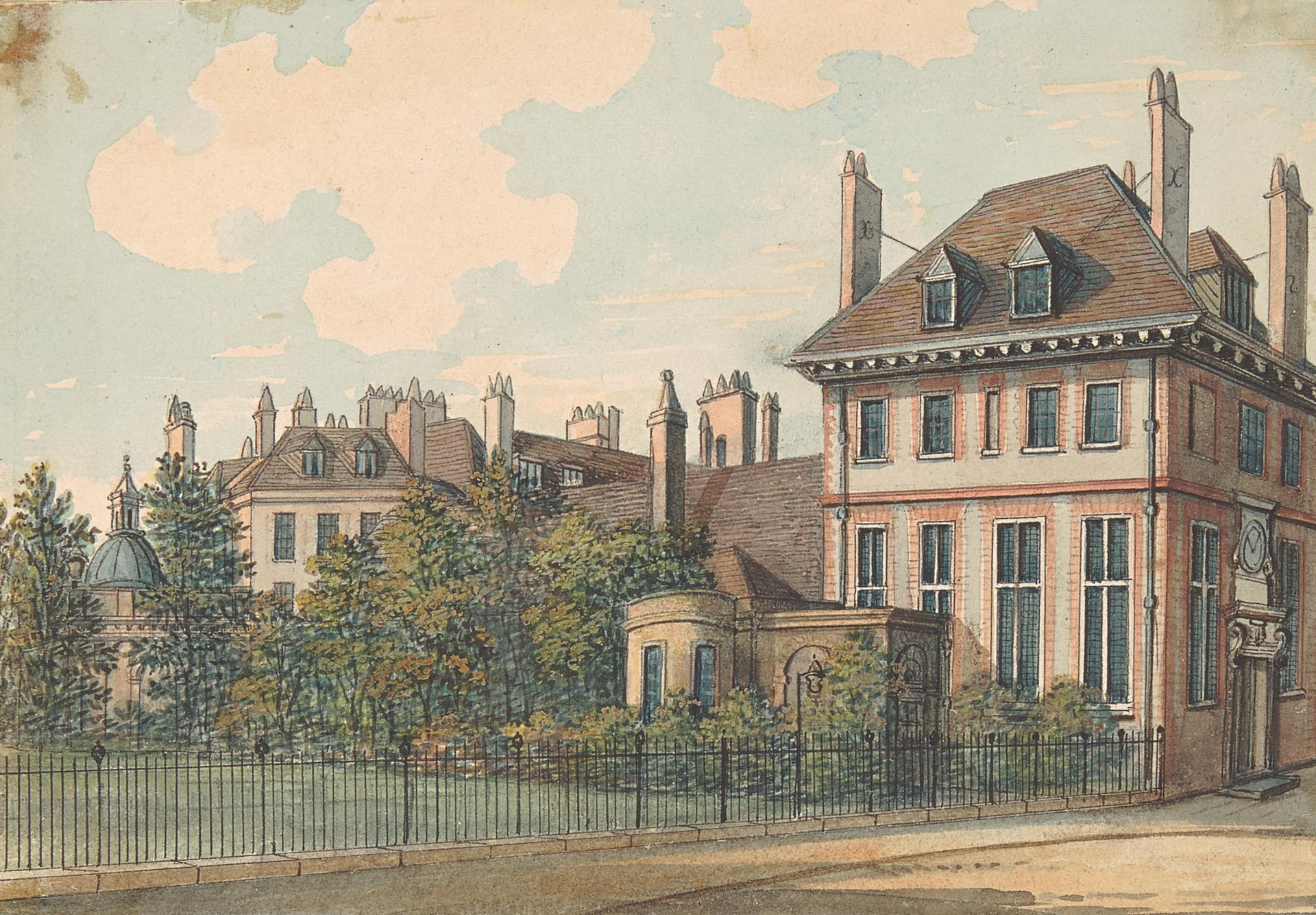
Middle Temple, London

After being awarded his degree in law, Sasmal was called to the Bar at the Middle Temple in England in 1904. He returned to Calcutta and started his practice as a barrister at the Calcutta High Court. Although he never believed in the principles of armed struggle himself, he nevertheless defended revolutionaries in various criminal cases and saved them from the gallows. In 1905, during the protest against the Partition of Bengal, he took a leading role in the protests in the district. In 1906, he represented a young Khudiram Bose as his defence counsel, who had been arrested on the charges of distributing seditious pamphlets against the British Raj in Midnapore town, and managed to exonerate him.

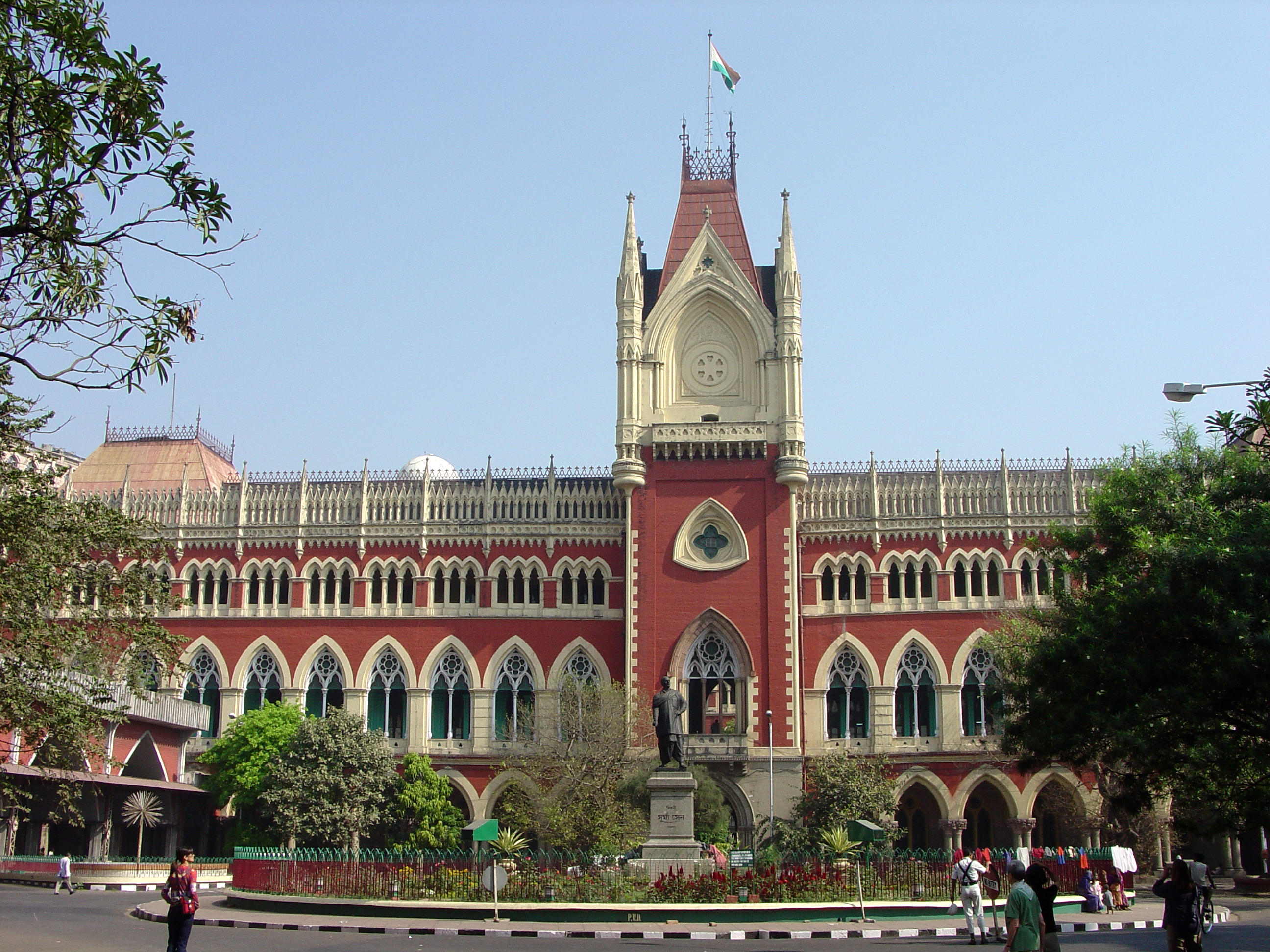
The Calcutta High Court, where B. N. Sasmal practiced law for nearly 30 years

During his years of legal practice in Calcutta, he had established himself as a competent lawyer and a distinguished member of the Calcutta Bar Association. He was known for his knack in both civil cases and criminal cases, especially those against the British Raj. He sometimes even travelled to other districts to represent the accused in cases of the nationalistic cause. However early in his career, after a few years of practice he temporarily switched to the Medinipur District Court in 1907 because he felt disconnected from his roots.

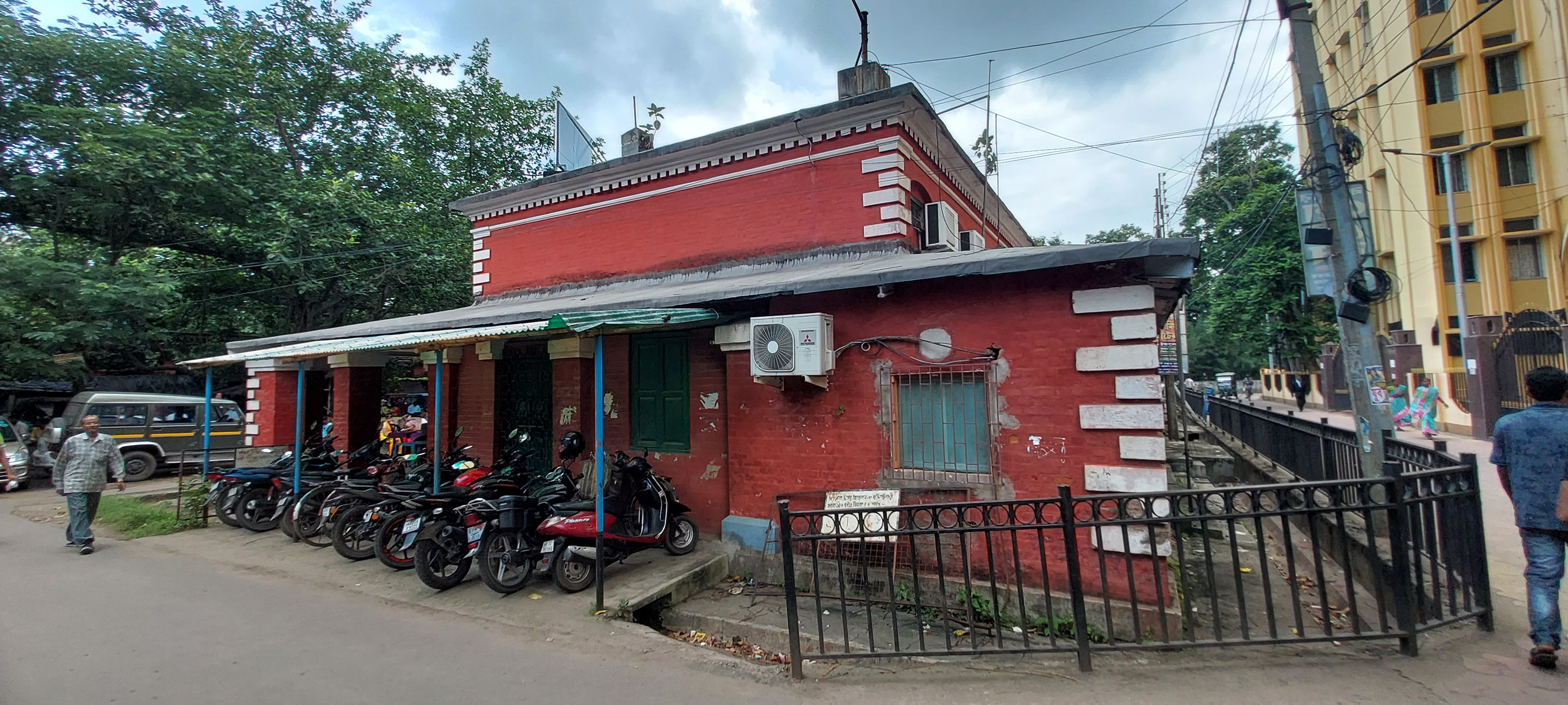
The Midnapore District Court, where he is still revered

Using his legal aptitude, he interpreted and marked the various oppressive acts passed by the British Raj and led protests against it. This was expressed during his protests against the Bengal Village Self Government Act of 1919. He became a member of the district board and municipality, and actively engaged in various forms of social welfare and also played a crucial role during the Midnapore floods of 1913, 1920, 1926, and 1933. In 1913, he became the convener of the session of the Bengal Provincial Political Conference at Mymensingh. Next year, he represented Midnapore district at the Bengal Provincial Conference. By 1913, he again resumed his practice at the Calcutta High Court, but in 1921, he gave up his flourishing and thriving practice and committed himself to the non-cooperation movement. For his participation, he was arrested along with Chittaranjan Das, Subhas Chandra Bose, Maulana Azad, and others and was imprisoned in the Alipore Central Jail.

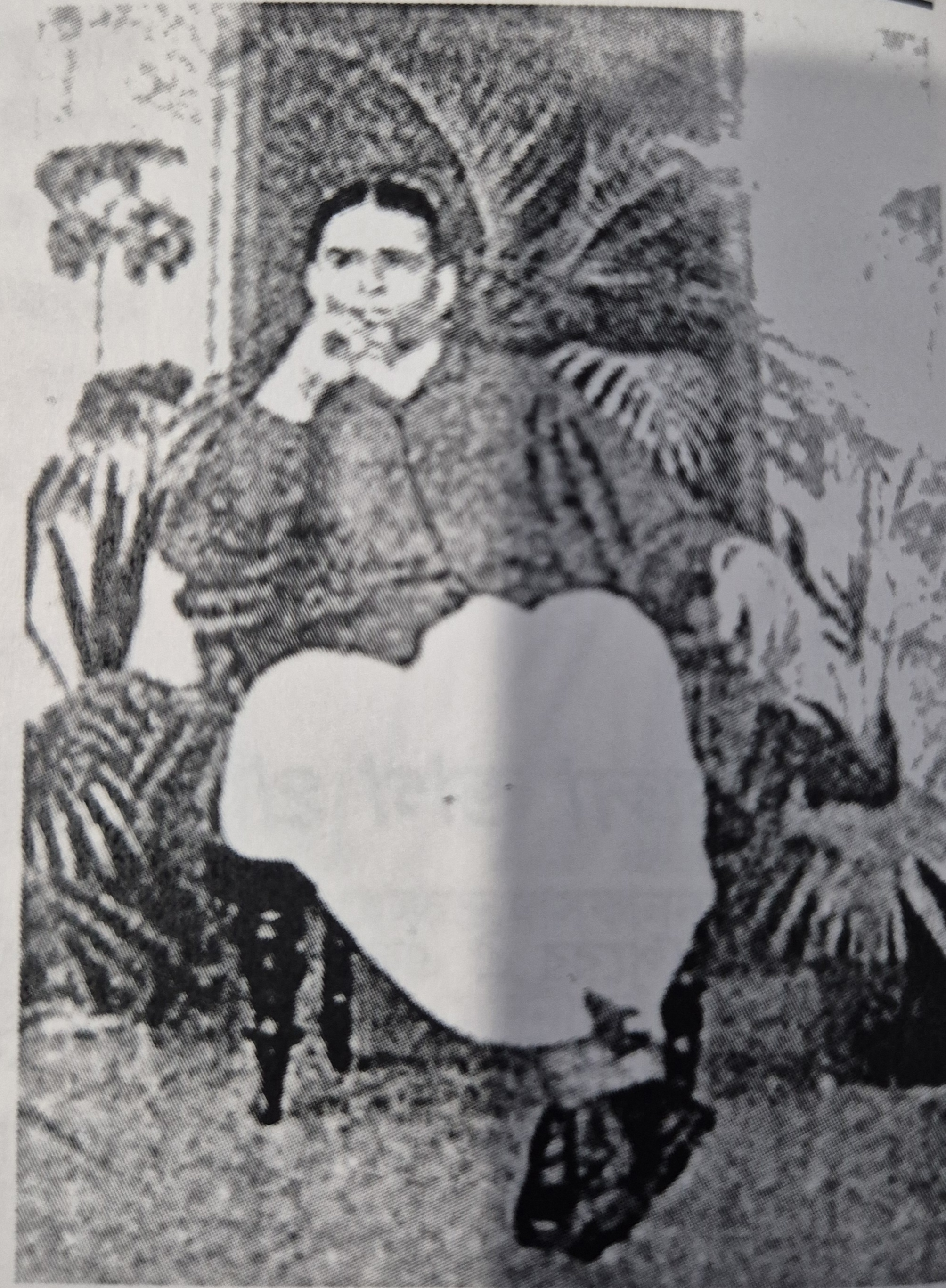
Deshapran Sasmal as a seasoned and experienced barrister from the Middle Temple. This was taken during his time as a legal practitioner fighting for the cause of the revolutionaries across the various courts of the Bengal Presidency.

He was once again arrested in 1930 for the leading role he played during the Civil Disobedience movement. Immediately after his release, he rushed to Chittagong to defend the accused, including Surya Sen, Pritilata Waddedar, and others, in the Chittagong armoury raid case. He managed to acquit 32 revolutionaries, and 12 others were deported to the Andamans, and 2 received only minor three-year prison sentences. He refused to charge any legal fees for this service. Once again, he acted as the defence counsel for the accused in the Douglas shooting case by the members of the Bengal Volunteers, including Pradyot Kumar Bhattacharya and Prabhanshu Sekhar Pal. However, Pradyot Kumar Bhattacharya was hanged due to his brother's betrayal. Furthermore, he pleaded for the accused members of the Bengal Volunteers in the case of the murder of the oppressive district magistrate, Bernard E. J. Burge, acquitting multiple members in the process, and also saved the young revolutionary, Bhupal Chandra Panda, from imprisonment or being permanently deported to the Andamans.

== Political activities ==
For political reasons, Midnapore district was proposed to be divided into two by the British Raj, and Deshapran started protesting against it. He toured the region and organised protest movements. The proposal for partition was withdrawn. He started practising law at Calcutta High Court in 1904. In 1913, leaving Calcutta High Court, Birendranath practiced in Midnapore District Court for a few years, but later he again joined the High Court. He along with Subhas Chandra Bose and Jatindra Mohan Sengupta, was regarded as one of the three foremost Lieutenants of C. R. Das in Bengal. In the High Court, he defended the accused in the Chittagong Armed Robbery case. He was jailed for nine months by the British Raj for calling a general strike during the visit of King George V to British India. During his stay at Presidency Jail, he wrote his autobiography named Sroter Trina. He was nationally very well known during the Indian freedom movement and had direct correspondences with leaders such as Motilal Nehru and Madan Mohan Malaviya.

=== Non-cooperation movement (1920) ===
Sasmal played a leading role in the 1920 Calcutta Session of the National Congress and supported the Non-cooperation movement of 1921. Sasmal, by then, had joined the Swarajya Party of Chittaranjan Das. He was made Secretary of the Bengal Provincial Congress. During this period he also successfully led the local anti-Union Board agitation in Midnapore.

=== No-tax movement (1920–1922) ===
The Bengal Village Self Government Act was passed in 1919. According to that law, 227 union boards were formed in the district. Birendranath took up the cause of his people and plunged into the boycott movement. He declared that he would walk on bare feet until the union boards were not done away with. On 17 December 1921, 226 Union Boards were abolished, and the last one was abolished the next year. In a gathering, with loud cheers, people put shoes on the feet of their leader.

=== Chairman of the Medinipur District Board (1923–1924) ===
In 1923, with a huge majority, Deshapran Birendranath Sasmal was elected chairman of the Midnapore district board. Prior to his election, Midnapore had been usually politically governed by outsiders from other districts who had previously migrated to Midnapore district for employment or other reasons, which henceforth changed after his grand victory. He worked diligently for the development of Midnapore district. He improved the health department, ensured the supply of water, spread education, and developed the roads. Dispensaries increased by a large number during his tenure as chairman. He also strengthened the primary education in the district, sanctioning a huge sum of 51,000,000 rupees, which was an unprecedented amount for education. He was also instrumental in establishing the innovative National Schools throughout the district, which were one of a kind. These national schools, still continue to serve as the pillars of pre-college education in the rural levels of the district.

=== Labon Satyagraha (1930) ===
Birendranath was also involved in the civil disobedience movement. His followers took an active part in organizing people. Satyagrahis came to Narghat and Pichhhaboni to break the Salt Law by peaceful means. The Satyagraha assumed the form of a mass movement in the area.

=== Opposition to district division (1932–1933) ===
In 1932, a plan was hatched by the British Raj to separate some bordering regions of the Midnapore district, and to amalgamate them into Odisha. Along with some of the other leading intellectuals and prominent political leaders of the district, Deshapran Birendranath Sasmal started fierce protests against it. He was held to be the undisputed leader of the district and was regarded as the principal spokesperson regarding its best interests. Apart from the direct protests, he also wrote and published numerous articles in the mainstream media to bring to light the unfair move made by the Government. Due to his earnest opposition, the British Raj could not succeed in their attempt at separating Midnapore district from Bengal. Ultimately, Odisha was formed without the Midnapore district in 1935.

=== Election to Calcutta Corporation, Central Legislative Assembly (1930–1934) ===
In 1933, Birendranath was elected to the Calcutta Corporation. At the request of Pandit Madan Mohan Malaviya, he contested in the Central Legislative Assembly election from a two–district seat of Burdwan division and won it but died before the result was announced.

== Withdrawal from politics ==
In 1924, when Birendranath Sasmal claimed the post of chief executive officer of the Calcutta Corporation, an untoward situation occurred. A battle took place between Subhas Chandra Bose and Birendranath Sasmal for the post of the chief executive officer of Calcutta Municipal Corporation, which then dominated political the life of Bengal. Bose was ultimately chosen even though Chittaranjan Das had originally proposed to reward the services of Sasmal by offering him the job, he soon backed out. One of them, Nirmal Chunder, even went so far as to comment, 'Will a keot from Midnapur come and rule in Calcutta?'. Sasmal asked his mentor Das two questions at a meeting of the Bengal Provincial Congress Committee (BPCC): '(1) Subhas Bose had been elected member and his brother Sarat Bose alderman of the Calcutta Corporation by the Swaraj Party. Why was the BPCC bent on establishing the mastery of one family over the corporation? (2) In the highest executive post of the corporation, it was being proposed that he be bypassed and another man appointed. Was this because he was held in contempt for his comparatively low caste?' Das expressed annoyance with the first question and gave an inadequate answer to the second, which did not satisfy Sasmal. A newspaper also reported that he was greeted with derogatory slogans because of his Oriya origin, and he was denied the post. Sasmal left the BPCC in thorough disillusionment and displeasure and returned to his law practice and control of local politics in Medinipur district. His unfortunate departure was subjected to great political debate and discussion during the contemporary times. The public stance was that Bengal had lost one of its foremost and highly respected leaders of the Indian independence movement to petty internal politics. Acharya Prafulla Chandra Ray publicly expressed his dejection and disgust at this incident. Motilal Nehru even wrote him a letter requesting him to return.

== Family ==
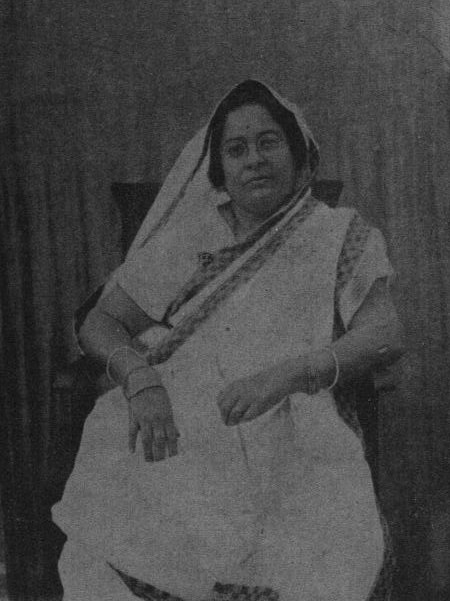
Hemanta Kumari Debi, Wife of Deshapran B. N. Sasmal.

While practicing at the Midnapore District Court, he married Hemantakumari Devi, a Kashmiri Pandit lady. To make her familiar with the Bengali language and culture, he made a library in his home. They had two children. A daughter, Ashrukona, and a son, Bimalananda. His son, Dr. Bimalananda Sasmal was also a notable Barrister of the Calcutta High Court and also a notable writer. He authored many books on Mysticism and the Indian independence movement.

== Death ==
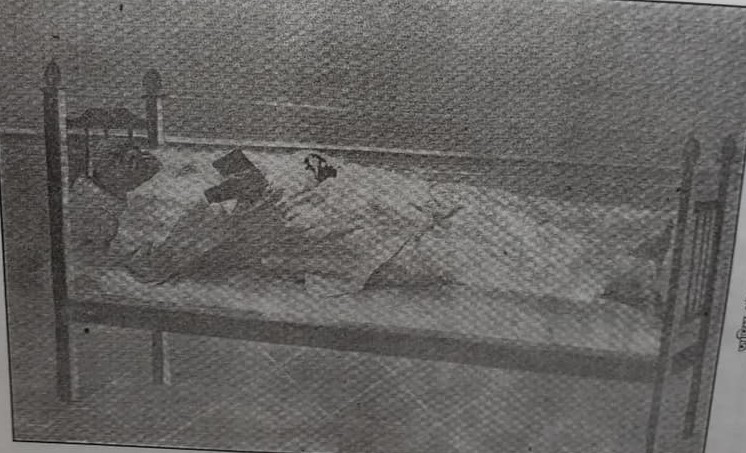
Deshapran B. N. Sasmal, before his death. This was taken after his return from Kharagpur, a few days before his untimely death.

On 19 November 1934, he was returning from Medinipur to Calcutta after a council election and due to a matter related to his legal practice. En route, at Kharagpur, he was purposely misinformed by a miscreant that he had lost the recently held national election of the Burdwan division. The sudden and unexpected news had a hugely negative effect on his health, to the extent that he suffered high blood pressure, which consequently resulted in a brain stroke. Despite having arranged for him immediate medical attention by his co passengers, his health remained unstable. However, after his arrival at the Howrah station, he received the correct information, that in reality he had won the election. He was escorted to his Calcutta house by his well wishers and supporters, who had gathered to congratulate him on his victory. Nevertheless, this great mental turmoil had drastically affected his health. Birendranath Sasmal died of a heart attack on 24 November 1934 at the age of 53. As per his last wishes, he was symbolically cremated vertically upright, with his head held up towards the sky, at the Keoratola crematorium with great ceremony.

== Legacy and influence ==
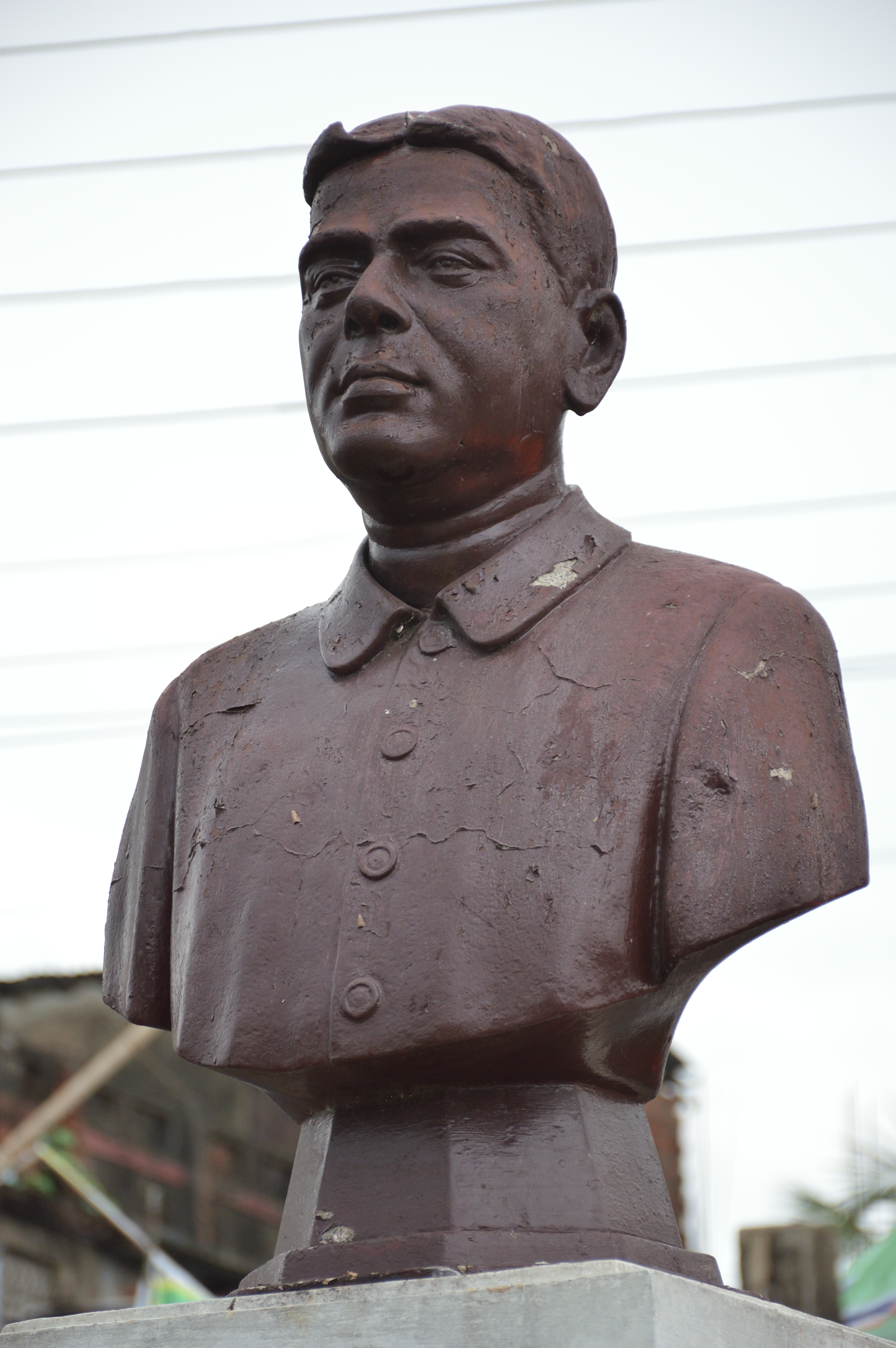
His bust at Contai.

Sasmal was an ardent follower of Mahatma Gandhi and had unflinching faith in Non-Violent movement. He thought, "Violence begets violence". Sasmal used to say, "For whom shall I live if not for the people?". He was given the honorific sobriquet "Uncrowned king" of Medinipur by Acharya Prafulla Chandra Ray. He had bitter experience in the politics of Calcutta, but he was loved in Kanthi and Tamluk. A road in Tollygunge in South Kolkata (Deshparan Sasmal Road) is named after him in 1957. The Deshapran community development block in Kanthi subdivision is named after Sasmal. Deshapran Mahavidyalaya, a college under Vidyasagar University, has been named after him. Also, the Deshapran railway station near Bajkul has been established in his name. Schools, clubs, organisations and streets that bear his name indicate his permanent seat in the heart of people.

== Gallery ==
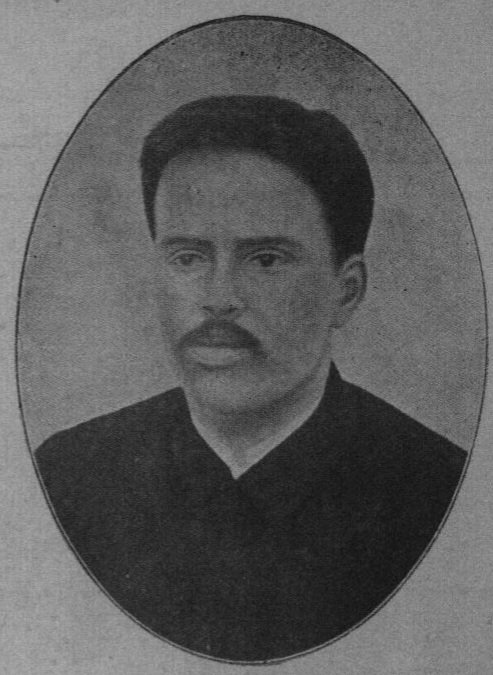
A young B. N. Sasmal, taken while he was a student at the Ripon College at Calcutta.

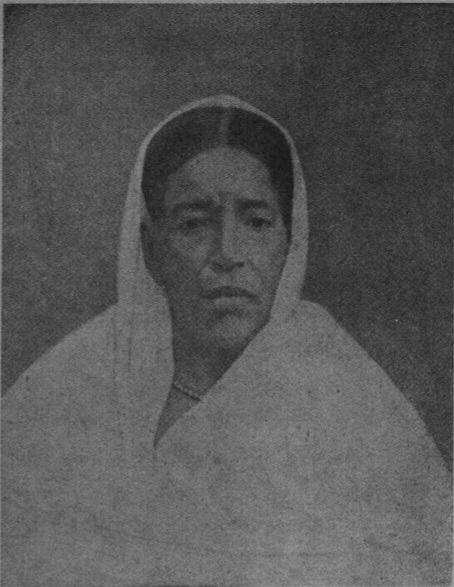
Anandamoyee Debi, mother of Deshapran B. N. Sasmal. She was born to Babu Panchanan Malla of Durgapur near Contai in 1851. She lost her mother at an early age, and was therefore raised by her father.

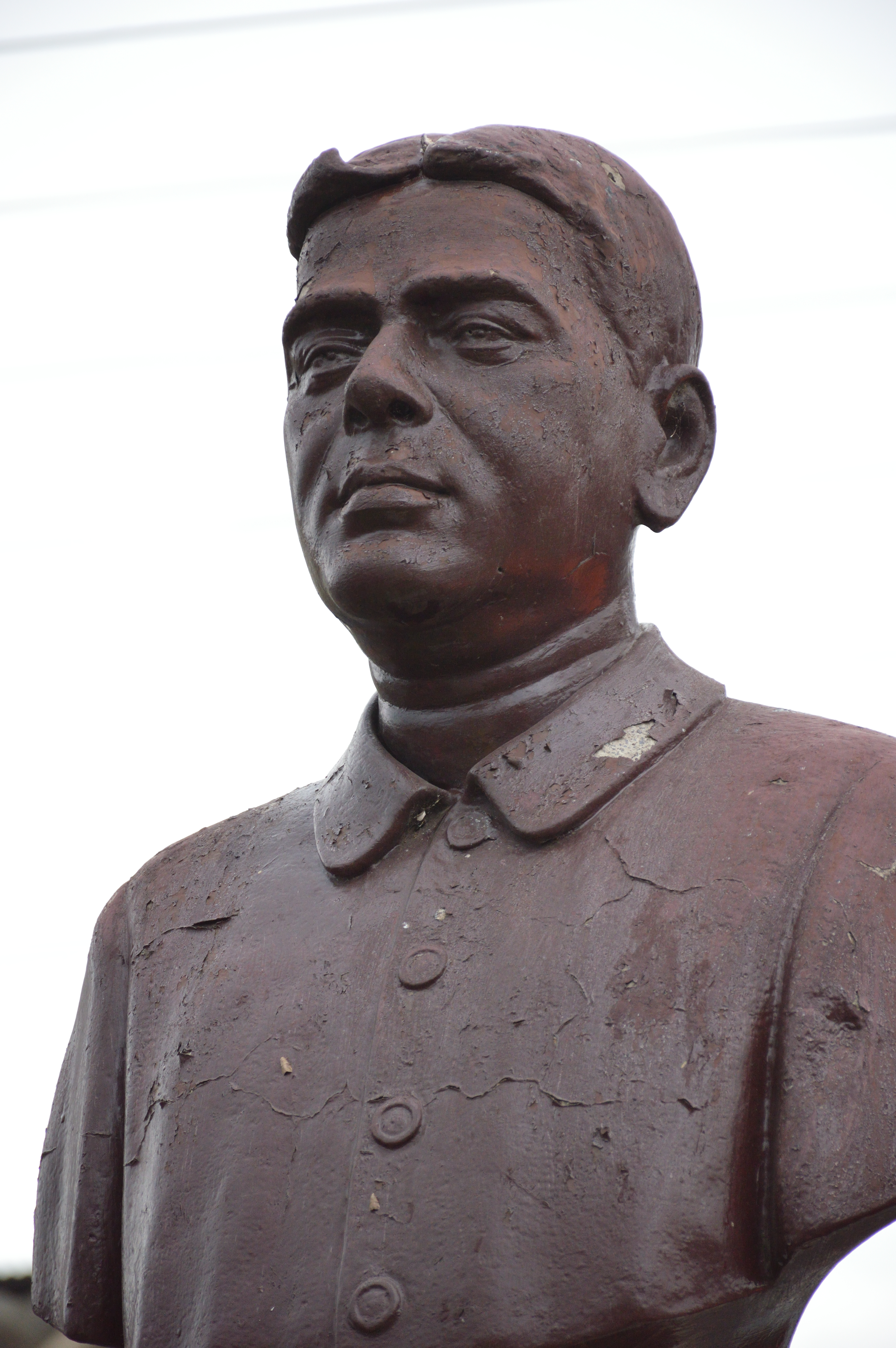
Bust of Deshapran B. N. Sasmal at Contai.

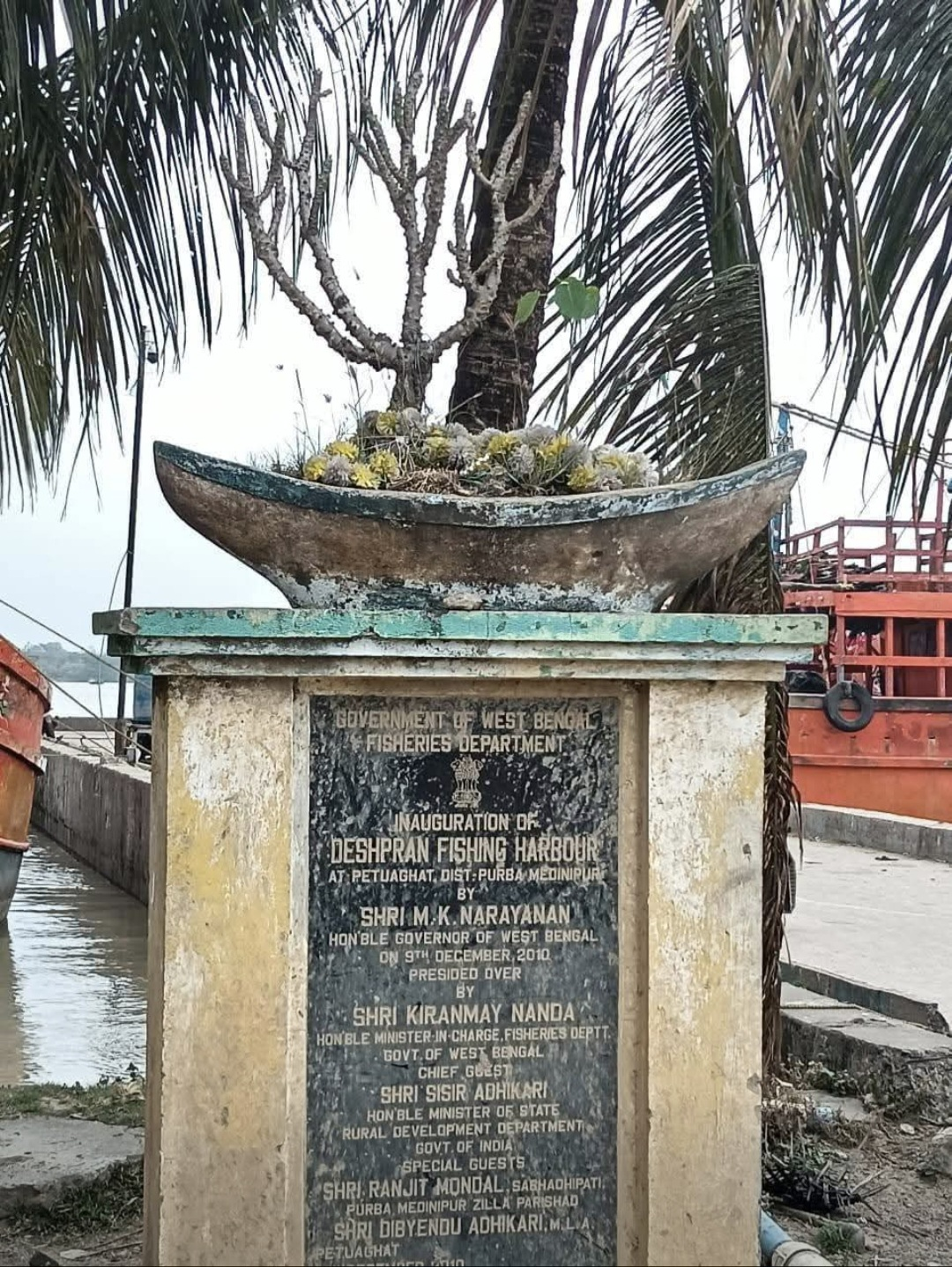
A Fishing Harbour was inaugurated in his name by Kiranmay Nanda. Located in Petuaghat, Purba Medinipur.

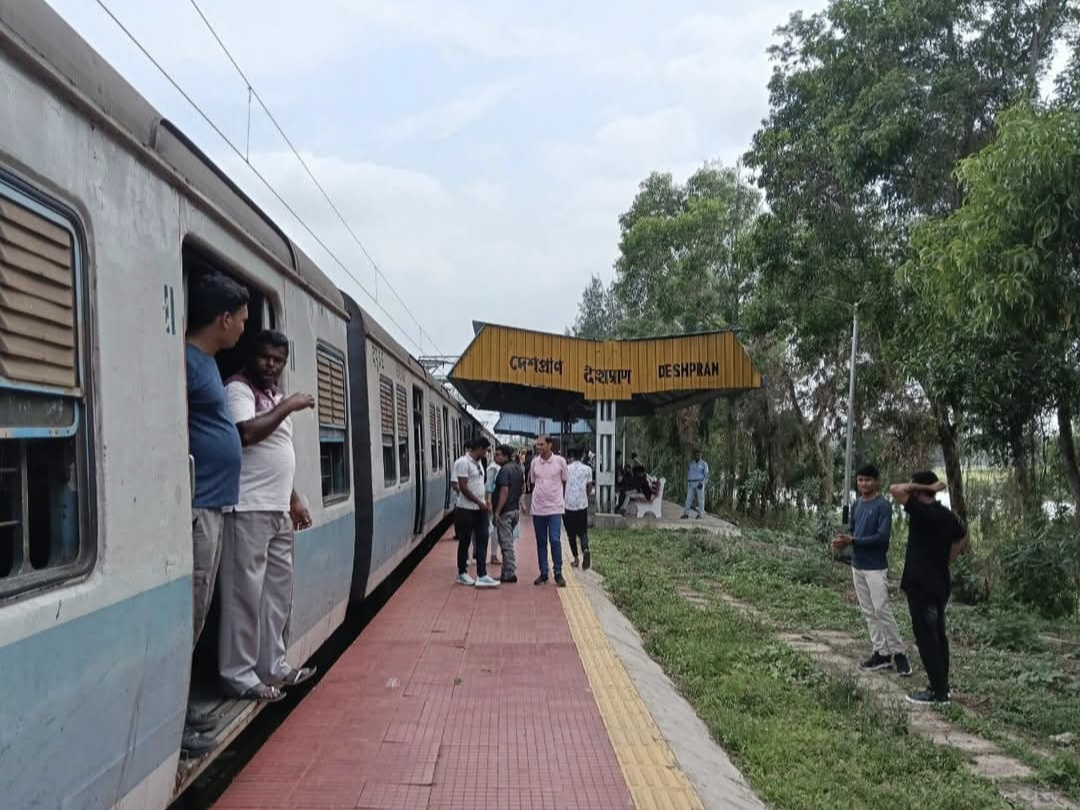
The Deshapran railway station in Purba Medinipur.

== See also ==
- Deshapran Mahavidyalaya
- Deshapran railway station
- List of members of the Middle Temple
