= Contai =

Contai Kanthi
- City
- Contai Municipality
- Nickname: Coastal City
- Location in West Bengal, India Contai (India)
- Coordinates: 21.78°N 87.75°E
- Country: India
- State: West Bengal
- District: Midnapore East
- Sub Division: Contai subdivision
- Established: 1958

Government
  - Type: Municipality
  - Body: Contai Municipality
  - Chairman: Manasi Panda

Area
  - Total: 14 km^{2} (5.4 sq mi)
- Elevation: 6 m (20 ft)

Population (2011)
  - Total: 92,226
  - Density: 4,492/km^{2} (11,630/sq mi)
- Demonym: Medinipur

Languages
  - Official: Bengali, English
- Time zone: UTC+5:30 (IST)
- PIN: 721401
- Telephone code: 91-3220
- Vehicle registration: WB-31-xxxx, WB-32-xxxx
- Lok Sabha constituency: Contai
- Vidhan Sabha constituency: Contai South
- Website: contaimunicipality.org.in

Contai, also known as Kanthi (Kām̐thi, Bengali pronunciation: [kãt̪ʰi]), is a coastal and subdivisional city and a municipality in East Midnapore district, West Bengal, India. It is the headquarters of the Contai subdivision.

== Etymology ==
In the 5th century, during the visit of Fa-Hien, Contai was uninhabited and had no name for the outside world. In Valentine's travelogue, a harbour, Petua by name, was mentioned. This harbour was on the bank of the river Rasulpur, a short distance from the Rasulpur estuary. Later the harbour was shifted to the present site of the Contai Town. However, it is said, the name of the abandoned port was retained for its new location, In foreigners tongue, Petua is said to have changed first to Cauntee and finally to Contai, whereas in local tongue it has changed to Kanthi.

According to the geologists, the present geographical dimension of Contai came into existence with the great natural disaster of the third century AD (flood), which created Chilka lake out of the Chilka Bay. Kanthi, that is Contai, means "sand-bound reefs" or sand walls. The name Contai may thus be an English expression of the local jargon meaning "sand heaps".

But linguists raise serious doubts about such change of pronunciation. They offer other suggestions. Yogesh Chandra Sarkar thinks that the name Kanthi owes its origin to outstretched sand-dune, about 27 miles from Rasulpur estuary to Peeplipattan, that from the sea looked like a long wall or Kanth as it is called by local people. Some suggest that the name may originate from the custom of local people to build long walls or Kanths around their habitation in order to keep off wild beasts like buffaloes, tigers and rhinoceroses that were found in abundance then and these Kanths gave the place its name.

== History ==
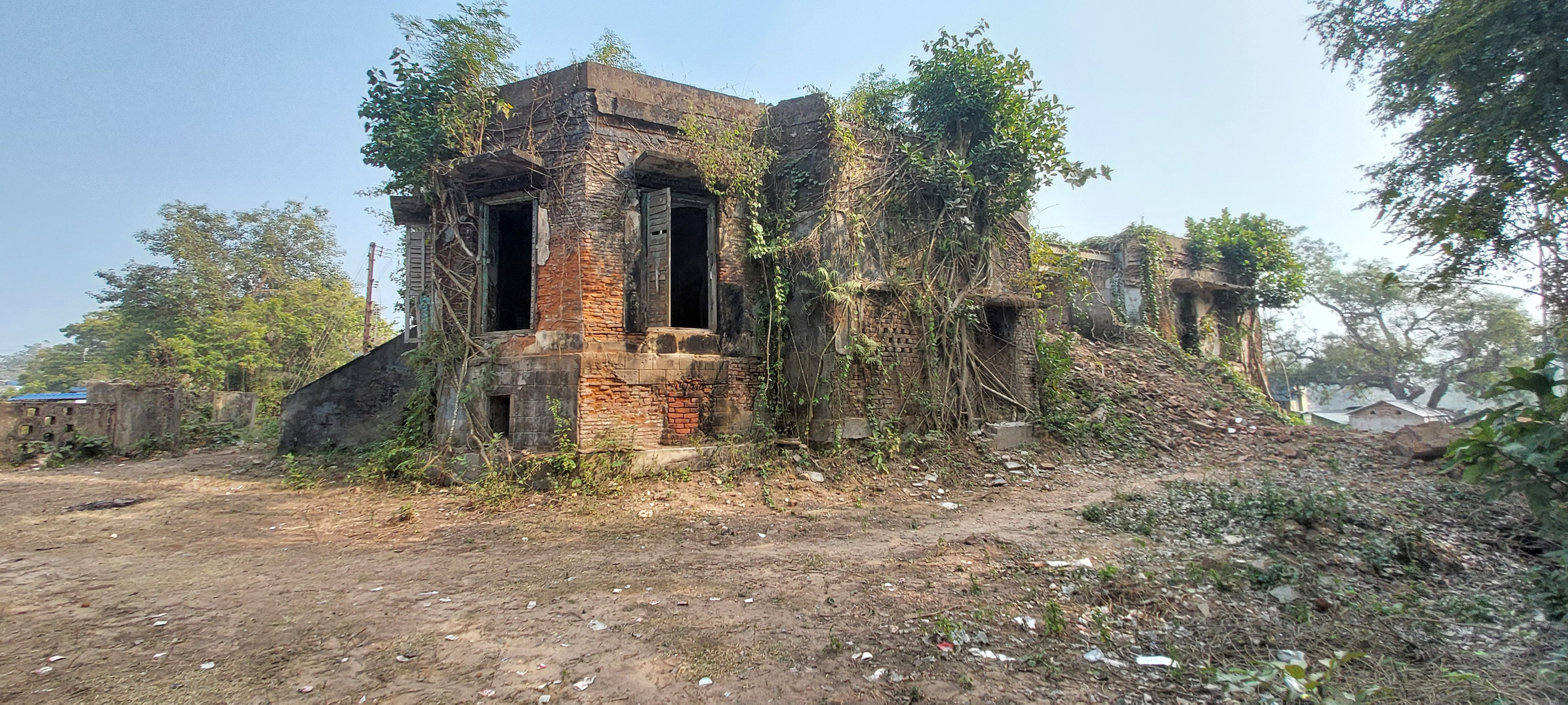
NimaK Mahal, the heritage former administrative building in Contai established by East India Company

In 1243, Contai was the site of the Battle of Katasin, in which Narasingha Deva I of the Eastern Ganga dynasty defeated Tughral Tughan Khan, the Bengal governor of the Mamluk dynasty of Delhi. Contai was later a part of the Hijli Kingdom, a tributary state of Orissa ruled by the Hindu king Gopinath Pattanayak. In 1852 the East India Company of British India announced Contai as a Sub-Division consisting of six police stations - Contai, Khejuri, Ramnagar, Bhagwanpur, Egra and Patashpur. But the Government continued working from Negua. The Sub-Division that covered 912 square miles (2,400 km^{2}) was the second largest in Bengal .In 1863 when Nimak Mahal (the salt factory and business center) at Contai, in the teeth of a serious crisis, ceased functioning, the Sub-Divisional office was shifted from Negua to the abandoned Nimak Mahal building.

Bankim Chandra Chottopadhyay, the precursor of Bengali novel, worked as the Deputy Magistrate of Contai, though for a short period, from January 1860 to November of the year.

== Geography ==
Cities and towns in Contai subdivision of Purba Medinipur district
M: municipal city/ town, CT: census town, R: rural/ urban centre, H: historical/ religious centre, S: port, sea-beach
Owing to space constraints in the small map, the actual locations in a larger map may vary slightly

=== Location ===
Contai is about 160 km from Kolkata and 31 km from the beach town Digha.

=== Climate ===
Contai receives heavy rains during monsoon. Winters are not that severe. Summers are average and cooler than that of northern India.

Climate data for Contai (1991–2020, extremes 1948–2020)
Month	Jan	Feb	Mar	Apr	May	Jun	Jul	Aug	Sep	Oct	Nov	Dec	Year
Record high °C (°F)	32.5 (90.5)	37.2 (99.0)	40.2 (104.4)	43.8 (110.8)	43.6 (110.5)	43.6 (110.5)	39.2 (102.6)	37.3 (99.1)	37.8 (100.0)	38.4 (101.1)	36.3 (97.3)	33.8 (92.8)	43.8 (110.8)
Mean daily maximum °C (°F)	25.0 (77.0)	28.5 (83.3)	33.0 (91.4)	35.3 (95.5)	36.4 (97.5)	35.0 (95.0)	32.9 (91.2)	32.2 (90.0)	32.4 (90.3)	31.8 (89.2)	30.0 (86.0)	26.1 (79.0)	31.6 (88.9)
Mean daily minimum °C (°F)	12.6 (54.7)	16.4 (61.5)	21.8 (71.2)	24.9 (76.8)	26.6 (79.9)	26.4 (79.5)	25.7 (78.3)	25.4 (77.7)	25.2 (77.4)	23.4 (74.1)	17.7 (63.9)	13.3 (55.9)	21.7 (71.1)
Record low °C (°F)	6.4 (43.5)	6.9 (44.4)	10.3 (50.5)	16.4 (61.5)	17.2 (63.0)	13.8 (56.8)	21.3 (70.3)	20.7 (69.3)	21.5 (70.7)	14.9 (58.8)	10.9 (51.6)	7.1 (44.8)	7.7 (45.9)
Average rainfall mm (inches)	10.4 (0.41)	20.4 (0.80)	30.8 (1.21)	39.9 (1.57)	130.7 (5.15)	223.2 (8.79)	360.5 (14.19)	362.7 (14.28)	363.9 (14.33)	189.5 (7.46)	31.2 (1.23)	5.4 (0.21)	1,768.6 (69.63)
Average rainy days	0.7	1.1	1.7	2.8	5.0	9.2	15.5	15.3	12.5	6.0	1.2	0.5	71.6
Average relative humidity (%) (at 17:30 IST)	73	75	71	71	73	75	75	72	76	77	72	71	73
Source: India Meteorological Department

=== Urbanisation ===
93.55% of the population of Contai subdivision live in the rural areas. Only 6.45% of the population live in the urban areas and it is considerably behind Haldia subdivision in urbanization, where 20.81% of the population live in urban areas.

== Demographics ==
As per 2011 Census of India, Contai had a total population of 92,226 of which 49,031 (53%) were males and 43,195 (47%) were females. Population below 6 years was 8,440. The total number of literates in Contai was 78,500 (93.69% of the population over 6 years).

As of 2001 India census, Contai had a population of 77,497. Males constitute 52% of the population and females 48%. Contai has an average literacy rate of 82%, higher than the national average of 59.5%: male literacy is 85% and, female literacy is 78%. In Contai, 10% of the population is under 6 years of age.

=== Language and religion ===
Religion in Contai (2011)
Hinduism	79.95%
Islam	19.80%
Other or not stated	0.25%

In 2011 census Hindus numbered 73,732 and formed 79.95% of the population in Contai Municipal Area. Muslims numbered 18,263 and formed 19.80% of the population. Others numbered 231 and formed 0.25% of the population. In 2001, Hindus made up 79.95% and Muslims 19.80% of the population respectively.

== Police stations ==
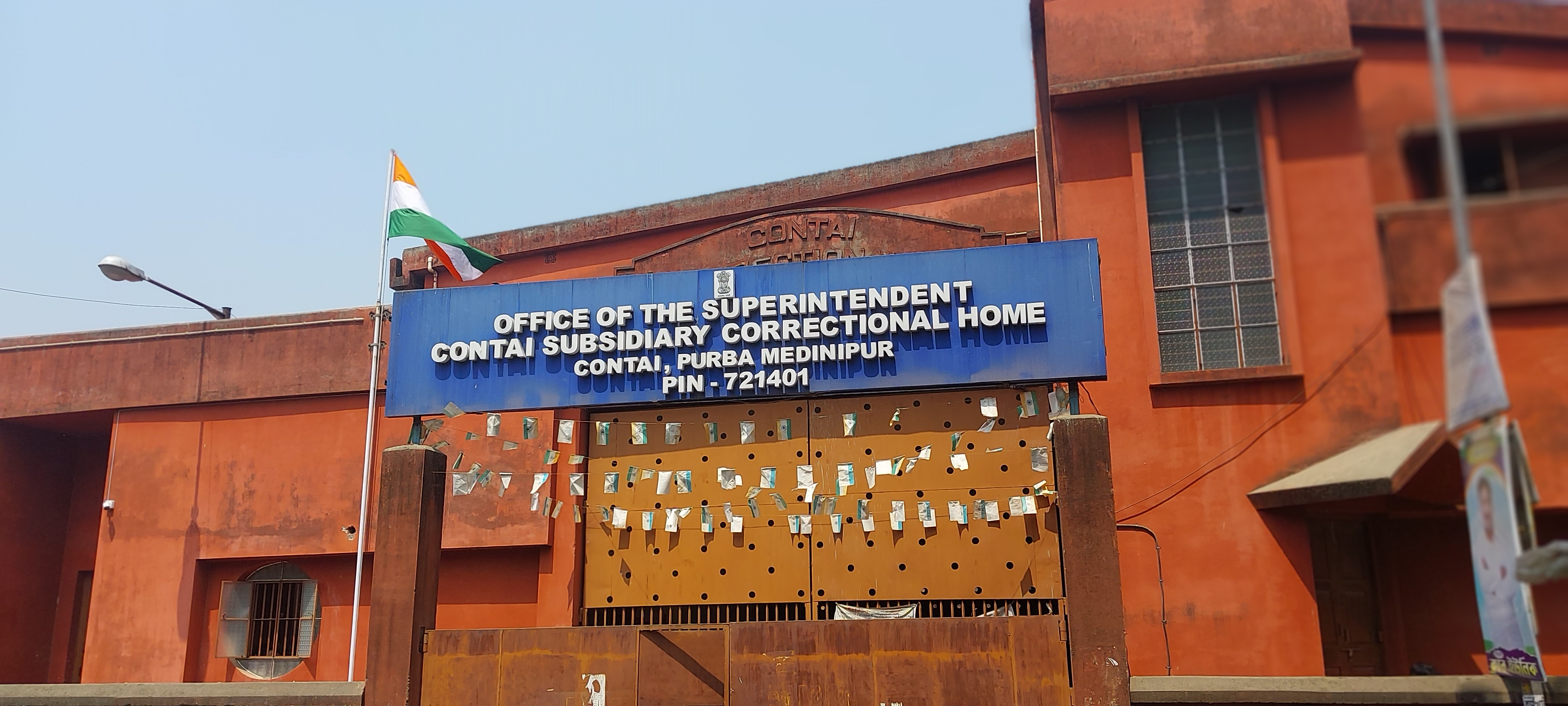
Contai Subsidiary Correctional Home

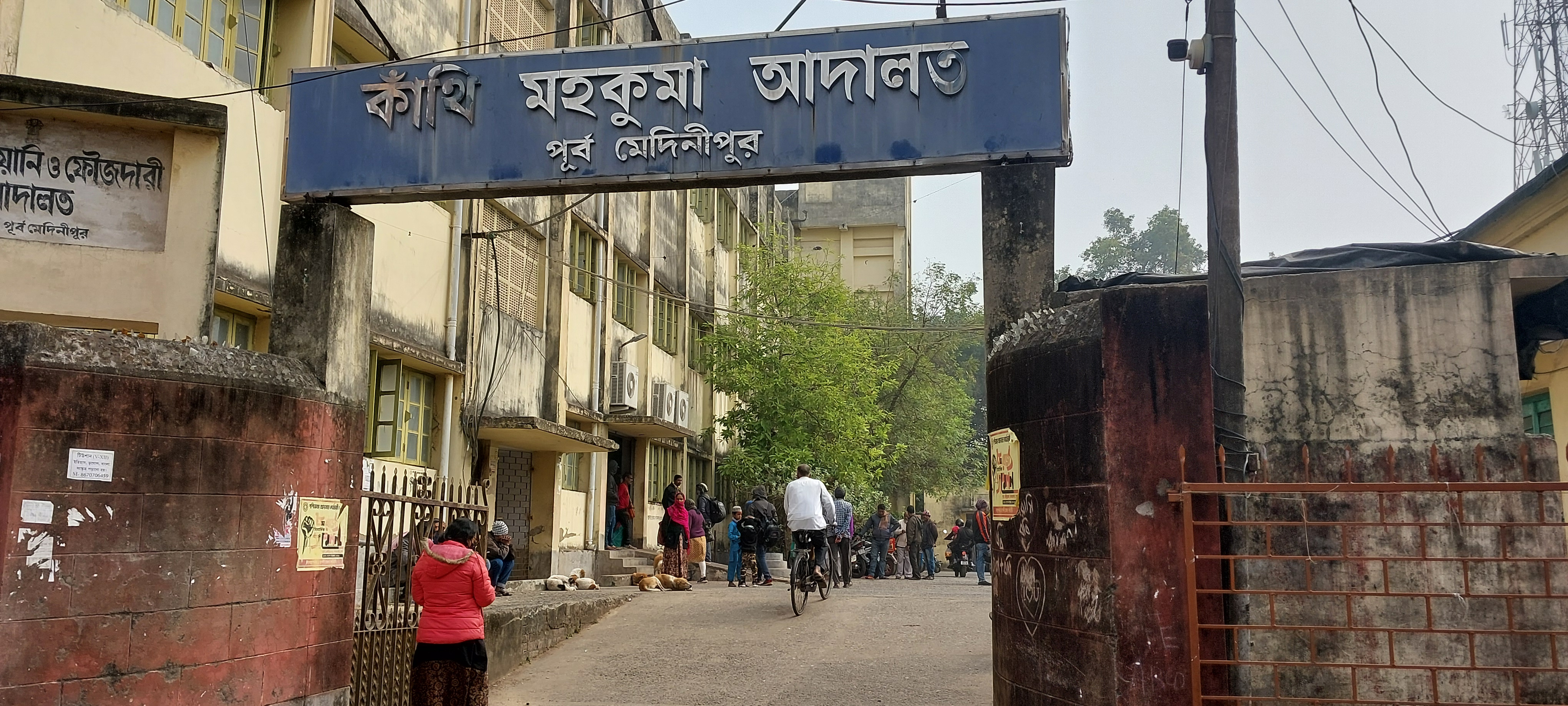
Contai Sub divisional Court

Located at the heart of the town, Contai police station has jurisdiction over Contai I and Deshapran CD Blocks. It covers an area of 370.80 km^{2} with a population of 382,216. Contai Women police station was opened on 18 March 2012. It has jurisdiction over Contai subdivision.

== Economy ==
Contai is famous for its tourism, cashew crop, fishing and processing industries. Fishing is the predominant high earning business apart from Cashew processing in Contai. Many people are associated with Prawn cultivation. Processing of dry fish is also practised in certain regions. The cultivation fields are generally outside the main town. Paddy is the main food crop cultivated in Contai. Cashew processing industry is mainly practised in the areas in and around Majna, a village 5 km off Contai town. It is the second highest paddy producing district in West Bengal. The land is highly fertile and therefore, agriculture is also the major driving force that sustains the middle-class economy of this region. However, sometimes agriculture is affected by frequent floods due to torrential monsoon rains and cyclones formed from depressions in the Bay of Bengal. A major portion of the towns dwellers are associated with business. Businessmen still form the major number of workforce in the main town. The main bazaar of Contai town is Contai Super Market. Apart from that there are New Market, Raja Bazaar, and unorganized market distributed throughout. Popular tourist attractions like Digha, Mandarmani, Junput, Tajpur, Sankarpur are near the area of Contai Subdivision. Petuaghat, the biggest fishing port of Asia is located near Contai.

== Transportation ==
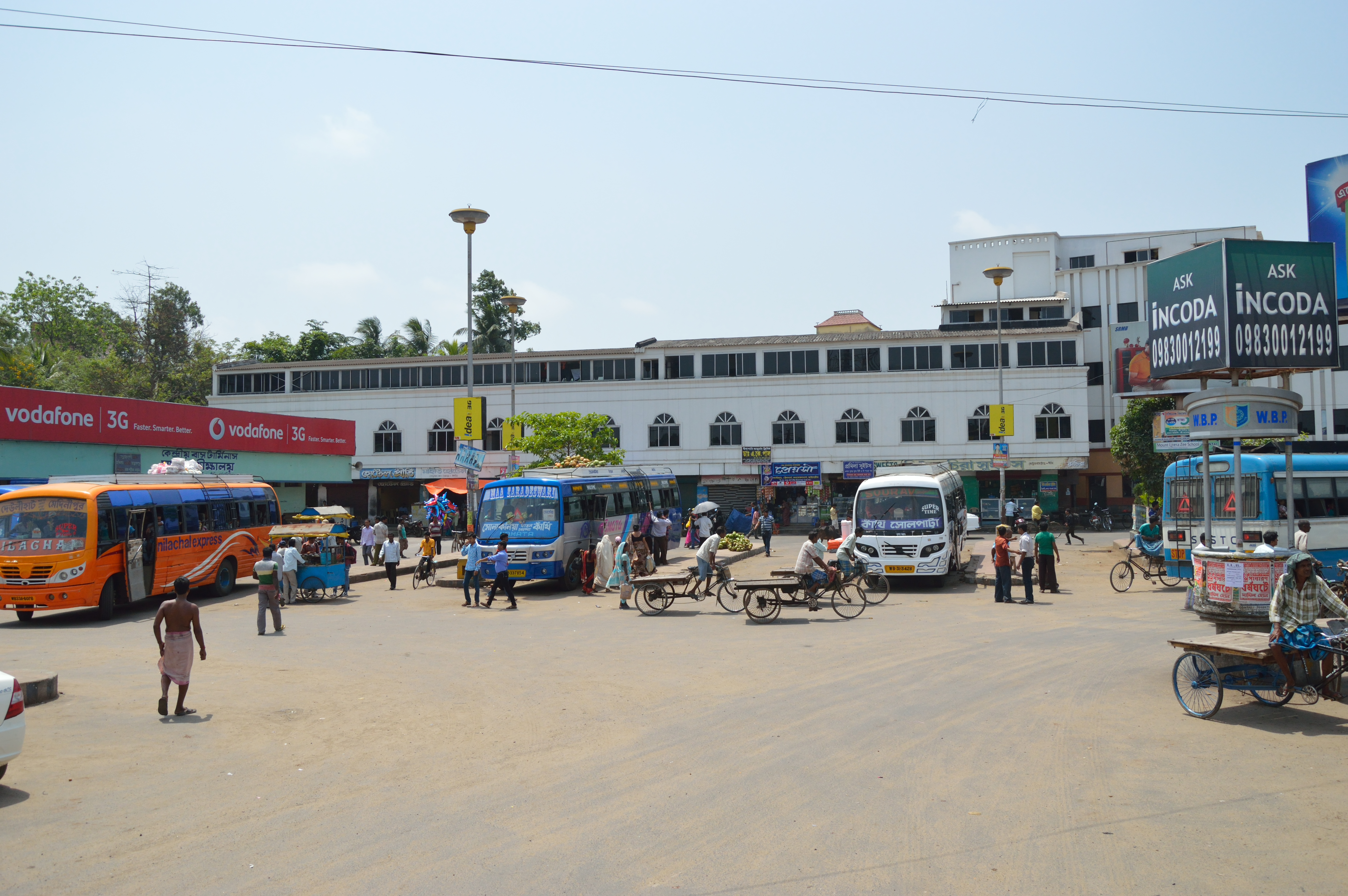
Central Bus Terminus, Conta

Contai is well connected by roads/highways with other nearby cities and towns and several important junctions like, Digha, Dantan, Jhargram, Kharagpur, Midnapore, Tamluk, Haldia, Howrah and Kolkata. Kanthi railway station is connected by a rail link to Howrah/Kolkata which is again extended to Digha. Kandari Express, Tamralipta Express and Howrah–Digha Super AC Express connects Kolkata and Contai. Local trains are available too. Contai is directly connected by rail to Asansol, Malda Town and Siliguri of West Bengal, Puri of Odisha and Vishakapatnam of Andhra Pradesh. The rail line is believed to have given a rise to the local economy. For local transportation, bus, mini-bus, taxi and much eco-friendly options like toto, autos and cycle rickshaws are available.

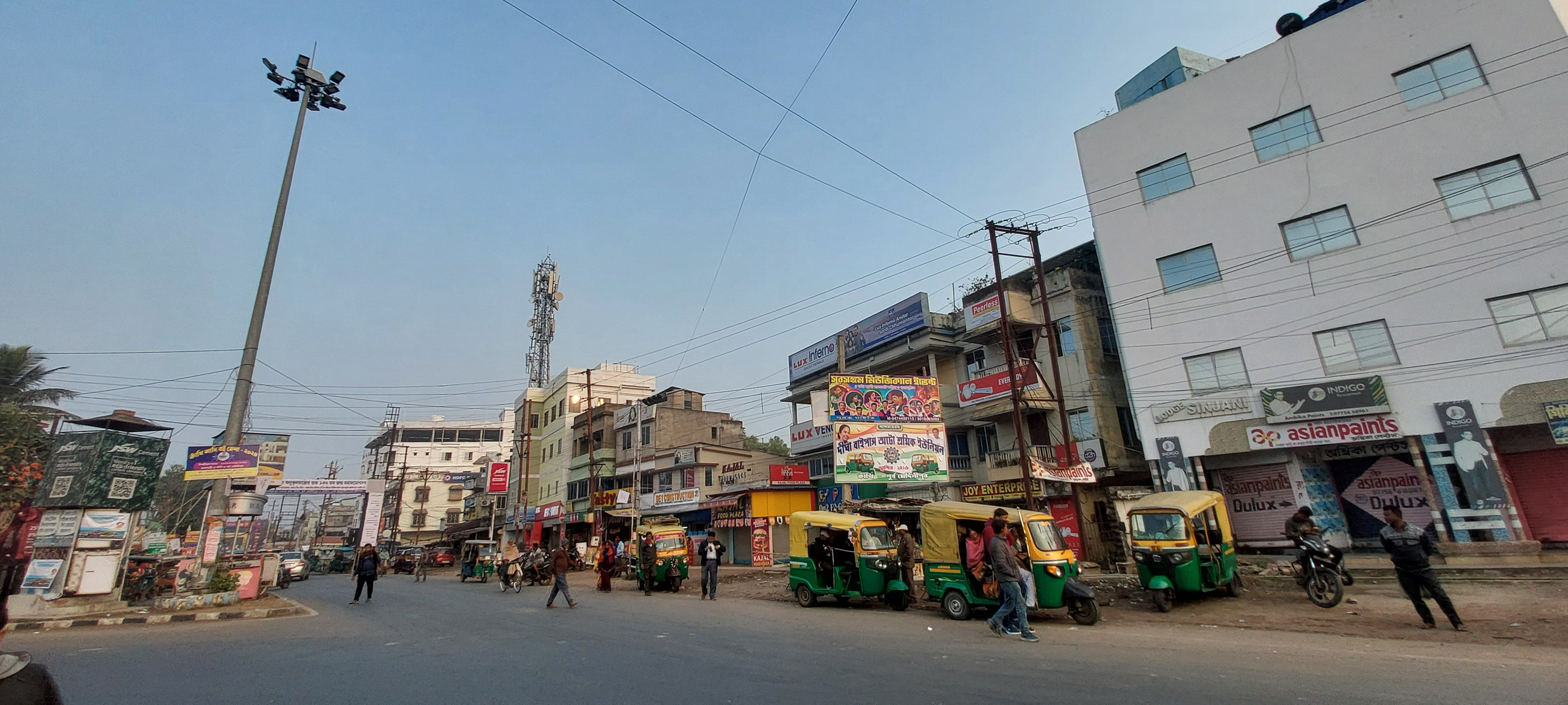
Contai more, Digha Kolkata Highway

The opening of Central Central Bus Terminus has eased the traffic congestion within the town to a great deal. The NH-116B from Nandakumar to Digha which passes through Contai was scheduled to get converted to dual road within 2020 thus enabling swifter trade, commerce and tourism.

== Education ==
There are a number of well-known schools and colleges in Contai. For higher education, besides the Prabhat Kumar College under the Vidyasagar University, there is an Ayurvedic medical college, named Raghunath Ayurved Mahavidyalaya and Hospital; a Government Polytechnic Engineering College named Contai Polytechnic; a private management college, named Contai College of Learning and Management Science; three B.Ed colleges; private ITI colleges and many more. There are plans to upgrade the Contai sub-divisional hospital into a medical college.

=== List of schools in Contai ===
- Contai Narayana School (CBSE)
- Contai Public School (ICSE & ISC)
- Contai Kshetra Mohan Bidhyabhaban (H.S.)
- Safiabad Sital Prasad Vidyamandir (H.S)
- Contai High School (H.S.)
- Contai Model Institution (H.S.)
- Contai Hindu Girls' School (H.S.)
- Contai Chandramani Brahmo Girls' School
- Contai Town Rakhal Chandra Vidyapith
- Kishorenagar Sachindra Siksha Sadan
- Kalikapur High School
- Contai Rahamania High Madrasha H/S
- Contai Muslim Girls' School
- Contai Sawkatia English Medium High Madrasha School
- Mount Litera Zee School, Contai (CBSE)
- Contai St. Paul's School
- North Point Day School
- Malabika Public School
- Contai Dishari Public School
- Mahishagote Shahid Smriti Vidyamandir
- Sabajput Sambodhi Shikshatirtha
- Nayaputra Sudhir Kumar High School

== Health ==
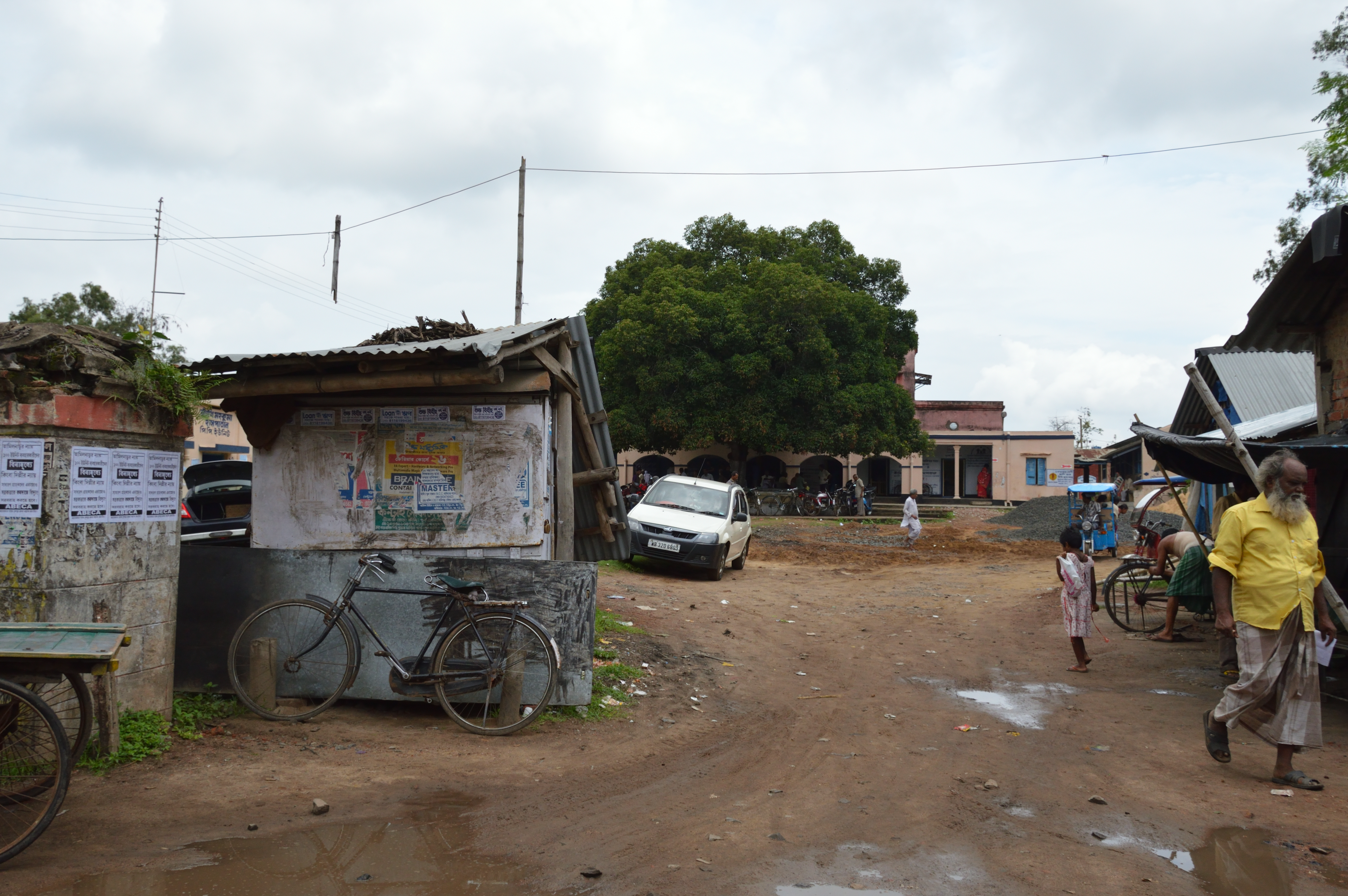
Contai Subdivisional Hospital Area

There are many hospitals in the Contai town; one is the Contai Subdivisional Hospital. People of this subdivision depend mainly on this hospital. There are also many private nursing homes.

== Culture ==
Among many festivals in Contai, "Gandhi Mela" is the most popular. It is a type of fair. It is held during January/February every year and it continues for 10 or 15 days. Many people from Contai and neighbouring subdivisions take part in "Gandhi Mela" not only for amusement but also for agricultural and industrial exhibitions. There are also some cultural institutions like Contai Bramho Samaj, Contai Harisabha, Contai Club etc. The regular Bengali festivals like Durga Puja, Saraswati Puja and Kali Puja are well attended. Other common pujas in the worship of Sitala, Jagaddhatri, Holi, Janmastami, Bheema Puja, Viswakarma also takes place. Film productions has newly seen a growth in recent years in this town. Several cultural programmes are frequently organised at the Town Hall. There is also an annual book fair held in the town. Baishakhi mela is another popular fair organised recently by the Contai Nandanik Club. There are frequent T20 tournaments held in winter in the various stadiums of Contai. Muharram Mela and Tajiya demonstration are some popular festivals in Contai observed by Muslims of the region and collectively shared and enjoyed by Hindus and other communities of the region as well. There is a competition held in Darua Karabala maidan for the best decorated Tajiya.

== Arts and crafts ==
Contai is famous for pital (brass), kansa silpo (tin) and madur silpo (mat made of a kind of grass).

== Notable people ==
- Birendranath Sasmal, nationalist Barrister
- Madhusudan Jana, doctor, journalist, teacher and social worker
- Sudhir Chandra Das, politician
- Suvendu Adhikari, former member of Lok Sabha, 9th Chief Minister of West Bengal
- Sisir Adhikari, member of the Lok Sabha, former Minister of State of Govt. of India
- Tuhina Das, Bengali actress

== Tourist spots ==
- Kapalkundala Temple, Dariapur
- Dariapur Light House
- Nimak Mahal
- Brahmo Samaj, Contai
