= Khejuri =

Khejuri Khajuri
- Village
- Location in West Bengal, India Khejuri (India)
- Coordinates: 21.861511°N 87.950552°E
- Country: India
- State: West Bengal
- District: Purba Medinipur

Population (2011)
  - Total: 7,471

Languages
  - Official: Bengali, English
- Time zone: UTC+5:30 (IST)
- Lok Sabha constituency: Kanthi
- Vidhan Sabha constituency: Khejuri
- Website: purbamedinipur.gov.in

Khejuri (also spelled Khajuri) is a village and gram panchayat, in Khejuri II CD Block in Contai subdivision of Purba Medinipur district in the state of West Bengal, India.

== History ==
According to Binoy Ghosh, in an era when the Magh and Portuguese pirates raided the area and wild animals roamed around, the place was made suitable for human habitation in the early years of the East India Company's rule. Calcutta (later Kolkata) was just coming up and did not have a port till then. Large ocean-going ships used to drop anchor in the sea near by and load and unload goods. In the 18th century, with the establishment of the makeshift ‘port’ at Khejuri, there came up an Agent’s House and a Port Office. Khejuri developed as a place of rest and a meeting point for foreign sailors, complete with lively taverns. It also developed as a place where people came to recoup their health. It was an era when places such as Darjeeling, Puri and Gopalpur had not developed as health resorts. Except for a few dilapidated buildings and a British Cemetery, nothing remains of the old establishments. As Kolkata developed, Khejuri faded away. The rich and colourful life of yester-years is no more there, but the descendants of the Pundra-kshatriyas and Mahishyas, who had laid the foundations for development of Khejuri, are still there.

== Geography ==
Cities and towns in Contai subdivision of Purba Medinipur district
M: municipal city/ town, CT: census town, R: rural/ urban centre, H: historical/ religious centre, S: port, sea-beach
Owing to space constraints in the small map, the actual locations in a larger map may vary slightly

=== Location ===
Khajuri is located at 21.861511°N 87.950552°E.

=== Urbanisation ===
93.55% of the population of Contai subdivision live in the rural areas. Only 6.45% of the population live in the urban areas and it is considerably behind Haldia subdivision in urbanization, where 20.81% of the population live in urban areas.

Note: The map alongside presents some of the notable locations in the subdivision. All places marked in the map are linked in the larger full screen map.

== Demographics ==
As per 2011 Census of India Khajuri had a total population of 7,471 of which 3,854 (52%) were males and 3,617 (48%) were females. Population below 6 years was 1,079. The total number of literates in Khajuri was 5,278 (82.57% of the population over 6 years).

== Police station ==
Khejuri police station is located at Janka.

== Education ==
The nearest degree college, Khejuri College at Baratala was established in 1999.

== Healthcare ==
Silaberia Rural Hospital at Silaberia (with 30 beds) is the main medical facility in Khejuri II CD block. There is a primary health centre at Janka (with 10 beds).

=== Notable Peoples ===
Basanta Kumar Das politician and freedom fighter and take part in constitution of India formation. Ranajit Mondal Politician. Santanu Pramanik Politician.
