= Sheikh Mujibur Rahman (Indian politician) =

West Bengal politician

Member of West Bengal Legislative Assembly
- In office 2006–2011
- Preceded by: Dipak Bera
- Succeeded by: Sangram Kumar Dolai
- Constituency: Moyna

Personal details
- Born: 18 April 1953 (age 73) Midnapore district, West Bengal
- Party: Communist Party of India (Marxist)
- Education: Tamralipta Mahavidyalaya
- Alma mater: University of Calcutta

Sheikh Mujibur Rahman is an Indian politician belonging to the Communist Party of India (Marxist). He was the MLA of Moyna Assembly constituency in the West Bengal Legislative Assembly.

== Early life and family ==
Mujibur Rahman was born on 18 April 1953 to a Bengali family of Muslim Sheikhs in Basanta Chak, Midnapore district, West Bengal. He is the son of Sheikh Rustam Ali. Rahman studied at the Gokulnagar Trilochan Vidyapith and Tamralipta Mahavidyalaya. He holds Master of Arts and Bachelor of Education degrees from the University of Calcutta.

== Career ==
Mujibur Rahman was a member of the Moyna Panchayet Samiti, Purta Sthayi Samtiti and Karmadhakshya. He contested in the 2006 West Bengal Legislative Assembly election where he ran as an Indian National Congress candidate for Moyna Assembly constituency, defeating Trinamool politician Prafulla Kumar Barai. He was a member of the Standing Committee on Public Works and Public Health Engineering.
