= Tilkhoja =

- Gram Panchayat, Village
- Location within West Bengal Location within India
- Coordinates: 22.27024°N 87.774655°E
- Country: India
- State: West Bengal
- District: Purba Medinipur
- Elevation: 8 m (26 ft)

Population (2011)
  - Total: 5,766

Languages
  - Official: Bengali, English
- Time zone: UTC+5:30 (IST)
- ISO 3166 code: IN-WB
- Vidhan Sabha constituency: Moyna
- Website: purbamedinipur.gov.in

Tilkhoja is a village and Gram Panchayat located in Moyna Tehsil/ Block of Purba Medinipur district in the Indian state of West Bengal hosting 1318 families. Moyna is the nearest town.

== Demographics ==
Tilkhoja Gram Panchayat had a 2011 population of 5766. Of them, 3086 are males. While 2680 are females as per Population Census 2011. The number children aged 0–6 was 624 or 10.82%. The sex ratio was 868 females per 1000 males, lower than the state, which was 950. The ratio for children was 841, lower than the state average of 956.

Tilkhoja Gram Panchayat has higher literacy than West Bengal at 88.49% compared to 76.26% of West Bengal. Male literacy was 92.25% while female literacy was 84.18%.

Tilkhoja Gram Panchayat is constituted by 2 villages named Tilkhoja and Janaberia.
