= Silaberia =

Silaberia Sillaberya, Shillya Beria
- Village
- Location in West Bengal, India Silaberia (India)
- Coordinates: 21.8385°N 87.9015°E
- Country: India
- State: West Bengal
- District: Purba Medinipur

Population (2011)
  - Total: 1,183

Languages
  - Official: Bengali, English
- Time zone: UTC+5:30 (IST)
- PIN: 721431 (Sillaberya)
- Telephone/STD code: 03228
- Lok Sabha constituency: Kanthi
- Vidhan Sabha constituency: Khejuri
- Website: purbamedinipur.gov.in

Silaberia (also spelled as Sillaberya, Shilla Berya) is a village in Khejuri II CD block in Contai subdivision of Purba Medinipur district in the state of West Bengal, India.

== Geography ==
Cities and towns in Contai subdivision of Purba Medinipur district
M: municipal city/ town, CT: census town, R: rural/ urban centre, H: historical/ religious site, S: port, sea-beach
Owing to space constraints in the small map, the actual locations in a larger map may vary slightly

=== Location ===
Silaberia is located at 21.8385°N 87.9015°E .

=== Urbanisation ===
93.55% of the population of Contai subdivision live in the rural areas. Only 6.45% of the population live in the urban areas and it is considerably behind Haldia subdivision in urbanization, where 20.81% of the population live in urban areas.

Note: The map alongside presents some of the notable locations in the subdivision. All places marked in the map are linked in the larger full screen map.

== Demographics ==
As per 2011 Census of India Shilla Berya had a total population of 1,183 of which 604 (51%) were males and 579 (49%) were females. Population below 6 years was 153. The total number of literates in Shilla Berya was 867 (84.17% of the population over 6 years).

== Transport ==
Silaberia is on the Shyampur-Gopichak Road.

== Healthcare ==
Silaberia Rural Hospital at Silaberia (with 30 beds) is the main medical facility in Khejuri II CD block. There is a primary health centre at Janka (with 10 beds).
