= Khejuri II =

- Community development block
- Interactive map of Khejuri II
- Coordinates: 21.8575100°N 87.9115520°E
- Country: India
- State: West Bengal
- District: Purba Medinipur

Area
  - Total: 137.46 km^{2} (53.07 sq mi)
- Elevation: 4 m (13 ft)

Population (2011)
  - Total: 139,463
  - Density: 1,014.6/km^{2} (2,627.7/sq mi)

Languages
  - Official: Bengali, English
- Time zone: UTC+5:30 (IST)
- PIN: 721431 (Janka)
- Area code: 03210
- ISO 3166 code: IN-WB
- Vehicle registration: WB-29, WB-30, WB-31, WB-32, WB-33
- Literacy: 85.37%
- Lok Sabha constituency: Kanthi
- Vidhan Sabha constituency: Khejuri
- Website: purbamedinipur.gov.in

Khejuri II is a Community Development Block that forms an administrative division in Contai subdivision of Purba Medinipur district in the Indian state of West Bengal.

== History ==
=== Khijri ===
Khijri (or Khejuri) today is a small village about 125 kilometres south of Calcutta on the right bank of the Hooghly River.

Sixteenth century maps project an emerging island in the area. Seventeenth-century maps show two islands – Khejuri and Hijli. The entire area was submerged under water. Long embankments have been built to keep the saline water away and the land recovered with great effort. In the days of the Nawabs of Bengal, this area had many salt pans. In the early days of the East India Company, the port and the town flourished at Khejuri.

In the first half of the 19th century it was known to the British as Kedgeree. The British established their control over the area in 1765 and by 1780 had established a port and factory there.

A light-house was built in 1810 at Dariapur, a village about five miles south of Khejuri. It is near the mouth of the Rasulpur River. It stood 75 feet high and was visible for 15 miles. It still exists today and works though not required by any mariner or ships. People from various parts of India come to visit this historical place. It's also here where Bankim Chandra Chatterjee's novel's Kapalkundala Temple is situated. Sagar Light House is located 13 miles away across the river on Sagar Island. Kaukhali light-house was abandoned in 1925.

Raja Rammohun Roy sailed for England from Khejuri port in 1825.

Later in the 18th century the British established the post office that was one of the most important and oldest post offices in Bengal. Vessels sailing to Calcutta from elsewhere would generally stop there to land their mail for onward carriage to Calcutta by land. (Adverse tides or winds might otherwise delay the mail's arrival by vessel.) The postmaster at Kedgeree maintained a small fleet of row boats to meet arriving and departing vessels, collecting mail from the arrivals and sending last minute mails on the departures.

In 1851-52, the British government laid an underwater telegraph cable 2,070 yards long across up the Hooghly at Diamond Harbour, and another, 1,400 yards long, across the Haldi River at Kedgeree.

Unfortunately, on 5 October 1864, a terrible cyclone came ashore directly on Kedgeree. The cyclone destroyed the town, port and the surrounding area as far as Calcutta. It also killed 60,000 people in the region and destroyed more than 160 vessels as it brought with it a wave of water some 25 to 30 feet above the high-water mark. Khijri never recovered from the devastation. The cyclone was probably the single largest disaster ever to hit British shipping.

The town contains an old Khejuri British Cemetery where Europeans who died on shipboard on the way to Calcutta are buried. Many of the headstones are still legible and the oldest dates from circa 1800.

As Kolkata grew in importance Khejuri lost its usefulness to the British.

=== Political battleground ===
Khejuri was a Left Front stronghold for about two decades till the Nandigram movement. As those who were opposed to the land acquisition policy of the Left Front government started protesting in the Khejuri area, in 2007, terror was unleashed by the CPI(M) cadres, then in command of the region and many had to flee the area. For a long time Khejuri was used by CPI(M) activists as a launching pad for attacks on Nandigram. After a long struggle between CPI(M) and Trainamool Congress for control of Khejuri, it came under control of the latter. CPI(M) has made attempts to recapture Khejuri but failed. As of 2011, the situation continued to be tense with many people forced out of the area.

The CPI (M) had reopened many of its offices in Khejuri during the run-up to the 2016 assembly elections, with the assurance from the Election Commission. The sitting MLA Ranajit Mondal of Trinamool Congress defeated Ashim Mondal, an independent backed by the Left-Congress alliance by 42,485 votes in the Khejuri seat. Once the central forces, who had come for the elections, left, Khejuri was back again in to violence-torn life. The CPI (M) closed its offices and around 150 of its supporters fled from the village again. The Trinamool Congress said that those who were directly involved in violence during the land movement had fled.

== Geography ==
Purba Medinipur district is part of the lower Indo-Gangetic Plain and Eastern Coastal Plains. Topographically, the district can be divided into two parts – (a) almost entirely flat plains on the west, east and north, (b) the coastal plains on the south. The vast expanse of land is formed of alluvium and is composed of younger and coastal alluvial. The elevation of the district is within 10 metres above mean sea level. The district has a long coastline of 65.5 km along its southern and south eastern boundary. Five coastal CD Blocks, namely, Khejuri II, Contai II (Deshapran), Contai I, Ramnagar I and II, are occasionally affected by cyclones and tornadoes. Tidal floods are quite regular in these five CD Blocks. Normally floods occur in 21 of the 25 CD Blocks in the district. The major rivers are Haldi, Rupnarayan, Rasulpur, Bagui and Keleghai, flowing in north to south or south-east direction. River water is an important source of irrigation. The district has a low 899 hectare forest cover, which is 0.02% of its geographical area.

Janka, a constituent panchayat of Khejuri II block, is located at 21°51′27″N 87°54′42″E.

Khejuri II CD Block is bounded by Nandigram I CD Block in the north, Sagar CD Block, in South 24 Parganas district, across the Hooghly estuary/ Bay of Bengal, in the east, Contai II CD Block in the south and Khejuri I CD Block in the west.

It is located 51 km from Tamluk, the district headquarters.

Khejuri II CD Block has an area of 137.46 km^{2}. It has 1 panchayat samiti, 5 gram panchayats, 90 gram sansads (village councils), 99 mouzas and 97 inhabited villages. Khejuri police station serves this block. Headquarters of this CD Block is at Janka.

The entire area is subject to recurring cyclones and floods.

Gram panchayats of Khejuri II block/ panchayat samiti are: Baratala, Haludbari, Janka, Khejuri and Nijkasba.

== Demographics ==
=== Population ===
As per 2011 Census of India Khejuri II CD Block had a total population of 139,463, all of which were rural. There were 71,294 (51%) males and 68,169 (49%) females. Population below 6 years was 18,537. Scheduled Castes numbered 79,149 (56.95%) and Scheduled Tribes numbered 900 (0.65%).

As per 2001 census, Khejuri II block had a total population of 117,409, out of which 60,130 were males and 57,279 were females. Khejuri II block registered a population growth of 17.82 per cent during the 1991-2001 decade. Decadal growth for the combined Midnapore district was 14.87 per cent. Decadal growth in West Bengal was 17.84 per cent.

Large villages (with 4,000+ population) in Khejuri II CD Block (2011 census figures in brackets): Dekhali (9,619), Serkhan Chak (7,347), Pankhai (4,269) and Khajuri (7,471).

Other villages in Khejuri II CD Block (2011 census figures in brackets): Kasaria (1,685), Janka (2,804), Baratala (3,682), Halud Bari (2,849), Nijkashba (2,435). Sundarpur (1943)

Sundarpur village has higher literacy rate than that of the whole West Bengal. In 2011, literacy rate of Sundarpur was 86.22% compared to 76.26% of total West Bengal; the male literacy rate of the village being 92.59% and that of the female being 79.56%. It is said that the literacy rate developed because of Sudhir Chandra Sarkar(1929 - 2004) a resident of Sundarpur. He was a distinguished educationist, a philanthropist and the then Headmaster of Hijli Gopichak High School situated in the village of Gopichak about 2 kilometres east of Sundarpur.

=== Literacy ===
As per 2011 census the total number of literates in Khejuri II CD Block was 103,149 (85.37% of the population over 6 years) out of which 56,101 (54%) were males and 47,048 (46%) were females.

As per 2011 census, literacy in Purba Medinipur district was 87.02%. Purba Medinipur had the highest literacy amongst all the districts of West Bengal in 2011.

See also – List of West Bengal districts ranked by literacy rate

Literacy in CD blocks of
Purba Medinipur district
Tamluk subdivision
Tamluk – 87.06%
Sahid Matangini – 86.99%
Panskura I – 83.65%
Panskura II – 84.93%
Nandakumar – 85.56%
Chandipur – 87.81%
Moyna – 86.33%
Haldia subdivision
Mahishadal – 86.21%
Nandigram I – 84.89%
Nandigram II – 89.16%
Sutahata – 85.42%
Haldia – 85.96%
Contai subdivision
Contai I – 89.32%
Contai II – 88.33%
Contai III – 89.88%
Khejuri I – 88.90%
Khejuri II – 85.37%
Ramnagar I – 87.84%
Ramnagar II – 89.38%
Bhagabanpur II – 90.98%
Egra subdivision
Bhagabanpur I – 88.13%
Egra I – 82.83%
Egra II – 86.47%
Patashpur I – 86.58%
Patashpur II – 86.50%
2011 Census: CD Block Wise

Primary Census Abstract Data

=== Language and religion ===
Religion in Khejuri II CD block (2011)
Hinduism	92.29%
Islam	7.55%
Other or not stated	0.16%

In 2011 census Hindus numbered 128,714 and formed 92.29% of the population in Khejuri II CD Block. Muslims numbered 10,521 and formed 7.55% of the population. Others numbered 228 and formed 0.16% of the population. In 2001, Hindus made up 92.89% and Muslims 7.07% of the population respectively.

Bengali is the predominant language, spoken by 99.82% of the population.

== Rural poverty ==
The District Human Development Report for Purba Medinipur has provided a CD Block-wise data table for Modified Human Poverty Index of the district. Khejuri II CD Block registered 27.21 on the MHPI scale. The CD Block-wise mean MHPI was estimated at 24.78. Eleven out of twentyfive CD Blocks were found to be severely deprived in respect of grand CD Block average value of MHPI (CD Blocks with lower amount of poverty are better): All the CD Blocks of Haldia and Contai subdivisions appeared backward, except Ramnagar I & II, of all the blocks of Egra subdivision only Bhagabanpur I appeared backward and in Tamluk subdivision none appeared backward.

== Economy ==
=== Livelihood ===
In Khejuri II CD Block in 2011, total workers formed 33.83% of the total population and amongst the class of total workers, cultivators formed 19.64%, agricultural labourers 37.84%, household industry workers 3.24% and other workers 39.28.%.

=== Infrastructure ===
There are 97 inhabited villages in Khejuri II CD block. All 97 villages (100%) have power supply. 83 villages (85.57%) have drinking water supply. 23 villages (23.71%) have post offices. 77 villages (79.38%) have telephones (including landlines, public call offices and mobile phones). 29 villages (29.90%) have a pucca (paved) approach road and 35 villages (36.08%) have transport communication (includes bus service, rail facility and navigable waterways). 22 villages (22.68%) have agricultural credit societies. 6 villages (6.19%) have banks.

In 2007-08, around 40% of rural households in the district had electricity.

In 2013-14, there were 42 fertiliser depots, 7 seed stores and 19 fair price shops in the CD Block.

=== Agriculture ===
Persons engaged in agriculture
in Khejuri II CD Block
1. Bargadars (14.6%)
2. Patta holders (10.8%)
3. Small farmers (2.09%)
4. Marginal farmers (43.2%)
5. Agricultural labourers (29.3%)

According to the District Human Development Report of Purba Medinipur: The agricultural sector is the lifeline of a predominantly rural economy. It is largely dependent on the Low Capacity Deep Tubewells (around 50%) or High Capacity Deep Tubewells (around 27%) for irrigation, as the district does not have a good network of canals, compared to some of the neighbouring districts. In many cases the canals are drainage canals which get the backflow of river water at times of high tide or the rainy season. The average size of land holding in Purba Medinipur, in 2005-06, was 0.73 hectares against 1.01 hectares in West Bengal.

In 2013-14, the total area irrigated in Khejuri II CD Block was 4,728 hectares, out of which 60 hectares were irrigated by canal water, 3,265 hectares by tank water (there were 14,155 tanks in Khejuri II CD Block), 1,360 hectares by deep tube well, 18 hectares by shallow tube well and 25 hectares by other means.

Although the Bargadari Act of 1950 recognised the rights of bargadars to a higher share of crops from the land that they tilled, it was not implemented fully. Large tracts, beyond the prescribed limit of land ceiling, remained with the rich landlords. From 1977 onwards major land reforms took place in West Bengal. Land in excess of land ceiling was acquired and distributed amongst the peasants. Following land reforms land ownership pattern has undergone transformation. In 2013-14, persons engaged in agriculture in Khejuri II CD Block could be classified as follows: bargadars 14.56%, patta (document) holders 10.85%, small farmers (possessing land between 1 and 2 hectares) 2.09%, marginal farmers (possessing land up to 1 hectare) 43.18% and agricultural labourers 29.32%.

In 2013-14, Khejuri II CD Block produced 10,998 tonnes of Aman paddy, the main winter crop, from 8,478 hectares, 3,416 tonnes of Boro paddy, the spring crop, from 1,020 hectares and 10,472 tonnes of potatoes from 374 hectares. It also produced pulses and oilseeds.

Betelvine is a major source of livelihood in Purba Medinipur district, particularly in Tamluk and Contai subdivisions. Betelvine production in 2008-09 was the highest amongst all the districts and was around a third of the total state production. In 2008-09, Purba Mednipur produced 2,789 tonnes of cashew nuts from 3,340 hectares of land.

Concentration of Handicraft Activities in CD Blocks
- Horn Craft - Kolaghat
- Pata Chitra - Chandipur, Nandakumar
- Sea Shell – Ramnagar I & II
- Mat & Mat Diversified Products – Ramnagar I, Egra I & II, Patashpur I
- Brass & Bell Metal – Ramnagar I, Mahisadal, Patashpur II, Egra I
- Diversified Jute Products – Ramnagar II, Nandakumar, Kolaghat, Shahid Matangini
- Cane & Bamboo Products - Chandipur, Nandakumar, Kolaghat, Shahid Matangini
- Sola Craft - Tamluk, Kolaghat
- Pottery/Terracotta - Panskura, Tamluk, Sahid Matangini, Nandakumar
- Wood Craft - Tamluk
- Zari work- Sutahta, Mahisadal, Haldia, Nandakumar

Source: District Human Development Report, Purba Medinipur, Page 97

=== Pisciculture ===
Purba Medinipur's net district domestic product derives one fifth of its earnings from fisheries, the highest amongst all the districts of West Bengal. The nett area available for effective pisciculture in Khejuri II CD Block in 2013-14 was 705.38 hectares. 3,730 persons were engaged in the profession and approximate annual production was 26,875 quintals.

=== Banking ===
In 2013-14, Khejuri II CD Block had offices of 5 commercial banks.

=== Backward Regions Grant Fund ===
Medinipur East district is listed as a backward region and receives financial support from the Backward Regions Grant Fund. The fund, created by the Government of India, is designed to redress regional imbalances in development. As of 2012, 272 districts across the country were listed under this scheme. The list includes 11 districts of West Bengal.

== Transport ==
Khejuri II CD Block has 3 ferry services, 24 originating/ terminating bus routes. The nearest railway station is 24 km from the CD Block headquarters.

== Education ==
In 2013-14, Khejuri II CD Block had 96 primary schools with 2,619 students, 4 middle schools with 959 students, 9 high schools with 7,370 students and 5 higher secondary schools with 8,338 students. Khejuri II CD Block had 273 institutions for special and non-formal education with 12,855 students.

As per the 2011 census, in Khejuri II CD block, amongst the 97 inhabited villages, 8 villages did not have a school, 45 villages had two or more primary schools, 23 villages had at least 1 primary and 1 middle school and 14 villages had at least 1 middle and 1 secondary school.

Khejuri College at Baratala was established in 1999. In addition to courses in arts, it offers a course in Aquaculture Management and Technology.

== Healthcare ==
In 2014, Khejuri II CD Block had 1 block primary health centre, 1 primary health centre and 1 private nursing home with total 48 beds and 4 doctors (excluding private bodies). It had 20 family welfare sub centres. 2,533 patients were treated indoor and 61,972 patients were treated outdoor in the hospitals, health centres and subcentres of the CD Block.

Silaberia Rural Hospital at Silaberia (with 30 beds) is the main medical facility in Khejuri II CD block. There is a primary health centre at Janka (with 10 beds).
