= Goasafat =

Goasafat Garsafat
- Census Town
- Location in West Bengal, India Goasafat (India)
- Coordinates: 22.24921°N 87.79546°E
- Country: India
- State: West Bengal
- District: Purba Medinipur

Area
  - Total: 1.12 km^{2} (0.43 sq mi)

Population (2011)
  - Total: 6,597
  - Density: 5,890/km^{2} (15,300/sq mi)

Languages
  - Official: Bengali, English
- Time zone: UTC+5:30 (IST)
- PIN: 721629
- ISO 3166 code: IN-WB
- Vehicle registration: WB
- Lok Sabha constituency: Tamluk
- Vidhan Sabha constituency: Moyna
- Website: purbamedinipur.gov.in

Goasafat (also referred as Garsafat) is a census town in Moyna CD Block in Purba Medinipur district in the Indian state of West Bengal.

== Geography ==
Cities and towns in Tamluk subdivision of Purba Medinipur district
M: municipal city/ town, CT: census town, R: rural/ urban centre, H: historical/ religious centre
Owing to space constraints in the small map, the actual locations in a larger map may vary slightly

=== Location ===
Goasafat is located at 22.24921°N 87.79546°E.

=== Urbanisation ===
94.08% of the population of Tamluk subdivision live in the rural areas. Only 5.92% of the population live in the urban areas, and that is the second lowest proportion of urban population amongst the four subdivisions in Purba Medinipur district, just above Egra subdivision.

Note: The map alongside presents some of the notable locations in the subdivision. All places marked in the map are linked in the larger full screen map.

== Demographics ==
As per 2011 Census of India Goasafat had a total population of 6,597 of which 3,438 (52%) were males and 3,159 (48%) were females. Population below 6 years was 821. The total number of literates in Goasafat was 4,819 (83.43% of the population over 6 years).

As of 2001 India census, Goasafat had a population of 5,406. Males constitute 52% of the population and females 48%. Goasafat has an average literacy rate of 65%, higher than the national average of 59.5%: male literacy is 70%, and female literacy is 59%. In Goasafat, 17% of the population is under 6 years of age.

== Infrastructure ==
As per the District Census Handbook 2011, Goasafat covered an area of 1.12 km^{2}. It had the facility of a railway station at Tamluk 20 km away and bus routes in the town. Amongst the civic amenities it had 300 domestic electric connections. Amongst the medical facilities it had a hospital 7 km away. Amongst the educational facilities it had were 4 primary schools. The nearest middle school, secondary school and senior secondary school were at Anandapur closeby. Amongst the recreational and cultural facilities 2 cinema theatres, a public library and a reading room were there in the town.

== Transport ==
Goasafat is on Tangrakhali Road.
