= Subrata Paik =

Indian politician (born 1971)

Member of the West Bengal Legislative Assembly
- Incumbent
- Assumed office 2026
- Preceded by: Santanu Pramanik
- Constituency: Khejuri Assembly constituency

Personal details
- Born: 1971 (age 54–55) Khejuri, Purba Medinipur district, West Bengal, India
- Party: Bharatiya Janata Party

Subrata Paik (born 1971) is an Indian politician from West Bengal. He is a member of West Bengal Legislative Assembly from the Khejuri Assembly constituency, which is reserved for Scheduled Caste community, in Purba Medinipur district representing the Bharatiya Janata Party.

== Early life and education ==
Paik is from Khejuri, Purba Medinipur district, West Bengal. He is the son of Balmiki Paik. He studied at Amrit Bharati Vidhyabhaban till 1993, and later passed Class 12. He is into cultivation. He declared assets worth Rs.16 lakhs in his affidavit to the Election Commission of India.

== Career ==
Paik won the Khejuri Assembly constituency representing the Bharatiya Janata Party in the 2026 West Bengal Legislative Assembly election. He polled 1,29,875 votes and defeated his nearest rival, Rabin Chandra Mondal of the All India Trinamool Congress, by a margin of 32,690 votes.
