= Ardhendu Maity =

Indian politician

Ardhendu Maity (4 March 1953) is an Indian politician from West Bengal. He is a former two time member of the West Bengal Legislative Assembly from Bhagabanpur Assembly constituency in Purba Medinipur district. He was last elected in the 2016 West Bengal Legislative Assembly election representing the All India Trinamool Congress.

== Early life and education ==
Maity is from Bhagabanpur, Purba Medinipur district, West Bengal. He is the son of Baikuntha Maity. He completed his BA in 1974 and later did his LLB at the University of Calcutta in 1982. He is an advocate.

== Career ==
Maity was first elected as an MLA in the Bhagabanpur Assembly constituency representing All India Trinamool Congress in the 2011 West Bengal Legislative Assembly election. He polled 93,845 votes and defeated his nearest rival, Ranjit Manna of the Samajwadi Party, by a margin of 8,997 votes. He retained the seat for the Trinamool Congress winning the 2016 West Bengal Legislative Assembly election where he polled 111,201 votes and beat his closest opponent, Hemangshu Shekhar Mahapatra of the Indian National Congress, by a margin of 31,943 votes. He contested the 2021 West Bengal Legislative Assembly election, also on a Trinamool ticket, but lost to Rabindranath Maity of the Bharatiya Janata Party, by a margin of 27,549 votes.
