= Pijush Kanti Das =

Indian politician (born 1956)

Pijush Kanti Das (born 1956) is an Indian politician from West Bengal. He is a member of the West Bengal Legislative Assembly from the Chandipur, West Bengal Assembly constituency in Purba Medinipur district representing the Bharatiya Janata Party.

== Early life ==
Das is from Chandipur, Purba Medinipur district, West Bengal. He is the son of the late Pramatha Nath Das. He completed his DGO at a college affiliated with Calcutta University in 1987. He has a private practice and also runs his own business. He declared assets worth Rs. 11 crore in his affidavit to the Election Commission of India.

== Career ==
Das won the Chandipur Assembly constituency representing the Bharatiya Janata Party in the 2026 West Bengal Legislative Assembly election. He polled 1,26,047 votes and defeated his nearest rival, Uttam Barik of the All India Trinamool Congress by a margin of 20,270 votes.
