= Srikantha, Purba Medinipur =

Coordinates: 22°17′9″N 87°46′45″E

Srikantha is a village in Moyna Tehsil in Purba Medinipur district in West Bengal State in India. Srikantha is 5.1 km from its Tehsil Main Town Moyna. Srikantha is 30.8 km from its District Main City Tamluk, and 68 km from its State Main City Kolkata. Srikantha Pin Code is 721629 and post office name is Srikantha.

Moyna, Bakcha, Gojina, Gokulnagar, Moyna-I, Moyna-Ii, are the villages along with this village in the same Moyna Tehsil. Nearby villages are Tilkhoja (1.6 km), Kalagechhia (6.5 km), Paramanandapur (7.5 km), Gojina (8 km), Raghunathbari (8.5 km). Nearby towns are Moyna (5.1 km), Panskura-I (14.6 km), Tamluk (16.2 km), Shahid Matangini (17.9 km).
