= Baratala =

- Village
- Location in West Bengal, India Baratala (India)
- Coordinates: 21.9145°N 87.9265°E
- Country: India
- State: West Bengal
- District: Purba Medinipur

Population (2011)
  - Total: 3,680

Languages
  - Official: Bengali, English
- Time zone: UTC+5:30 (IST)
- Lok Sabha constituency: Kanthi
- Vidhan Sabha constituency: Khejuri
- Website: purbamedinipur.gov.in

Baratala is a village and a gram panchayat, in Khejuri II CD Block in Contai subdivision of Purba Medinipur district in the state of West Bengal, India.

== Geography ==
Cities and towns in Contai subdivision of Purba Medinipur district
M: municipal city/ town, CT: census town, R: rural/ urban centre, H:historical/ religious centre S: port, sea-beach
Owing to space constraints in the small map, the actual locations in a larger map may vary slightly

=== Location ===
Baratala is located at 21.9145°N 87.9265°E.

=== Urbanisation ===
93.55% of the population of Contai subdivision live in the rural areas. Only 6.45% of the population live in the urban areas and it is considerably behind Haldia subdivision in urbanization, where 20.81% of the population live in urban areas.

Note: The map alongside presents some of the notable locations in the subdivision. All places marked in the map are linked in the larger full screen map.

== Demographics ==
As per 2011 Census of India Baratala had a total population of 3,680 of which 1,892 (51%) were males and 1,790 (49%) were females. Population below 6 years was 484. The total number of literates in Baratala was 2,648 (82.80% of the population over 6 years).

== Transport ==
Baratala is on the Lalat-Janka Road.

== Education ==
Khejuri College at Baratala was established in 1999. In addition to courses in arts, it offers a course in Aquaculture Management and Technology.
