= Khejuri British Cemetery =

Cemetery in West Bengal

Details
- Established: 1800
- Location: Khejuri, Purba Medinipur district, West Bengal
- Country: India
- Type: Christian cemetery

Khejuri British Cemetery, also known as the Kedgeree Burial Ground, is a colonial-era cemetery situated at Khejuri the Purba Medinipur district of the Indian state of West Bengal. Presently the cemetery exists in a ruined condition.

== History ==
During the late eighteenth century, Khejuri or Kedgeree developed into an important port of East India Company beside the Hooghly River prior to establishment of Port of Kolkata. This cemetery was established in 1800 to bury Europeans who died while serving at Kedgeree port or aboard ships approaching Calcutta. Initially there were 33 graves. These memorials and tombs were built from 1800 to 1865.

== Notable graves ==
- Emelia Maxwell
- J. Botelho
- Emos West
- W. A Chammer
- Charlotte Ann
