= Amiya Kanti Bhattacharjee =

Indian politician

Amiya Kanti Bhattacharjee (born 29 March 1953), also known as Kablu, is an Indian politician from West Bengal. He is a former two time member of the West Bengal Legislative Assembly from Chandipur, West Bengal Assembly constituency in Purba Medinipur district. He won the 2011 and 2016 West Bengal Legislative Assembly election representing the All India Trinamool Congress.

== Early life and education ==
Bhattacharjee is from Medinipur, Purba Medinipur district, West Bengal. He is the son of late Sudhangshu Bhattacharjee. He studied Class 12 at Gopinath High School and passed the examinations under the West Bengal Council of Higher Secondary Education in 1971. Later, he discontinued his studies. His wife is a member of the Purba Medinipur Zilla Parishad.

== Career ==
Bhattacharjee was first elected as an MLA from the Chandipur, West Bengal Assembly constituency representing the All India Trinamool Congress in the 2011 West Bengal Legislative Assembly election. He polled 88,010 votes and defeated his nearest rival, Bidyut Guchait of the Communist Party of India (Marxist) by a margin of 11,709 votes. He retained the seat for the All India Trinamool Congress winning the 2016 West Bengal Legislative Assembly election. He polled votes and beat his closest opponent Mangal Chand Pradhan, also of the Communist Party, by a margin of 9,654 votes.
