= Bhagabanpur Assembly constituency =

Bhagabanpur
- Constituency No. 214 for the West Bengal Legislative Assembly
- Interactive Map Outlining Bhagabanpur Assembly Constituency

Constituency details
- Country: India
- Region: East India
- State: West Bengal
- District: Purba Medinipur
- Lok Sabha constituency: Kanthi
- Established: 1957
- Total electors: 2,54,184
- Reservation: None

Member of Legislative Assembly
- 18th West Bengal Legislative Assembly
- Incumbent Santanu Pramanik
- Party: BJP
- Alliance: NDA
- Elected year: 2026

Bhagabanpur Assembly constituency is an assembly constituency in Purba Medinipur district in the Indian state of West Bengal.

== Overview ==
As per orders of the Delimitation Commission, No. 214 Bhagabanpur Assembly constituency is composed of the following: Bhagabanpur, Kajlagarh, Kotbarh and Shimulia gram panchayats of Bhagabanpur I community development block, Arjunnagar, Basudevberia, Baroj, Itaberia, Jukhia, Mugberia and Radhapur gram panchayats of Bhagabanpur II community development block, and Argoyal and Mathura gram panchayats of Patashpur II community development block.

Bhagabanpur Assembly constituency is part of No. 31 Kanthi (Lok Sabha constituency).

== Members of the Legislative Assembly ==
Year	M.L.A.	Party
1957	Basanta Kumar Panda	PSP
1957	Bhikhari Mondal	INC
1962	Abha Maiti	INC
1967	Abha Maiti	INC
1969	Abha Maiti	INC
1971	Prasanta Kumar Pradhan	CPI
1972	Amalesh Jana	INC
1977	Haripada Jana	JP
1982	Prasanta Pradhan	CPI
1987	Prasanta Pradhan	CPI
1991	Prasanta Pradhan	CPI
1996	Ajit Khanra	INC
2001	Ardhendu Maity	AITC
2006	Ardhendu Maity	AITC
2011	Ardhendu Maity	AITC
2016	Ardhendu Maity	AITC
2021	Rabindranath Maity	Bharatiya Janata Party
2026	Santanu Pramanik	Bharatiya Janata Party

== Election results ==
=== 2026 ===
In the 2026 election, Santanu Pramanik of BJP defeated his nearest rival, Manab Kumar Parua of Trinamool Congress.

2026 West Bengal Legislative Assembly election: Bhagabanpur
Party	Candidate	Votes	%	±%
BJP	Santanu Pramanik	130,586	52.73	−1.83
AITC	Manab Kumar Parua	109,708	44.30	+2.11
RSP	Prativa Rani Kar Shasmal	3,665	1.48	
NOTA	None of the above	701	0.28	−0.18
Majority		20,878	8.43	−3.94
Turnout		247,653	93.7	+6.11
BJP hold		Swing		

=== 2021 ===
In the 2021 election, Rabindranath Maity of BJP defeated his nearest rival, Ardhendu Maity of Trinamool Congress.

West Bengal assembly elections, 2021: Bhagabanpur
Party	Candidate	Votes	%	±%
BJP	Rabindranath Maity	121,480	54.56	
AITC	Ardhendu Maity	93,931	42.19	
INC	Shiu Maiti	5,274	2.37	
NOTA	None of the above	1,019	0.46	
Majority		27,549	12.37	
Turnout		222,650	87.59	
BJP gain from AITC		Swing		

=== 2016 ===
In the 2016 election, Ardhendu Maity of Trinamool Congress defeated his nearest rival, Hemangshu Shekhar Mahapatra of Indian National Congress.

West Bengal assembly elections, 2016: Bhagabanpur
Party	Candidate	Votes	%	±%
AITC	Ardhendu Maity	111,201	54.18	+3.03
INC	Hemangshu Shekhar Mahapatra	79,258	38.62	
BJP	Prasanta Panda	7,802	3.80	+1.21
Independent	Priyabrata Dutta	1,634	0.80	
BSP	Ansar Ali Sk.	1,621	0.79	
SUCI(C)	Ashoktaru Pradhan	1,259	0.61	
NOTA	None of the above	1,149	0.56	
Bharat Nirman Party	Goutam Pradhan	763	0.37	
ABHM	Thakurdas Mandal	540	0.26	
Turnout		205,227	88.22	−4.14
AITC hold		Swing		

=== 2011 ===
In the 2011 election, Ardhendu Maity of Trinamool Congress defeated his nearest rival Ranajit Manna of SP.

West Bengal assembly elections, 2011: Bhagabanpur
Party	Candidate	Votes	%	±%
AITC	Ardhendu Maity	93,945	51.15	−0.87#
SP	Ranjit Manna	84,948	46.25	−0.05
BJP	Sadananda De	4,763	2.59	
Turnout		183,656	92.36	
AITC hold		Swing	-0.92#	

.# Swing calculated on Congress+Trinamool Congress vote percentages taken together in 2006.

=== 2006 ===
In the 2006 and 2001 state assembly elections, Ardhendu Maity of Trinamool Congress won the Bhagabanpur assembly seat defeating his nearest rivals Gour Kanti Bal and Prasanta Pradhan, both of CPI(M), in respective years. Contests in most years were multi cornered but only winners and runners are being mentioned. Ajit Khanra of Congress defeated Prasanta Pradhan of CPI(M) in 1996. Prasanta Pradhan of CPI(M) defeated Asoktaru Panda of Congress in 1991, Haripada Jana of Congress in 1987 and Ramkrishna Sarkar of Congress in 1982. Haripada Jana of Janata Party defeated Prasanta Pradhan of CPI(M) in 1977.

=== 1972 ===
Amales Jana of Congress won in 1972. Prasanta Kumar Pradhan of CPI(M) won in 1971. Abha Maiti of Congress won in 1969, 1967 and 1962. In 1957 Bhagabanpur had a dual seat. It was won by Basanta Kumar Panda of PSP and Bhikhari Mondal of Congress.
