= Janka, Contai =

Janka
- Village
- Location in West Bengal, India Janka (India)
- Coordinates: 21°50′51.0″N 87°54′05.4″E
- Country: India
- State: West Bengal
- District: Purba Medinipur

Population (2011)
  - Total: 2,804

Languages
  - Official: Bengali, English
- Time zone: UTC+5:30 (IST)
- Lok Sabha constituency: Kanthi
- Vidhan Sabha constituency: Khejuri
- Website: purbamedinipur.gov.in

Janka is a village, in Khejuri II CD block in Contai subdivision of Purba Medinipur district in the state of West Bengal, India. Khejuri police station is located at Janka.

== Geography ==
Cities and towns in Contai subdivision of Purba Medinipur district
M: municipal city/ town, CT: census town, R: rural/ urban centre, H: historical/ religious site, S: port, sea-beach
Owing to space constraints in the small map, the actual locations in a larger map may vary slightly

=== Police station ===
Khejuri police station is located at Janka. It has jurisdiction over Khejuri I and Khejuri II CD Blocks. It covers an area of 268.47km^{2} with a population of 231,777.

=== CD block HQ ===
The headquarters of Khejuri II CD block are located at Janka.

=== Urbanisation ===
93.55% of the population of Contai subdivision live in the rural areas. Only 6.45% of the population live in the urban areas and it is considerably behind Haldia subdivision in urbanization, where 20.81% of the population live in urban areas.

Note: The map alongside presents some of the notable locations in the subdivision. All places marked in the map are linked in the larger full screen map.

== Demographics ==
As per 2011 Census of India Janka had a total population of 2,804 of which 1,452 (52%) were males and 1,352 (48%) were females. Population below 6 years was 347. The total number of literates in Janka was 2,214 (90.11% of the population over 6 years).

== Healthcare ==
There is a primary health centre at Janka (with 10 beds).
