= Sangram Kumar Dolai =

Indian politician

Member of the West Bengal Legislative Assembly
- In office 2016–2021
- Preceded by: Bhusan Chandra Dolai
- Succeeded by: Ashok Dinda
- Constituency: Moyna

Personal details
- Party: Trinamool Congress
- Education: N.R.S. Medical College and Hospital
- Profession: Politician, Doctor

Sangram Kumar Dolai is an Indian politician from West Bengal. He was elected as a Member of the Legislative Assembly in 2016 West Bengal Legislative Assembly election from Moyna, as a member of the Trinamool Congress.
