= Rabindranath Maity =

Indian politician

Member of the West Bengal Legislative Assembly
- In office 2 May 2021 – 4 May 2026
- Preceded by: Ardhendu Maity
- Succeeded by: Santanu Pramanik
- Constituency: Bhagabanpur

Personal details
- Party: Bharatiya Janata Party
- Education: 12th Pass
- Profession: Contractor

Rabindranath Maity is an Indian politician from Bharatiya Janata Party. In May 2021, he was elected as a member of the West Bengal Legislative Assembly from Bhagabanpur (constituency). He defeated Ardhendu Maity of All India Trinamool Congress by 27,549 votes in the 2021 West Bengal Assembly election.
