= Chandipur, Purba Medinipur =

Chandipur
- Village
- Location in West Bengal, India Chandipur (India)
- Coordinates: 22°05′31.9″N 87°51′22.3″E
- Country: India
- State: West Bengal
- District: Purba Medinipur

Population (2011)
  - Total: 2,343

Languages
  - Official: Bengali, English
- Time zone: UTC+5:30 (IST)
- PIN: 721659 (Mathchandipur)
- Telephone/STD code: 03228
- Lok Sabha constituency: Kanthi
- Vidhan Sabha constituency: Chandipur
- Website: purbamedinipur.gov.in

Chandipur (Caṇḍīpura, Bengali pronunciation: [t͡ʃoɳɖipuɾ]) is a village, in Chandipur CD block in Tamluk subdivision of Purba Medinipur district in the state of West Bengal, India.

== Geography ==
Cities and towns in Tamluk subdivision of Purba Medinipur district
M: municipal city/ town, CT: census town, R: rural/ urban centre, H: historical/ religious centre
Owing to space constraints in the small map, the actual locations in a larger map may vary slightly

=== Police station ===
Chandipur police station has jurisdiction over Chandipur CD block. Chandipur police station covers an area of 138.86 km^{2} with a population of 188,065.

=== CD block HQ ===
The headquarters of Chandipur CD block are located at Chandipur.

=== Urbanisation ===
94.08% of the population of Tamluk subdivision live in the rural areas. Only 5.92% of the population live in the urban areas, and that is the second lowest proportion of urban population amongst the four subdivisions in Purba Medinipur district, just above Egra subdivision.

Note: The map alongside presents some of the notable locations in the subdivision. All places marked in the map are linked in the larger full screen map.

== Demographics ==
As per 2011 Census of India Chandipur had a total population of 2,343 of which 1,186 (51%) were males and 1,157 (49%) were females. Population below 6 years was 217. The total number of literates in Chandipur was 2,025 (95.25% of the population over 6 years).

== Transport ==
SH 4 connecting Jhalda (in Purulia district) and Digha (in Purba Medinipur district) passes through Chandipur.

There is a road linking Chandipur and Nandigram.

Lavan Satyagraha Smarak railway station is situated on the Tamluk-Digha line,

== Healthcare ==
Erashal Rural Hospital at Erashal, PO Math Chandipur (with 30 beds) is the main medical facility in Chandipur CD block. There are primary health centres at Gokhuri, PO Majnaberia (with 2 beds) and Baraghuni (with 10 beds).
