= Jatiya Unnayan Party =

- Abbreviation: JUP
- Leader: Syed Ruhul Amin
- President: Syed Ruhul Amin
- Founded: 2024
- Headquarters: West Bengal, India
- Ideology: Regional politics Minority rights
- Colours: Green and White
- ECI status: Registered unrecognised

Election symbol
- Registered unrecognised party (free symbols allotted during elections)

Website
- jupnational.org

The Jatiya Unnayan Party (abbreviated as JUP; Bengali: জাতীয় উন্নয়ন পার্টি) is an Indian regional political party active in the state of West Bengal. The outfit was established around 2024 by Pirzada Syed Ruhul Amin, a prominent religious and social figure from Medinipur, and is officially listed as a registered unrecognised political party by the Election Commission of India (ECI).

== History ==
Following its formal registration with the Election Commission of India, the party gained widespread media visibility in February 2026 during preparations for the West Bengal Legislative Assembly elections.

The party attracted media scrutiny primarily due to its acronym "JUP", which mirrored another emerging state outfit, the Janata Unnayan Party, founded around the same time by former minister and rebel Trinamool Congress leader Humayun Kabir. This naming similarity led to intense speculation among political commentators concerning the possible fragmentation of minority votes across southern Bengal. In response to accusations from political rivals alleging the party to be a proxy or "B-team" intended to cut votes, party president Pirzada Syed Ruhul Amin dismissed the claims, affirming the organisation's administrative autonomy and distinct electoral path.

== Ideology and platform ==
Although founded by a prominent Pirzada with significant following in the minority belt, the party leadership has asserted that its political program is inclusive rather than sectarian. The stated platform of the party places primary emphasis on rural development, agricultural welfare, basic civic infrastructure, and equitable socio-economic justice for backward classes throughout rural Bengal.

== Electoral activity ==
The party entered electoral contests by fielding candidates in assembly elections and by-elections across West Bengal under the ECI's unrecognised party regulations. Official nomination filings confirm the party's participation in key constituencies such as the Nandigram Assembly segment, where candidate affidavits were processed by the election commission.

In February 2026, the party announced plans to contest approximately fifteen assembly segments in the general state elections, prioritizing seats across Purba Medinipur, Paschim Medinipur, Howrah, and parts of the Kolkata metropolitan fringe.
