= Chandipur, West Bengal Assembly constituency =

Chandipur
- Constituency No. 211 for the West Bengal Legislative Assembly
- Interactive Map Outlining Chandipur Assembly Constituency

Constituency details
- Country: India
- Region: East India
- State: West Bengal
- District: Purba Medinipur
- Lok Sabha constituency: Kanthi
- Established: 2011
- Total electors: 2,55,924
- Reservation: None

Member of Legislative Assembly
- 18th West Bengal Legislative Assembly
- Incumbent Pijush Kanti Das
- Party: Bharatiya Janata Party
- Elected year: 2026

Chandipur Assembly constituency is an assembly constituency in Purba Medinipur district in the Indian state of West Bengal.

== Overview ==
As per orders of the Delimitation Commission, No. 211 Chandipur Assembly constituency is composed of the following: Chandipur community development block, and Benodia, Bivisanpur, Gurgram, Kakra, Mahammadpur I and Mahammadpur II gram panchayats of Bhagabanpur I community development block.

Chandipur Assembly constituency is part of No. 31 Kanthi (Lok Sabha constituency).

== Members of the Legislative Assembly ==
Year	Member	Party Affiliation
2011	Amiya Kanti Bhattacharjee	All India Trinamool Congress
2016	Amiya Kanti Bhattacharjee	All India Trinamool Congress
2021	Soham Chakraborty	All India Trinamool Congress
2026	Pijush Kanti Das	Bharatiya Janata Party

== Election results ==
=== 2026 ===
2026 West Bengal Legislative Assembly election: Chandipur
Party	Candidate	Votes	%	±%
BJP	Pijush Kanti Das	126,047	52.09	+8.38
AITC	Uttam Barik	105,777	43.72	−6.1
CPI(M)	Rita Das	6,568	2.71	−1.75
INC	Ahmed SK. Taslim	1,207	0.50	
Jatiya Unnayan Party	Ayub Khan	675	0.28	
SUCI(C)	Rita Bhowmik	642	0.27	
AJUP	Arjit Kalam Azad SK	424	0.18	
NOTA	None of the above	617	0.26	−0.07
Majority		20,270	8.37	+2.26
Turnout		241,957	94.38	+4.73
BJP gain from AITC		Swing		

=== 2021 ===
West Bengal Legislative Assembly Elections, 2021: Chandipur
Party	Candidate	Votes	%	±%
AITC	Soham Chakraborty	109,770	49.82	
BJP	Pulak Kanti Guria	96,298	43.71	
CPI(M)	Ashis Kumar Guchhait	9,837	4.46	
NOTA	None of the above	736	0.33	
Majority		13,472	6.11	
Turnout		220,327	89.65	
AITC hold		Swing		

=== 2016 ===
West Bengal assembly elections, 2016: Chandipur
Party	Candidate	Votes	%	±%
AITC	Amiya Kanti Bhattacharjee	95,982	48.52	−2.28
CPI(M)	Mangal Chand Pradhan	86,328	43.64	−0.40
BJP	Pijush Das	10,160	5.14	+2.17
BSP	Biswanath Ghorai	1,274	0.64	
Turnout		197,801	88.51	
AITC hold		Swing		

=== 2011 ===
2011 West Bengal Legislative Assembly election: Chandipur
Party	Candidate	Votes	%	±%
AITC	Amiya Kanti Bhattacharjee	88,010	50.80	
CPI(M)	Bidyut Guchait	76,301	44.04	
BJP	Chanchal Maiti	5,149	2.97	
Independent	Siraj Khan	3,780		
Turnout		173,240	91.84	
