= Ranajit Mondal =

Indian politician

Ranajit Mondal (born 21 April 1967) is an Indian politician from West Bengal. He is a former two time member of the West Bengal Legislative Assembly from Khejuri Assembly constituency in Purba Medinipur district. He won the 2011 and 2016 West Bengal Legislative Assembly election representing the All India Trinamool Congress.

== Early life and education ==
Mondal is from Khejuri, Purba Medinipur district, West Bengal. He is the son of Chiranjib Mondal. He completed his BA in 1992 at University of Calcutta. Earlier, he studied Class 12 at Ramnagar College and passed the West Bengal Board of Higher Secondary Council examinations in 1985. He is into agro business and his wife is a para teacher.

== Career ==
Mondal was elected as an MLA for the first time from Khejuri Assembly constituency in the 2011 West Bengal Legislative Assembly election representing the All India Trinamool Congress. He polled 87,833 votes and defeated his nearest rival, Asim Mondal of the Samajwadi Party, by a margin of 16,160 votes. He retained the Khejuri seat for the Trinamool Congress winning the 2016 West Bengal Legislative Assembly election. He polled 103,699 votes and beat his closest opponent, Asim Kumar Mondal, who contested this time as an Independent candidate, by a margin of 42,485 votes.
