= Santanu Pramanik =

Indian politician

Minister of State, Government of West Bengal
- Incumbent
- Assumed office 1 June 2026
- Governor: R. N. Ravi
- Chief Minister: Suvendu Adhikari

Member of West Bengal Legislative Assembly
- Incumbent
- Assumed office 4 May 2026
- Preceded by: Rabindranath Maity
- Constituency: Bhagabanpur
- In office 2 May 2021 – 4 May 2026
- Preceded by: Ranajit Mondal
- Succeeded by: Subrata Paik
- Constituency: Khejuri

Personal details
- Born: May 5, 1985 (age 41)
- Party: Bharatiya Janata Party
- Education: Masters Degree in Arts (Education)
- Alma mater: Netaji Subhas Open University
- Profession: Assistant Teacher

Santanu Pramanik (Born 5 May, 1985) is an Indian politician from Bharatiya Janata Party. In May 2021, he was elected as a member of the West Bengal Legislative Assembly from Khejuri constituency. He defeated Partha Pratim Das of All India Trinamool Congress by 17,965 votes in the 2021 West Bengal Assembly election. In May 2026, he was re-elected as a member of the West Bengal Legislative Assembly from Bhagabanpur constituency.
