= Madurkathi =

Reed-woven mats made in Bengal, India

- Geographical indication
- Alternative names: মাদুরকাঠি
- Description: Handicrafts
- Type: Handicrafts
- Area: West Bengal
- Country: India
- Registered: 28 March 2018
- Official website: ipindiaservices.gov.in

Madurkathi mats, or madur, are mats woven in West Bengal from a reed called madur kottir, or madurkathi, a sedge of the family Cyperaceae. Madur mat-making is a long-standing tradition, centred on the Medinipur district, and is an important part of the rural economy. The mats are woven mainly by weavers of the Mahishya caste, and predominantly by women. This cottage industry contributes significantly to village household income.

In Bengal, the word madur is used as a generic term for floor mats, although it designates mats woven from a specific type of reed. Mats are an integral part of the social fabric of rural Bengal, and Madurkathi mats are popularly used to sit on and as bedding. The mats are non-conductive and sweat-absorbing, making them an essential household item in West Bengal's hot and humid climate. These mats are also used for religious purposes.

On March 28, 2018, Indian Patent Office granted the Government of West Bengal a Geographical Indication (GI) Tag for madurkathi, under registration no. 567 in respect of handicrafts. The application for registration of madurkathi was filed by the Government's West Bengal Khadi & Village Industry Board.

== History ==
Mat-weaving in India dates back to the Indus Valley Civilisation. Its socio-cultural relevance is evidenced by references in ancient literature, including the Atharva Veda, the Shatapatha Brahmana, and the Mahabharata. Its historical significance is also reflected in Indian folklore, in which the saints were offered grass mats to sit on.

Records from the Medieval Period provide the first information about mat-weaving in the region of Bengal, with both ordinary and fine quality mats being produced.

The finest quality of mat, the masland, derives its name from the Persian word masnad, which means throne. Masland mats originated in the Muslim period, when the finest mats were produced in Medinipur with a silk weft, under the patronage of the royal community of that time. The Medinipur district village of Maslandpur, located close to Tamluk subdivision, probably takes its name from the masland mat.

Mats were collected as revenue under the jaigirdari system. In 1744, Nawab Alibardi Khan issued a charter to the jaigirdars in this regard. As a result, it was obligatory to supply masland mats for use in the collectorate. Permanent markets for mats were established in Medinipur. Kasijora and Narajol were the two most important centers of fine masland mat-weaving during this period. Ordinary mats were also produced.

Government officials in the British period observed that a large number of masland mats were manufactured in Medinipur. According to a census report of 1872, there were 618 skilled workers engaged in mat-making in the district of Medinipur, where mats were one of the principle articles of trade. 448,300 mats were reportedly manufactured in 1907-1908. Records of the British Raj show that, at the beginning of the 20th century, the price of masland mats was 100 Indian rupees (INR) or more. The finest quality mats at that time were made at Raghunathbari, Kasijora, and Narajol in Medinipur.

== Types ==
The weavers, mainly Mahishyas, make three types of mat:

- ekh-rokha, or single mat
- do-rokha, or double mat
- masland

Ekh-rokha is a light, thin madur mat. Do-rokha is a heavier and thicker mat, superior to ak rokha in terms of comfort and convenience. The third type, masland, is a textured mat featuring decorative patterning, and is the finest and most expensive of the three.

Madurkathi have also been used to make a variety of decorative and functional items, including door curtains, sleeping mats, tiffin-carriers, and handbags.

Typical mat specifications
Size	Large	Medium	Small
Height	45 in × 50 in (110 cm × 130 cm)	18 in × 12 in (46 cm × 30 cm)	5 in × 6 in (13 cm × 15 cm)
Weight	5 kg	2 kg	1 kg

Mats may be made in a variety of patterns. The designs are self-colored, using variation in the natural reed, and can also incorporate dyed reed patterning in black and magenta.

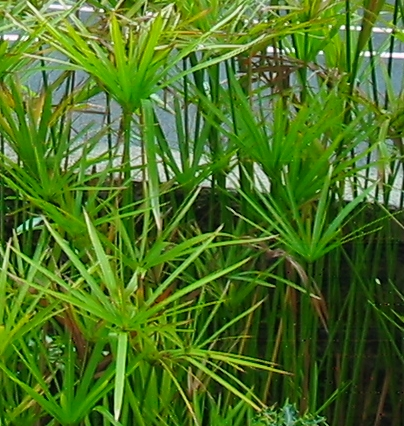
Madurkathi

== Madurkathi cultivation ==
The raw material used to make madur mats is a sedge of the genus Cyperus: Cyperus pangorei (formerly Cyperus tegetum). Known locally as madurkathi, it grows on marshy land, thriving in southern and eastern India including in the area of Medinipur.

The frequent flooding around Medinipur makes many areas unsuitable for crop cultivation. Grass, sedges and reeds provide a viable alternative for the region's farmers. As a result, cultivation of madurkathi grass and the weaving of Madur mats has become an important part of the local household economy.

== Mat production ==
=== Weaving ===
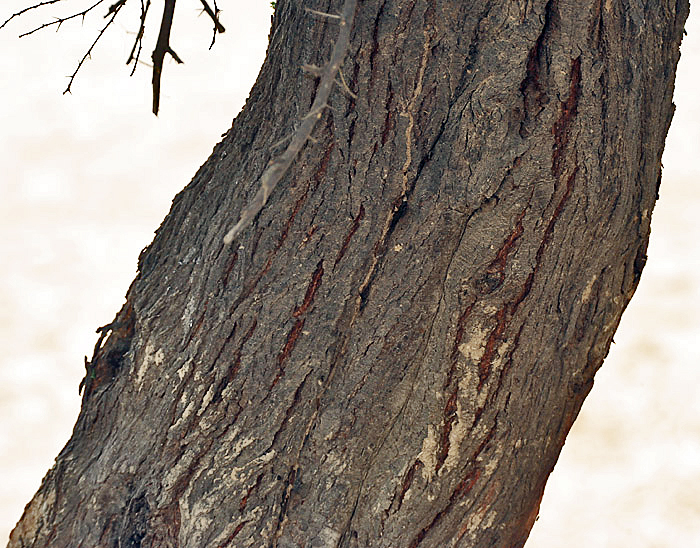
Babla tree bark

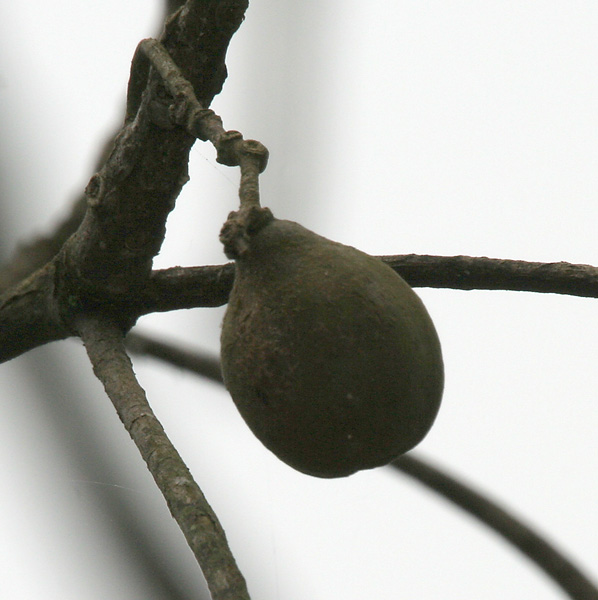
Haritaki fruit

Babla fruit and bark and haritaki fruit produce black dye

The ekh-rokha madur is the simplest of the three types of mat (ekh-rokha, do-rokha, and masland). It is produced on a simple bamboo-frame loom, using cotton thread as the warp and single reeds as the weft. The du-rokha is more complex, with a double-reed weft, and requires greater skill to produce. Masland mats are the finest products, requiring the greatest accuracy and experience to weave.

Masland mats are made with superior quality madurkathi. At least two people are required to weave these mats. One person places the reeds from left to right, alternately laying one thread on top and the next underneath. The second person repeats this from right to left. When they reach the edge, the threads are turned and the process is continued. The masland mat weaving process is very similar to the technique used to weave saris.

Popular masland mat designs include flowers, honeycomb patterns (mouchak), rhomboidal motifs (barfi), and jharna.

=== Colouring ===
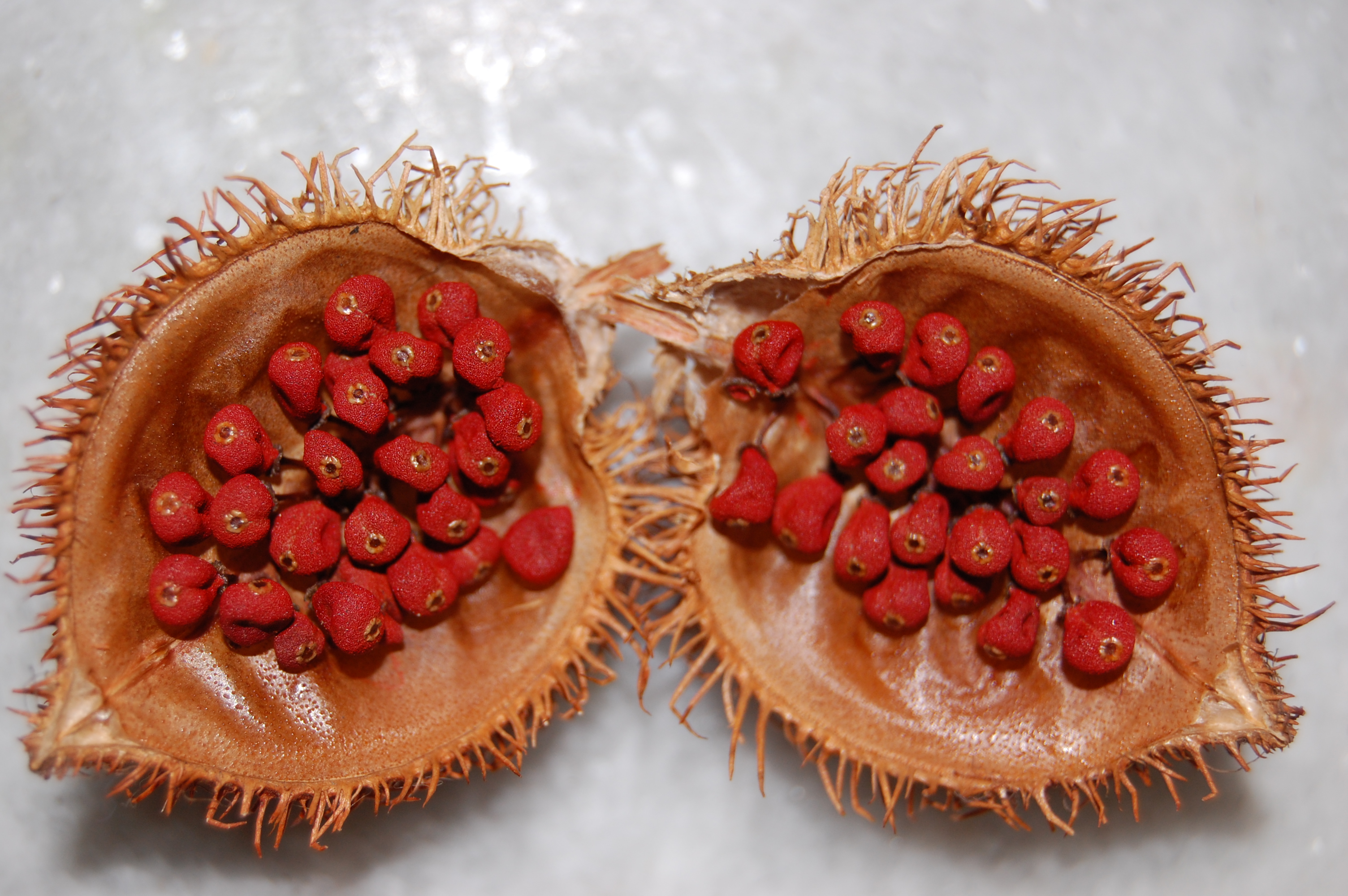
Seeds for red pigment

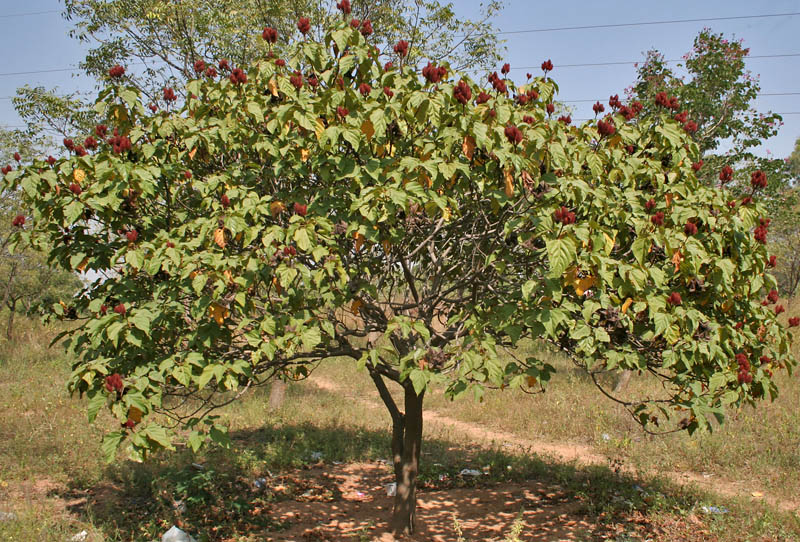
Rang gach (annatto) tree

Reddish dye is made from the rang gach (Bixa orellana)

The natural colouring of the reeds is used to weave geometric designs, creating a subtle pattern in the finished mat. Madurs are traditionally made using vegetable dyes only. Naturally sourced maroon or black vegetable dyes may be used for further decoration on mat borders.

Black dye is produced using haritaki fruit (Terminalia chebula), and the fruit and bark of the babla tree (Vachellia nilotica).

Reddish dye is made from the seeds of the Achiote, or annatto tree (Bixa orellana), native to Latin America but introduced to India by trade in the 16th and 17th centuries and cultivated mainly as a source of dye. In West Bengal, the tree is known as rang gach.

Before dyeing, mat sticks are tightly bound with palm leaves at the places where natural colour will be retained. The bundles are placed in containers filled with dye powder and cold water, which are then boiled. Boiling time differs according to the colour: 10 hours for black, and 24 hours for the reddish dye. The dyed mat sticks are sun-dried before being used for weaving.
