= Nandakumar, Purba Medinipur =

Nandakumar
- Town
- Location in West Bengal, India Nandakumar (India)
- Coordinates: 22°11′19.7″N 87°55′08.7″E
- Country: India
- State: West Bengal
- District: Purba Medinipur

Population (2011)
  - Total: 845

Languages
  - Official: Bengali, Hindi
- Time zone: UTC+5:30 (IST)
- PIN: 721632 (Nandakumar)
- Telephone/STD code: 03228
- Lok Sabha constituency: Tamluk
- Vidhan Sabha constituency: Nandakumar
- Website: purbamedinipur.gov.in

Nandakumar is a town in Nandakumar CD block in Tamluk subdivision of Purba Medinipur district in the state of West Bengal, India.

== Geography ==
Cities and towns in Tamluk subdivision of Purba Medinipur district
M: municipal city/ town, CT: census town, R: rural/ urban centre, H: historical/ religious centre
Owing to space constraints in the small map, the actual locations in a larger map may vary slightly

=== Police station ===
Nandakumar police station has jurisdiction over Nandakumar CD block. Nandakumar police station covers an area of 151.73 km^{2} with a population of 239,442. It is located at Nandakumar Bazar.

=== CD block HQ ===
The headquarters of this CD block are located at Kumarpur.

=== Urbanisation ===
94.08% of the population of Tamluk subdivision live in the rural areas. Only 5.92% of the population live in the urban areas, and that is the second lowest proportion of urban population amongst the four subdivisions in Purba Medinipur district, just above Egra subdivision.

Note: The map alongside presents some of the notable locations in the subdivision. All places marked in the map are linked in the larger full screen map.

== Demographics ==
As per the map of Nandakumar CD block and subsequent alphabetical list of villages in the District Census Handbook, Purba Medinipur, Nandakumar is a part of Kumarpur village.

As per 2011 Census of India Kumarpur had a total population of 845 of which 441 (52%) were males and 404 (48%) were females. Population below 6 years was 77. The total number of literates in Kumarpur was 643 (83.72% of the population over 6 years).

== Transport ==
Nandakumar stands at the crossing of NH 116 connecting Kolaghat and Haldia (both in Purba Medinipur district) and SH 4 connecting Jhalda (in Purulia district) and Digha (in Purba Medinipur district).

There is a separate Mechada-Tamluk-Haldia road via Sutahata and Durga Chak, that passes through Nandakumar.

Nandakumar railway station is situated on the Tamluk-Digha line,

== Healthcare ==
Khejurberia Rural Hospital at Khejurberia, PO Nandakumar (with 30 beds) is the main medical facility in Nandakumar CD block. There are primary health centres at Dakshin Damodarpur (with 10 beds) and Dakshin Gumai, PO Kalyanchak (with 2 beds).

== Nandakumar picture gallery ==
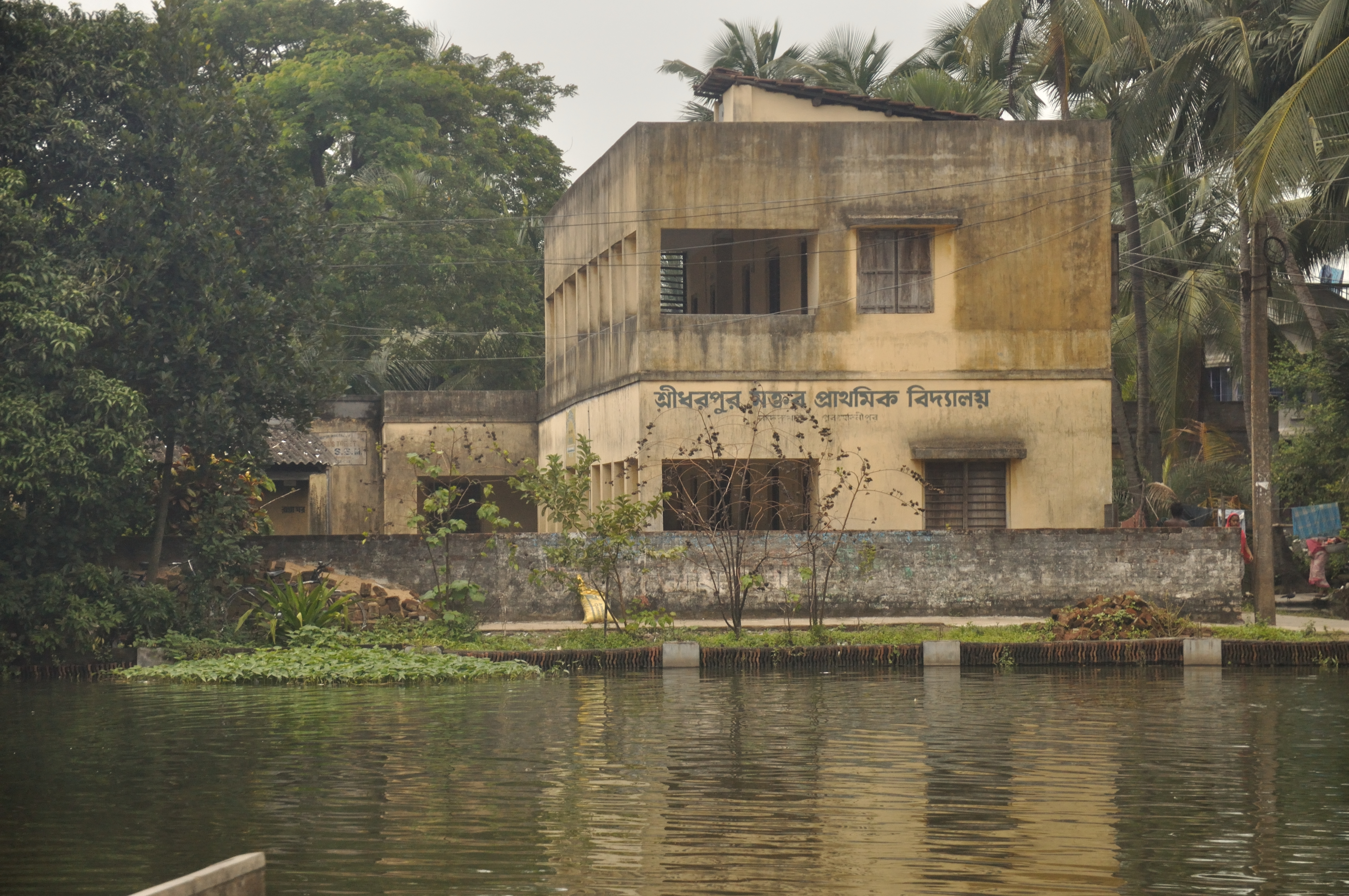
Sridharpur Maktab Prathamik Vidyalaya

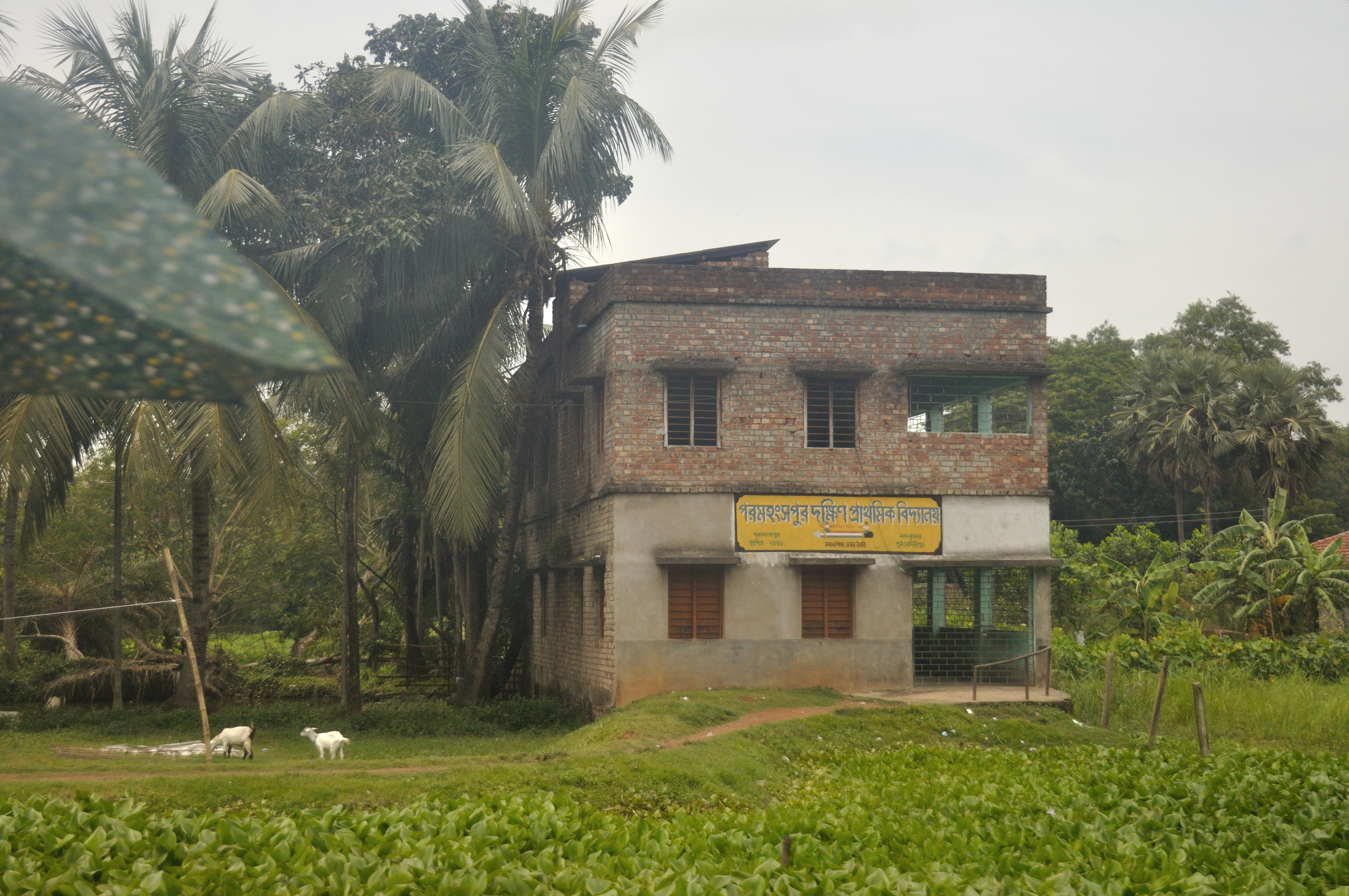
Paramhansapr Dakshin Prathamik Vidyalaya

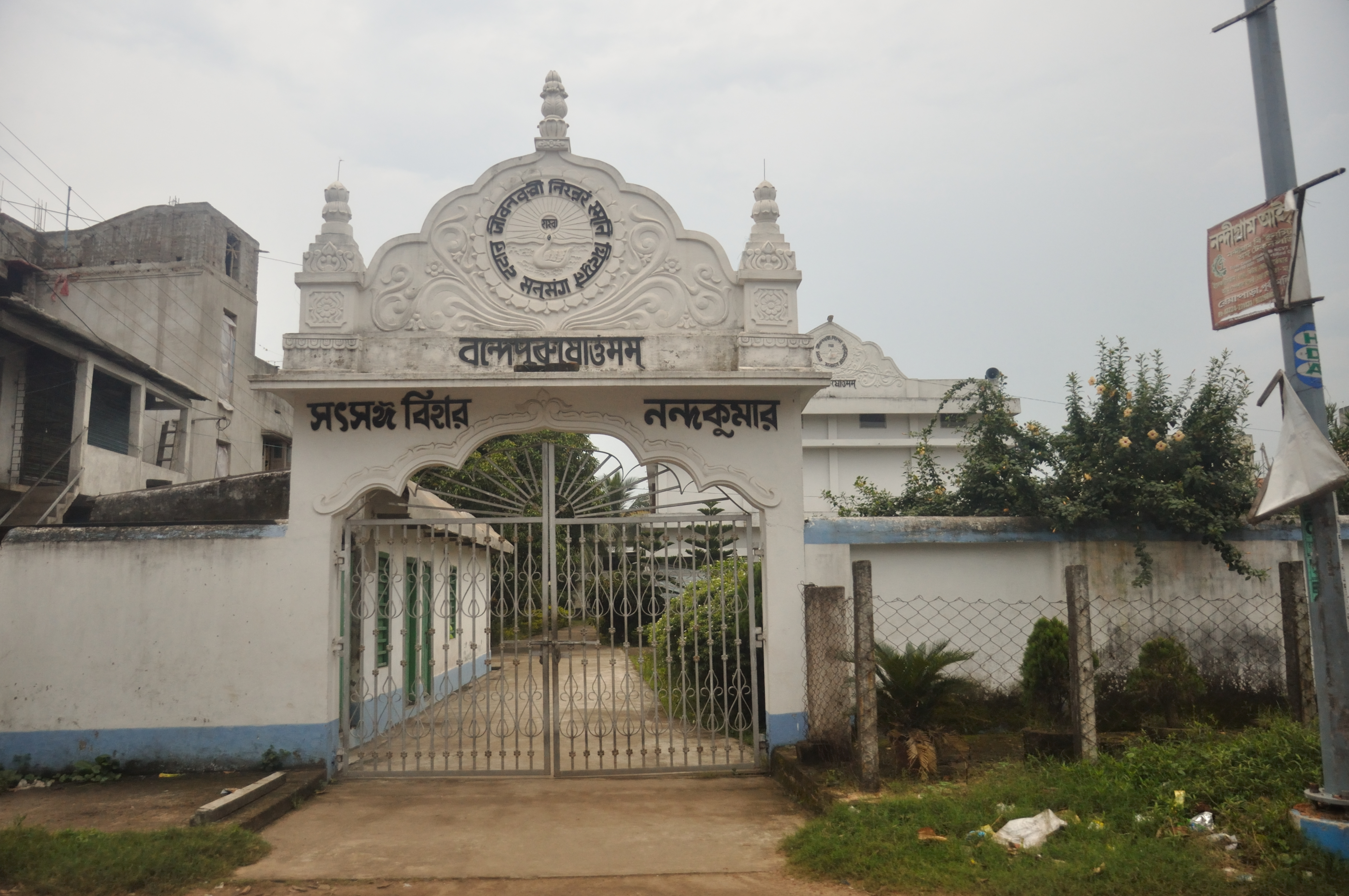
Satsang Vihar
