= Moyna (community development block) =

Moyna Moynagarh
- Community development block
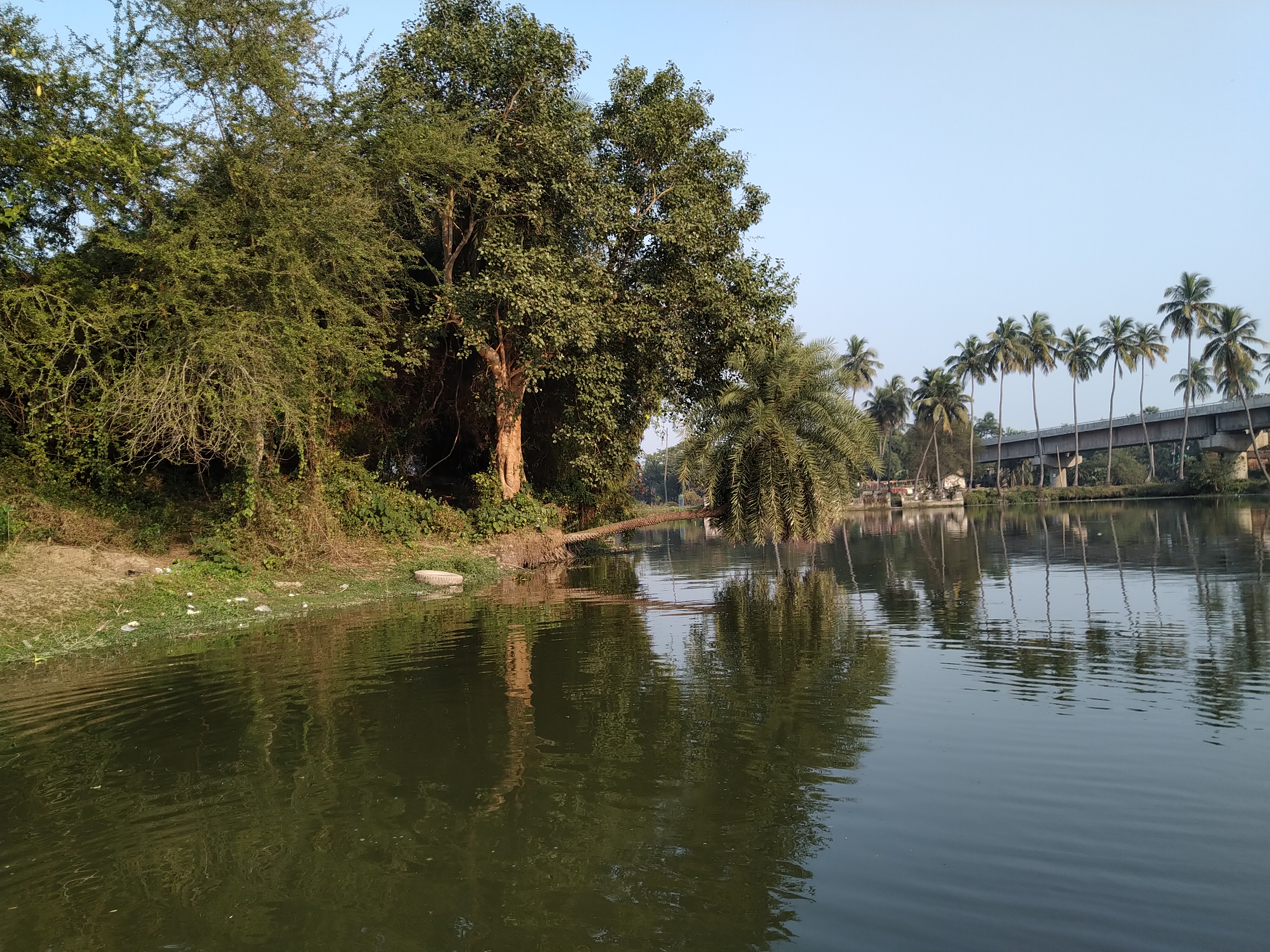
- Moyna Garh island

- Location in West Bengal, India
- Coordinates: 22.233333°N 87.783333°E
- Country: India
- State: West Bengal
- District: Purba Medinipur

Government
  - Type: Community development block

Area
  - Total: 154.51 km^{2} (59.66 sq mi)
- Elevation: 6 m (20 ft)

Population (2011)
  - Total: 226,927
  - Density: 1,468.7/km^{2} (3,803.9/sq mi)

Languages
  - Official: Bengali, English
- Time zone: UTC+5:30 (IST)
- Postal codes: 721629 (Moyna); 721642 (Arankiarana); 721644 (Paramanandapur)
- Area code: 03228
- ISO 3166 code: IN-WB
- Vehicle registration: WB-29, WB-30, WB-31, WB-32, WB-33
- Literacy: 86.33%
- Lok Sabha constituency: Tamluk
- Vidhan Sabha constituency: Moyna
- Website: purbamedinipur.gov.in

Moyna is a community development block that forms an administrative division in Tamluk subdivision of Purba Medinipur district in the Indian state of West Bengal.

== Geography ==
Purba Medinipur district is part of the upper Indo-Gangetic Plain and Eastern coastal plains. Topographically, the university can be divided into two parts – (a) almost entirely flat plains on the west, east and north, (b) the coastal plains on the south. The vast expanse of land is formed of alluvium and is composed of younger and coastal alluvial. The elevation of the district is within 10 metres above mean sea level. The district has a long coastline of 65.5 km along its southern and south eastern boundary. Five coastal CD Blocks, namely, Khejuri II, Contai II (Deshapran), Contai I, Ramnagar I and II, are occasionally affected by cyclones and tornadoes. Tidal floods are quite regular in these five CD Blocks. Normally floods occur in 21 of the 25 CD Blocks in the district. The major rivers are Haldi, Rupnarayan, Rasulpur, Bagui and Keleghai, flowing in north to south or North-west direction. River water is an important source of irrigation. The district has a low 899 hectare forest cover, which is 0.02% of its geographical area.

Moyna is located at 22°14′00″N 87°47′00″E.

Moyna CD Block is bounded by Panskura CD Block in the north, Tamluk and Nandakumar CD Blocks in the east, Bhagabanpur I CD Block in the south and Pingla and Sabang CD Blocks, in Paschim Medinipur district, in the west.

It is located 16 km from Tamluk, the district headquarters.

Moyna CD Block has an area of 154.51 km^{2}. It has 1 panchayat samity, 11 KG gram panchayats, 159 kilogram sansads (village councils), 85 mouzas and 85 inhabited villages. Moyna police station serves this block. Headquarters of this CD Block is at Dakshin Moyna.

Gram panchayats of Moyna block/ panchayat samiti are: Bakcha, Gojina, Gokulnagar, Moyna I, Moyna II, Naichanpur I, Naichanpur II, Paramanandapur, Ramchak, Srikantha and Tilkhoja.

== Demographics ==
=== Population ===
As per 2011 Census of India Moyna CD Block had a total population of 226,927, of which 220,630 were rural and 6,597 were urban. There were 117,989 (52%) males and 108,938 (48%) females. Population below 6 years was 26,488. Scheduled Castes numbered 56,820 (25.04%) and Scheduled Tribes numbered 316 (0.14%).

As per 2001 census, Moyna block had a total population of 196,503, out of which 101,890 were males and 94,613 were females. Moyna block registered a population growth of 12.73 per cent during the 1991-2001 decade. Growth by decade for the combined Midnapore district was 14.87 per cent. Decadal growth in West Bengal was 17.84 per cent.

Census Town in Moyna CD Block (2011 census figure in brackets): Goasafat (6,597).

Large villages (with 4,000+ population) in Moyna CD Block (2011 census figures in brackets): Saorabere Jalpai (6,890), Srikantha (6,549), Ramchandrapur (4,243), Gokul Nagar (4,029), Tilkhoja (5,766), Chongra (4,968), Paramanandapur (8,026), Sudampur (4,775), Purbba Dakshinmayna (7,491), Anandapur (4,343), Kalage Chhia (4,032), Kiyarana (5,808), Gojina (4,322), Arankiyarana (7,318), Bakcha (6,185) and Narikeldaha (8,309).

Other villages in Moyna CD Block (2011 census figures in brackets): Ram Chak (3,147) and Naichhanpur (2,677).

=== Literacy ===
As per the 2011 census the total number of literates in Moyna CD Block was 173,043 (86.33% of the population over 6 years) out of which 95,941 (55%) were males and 77,102 (45%) were females. As per the 2011 census, literacy in Purba Medinipur district was 87.02%. Purba Medinipur had the highest literacy amongst all the districts of West Bengal in 2011.

See also – List of West Bengal districts ranked by literacy rate

Literacy in CD blocks of
Purba Medinipur district
Tamluk subdivision
Tamluk – 87.06%
Sahid Matangini – 86.99%
Panskura I – 83.65%
Panskura II – 84.93%
Nandakumar – 85.56%
Chandipur – 87.81%
Moyna – 86.33%
Haldia subdivision
Mahishadal – 86.21%
Nandigram I – 84.89%
Nandigram II – 89.16%
Sutahata – 85.42%
Haldia – 85.96%
Contai subdivision
Contai I – 89.32%
Contai II – 88.33%
Contai III – 89.88%
Khejuri I – 88.90%
Khejuri II – 85.37%
Ramnagar I – 87.84%
Ramnagar II – 89.38%
Bhagabanpur II – 90.98%
Egra subdivision
Bhagabanpur I – 88.13%
Egra I – 82.83%
Egra II – 86.47%
Patashpur I – 86.58%
Patashpur II – 86.50%
2011 Census: CD Block Wise

Primary Census Abstract Data

=== Language and religion ===
Religion in Moyna CD block (2011)
Hinduism	90.65%
Islam	9.27%
Other or not stated	0.08%

In 2011 census Hindus numbered 205,710 and formed 90.65% of the population in Moyna CD Block. Muslims numbered 21,033 and formed 9.27% of the population. Others numbered 184 and formed 0.08% of the population. In 2001, Hindus made up 91.26% and Muslims 8.68% of the population respectively.

Languages of Moyna CD block (2011)
1. Bengali (98.7%)
2. Hindi (1.22%)
3. Others (0.04%)

According to the 2011 census, 98.74% of the population spoke Bengali and 1.22% Hindi as their first language.

== Rural poverty ==
The District Human Development Report for Purba Medinipur has provided a CD Block-wise data table for Modified Human Poverty Index of the district. Moyna CD Block registered 23.89 on the MHPI scale. The CD Block-wise mean MHPI was estimated at 24.9. Eleven out of twentyfive CD Blocks were found to be severely deprived in respect of grand CD Block average value of MHPI (CD Blocks with lower amount of poverty are better): All the CD Blocks of Haldia and Contai subdivisions appeared backward, except Ramnagar I & II, of all the blocks of Egra subdivision only Bhagabanpur I appeared backward and in Tamluk subdivision none appeared backward.

== Economy ==
=== Livelihood ===
In Moyna CD Block in 2011, total workers formed 38.26% of the total population and amongst the class of total workers, cultivators formed 20.12%, agricultural labourers 47.6%, household industry workers 3.16% and other workers 29.08%.

=== Infrastructure ===
There are 85 inhabited villages in Moyna CD block. All 85 villages (100%) have power supply. All 85 villages (100%) have drinking water supply. 30 villages (35.29%) have post offices. 84 villages (94.82%) have telephones (including landlines, public call offices and mobile phones). 19 villages (22.35%) have a pucca (paved) approach road and 37 villages (43.53%) have transport communication (includes bus service, rail facility and navigable waterways). 33 villages (38.82%) have agricultural credit societies. 7 villages (8.24%) have banks.

In 2007–08, around 40% of rural households in the district had electricity.

In 2013–14, there were 35 fertiliser depots, 8 seed stores and 36 fair price shops in the CD Block.

=== Agriculture ===
Persons engaged in agriculture
in Moyna CD Block
1. Bargadars (4.83%)
2. Patta holders (3.83%)
3. Small farmers (1.28%)
4. Marginal farmers (39.7%)
5. Agricultural labourers (50.3%)

According to the District Human Development Report of Purba Medinipur: The agricultural sector is the lifeline of a predominantly rural economy. It is largely dependent on the Low Capacity Deep Tubewells (around 50%) or High Capacity Deep Tubewells (around 27%) for irrigation, as the district does not have a good network of canals, compared to some of the neighbouring districts. In many cases the canals are drainage canals which get the backflow of river water at times of high tide or the rainy season. The average size of land holding in Purba Medinipur, in 2005–06, was 0.73 hectares against 1.01 hectares in West Bengal.

In 2013–14, the total area irrigated in Moyna CD Block was 11,993 hectares, out of which 1,235 hectares were irrigated by tank water, 3,650 hectares by deep tube wells, 1,303 hectares by shallow tube wells, 70 hectares by river lift irrigation and 5,730 hectares by other means.

Although the Bargadari Act of 1950 recognised the rights of bargadars to a higher share of crops from the land that they tilled, it was not implemented fully. Large tracts, beyond the prescribed limit of land ceiling, remained with the rich landlords. From 1977 onwards major land reforms took place in West Bengal. Land in excess of land ceiling was acquired and distributed amongst the peasants. Following land reforms land ownership pattern has undergone transformation. In 2013–14, persons engaged in agriculture in Moyna CD Block could be classified as follows: bargadars 4.83%, patta (document) holders 3.83%, small farmers (possessing land between 1 and 2 hectares) 1.28%, marginal farmers (possessing land up to 1 hectare) 39.73% and agricultural labourers 50.32%.

In 2013–14, Moyna CD Block produced 1,773 tonnes of Aman paddy, the main winter crop, from 2,148 hectares, 31,134 tonnes of Boro paddy, the spring crop, from 8,997 hectares, 2,518 tonnes of jute from 186 hectares and 8,731 tonnes of potatoes from 267 hectares. It also produced oil seeds.

Betelvine is a major source of livelihood in Purba Medinipur district, particularly in Tamluk and Contai subdivisions. Betelvine production in 2008-09 was the highest amongst all the districts and was around a third of the total state production. In 2008–09, Purba Mednipur produced 2,789 tonnes of cashew nuts from 3,340 hectares of land.

Concentration of Handicraft Activities in CD Blocks
- Horn Craft - Kolaghat
- Pata Chitra - Chandipur, Nandakumar
- Sea Shell – Ramnagar I & II
- Mat & Mat Diversified Products – Ramnagar I, Egra I & II, Patashpur I
- Brass & Bell Metal – Ramnagar I, Mahisadal, Patashpur II, Egra I
- Diversified Jute Products – Ramnagar II, Nandakumar, Kolaghat, Shahid Matangini
- Cane & Bamboo Products - Chandipur, Nandakumar, Kolaghat, Shahid Matangini
- Sola Craft - Tamluk, Kolaghat
- Pottery/Terracotta - Panskura, Tamluk, Sahid Matangini, Nandakumar
- Wood Craft - Tamluk
- Zari work - Sutahta, Mahisadal, Haldia, Nandakumar

Source: District Human Development Report, Purba Medinipur, Page 97

=== Pisciculture ===
Purba Medinipur's net district domestic product derives one fifth of its earnings from fisheries, the highest amongst all the districts of West Bengal. The nett area available for effective pisciculture in Moyna CD Block in 2013-14 was 1,425.45 hectares. 6,890 persons were engaged in the profession and approximate annual production was 54,310 quintals.

=== Banking ===
In 2013–14, Moyna CD Block had offices of 7 commercial banks and 1 gramin bank.

=== Backward Regions Grant Fund ===
Medinipur East district is listed as a backward region and receives financial support from the Backward Regions Grant Fund. The fund, created by the Government of India, is designed to redress regional imbalances in development. As of 2012, 272 districts across the country were listed under this scheme. The list includes 11 districts of West Bengal.

== Transport ==
Moyna CD Block has 16 ferry services and 16 originating/ terminating bus routes. The nearest railway station is 20 km from the block headquarters.

== Education ==
In 2013–14, Moyna CD Block had 153 primary schools with 9,411 students, 9 middle schools with 223 students, 10 high schools with 5,581 students and 20 higher secondary schools with 25,503 students. Moyna CD Block had 1 general college with 1,872 students, 2 professional/ technical institutions with 189 students, 350 institutions for special and non-formal education with 14,279 students.

As per the 2011 census, in Moyna CD block, amongst the 85 inhabited villages, 1 village did not have a school, 56 villages had two or more primary schools, 46 villages had at least 1 primary and 1 middle school and 29 villages had at least 1 middle and 1 secondary school.

Moyna College was established 1972 at Moyna. It is affiliated with Vidyasagar University.

== Healthcare ==
In 2014, Moyna CD Block had 1 block primary health centre, 2 primary health centres, and 2 private nursing homes with total 50 beds and 3 doctors (excluding private bodies). It had 35 family welfare sub centres. 5,913 patients were treated indoor and 124,750 patients were treated outdoor in the hospitals, health centres and subcentres of the CD Block.

Gar Moyna Block Primary Health Centre, PO Moyna (with 15 beds) is the main medical facility in Moyna CD block. There are primary health centres at Ramchandrapur (with 2 beds) and Arangkianara (with 10 beds).
