= Moyna Assembly constituency =

Moyna
- Constituency No. 206 for the West Bengal Legislative Assembly
- Interactive Map Outlining Moyna Assembly Constituency

Constituency details
- Country: India
- Region: East India
- State: West Bengal
- District: Purba Medinipur
- Lok Sabha constituency: Tamluk
- Established: 1951
- Total electors: 196,912
- Reservation: None

Member of Legislative Assembly
- 18th West Bengal Legislative Assembly
- Incumbent Ashok Dinda (Cricketer)
- Party: BJP
- Alliance: NDA
- Elected year: 2026

Moyna Assembly constituency is an assembly constituency in Purba Medinipur district in the Indian state of West Bengal.

Most Successful parties from Moyna assembly
1. Communist Party of India (Marxist) (6 times) (33.3%)
2. Communist Party of India (5 times) (27.8%)
3. Indian National Congress (3 times) (16.7%)
4. All India Trinamool Congress (2 time) (11.1%)
5. Bharatiya Janata Party (2 times) (11.1%)

== Overview ==
As per orders of the Delimitation Commission, No. 206 Moyna Assembly constituency is composed of the following: Moyna community development block, Anantapur I, Anantapur II, Nilkunthia, Sreerampur I and Sreerampur II gram panchayats of Tamluk community development block.

Moyna Assembly constituency is part of No. 30 Tamluk (Lok Sabha constituency).

== Members of the Legislative Assembly ==
Year	Name	Party
1952	Kanai Lal Bhowmick	Communist Party of India
1957	Ananga Mohan Das	Indian National Congress
1962	Ananga Mohan Das	Indian National Congress
1967	Kanai Lal Bhowmick	Communist Party of India
1969	Kanai Lal Bhowmick	Communist Party of India
1971	Kanai Lal Bhowmick	Communist Party of India
1972	Kanai Lal Bhowmick	Communist Party of India
1977	Pulak Bera	Communist Party of India (Marxist)
1982	Pulak Bera	Communist Party of India (Marxist)
1987	Pulin Bera	Communist Party of India (Marxist)
1991	Manik Bhowmik	Indian National Congress
1996	Dipak Bera	Communist Party of India (Marxist)
2001	Dipak Bera	Communist Party of India (Marxist)
2006	Sk. Mujibur Rahman	Communist Party of India (Marxist)
2011	Bhusan Chandra Dolai	Trinamool Congress
2016	Sangram Kumar Dolai	Trinamool Congress
2021	Ashok Dinda	Bharatiya Janata Party
2026	Ashok Dinda	Bharatiya Janata Party

== Election results ==
=== 2026 ===
2026 West Bengal Legislative Assembly election: Moyna
Party	Candidate	Votes	%	±%
BJP	Ashoke Dinda	127,166	51.62	▲3.45
AITC	Chandan Mondal	110,925	45.03	▼2.58
CPI	Swapan Barman	4,499	1.83	
NOTA	None of the above	1,061	0.43	▼0.16
Majority		16,241	6.59	▲6.03
Turnout		246,333	92.79	▲4.83
BJP hold		Swing		

=== 2021 ===
2021 West Bengal Legislative Assembly election: Moyna
Party	Candidate	Votes	%	±%
BJP	Ashok Dinda	108,109	48.17	
AITC	Sangram Kumar Dolai	106,849	47.61	
INC	Manik Bhaumik	5,108	2.28	
NOTA	None of the above	1,335	0.59	
Majority		1,260	0.56	
Turnout		224,434	87.96	
BJP gain from AITC		Swing		

=== 2016 ===
2016 West Bengal Legislative Assembly election: Moyna
Party	Candidate	Votes	%	±%
AITC	Sangram Kumar Dolui	100,980	50.25	−0.70
INC	Manik Bhaumik	88,856	44.21	
BJP	Das Sukesh Ranjan	6,506	3.24	+0.65
Majority		12,124	6.03	
Turnout		200,955	88.04	
AITC hold		Swing		

=== 2011 ===
West Bengal assembly elections, 2011: Moyna
Party	Candidate	Votes	%	±%
AITC	Bhusan Chandra Dolai	91,037	50.95	+2.50
CPI(M)	Sk. Mujibur Rahman	81,081	45.38	−3.57
BJP	Asit Pattanayak	4,626	2.59	
Independent	Sheikh Nurul Islam	1,940		
Turnout		178,685	90.74	
AITC gain from CPI(M)		Swing	6.07	

.# Swing calculated on Congress+Trinamool Congress vote percentages taken together in 2006.

=== 2006 ===
In the state assembly elections in 2006, Sk. Mujibur Rahman of CPI(M) won the 206 Moyna assembly seat defeating his nearest rival Prafulla Kumar Barai of Trinamool Congress. Contests in most years were multi cornered but only winners and runners are being mentioned. Dipak Bera of CPI(M) defeated Bhusan Chandra Dolai of Trinamool Congress in 2001, and Manik Bhowmik of Congress in 1996. Manik Bhowmik of Congress defeated Dipak Bera of CPI(M) in 1991. Pulin Bera of CPI(M) defeated Rekharani Deb of Congress in 1987. Pulak Bera of CPI(M) defeated Bhusan Chandra Doloi of Congress in 1982 and 1977.

=== 1972 ===
Kanai Lal Bhowmick of CPI won in 1972, 1971, 1969 and 1967. Ananga Mohan Das of Congress won in 1962 and 1957. In independent India's first election in 1951, Kanai Lal Bhowmick of CPI won the Moyna seat.
