= Khejuri Assembly constituency =

Khejuri
- Constituency No. 215 for the West Bengal Legislative Assembly
- Interactive Map Outlining Khejuri Assembly Constituency

Constituency details
- Country: India
- Region: East India
- State: West Bengal
- District: Purba Medinipur
- Lok Sabha constituency: Kanthi
- Established: 1951
- Total electors: 2,38,630
- Reservation: SC

Member of Legislative Assembly
- 18th West Bengal Legislative Assembly
- Incumbent Subrata Paik
- Party: BJP
- Alliance: NDA
- Elected year: 2026

Khejuri Assembly constituency is an assembly constituency in Purba Medinipur district in the Indian state of West Bengal. It is reserved for scheduled castes.

== Overview ==
As per orders of the Delimitation Commission, No. 215 Khejuri Assembly constituency (SC) is composed of the following: Khejuri I and Khejuri II community development blocks, and Garbari I and Garbari II gram panchayats of Bhagabanpur II community development block.

Khejuri Assembly constituency (SC) is part of No. 31 Kanthi (Lok Sabha constituency).

== Members of the Legislative Assembly ==
Election	M.L.A.	Party
1952	Koustav Kranti Kiran	INC
1952	Abha Maiti	INC
1962	Abanti Kumar Das	INC
1967	Bimal Paik	INC
1969	Paresh Das	Bangla Congress
1971	Jagdish Chandra Das	CPI
1972	Bimal Paik	INC
1977	Sunirmal Paik	JP
1982	Sunirmal Paik	Independent
1987	Sunirmal Paik	Independent
1991	Sunirmal Paik	CPI
1996	Ram Chandra Mandal	CPI
2001	Sunirmal Paik	WBSP
2006	Swadesh Patra	WBSP
2011	Ranajit Mondal	Trinamool Congress
2016	Ranajit Mondal	Trinamool Congress
2021	Santanu Pramanik	Bharatiya Janata Party
2026	Subrata Paik	Bharatiya Janata Party

== Election results ==
=== 2026 ===
2026 West Bengal Legislative Assembly election: Khejuri
Party	Candidate	Votes	%	±%
BJP	Subrata Paik	129,875	54.96	+3.03
AITC	Rabin Chandra Mandal	97,185	41.12	−2.36
CPI(M)	Himangshu Das	5,365	2.27	−1.4
NOTA	None of the above	601	0.25	−0.28
Majority		32,690	13.84	+5.39
Turnout		236,328	95.15	+6.05
BJP hold		Swing		

=== 2021 ===
2021 West Bengal Legislative Assembly election: Khejuri
Party	Candidate	Votes	%	±%
BJP	Santanu Pramanik	110,407	51.93	
AITC	Partha Pratim Das	92,442	43.48	
CPI(M)	Himangshu Das	7,812	3.67	
NOTA	None of the above	1,136	0.53	
Majority		17,965	8.45	
Turnout		212,621	89.1	
BJP gain from AITC		Swing		

=== 2016 ===
2016 West Bengal Legislative Assembly election: Khejuri
Party	Candidate	Votes	%	±%
AITC	Ranajit Mondal	103,699	54.3	▲1.19
Independent	Ashim Kumar Mondal	61,214	32.05	New
BJP	Patra Swadesh Ranjan	17,064	8.94	▲6.57
SP	Raghunath Das	3,473	1.82	▼41.52
SUCI(C)	Tapas Maity	2,891	1.51	New
NOTA	None of the Above	2,625	1.37	New
Majority		42,485	22.25	▲12.48
Turnout		1,90,966	89.39	▼3.78
AITC hold		Swing		

=== 2011 ===
2011 West Bengal state assembly election: Khejuri
Party	Candidate	Votes	%	±%
AITC	Ranajit Mondal	87,833	53.11	▲13.73
SP	Ashim Kumar Mondal	71,673	43.34	▼14.48
BJP	Kalipada Mandal	3,924	2.37	
Independent	Sachchidananda Das	1,939	1.17	
Majority		16,160	22.25	▲12.48
Turnout		1,65,369	9.77	
AITC gain from SP		Swing	28.21	

=== 2006 ===
In the 2006 state assembly elections, Swadesh Patra of WBSP won the Khejuri assembly seat (SC) defeating his nearest rival Dr. Partha Pratim Das of Trinamool Congress. Contests in most years were multi-cornered, but only winners and runners are mentioned here. Sunirmal Paik of WBSP defeated Ram Chandra Mandal of Trinamool Congress in 2001. Ram Chandra Mandal representing CPI(M) defeated Sunirmal Paik representing Congress in 1996. Sunirmal Paik representing CPI(M) defeated Santiram Das of Congress in 1991. Sunirmal Paik, Independent, defeated Susanta Mandal of Congress in 1987 and 1982. Sunirmal Paik of Janata Party defeated Sunil Sit of CPI(M) in 1977.

=== 1972 ===
Bimal Paik of Congress won in 1972. Jagadish Chandra Das of CPI(M) won in 1971. Paresh Das of Bangla Congress won in 1969. B.Paik of Congress won in 1967. Abanti Kumar Das of Congress won in 1962. The Khejuri seat was not there in 1957. Khejuri had a dual seat in independent India's first election in 1951. It was won by Koustav Kanti Karan and Abha Maiti, both of Congress.
