= Purba Medinipur district =

District in West Bengal, India

Purba Medinipur district East Medinipur district
- District of West Bengal
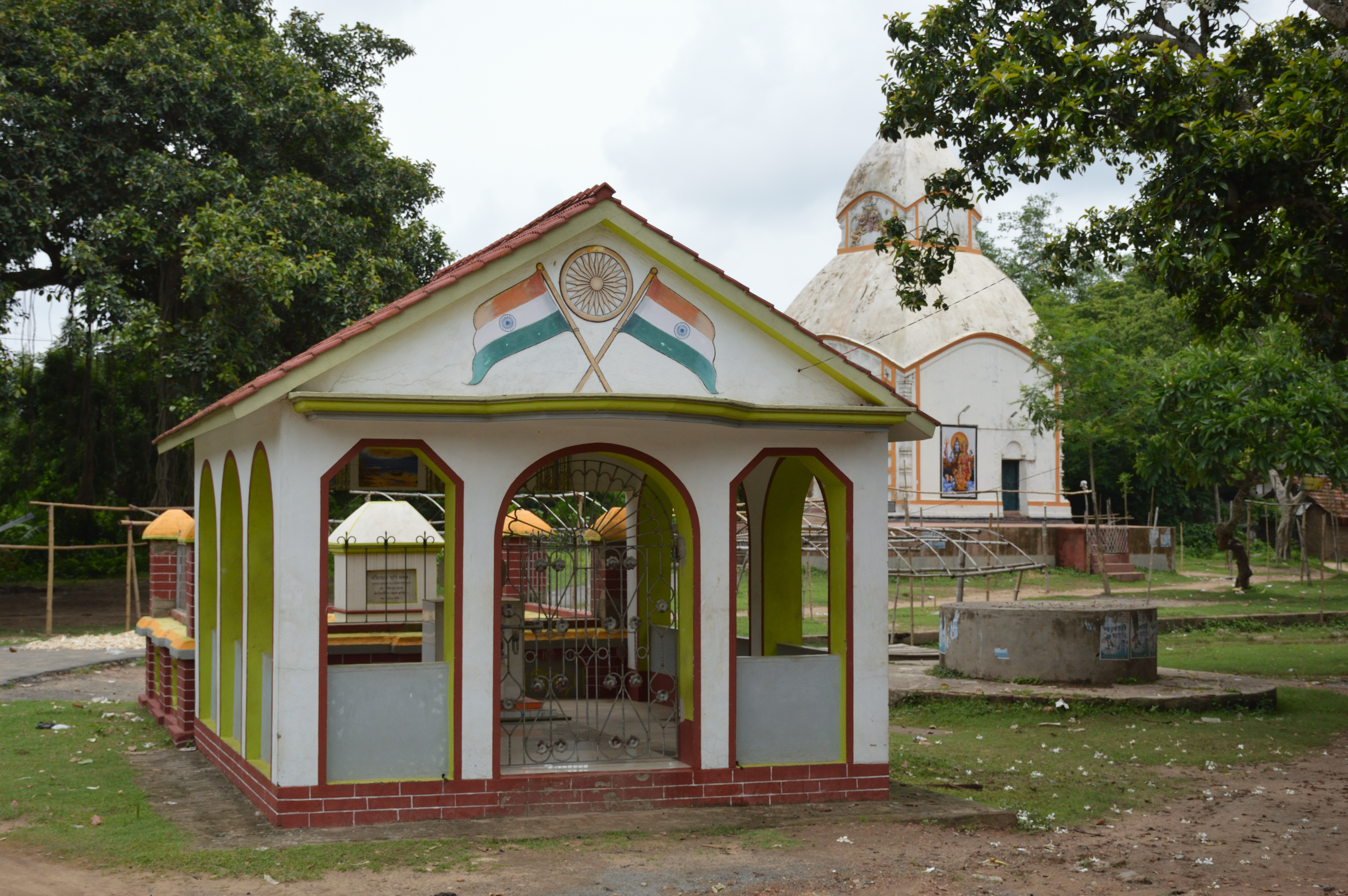
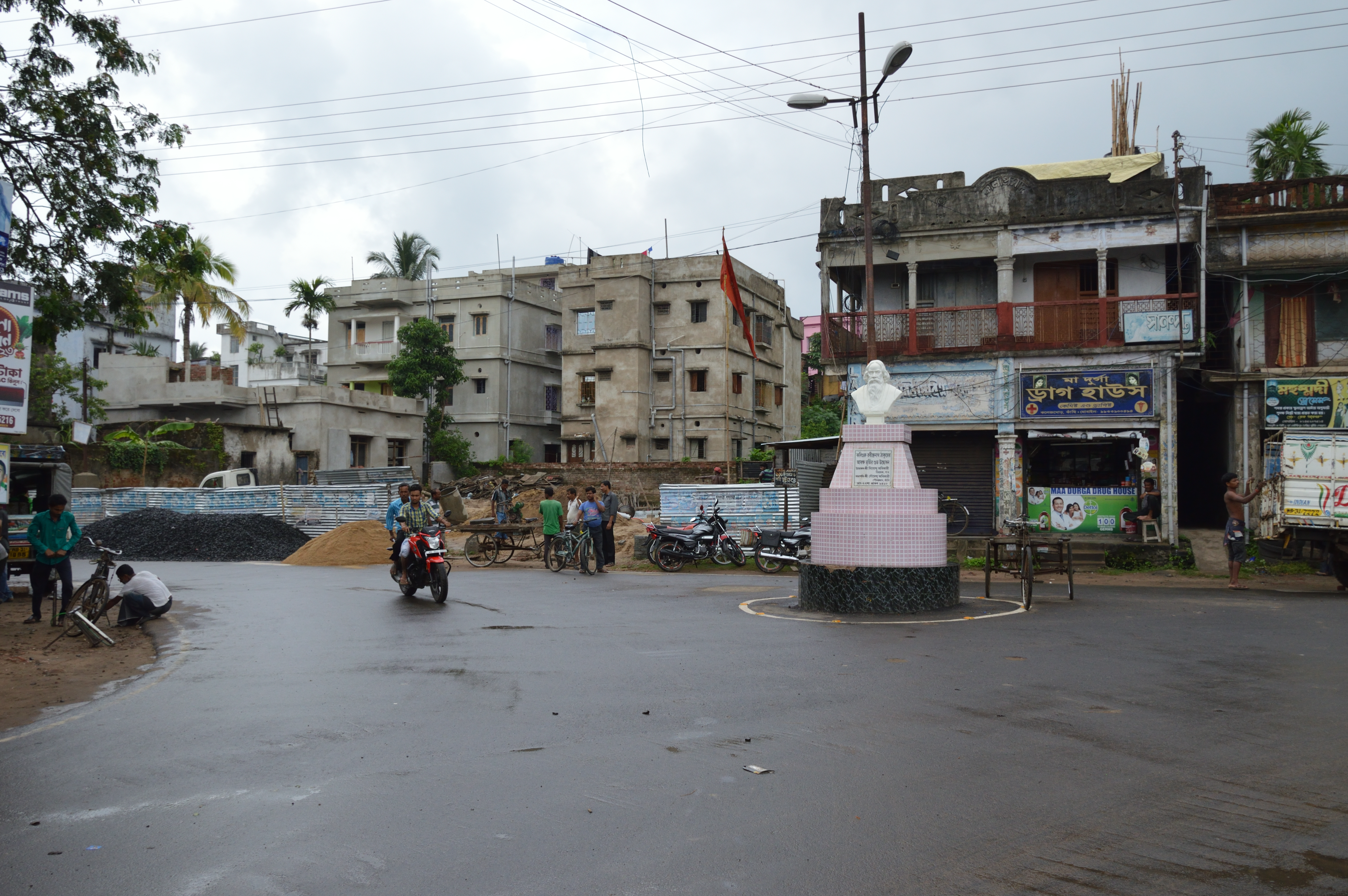
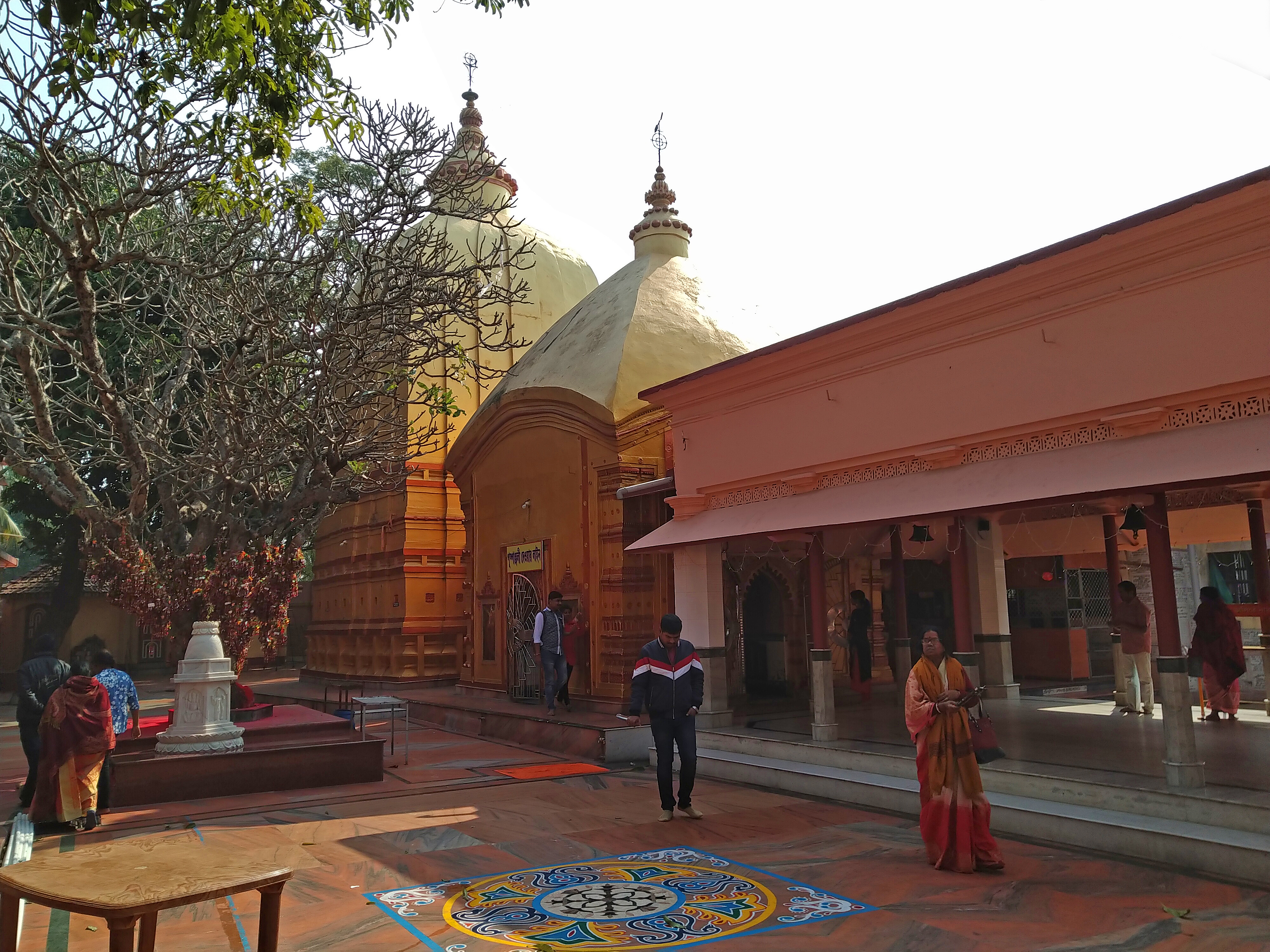
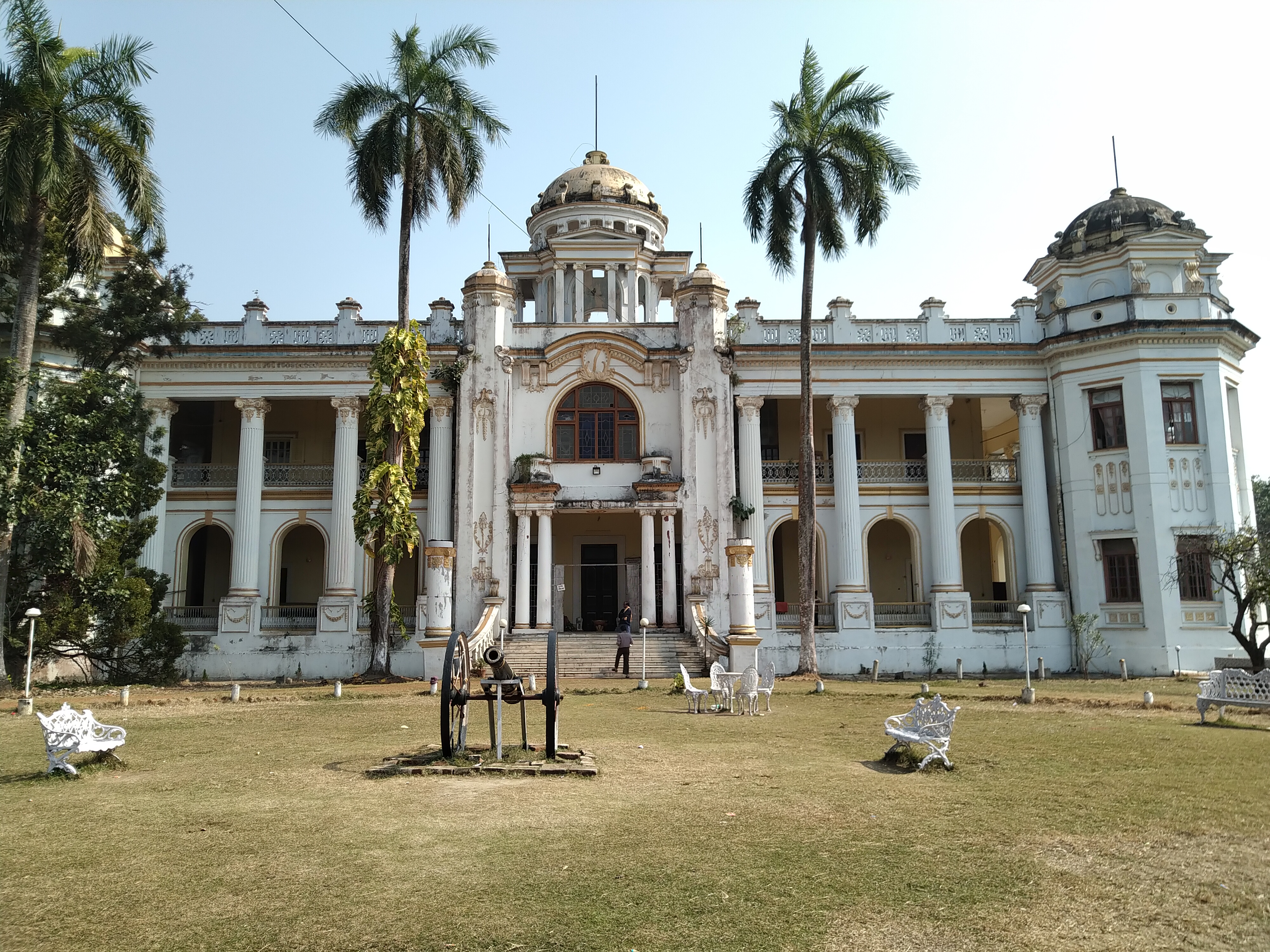
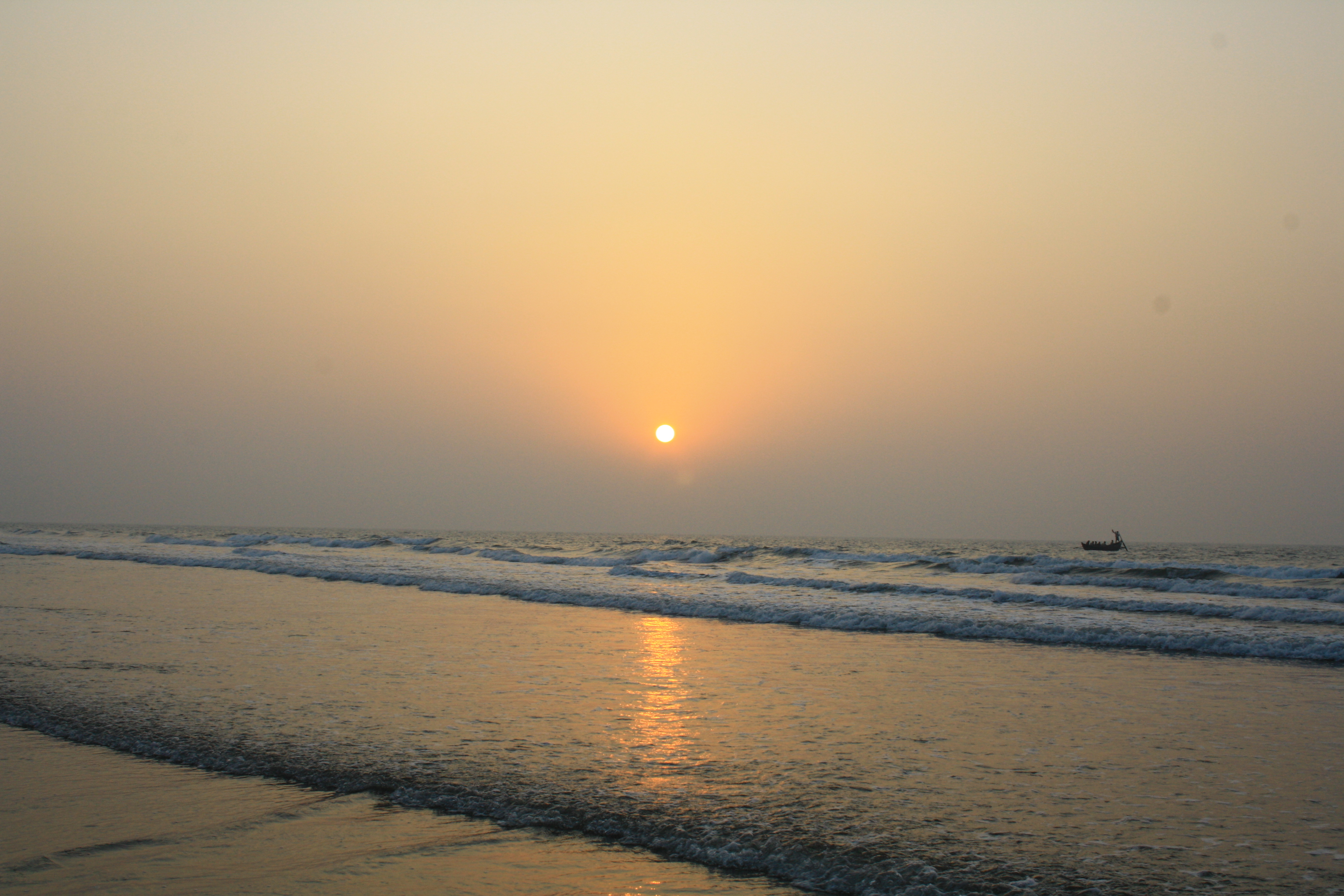
- Clockwise from top-left: Memorial to Bankim Chandra Chattopadhyay at Dariapur, College Junction at Kanthi, Mahishadal Rajbari, New Digha Beach at Digha, Bargabhima temple in Tamluk

- Location of East Midnapore district in West Bengal
- Coordinates: 22.3°N 87.92°E
- Country: India
- State: West Bengal
- Division: Medinipur
- Headquarters: Tamluk

Government
  - Collector & District Magistrate: Unice Rishin Ismail, IAS
  - Superintendent of Police: Parijat Biswas, IPS

Area
  - Total: 4,785 km^{2} (1,847 sq mi)

Population (2011)
  - Total: 5,095,875
  - Density: 1,065/km^{2} (2,758/sq mi)

Demographics
  - Literacy: 87.66 per cent
  - Sex ratio: 936 ♂/♀

Languages
  - Official: Bengali
  - Additional official: English
- Time zone: UTC+05:30 (IST)
- Website: purbamedinipur.gov.in

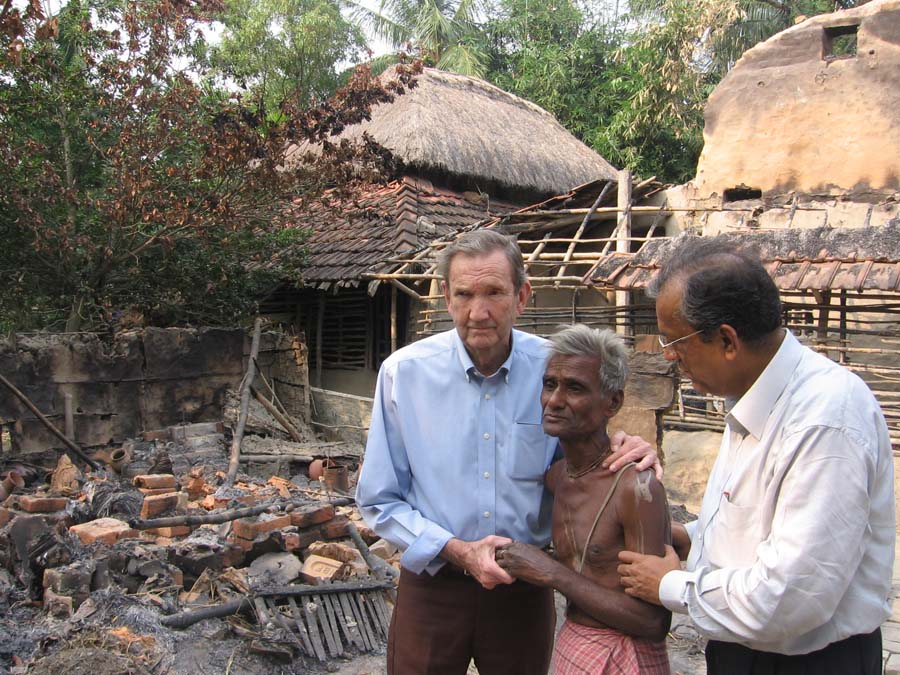
Ramsey Clark visiting Nandigram

Purba Medinipur (English: East Medinipur, alternative spelling Midnapore) district is an administrative unit in the Indian state of West Bengal. It is the southernmost district of Medinipur division – one of the five administrative divisions of West Bengal. The headquarters is Tamluk. It was formed on 1 January 2002 after the Partition of Medinipur into East Midnapore and West Midnapore which lies at the northern and western border of it. The state of Odisha is at the southwest border; the Bay of Bengal lies in the south; the Hooghly River and South 24 Parganas district to the east; Howrah district to the north-east; West Midnapore district to the west.

East Midnapore comprises the sub-divisions of Tamluk, Contai and Haldia of erstwhile Medinipur district. Another sub-division, Egra has been created out of the erstwhile Contai sub-division during the partition of Midnapore. In 2011, the state government proposed to rename the district as Tamralipta district after the ancient port city of Tamralipta which used to lie near the modern district headquarters.

East Midnapore saw many political movements during the British Raj. A parallel government named the Tamralipta Jatiya Sarkar was formed during the Quit India Movement in Tamluk. In 2007, East Midnapore witnessed the Nandigram violence, an incident of police firing that killed 14 farmers.

== History ==
=== Tamralipta ===
Tamralipta, the port in ancient India, is believed by scholars to have been around modern-day Tamluk. It is mentioned in the writings of Ptolemy (150 AD), the Greco-Egyptian writer, as well as Faxian and Xuanzang, Chinese monks and travellers. It was the main port used by Ashoka, the Mauryan emperor. With too much siltation the port lost its importance around eighth century A.D. The supreme leader of Tamralipta Jatiya sarkar was Satish chandra Samanta.

== Geography ==
=== Overview ===
East Midnapore district is part of the lower Indo-Gangetic Plain and Eastern coastal plains. Topographically, the district can be divided into two parts – (a) almost entirely flat plains on the west, east and north, (b) the coastal plains on the south. The vast expanse of land is formed of alluvium and is composed of younger and coastal alluvial. The elevation of the district is within 10 meters above the mean sea level. The district has a long coastline of 65.5 km along its southern and south eastern boundary. Five coastal CD Blocks, namely, Khejuri II, Contai II (Deshapran), Contai I, Ramnagar I and II, are occasionally affected by cyclones and tornadoes. Tidal floods are quite regular in these five CD Blocks. Normally floods occur in 21 of the 25 CD Blocks in the district. The major rivers are Haldi, Rupnarayan, Rasulpur, Bagui and Keleghai, flowing in north to south or south-east direction. River water is an important source of irrigation. The district has a low 899 hectare forest cover, which is 0.02% of its geographical area.

=== Major cities and towns ===
Major cities and towns include Panskura, Tamluk, Nandakumar, Contai, Egra, Haldia, Mecheda, Mahishadal, Digha, Mandarmani, Khejuri, Ramnagar, Patashpur, Kolaghat, Nandigram, Chandipur.

== Divisions ==
=== Administrative subdivisions ===
Subdivision	Headquarters	Area km^{2}	Population (2011)	Rural Population % (2001)	Urban Population % (2001)
Tamluk Sadar	Tamluk	1084.30	1,791,695	94.08	5.92
Haldia	Haldia	683.94	959,934	79.19	20.81
Egra	Egra	940.96	958,939	96.96	3.04
Contai	Contai	1251.21	1,385,307	93.55	6.45

Tamluk Sadar subdivision consists of Tamluk municipality, Panskura municipality and seven community development blocks: Nandakumar, Moyna, Tamluk, Shahid Matangini, Panskura–I, Panskura–II and Chandipur (Nadigram–III). Haldia subdivision consists of Haldia municipality and five community development blocks: Mahishadal, Nandigram–I, Nandigram–II, Sutahata and Haldia. Egra subdivision consists of Egra municipality and five community development blocks: Bhagawanpur–I, Egra–I, Egra–II, Pataspur–I and Pataspur–II. Contai subdivision consists of Contai municipality and eight community development blocks: Contai–I, Contai–II, Contai–III, Khejuri–I, Khejuri–II, Ramnagar–I and Ramnagar–II, Bhagawanpur–II.

Tamluk is the district headquarters. There are 21 police stations, 25 development blocks, 5 municipalities and 223 gram panchayats in this district.

Other than in the municipality area, each subdivision contains community development blocks which in turn are divided into rural areas and census towns. In total there are 10 urban units: five municipalities and five census towns. Panskura municipality was established in 2001.

==== Tamluk Sadar subdivision ====
- Two municipalities: Tamluk and Panskura
- Nandakumar community development block consists of rural areas only with 12 gram panchayats.
- Moyna community development block consists of rural areas with 11 gram panchayats and one census town: Garsafat.
- Tamluk community development block consists of rural areas with 12 gram panchayats and two census towns: Anantapur and South Baguan.
- Sahid Matangini community development block consists of rural areas with 10 gram panchayats and two census towns: Kakdihi and Shantipur.
- Panskura community development block consists of rural areas only with 14 gram panchayats.
- Kolaghat community development block consists of rural areas with 13 gram panchayats and four census towns: Kolaghat, Amalhara, Mihitikri and Kharisha.
- Chandipur community development block consists of rural areas with 10 gram panchayats and two census towns: Kotbar and Ershal.

==== Haldia subdivision ====
- One municipality: Haldia.
- Mahishadal community development block consists of rural areas with 11 gram panchayats and one census town: Garh Kamalpur.
- Nandigram I community development block consists of rural areas with 10 gram panchayats and one census town: Nandigram.
- Nandigram II community development block consists of rural areas with 7 gram panchayats and one census town: Ashadtalya.
- Sutahata community development block consists of rural areas with 6 gram panchayats and one census town: Barda
- Haldia community development block consists of rural areas only with 4 gram panchayats.

==== Egra subdivision ====
- One municipality: Egra.
- Bhagabanpur I community development block consists of rural areas with 10 gram panchayats and two census towns: Benudiya and Hincha Gerya.
- Egra I community development block consists of rural areas only with 8 gram panchayats.
- Egra II community development block consists of rural areas only with 8 gram panchayats.
- Patashpur I community development block consists of rural areas only with 9 gram panchayats.
- Patashpur II community development block consists of rural areas only with 7 gram panchayats.

==== Contai subdivision ====
- One municipality: Contai.
- Contai I community development block consists of rural areas only with 8 gram panchayats.
- Deshapran community development block consists of rural areas with 8 gram panchayats and one census town: Basantia.
- Contai III community development block consists of rural areas only with 8 gram panchayats.
- Khejuri I community development block consists of rural areas only with 6 gram panchayats.
- Khejuri II community development block consists of rural areas only with 5 gram panchayats.
- Ramnagar I community development block consists of rural areas with 9 gram panchayats and one census town: Khadalgobra.
- Ramnagar II community development block consists of rural areas only with 8 gram panchayats.
- Bhagabanpur II community development block consists of rural areas only with 9 gram panchayats.

=== Assembly Constituencies ===
No.	Name	Lok Sabha	MLA	2026 Winner	2024 Lead
203	Tamluk	Tamluk	Hare Krishna Bera	Bharatiya Janata Party	Bharatiya Janata Party
204	Panskura Purba	Tamluk	Subrata Maity	Bharatiya Janata Party	Bharatiya Janata Party
205	Panskura Paschim	Ghatal	Sintu Senapati	Bharatiya Janata Party	Bharatiya Janata Party
206	Moyna	Tamluk	Ashok Dinda	Bharatiya Janata Party	Bharatiya Janata Party
207	Nandakumar	Tamluk	Nirmal Khanra	Bharatiya Janata Party	Bharatiya Janata Party
208	Mahisadal	Tamluk	Subhas Chandra Panja	Bharatiya Janata Party	Bharatiya Janata Party
209	Haldia (SC)	Tamluk	Pradip Kumar Bijali	Bharatiya Janata Party	Bharatiya Janata Party
210	Nandigram	Tamluk	Suvendu Adhikari	Bharatiya Janata Party	Bharatiya Janata Party
211	Chandipur	Kanthi	Pijush Kanti Das	Bharatiya Janata Party	Bharatiya Janata Party
212	Patashpur	Kanthi	Tapan Maity	Bharatiya Janata Party	Trinamool Congress
213	Kanthi Uttar	Kanthi	Sumita Sinha	Bharatiya Janata Party	Bharatiya Janata Party
214	Bhagabanpur	Kanthi	Shantanu Pramanik	Bharatiya Janata Party	Bharatiya Janata Party
215	Khejuri (SC)	Kanthi	Subrata Paik	Bharatiya Janata Party	Bharatiya Janata Party
216	Kanthi Dakshin	Kanthi	Arup Kumar Das	Bharatiya Janata Party	Bharatiya Janata Party
217	Ramnagar	Kanthi	Chandra Sekhar Mondal	Bharatiya Janata Party	Bharatiya Janata Party
218	Egra	Medinipur	Dibyendu Adhikari	Bharatiya Janata Party	Bharatiya Janata Party

Purba Medinipur contains 16 assembly constituencies, equally divided between two Lok Sabha constituencies Tamluk and Kanthi. The MP for Tamluk is Abhijit Gangopadhyay (BJP) while the MP for Kanthi is Soumendu Adhikari (BJP). These are members of the Adhikari family which has dominated politics in the district whose prominent member has been Suvendu Adhikari, now Leader of Opposition in the West Bengal Legislative Assembly.

== Demographics ==
According to the 2011 census East Midnapore district has a population of 5,095,875, roughly equal to the United Arab Emirates or the US state of Colorado. This gives it a ranking of 20th in India (out of a total of 640). The district has a population density of 1,076 inhabitants per square kilometre (2,790/sq mi). Its population growth rate over the decade 2001-2011 was 15.32%. East Midnapore has a sex ratio of 936 females for every 1000 males, and a literacy rate of 88.60%. 11.63% of the population lives in urban areas. Scheduled Castes and Scheduled Tribes make up 14.63% and 0.55% of the population respectively.

Bengali is the predominant language, spoken by 98.31% of the population.

=== Religion ===
Religion in East Midnapore district (2011)
Hinduism	85.24%
Islam	14.59%
Other or not stated	0.17%

Religion in present-day East Midnapore district (Note: This is the Contai and Tamluk subdivisions of the former Medinipur district)
Religion	Population (1941)	Percentage (1941)	Population (2011)	Percentage (2011)
Hinduism	1,365,664	90.19%	4,343,972	85.24%
Islam	139,408	9.21%	743,436	14.59%
Others (Note: Including Jainism, Christianity, Buddhism, Zoroastrianism, Judaism, Ad-Dharmis, or not stated)	9,165	0.61%	8,467	0.17%
Total Population	1,514,237	100%	5,095,875	100%

Hindus are the majority religion in the district. Muslims are the second largest religion.

== Economy ==
In 2006 the Ministry of Panchayati Raj named East Midnapore one of the country's 250 most backward districts (out of a total of 640). It is one of the 11 districts in West Bengal receiving funds from the Backward Regions Grant Fund Programme (BRGF). in East Midnapore Mat "Madur" industry are very popular, it's occupation of most people. In the agriculture sector paddy, wheat, chilli, vegetable are also popular in India.

Concentration of Handicraft Activities in Purba Medinipur
- Horn Craft - Kolaghat
- Pata Chitra - Chandipur, Nandakumar,
- Sea Shell – Ramnagar I & II, Patashpur I
- Mat & Mat Diversified Products – Ramnagar I, Egra I & II, Patashpur I
- Brass & Bell Metal – Ramnagar I, Mahisadal, Patashpur II, Egra I
- Diversified Jute Products – Ramnagar II, Nandakumar, Kolaghat, Shahid Matangini
- Cane & Bamboo Products - Chandipur, Nandakumar, Kolaghat, Shahid Matangini
- Sola Craft - Tamluk, Kolaghat
- Pottery/Terracotta - Panskura, Tamluk, Sahid Matangini, Nandakumar
- Wood Craft - Tamluk
- Zari work- Sutahta, Mahishadal, Haldia, Nandakumar

== Literacy and education ==
Educational facilities in East Midnapore district:
High School (including higher secondary school)–456
Junior High School–189
Junior High Madarsa–5
High Madarsa–8
Senior Madarsa–2
Primary School–3217
Sishu Sikhsha Kendra–1516
Ishwar chandra Jana Chetna Centre–3089
College–15
Engineering colleges–2
Skill development institutions–44

According to the 2011 census, the district has a literacy rate of 87.66 up from 80.20% of 2001 census. As per 2001 census, this district had a male literacy rate of 89.1% and female literacy rate was 70.7%. The education index of this district is 0.74 and it is ranked first in literacy in comparison to other districts of West Bengal.

Given in the table below (data in numbers) is a comprehensive picture of the education scenario in East Midnapore district for the year 2013–2014. It may be noted that primary schools include junior basic schools; middle schools, high schools, and higher secondary schools include madrasahs; technical schools include junior technical schools, junior government polytechnics, industrial technical institutes, industrial training centres, nursing training institutes, etc.; technical and professional colleges include engineering colleges, polytechnics, medical colleges, Allied & Healthcare institutes, management colleges, teachers training, and nursing training colleges, law colleges, art colleges, music colleges etc. Special and non-formal education centres include sishu siksha kendras, madhyamik siksha centre, centres of Rabindra mukta vidyalaya, recognised Sanskrit tols, institutions for the blind and other handicapped persons, Anganwadi centres, reformatory schools etc.

Subdivision	Primary School		Middle School		High School		Higher Secondary School		General College, Univ		Technical / Professional Instt		Non-formal Education	
Subdivision	Institution	Student	Institution	Student	Institution	Student	Institution	Student	Institution	Student	Institution	Student	Institution	Student
Tamluk	1,084	84,258	78	5,789	77	43,408	144	171,516	6	12,728	17	2,747	2,704	112,411
Haldia	557	43,173	40	5,082	54	36,767	77	83,659	5	9,792	16	6,256	1,359	59,879
Egra	629	41,418	76	11,537	49	32,167	74	90,730	3	9,498	2	154	1,595	62,200
Contai	983	50,945	99	10,557	81	46,690	102	120,128	5	12,223	10	1,602	2,316	90,552
Purba Medinipur district	3,253	219,794	293	32,965	261	159,032	397	466,093	19	44,241	45	10,759	7,974	375,042

== Healthcare ==
The table below (all data in numbers) presents an overview of the medical facilities available and patients treated in the hospitals, health centres and sub-centres in 2014 in East Midnapore district.

Subdivision	Health & Family Welfare Deptt, WB				Other State Govt Deptts	Local bodies	Central Govt Deptts / PSUs	NGO / Private Nursing Homes	Total	Total Number of Beds	Total Number of Doctors	Indoor Patients	Outdoor Patients
Subdivision	Hospitals	Rural Hospitals	Block Primary Health Centres	Primary Health Centres	Other State Govt Deptts	Local bodies	Central Govt Deptts / PSUs	NGO / Private Nursing Homes	Total	Total Number of Beds	Total Number of Doctors	Indoor Patients	Outdoor Patients
Tamluk	1	-	7	14	-	-	-	70	92	1,506	96	61,84	1,251,099
Haldia	1	2	3	10	-	-	-	19	35	803	67	27,586	757,876
Egra	1	1	4	11	-	-	-	21	38	489	42	23,699	419,829
Contai	2	-	8	16	-	-	-	22	48	688	88	59,882	890,607
Purba Medinipur district	5	3	22	51	-	-	-	132	213	3,486	293	172,251	3,319,411

== Notable people ==
- Birendranath Sasmal, independence activist, barrister, freedom fighter and politician
- Satish Chandra Samanta, freedom fighter, politician and principal leader of Tamralipta Jatiya Sarkar
- Sushil Kumar Dhara, freedom fighter, politician & another leader of Tamralipta Jatiya Sarkar
- Ajoy Mukherjee, freedom fighter, politician & former Chief Minister of West Bengal
- Matangini Hazra, freedom fighter, martyr in Quit India Movement
- Madhusudan Jana, doctor, journalist, teacher and social worker. Founder of Nihar Press
- Basanta Kumar Das, freedom fighter, politician, member of the Constituent Assembly which helped to create the Constitution of India
- Nikunja Behari Maiti, Independence activist, politician, first Education Minister of West Bengal
- Anil Ghorai, poet, novelist and short story writer
- Mani Lal Bhaumik, Indian American physicist and an internationally bestselling author, entrepreneur and philanthropist
- Anil Kumar Gain, Indian statistician and Mathematician, founder of Vidyasagar University
- Samit Bhanja, famous Indian actor
- Abha Maiti, Indian politician and lawyer, minister of state for Industry in the Morarji Desai government
- Ashok Dinda, Indian cricketer turned politician
- Suryakant Tripathi, Indian poet, novelist, essayist and writer. One of the most significant poets of Hindi literature
- Rai Sahib Bipin Bihari Sasmal, Zamindar, educationist and politician
- Phulrenu Guha, educationist and politician
- Biswanath Mukherjee, Indian politician and leader of Communist Party of India, one of the founder members of AISF
- Paresh Maity, painter and Padma Shri and awardee 2014
- Jadugopal Mukherjee, Indian politician and revolutionary, one of the leaders of Jugantar group
- Somenath Maity, Indian artist famous for urban landscape paintings
- Bhupal Chandra Panda, Indian revolutionary and politician
- Biplab Roy Chowdhury, politician
- Ashutosh Kuila, Indian revolution, freedom fighter, famously martyred during the Quit India Movement
- Suvendu Adhikari, Politician, Chief Minister, West Bengal
