= Suvendu Adhikari =

Chief Minister of West Bengal since 2026

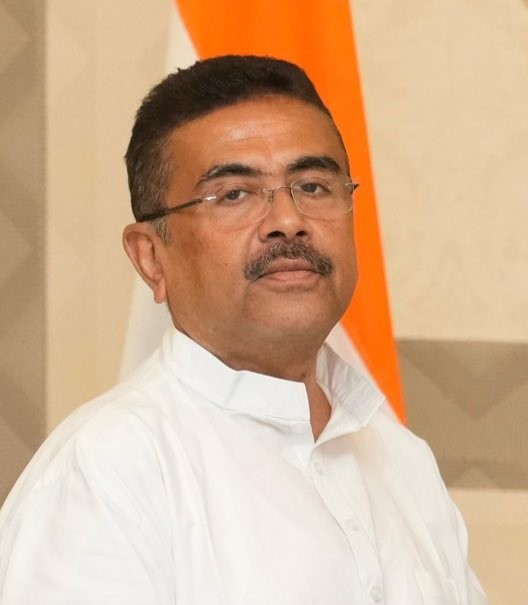
- Adhikari in 2026

9th Chief Minister of West Bengal
- Incumbent
- Assumed office 9 May 2026
- Governor: R. N. Ravi
- Cabinet: Adhikari ministry
- Department: List: Home and Hill Affairs; Land and Land Reforms & Refugee Relief and Rehabilitation; Power; Information and Cultural Affairs; Personnel and Administrative Reforms; Other Department not allotted to other Ministers
- Preceded by: Mamata Banerjee

Member of the West Bengal Legislative Assembly
- Incumbent
- Assumed office 13 May 2026
- Preceded by: Mamata Banerjee
- Constituency: Bhabanipur
- In office 19 May 2016 – 13 May 2026
- Preceded by: Phiroja Bibi
- Succeeded by: Hasirani Rath
- Constituency: Nandigram
- In office 11 May 2006 – 16 May 2009
- Preceded by: Sisir Adhikari
- Succeeded by: Dibyendu Adhikari
- Constituency: Contai South

12th Leader of the Opposition in the West Bengal Legislative Assembly
- In office 13 May 2021 – 9 May 2026
- Governor: Jagdeep Dhankhar; La. Ganesan (additional charge); C. V. Ananda Bose; R. N. Ravi
- Deputy: Mihir Goswami
- Preceded by: Abdul Mannan
- Succeeded by: Ritabrata Banerjee

Chairman of the Jute Corporation of India
- In office 31 December 2020 – 2 March 2021
- Union Textiles Minister: Smriti Irani
- Preceded by: Ajay Kumar Jolly

Cabinet Minister in West Bengal
- In office 27 May 2016 – 27 November 2020
- Chief Minister: Mamata Banerjee
- Departments: Irrigation and Waterways; Transport; Environment
- Preceded by: Aroop Biswas (Transport); Sovan Chatterjee (Environment)
- Succeeded by: Firhad Hakim (Transport); Mamata Banerjee (Environment)
- Constituency: Nandigram

Member of Parliament, Lok Sabha
- In office 16 May 2009 – 20 May 2016
- Preceded by: Lakshman Chandra Seth
- Succeeded by: Dibyendu Adhikari
- Constituency: Tamluk, West Bengal

Councillor of Kanthi Municipality
- In office 1995–2000

President of Trinamool Youth Congress
- In office 1 June 2011 – 13 December 2013
- Preceded by: Madan Mitra
- Succeeded by: Saumitra Khan

Personal details
- Born: 15 December 1970 (age 55) Contai, West Bengal, India
- Party: Bharatiya Janata Party (since 2020)
- Other political affiliations: Trinamool Congress (2000–2020); Indian National Congress (1995–2000)
- Parents: Sisir Adhikari (father); Gayatri Adhikari (mother)
- Relatives: Dibyendu Adhikari (brother); Soumendu Adhikari (brother)
- Education: Rabindra Bharati University (M.A)
- Occupation: Politician; businessman; social worker

Suvendu Adhikari (Bengali pronunciation: [ʃubʱend̪u od̪ʱikaɾi]; born 15 December 1970) is an Indian politician who is serving as the 9th chief minister of West Bengal since 2026. He is the first chief minister of West Bengal belonging to the Bharatiya Janata Party (BJP). Serving from Bhabanipur, West Bengal Assembly constituency

Having started his political career in the Indian National Congress in 1995, Adhikari later joined Mamata Banerjee's Trinamool Congress in 1998. He was first elected to the West Bengal legislative assembly from Kanthi Dakshin in 2006. Between 2009 and 2016, Adhikari served as the member of Parliament for Tamluk, before returning to the state legislature in 2016, representing Nandigram. Adhikari became a minister in the second Mamata Banerjee-led state government, serving as overseeing the department of Transport from 2016 to 2020, department of Irrigation and Water Resources from 2018 to 2020, and department of Environment from 2018 to 2020.

Citing disagreements, Adhikari resigned from the Trinamool Congress and the West Bengal cabinet in 2020, joining the Bharatiya Janata Party. At the 2021 assembly election, he was re-elected in his seat, defeating Banerjee. After the election, the BJP became the principal opposition in the state assembly, and Adhikari was chosen as leader of the opposition by party legislators.

Following the BJP's landslide victory at the 2026 assembly election and after winning from both Bhabanipur and Nandigram, vacating the latter, Adhikari was chosen by his party to become succeed Banerjee as chief minister.

== Early life and education ==
Adhikari was born on 15 December 1970 in a Bengali Brahmin Gaudiya Vaishnavite family to Sisir Adhikari and Gayatri Bhattacharjee at Karkuli in Purba Medinipur district in West Bengal. Sisir Adhikari is a politician, and former Minister of State in Second Manmohan Singh ministry and was elected to the Lok Sabha from Kanthi constituency in 2019.

In the 1980s, he was enrolled in Kanthi Prabhat Kumar College, Vidyasagar University. Adhikari received a Master of Arts degree in Environmental studies from Rabindra Bharati University in the year 2011.

== Personal Life ==
He is a registered voter in Nandigram.Adhikari is unmarried. He has two younger brothers Dibyendu Adhikari, Member of Legislative Assembly from Egra and Soumendu Adhikari, Member of Parliament from Kanthi. According to his affidavit He has asset about almost 8.5 Million Indian Rupees.

== Early political career ==
=== Entry into politics and initial years ===
Adhikari was first elected as a councillor from Indian National Congress in the Kanthi Municipality in 1995. In 2006, Adhikari was elected to the West Bengal Legislative Assembly from Kanthi Dakshin constituency. He also became the Chairman of Kanthi Municipality in the same year.

=== Nandigram movement and rise within Trinamool Congress ===
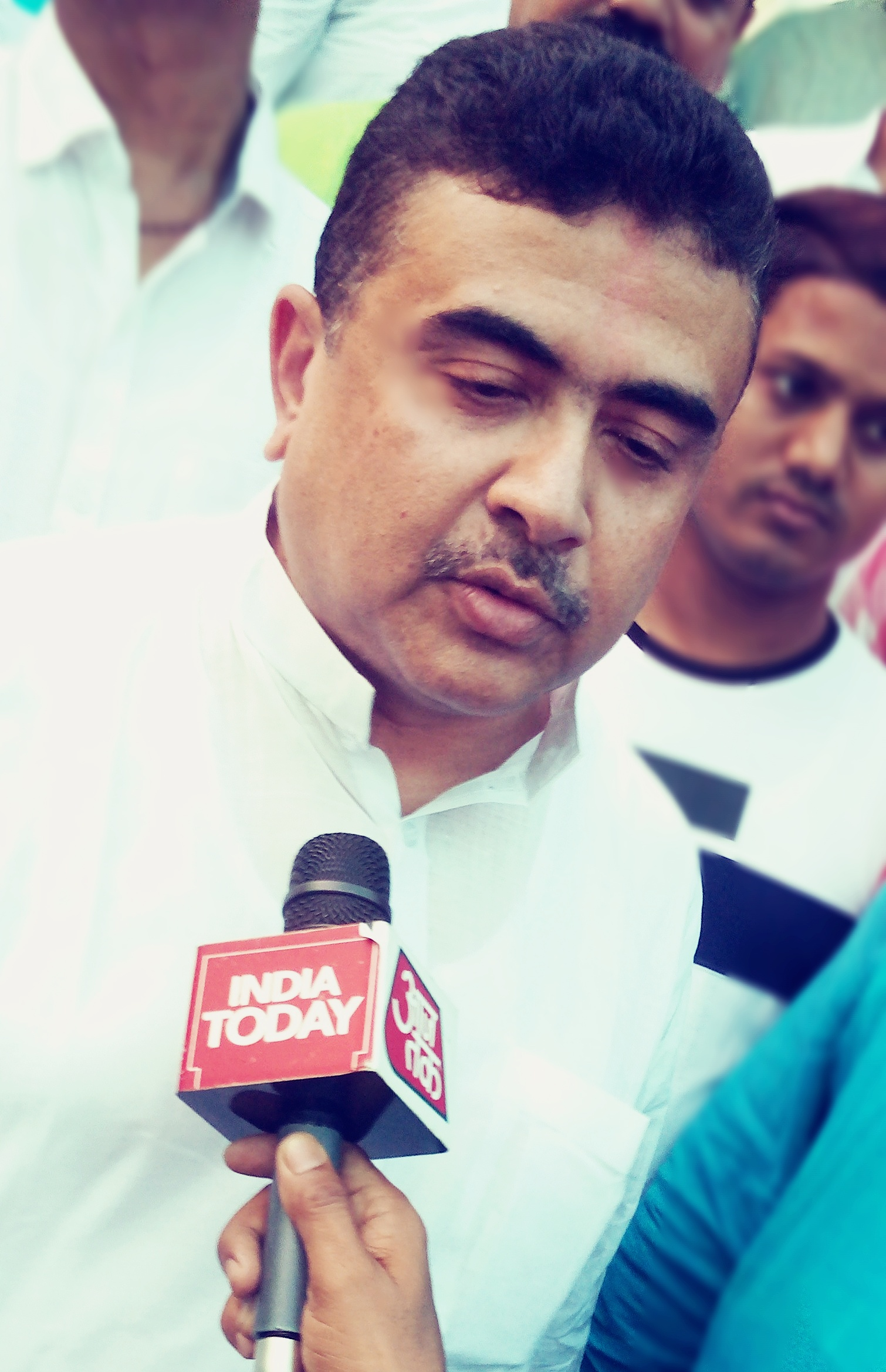
Adhikari in Nandigram Sitananda College

In 2007, Adhikari spearheaded the anti-land acquisition movement in the Nandigram. He led the Bhumi Uchhed Pratirodh Committee. The ruling Left Front government in West Bengal planned to acquire 10,000 acres of land in the village to set up a special economic zone. This movement catapulted Mamata Banerjee to the centre-stage of Bengali politics. The state CID alleged that Adhikari had supplied arms to the Maoists to wage an armed movement against the state government. After Adhikari's success in Nandigram, Banerjee made him the party's observer (in-charge) of the Jangal Mahal i.e. Paschim Medinipur, Purulia and Bankura districts. He was successful in expanding the party's base in these districts.

=== Member of Parliament ===
In 2009, he was elected to the Lok Sabha from the Tamluk constituency. He defeated his nearest rival Lakshman Seth of Communist Party of India (Marxist) by a margin of approximately 173,000 votes. As member of parliament, Adhikari became member of various committees. He was part of the Standing Committee on Industry from 2009 to 2014. Later he became part of the Standing Committee on Personnel, Public Grievances, Law and Justice from 2014 to 2016, and member of the Consultative Committee, Ministry of Petroleum and Natural Gas from 2014 to 2016. In 2011, he was made the president of the Trinamool Youth Congress, the youth wing of the party. During this time, Mamata Banerjee launched a parallel youth wing of the party named "All India Trinamool Yuva", which was led by her nephew, Abhishek Banerjee. Suvendu was replaced by Saumitra Khan in 2013, and later, Yuva was merged with Trinamool Youth Congress, and Abhishek Banerjee was made its president.

=== Re-entry to state legislature and minister in the state government ===
In the 2016 West Bengal Legislative Assembly election, Adhikari was pitted against Abdul Kadir Sheikh of the Left Front – Indian National Congress alliance in Nandigram constituency. After getting elected, he resigned as an MP from Tamluk constituency. He was sworn in as the Minister of Transport in the Second Mamata Banerjee ministry on 27 May 2016. During this time, he headed three major departments, namely, the department of Transport from 2016 to 2020, the department of Irrigation and Water Resources from 2018 to 2020, and department of Environment from 2018 to 2020.

During his tenure as minister for Transport, he directed the procurement of hundreds of new vehicles and modernisation of the existing fleet of State Transport Undertakings. At times of labour disruptions and strikes called by trade unions, he held meetings and negotiations. Besides, as minister for Irrigation, he also visited flood prone areas for making preparations and devising plans. He also frequently held meetings with local representatives to understand the problems and devise plans to mitigate flood-related issues. However, during his later days as minister, conflict between him and chief minister Mamata Banerjee surfaced. According to reports by Anandabazar Patrika, Adhikari wanted some reforms in the public transport sector. However, those proposals were rejected, and Mamata Banerjee even directed officials to not send any department related documents to Adhikari.

=== Rift within Trinamool Congress ===
Rift between Adhikari and Mamata Banerjee started surfacing since 2019. On many events of Mamata Banerjee, Adhikari avoided attendance. After the poor electoral performance of the Trinamool Congress in the 2019 elections, the party abolished the observer position. Suvendu, at that time, was the observer of multiple districts, including Murshidabad, Maldaha, Uttar Dinajpur, and many other districts in the Jungle Mahals region.

On 26 November 2020, Adhikari stepped down from the post of chairman of Hooghly River Bridge Commission (HRBC), a statutory body under the Government of West Bengal. He also resigned as West Bengal Transport Minister on 27 November 2020. He had tendered his resignation to the speaker of West Bengal Legislative Assembly as MLA on 16 December 2020 which was not accepted by the speaker initially on grounds of technicality. However, it was eventually accepted on 21 December 2020. On 17 December 2020 he resigned from the primary membership of All India Trinamool Congress.

=== Joining BJP ===
On 19 December 2020, he joined Bharatiya Janata Party in presence of Home Minister Amit Shah.

Adhikari's defection was reportedly caused due his rivalry with Mamata Banerjee's nephew Abhishek Banerjee, who was being groomed as her heir-apparent. His influence in Trinamool Congress led to further defections, and many of his followers joined the BJP later.

=== 2021 elections ===
He defeated the sitting chief minister of West Bengal Mamata Banerjee in Nandigram assembly seat in 2021 West Bengal Legislative Assembly election by 1,956 votes. Mamata Banerjee has filed an election petition in Calcutta High Court challenging the verdict of Nandigram.

== Leader of Opposition in West Bengal (2021–2026) ==
Adhikari (right) with Prime Minister of India Narendra Modi (centre) and Governer of West Bengal, CV Ananda Bose (left)

Adhikari served as the Leader of the Opposition in the West Bengal Legislative Assembly from May 2021 until the conclusion of the Assembly term in May 2026. He was elected as the leader of the BJP legislature party in the legislative assembly on 10 May, and his appointment was announced by then Union Minister Ravi Shankar Prasad. After defeating the incumbent chief minister Mamata Banerjee in Nandigram constituency, his stature rose in the politics of West Bengal.

=== Legislative opposition ===
BJP legislators under his leadership repeatedly protested inside the Assembly over allegations relating to political violence, corruption, law and order, recruitment irregularities, and communal tensions. During the 17th assembly, Adhikari along with many other opposition legislators were suspended from Assembly sessions.

=== Response to post-poll violence ===
After the conclusion of the 2021 elections, large scale violence took place across West Bengal, and numerous BJP workers and volunteers were targeted. During this time, Adhikari emerged as one of the principal opposition voices regarding the incidents of alleged post-poll violence reported from several parts of the state. He also played a significant role in documenting complaints related to the violence and supported legal petitions seeking judicial intervention. Adhikari demanded investigations by central agencies and sought compensation and rehabilitation for affected party workers. The Calcutta High Court subsequently ordered investigations into several incidents linked to post-poll violence and even constituted a court-monitored process in certain cases. He led a delegation of the violence affected victims to meet the Governor, however, he was blocked by the state administration. Adhikari organised visits to affected districts and offered relief money for the damages during the violence.

=== Sandeshkhali agitation ===
Adhikari has been a major opposition voice concerning the unrest and allegations of atrocities in Sandeshkhali and become became the face of BJP's campaign over the unrest. Through press conferences, Assembly protests, social media campaigns, and visits to affected areas, he consistently highlighted allegations made by local residents; bringing national political attention to Sandeshkhali. He repeatedly attempted to visit the affected region, leading to confrontations with the police and the state administration. On several occasions he was detained while travelling to the area. Later, after intervention by the Calcutta High Court, Adhikari was permitted to visit Sandeshkhali. Specifically, he was allowed to visit two areas in Sandeshkhali, namely, Jeliapara and Halderpara. During his visit, he and his fellow legislator Sankar Ghosh met local residents and women protesters who narrated alleged experiences of intimidation and abuse. After the visit, he described the situation as "horrific" and an example of "complete lawlessness". Later, he arranged BJP membership drive in Sandeshkhali, and criticised dominance of minorities while urging for "Hindu Unity".

=== 2024 Indian general election ===
Among the BJP leaders in Bengal, Suvendu Adhikari emerged as one of the central figures of the party's campaign in 2024 Indian general election in West Bengal. Adhikari's regional network played an important role in maintaining the BJP's strength in parts of East Midnapore during the election. According to reports from The Statesman, BJP had given Adhikari a "free hand" during the Lok Sabha campaign, and he had major influence over candidate selection and campaign management in multiple constituencies. However, after the result, the BJP was reduced to 12 seats; 6 less compared to its 2019 performance. Many leaders within the BJP targeted Adhikari's approach, and his interference in the candidate selection. Adhikari, however, alleged that electoral irregularities and "false voting" had affected the party's prospects in several constituencies.

=== 2026 elections ===
In 2026 West Bengal Legislative Assembly elections, Suvendu simultaneously contested in both Nandigram as well as Bhabanipur, the seat held by outgoing CM Mamata Banerjee and won both by a large margin. The last time when an incumbent CM was defeated on their own seat by a person contesting in 2 seats was in 1967, when Ajoy Mukherjee of Bangla Congress defeated the then CM Prafulla Chandra Sen of the Congress party in his Arambag seat while retaining his own Tamluk seat.

After his 2026 election win, Suvendu Adhikari claimed support came mainly from Hindu, Buddhist, Jain, and Sikh voters, not Muslim voters. He said Muslim votes largely went to the opposition, highlighting religious voting patterns.

On the night of 6 May 2026, assailants on bikes shot dead Chandranath Rath who was Suvendu's personal assistant .

== Chief Minister of West Bengal (2026–present) ==
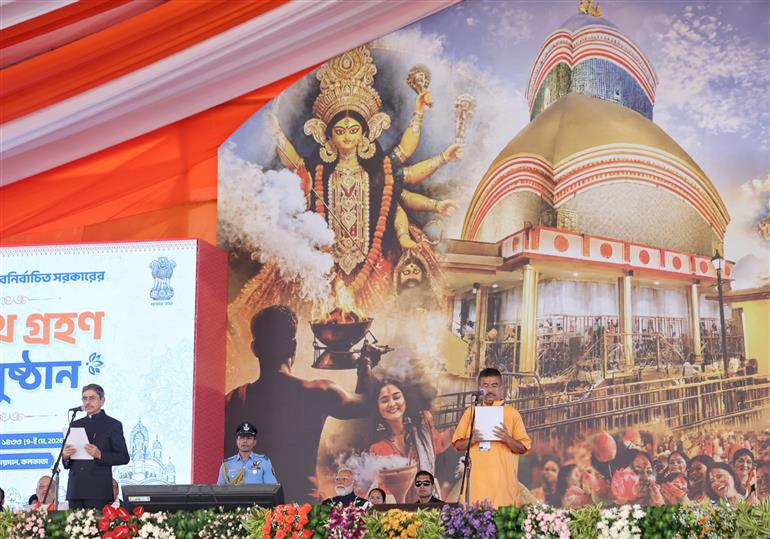
Swearing ceremony of Suvendu Adhikari as Chief Minister of West Bengal

On 8 May 2026, he was elected leader of the Bharatiya Janata Party legislative party in West Bengal in the presence of central observer Amit Shah. Adhikari took the oath as the Chief Minister of West Bengal on 9 May 2026 at the Brigade Parade Ground in Kolkata, becoming the first chief minister from Bharatiya Janata Party

=== General administration ===
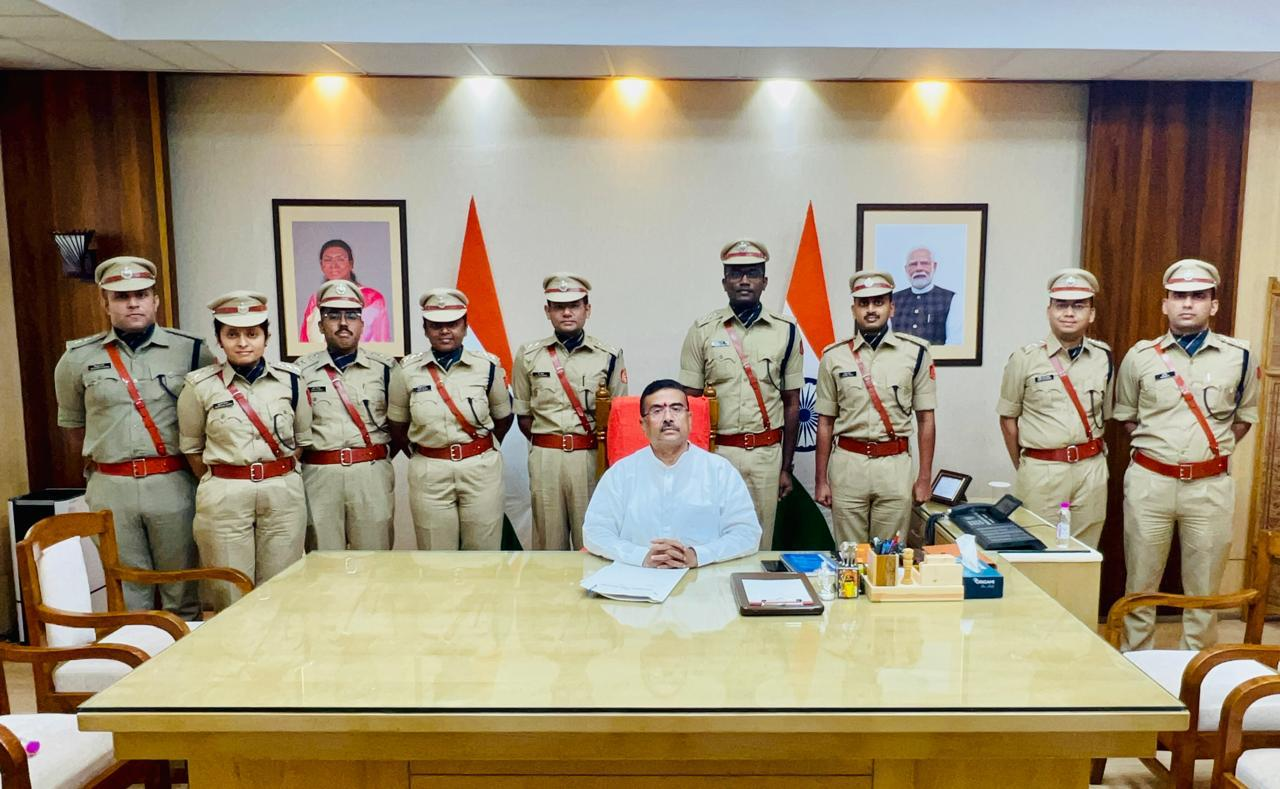
Adhikari meeting 2023 IPS officers after becoming CM

Adhikari giving appointment letter to the newly selected candidates for the posts in Kolkata Police.

Along with Adhikari, five other ministers were sworn in on the same day, and they were allocated their ministries on 11 May 2026. His administration took numerous decisions on the first cabinet meeting held. This included the implementation of the Ayushman Bharat, the flagship healthcare scheme of the Modi government. Additionally, transfer of land in the border areas to the Border Security Force was also being done by his administration. The age limit for job seekers for government jobs in the state was also increased by five years. The Bharatiya Nyay Sanhita was also being implemented across the state by the Adhikari government.

On 23 June under his leadership, state finance minister Swapan Dasgupta announced Kolkata, Basirhat, Sundarbans, Jangipur, Arambag to be five new districts for better administrative reform. Districts will be craved out from North 24 Parganas district, South 24 Parganas, Murshidabad, Hooghly district respectively. On 12 August, his government introduced two bills that allows delimitation of Kolkata Municipal Corporation, municipal area would increase 144 to 209.and wards in the Howrah municipal area will increase from 50 to 68.

=== Industrialisation ===
On 11 July 2026, Adhikari laid the foundation of ₹600-crore Lux Cozi garment hub in Bengal, in this ceremony State Ministers Tapas Roy, Arjun Singh, Dr Sharadwat Mukherjee, and Bharatiya Janta Party State president Samik Bhattacharya, Rajya members and others were also present at the event.

On 17 July 2026, he laid the foundation stone of Shyam Steel's 15,000 crore extension project of a steel plant at Mejia in Bankura district, around 200 km from Kolkata.

In his term as the chief minister, Adhikari allotted land to Amul (officially Anand Milk Union Limited) for building the largest curd production unit in Sankrail, Howrah, where Amul is said to be investing 700 crore rupees. On 19 July, home minister Amit Shah laid the foundation stone of the plant as the chief guest.

On 17 August, Adhikari laid foundation for Amit Metaliks Steel Plant Extention In Durmut village at Raghunathpur of Purulia district, spanning 148 acres and aimed to stop mass migration by creating about 10000 direct and indirect jobs.

On 27 August, Adhikari inaugurated Larsen & Toubro's subsidiary LTIMindtree's new IT Campus, named Ananda Niketan in Bengal Silicon Valley Tech Hub New Town, Kolkata.

== Electoral history ==
| Year | House | Constituency | Party | Votes | % | Opponent | Opponent Party | Opponent Votes | % | Margin | in % | Result |
|---|---|---|---|---|---|---|---|---|---|---|---|---|
| 2001 | Vidhan Sabha | Mugberia | AITC | 59,724 | 46.90% | Kiran Moy Nanda | WBSP | 64,415 | 50.58% | −4,691 | −3.68% | Lost |
| 2006 | Vidhan Sabha | Kanthi Dakshin | AITC | 68,608 | 50.60% | Satyendra Nath Panda | CPI | 60,028 | 38.31% | 8,580 | 6.30% | Won |
| 2004 | Lok Sabha | Tamluk | AITC | 4,49,848 | 43.60% | Lakshman Chandra Seth | CPI(M) | 5,07,228 | 49.20% | −57,380 | −5.60% | Lost |
| 2009 | Lok Sabha | Tamluk | AITC | 6,37,664 | 55.54% | Lakshman Chandra Seth | CPI(M) | 4,64,706 | 40.50% | 1,72,958 | 15.90% | Won |
| 2014 | Lok Sabha | Tamluk | AITC | 7,16,928 | 53.60% | Sheikh Ibrahim Ali | CPI(M) | 4,70,447 | 35.20% | 2,46,481 | 18.40% | Won |
| 2016 | Vidhan Sabha | Nandigram | AITC | 1,34,623 | 67.20% | Abdul Kabir Sekh | CPI | 53,393 | 26.70% | 81,230 | 40.60% | Won |
| 2021 | Vidhan Sabha | Nandigram | BJP | 1,10,764 | 48.49% | Mamata Banerjee | AITC | 1,08,808 | 47.64% | 1,956 | 0.85% | Won |
| 2026 | Vidhan Sabha | Bhabanipur | BJP | 73,917 | 53.02% | Mamata Banerjee | AITC | 58,812 | 42.19% | 15,105 | 10.83% | Won |
| 2026 | Vidhan Sabha | Nandigram | BJP | 1,27,301 | 50.37% | Pabitra Kar | AITC | 1,17,636 | 46.55% | 9,665 | 3.82% | Won |

== Political stances ==
=== Immigration and the CAA ===
Suvendu Adhikari has advocated for stricter measures against illegal immigration in West Bengal. On 25 October 2025, he claimed that the Bharatiya Janata Party (BJP) was not against Indian Muslims; rather, they wished to deport Rohingya Muslim refugees, whom he called "infiltrators". He has accused the Trinamool Congress (TMC) government of assisting in the settlement of these refugees using fake documents and facilitating their inclusion in voter lists. He claimed that there were 90 lakh "fake voters" in Bengal.

Particularly in the wake of the political instability in Bangladesh and anti-Hindu violence there in 2024 and 2025, Adhikari has linked the concern over immigration of Bangladeshi Muslims to the need for greater border security, claiming that the Hindu-majority West Bengal's demographic change was being accelerated by illegal immigration of Muslims. He has demanded increased surveillance at the border to prevent what he deems uncontrolled immigration, organised protests near the India-Bangladesh border, and threatened to impose trade sanctions if attacks on Hindus continued. On 17 October 2025, he assured Indian Muslims that the Election Commission's Special Intensive Revision (SIR) of the voter list would only target "Bangladeshi Muslim infiltrators", not any valid citizens, and that the SIR is part of an effort to purify the electoral rolls without affecting the native population.

Adhikari campaigned for the implementation of the Citizenship Amendment Act (CAA) to grant citizenship to persecuted Hindu refugees from Bangladesh. On 25 October 2025, he urged Bangladeshi Hindu refugees in West Bengal to apply for citizenship at CAA awareness camps. During the 2024 unrest in Bangladesh, he warned of up to 1 crore Hindu refugees fleeing to West Bengal, called for the state to be prepared, and cited the CAA's provisions for non-Muslim refugees who entered from neighbouring countries before 31 December 2014.

=== Bangladesh ===
Suvendu Adhikari has frequently made statements concerning violence against Hindus in Bangladesh and India Bangladesh relations. In December 2025, he warned that he would disrupt the functioning of Bangladesh's Deputy High Commission in Kolkata over the lynching of Dipu Das in Bangladesh. During a later protest, he said that if the violence against Hindus did not stop, India's Hindus would be "teaching a lesson" to Bangladesh as Israel had done to Gaza and India had done to Pakistan. This drew sharp criticism from the Trinamool Congress, which called the speech a "bloodthirsty call for mass murder and ethnic cleansing".

In 2024, the TMC accused Suvendu Adhikari of making communal remarks before bypolls and complained to the Election Commission. During the 2025 Murshidabad violence, Adhikari alleged attacks on Hindus and criticised law enforcement. In 2025, he also drew criticism for advising against travel to Muslim-majority areas.

=== Corruption ===
Adhikari has accused the TMC of large-scale corruption.

==== Chit fund scandal ====
Adhikari has spoken extensively about West Bengal's chit fund scandals, alleging the involvement of the Trinamool Congress leadership and the state administration. In July 2023, he publicly offered to supply the Central Bureau of Investigation (CBI) with evidence concerning Chief Minister Mamata Banerjee's alleged involvement in the Saradha Group financial scandal, while accusing the agency of hesitancy in interrogating high-ranking officials. Earlier, in March 2023, he wrote to Prime Minister Narendra Modi, questioning the CBI's reluctance to take action against high-placed individuals accused in the decade-old Sarada case, and called for decisive steps to dismantle state-level protection rackets. In a separate letter to the CBI Director that same month, he highlighted delays in the investigation of multiple chit fund operations, alleging that Kunal Ghosh, a TMC politician, had influenced the probe even from custody.

Adhikari himself was questioned by the CBI in 2014 over the Saradha Group financial scandal, which allegedly defrauded investors of about ₹25,000 crore. Though investigated for alleged links with Saradha-backed media and events, he was not named in any chargesheet. In 2020, Saradha chief Sudipta Sen accused Adhikari of extortion and promoting the scheme, allegations Adhikari denied as politically motivated. As of October 2025, no charges against him had resulted in conviction.

==== Sandeshkhali raid ====
After the April 2024 Sandeshkhali raid by the CBI, Adhikari claimed that uncovered weaponry linked the TMC to the assault on Enforcement Directorate staff. He demanded that Mamata Banerjee be arrested and that the TMC be declared a terrorist organisation.

=== Post-poll violence ===
Following the declaration of the West Bengal Assembly election results on 2 May 2021, Adhikari compiled documentation of the post-election violence, including videos and affidavits detailing attacks on BJP workers that began on 3 May. In May 2021, he filed a writ petition in the Calcutta High Court, annexing evidence of targeted attacks, property destruction, and displacement across various districts, which led to judicial monitoring and orders for registering FIRs. As a result of these efforts, in July 2021, amid the government's denial of retaliatory violence against opposition supporters, the High Court issued a mandatory directive compelling the state to register cases for all reported incidents and to cooperate with the National Human Rights Commission's investigation.

== Posts held ==
Posts held by Suvendu Adhikari
| No. | Post | Tenure | Term Length | Political Party |
|---|---|---|---|---|
| 1 | Councillor of the Kanthi Municipality | 1995 – 2000 | 5 years | INC |
| 2 | Member of the West Bengal Legislative Assembly, Contai South | 11 May 2006 – 16 May 2009 | 3 years, 5 days | AITC |
| 3 | Member of Parliament, Lok Sabha from Tamluk | 16 May 2009 – 20 May 2016 | 7 years, 4 days | AITC |
| 4 | Committee member in Parliament of India | 2009 – 2016 | 7 years | AITC |
| 5 | President of Trinamool Youth Congress | 1 June 2011 – 13 December 2013 | 2 years, 195 days | AITC |
| 6 | Member of the West Bengal Legislative Assembly, Nandigram | 19 May 2016 – 21 December 2020 | 4 years, 216 days | AITC |
| 7 | Cabinet Minister, Government of West Bengal | 27 May 2016 – 27 November 2020 | 4 years, 184 days | AITC |
| 8 | Chairman of the Jute Corporation of India | 21 December 2020 – 2 March 2021 | 71 days | BJP |
| 9 | Member of the West Bengal Legislative Assembly, Nandigram | 8 May 2021 – 13 May 2026 | 5 years, 5 days | BJP |
| 10 | Leader of the Opposition of the West Bengal Legislative Assembly | 13 May 2021 – 7 May 2026 | 4 years, 359 days | BJP |
| 11 | State legislative leader of Bharatiya Janata Party, West Bengal | 13 May 2021 – Incumbent | 5 years, 193 days | BJP |
| 12 | Chief Minister of West Bengal | 9 May 2026 – Incumbent | 197 days | BJP |
| 13 | Cabinet Minister, Government of West Bengal | 9 May 2026 – Incumbent | 197 days | BJP |
| 14 | Member of the West Bengal Legislative Assembly, Bhabanipur | 13 May 2026 – Incumbent | 193 days | BJP |

== See also ==
- 2021 Nandigram controversy
