= Guha Research Conference =

Guha Research Conference (GRC) is a professional society set up by Indian scholars to develop the field of Biochemistry. It was established in 1960, and is named after Biresh Chandra Guha (1904-1962).

The first four GRC meetings were held alongside the annual conference of the Indian Science Congress. Subsequently, under the guidance of Pushpa Mittra Bhargava, it was registered as a society with a convener elected annually, to organize the annual conference. According to Parthasarathi Benerjee, affiliation to GRC, "acts as the token, assuring easier access to prizes of several sorts."

During its formative years (1960–65), GRC had 33 professionals from major national institutes such as AIIMS, CMC Vellore, IISc, Tata Memorial Centre, Indian Institute of Chemical Biology, Banaras Hindu University, Bhabha Atomic Research Centre, and TIFR. By 2004, the membership had grown to 114 members.

== Related Pages ==
- Pushpa Mittra Bhargava
- Gordon Research Conferences
