= Sisir Adhikari =

Indian politician (born 1941)

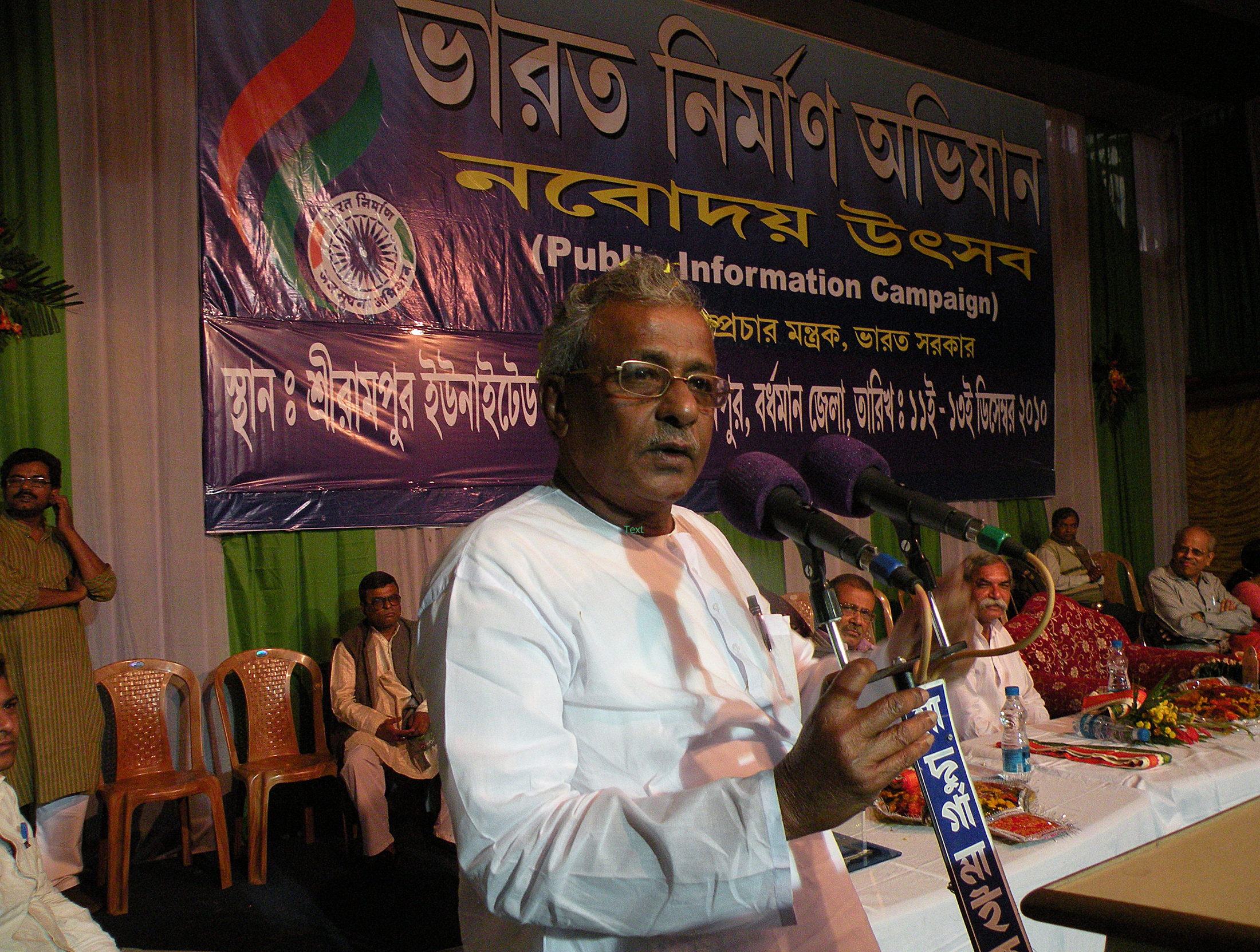
- Adhikari addressing the inaugural session of Bharat Nirman Public Information Campaign in Hooghly, December 2010

Member of Parliament, Lok Sabha
- In office 16 May 2009 – 4 June 2024
- Preceded by: Prasanta Pradhan
- Succeeded by: Soumendu Adhikari
- Constituency: Kanthi, West Bengal

Union Minister of State for Rural Development
- In office 25 May 2009 – 22 September 2012
- Prime Minister: Manmohan Singh

Member of West Bengal Legislative Assembly
- In office 11 May 2006 – 16 May 2009
- Preceded by: Prabodh Chandra Sinha
- Succeeded by: Samares Das
- Constituency: Egra
- In office 1982–1987
- Preceded by: Sailaja Kumar Das, Congress
- Succeeded by: Sukhendu Maity, CPI
- Constituency: Kanthi Dakshin
- In office 13 May 2001 – 11 May 2006
- Preceded by: Sailaja Kumar Das, INC
- Succeeded by: Suvendu Adhikari, AITC
- Constituency: Kanthi Dakshin

Personal details
- Born: 19 September 1941 (age 85) Karkuli, Bengal Province, British India
- Party: Bharatiya Janata Party (2021–present)
- Other political affiliations: Trinamool Congress (2000–2021); Indian National Congress (until 2000)
- Spouse: Gayatri Adhikari
- Children: 4; including: Suvendu; Dibyendu; Soumendu
- Education: University of Calcutta

Sisir Kumar Adhikari (born 19 September 1941) is an Indian politician who represented Kanthi Lok Sabha constituency from 2009 till 2024. He is a former Union Minister of State for Rural Development in the Manmohan Singh government. He is the father of Suvendu Adhikari, the 9th Chief Minister of West Bengal.

He was the Member of Legislative Assembly from Kanthi Dakshin from 2001 to 2006 and Egra from 2006 to 2009. He was the chairman of Contai Municipality for more than 25 years. Along with his son Suvendu, who was elected from Tamluk, he played a key role in the Nandigram anti-land acquisition stir.

== Early life and education ==
Adhikari was born on 19 September 1941 to father Kenaram Adhikari and mother Kadambini Adhikari in Karkuli, Purba Medinipur, West Bengal in an affluent family of freedom fighters. He studied Intermediate of Science at University of Calcutta and passed in 1960.

== Personal life ==
Adhikari is married to Gayatri Adhikari and has four sons, including Suvendu Adhikari, the Chief Minister of West Bengal, Dibyendu Adhikari, Member of Legislative Assembly from Egra and Soumendu Adhikari, Member of Parliament from Kanthi.
