= Nandigram South Assembly constituency =

Former West Bengal Legislative Assembly constituency

Nandigram South Assembly constituency was an assembly constituency in Purba Medinipur district in the Indian state of West Bengal.

== Members of Legislative Assembly ==
Election Year	Member	Party affiliation	ref.
1951	Prabir Chandra Jana	Indian National Congress	
1957	Bhupal Chandra Panda	Communist Party of India	
1962	Prabir Chandra Jana	Indian National Congress	
