= Soumendu Adhikari =

Indian politician

Member of Parliament, Lok Sabha
- Incumbent
- Assumed office 4 June 2024
- Preceded by: Sisir Adhikari
- Constituency: Kanthi

Personal details
- Born: 10 March 1983 (age 43) Kanthi, West Bengal, India
- Party: Bharatiya Janata Party
- Parent: Sisir Adhikari (father)
- Relatives: Suvendu Adhikari (brother); Dibyendu Adhikari (brother)
- Occupation: Politician

Soumendu Adhikari is an Indian politician and the elected candidate for Lok Sabha from Kanthi Lok Sabha constituency. He is a member of the Bharatiya Janata Party. He is the brother of Suvendu Adhikari (Chief Minister) of West Bengal and son of Sisir Adhikari (former Member of Parliament, Lok Sabha).

== See also ==
- 18th Lok Sabha
- Bharatiya Janata Party
- Kanthi Lok Sabha constituency
