= Samares Das =

Indian politician

Member of the West Bengal Legislative Assembly
- In office 2009–2020
- Preceded by: Sisir Kumar Adhikari
- Succeeded by: Tarun Kumar Maity
- Constituency: Egra

Personal details
- Born: 10 February 1945
- Died: 17 August 2020 (aged 75)
- Party: Trinamool Congress
- Education: MA, University of Calcutta (B.Ed., 1980)
- Profession: Politician

Samares Das (10 February 1945 – 17 August 2020) was an Indian politician from West Bengal. He was elected three times to the West Bengal Legislative Assembly from Egra Assembly constituency in Purba Medinipur district. He was last elected in the 2016 West Bengal Legislative Assembly election representing the All India Trinamool Congress. He is the third West Bengal politician who died of COVID 19.

== Early life and education ==
Das was from East Medinipur district, West Bengal. He was the son of late Paresh Chandra Das. He completed his post graduation in commerce at the University of Calcutta in 1969. He later did BEd at Contai PK College in 1980.

== Career ==
Das was first elected as an MLA in the Egra Assembly constituency representing All India Trinamool Congress in the 2009 West Bengal Legislative Assembly by election necessitated by the election of the sitting MLA Sisir Adhikari to Parliament from Kanthi Lok Sabha constituency. In 2009, he polled 72,403 votes and defeated his nearest rival, Prabodh Chandra Sinha of the Democratic Socialist Political Party (Prabodh Chandra), by a margin of 5,950 votes.

He retained the seat for the Trinamool Congress in the 2011 West Bengal Legislative Assembly election and won for a third time in the 2016 West Bengal Legislative Assembly election. In 2011, he got 99,178 votes and defeated his closest rival, Hrisikesh Paria of the DSP (PC), by a margin of 15,953 votes. In 2016, he polled 113,334 votes, and beat Shaikh Mahmud Hossain, also of the Democratic Socialist Political Party, by 25,956 votes.

=== Death ===
Das tested positive for Corona virus and died, on 17 August 2020, at a hospital in East Medinipur after he developed complications of heart and kidneys.
