= Democratic Socialist Party (Prabodh Chandra) =

- Abbreviation: DSP, DSP(PC)
- Founder: Prabodh Chandra Sinha
- Founded: 17 July 1981 (45 years ago)
- Dissolved: 23 November 2025 (9 months ago)
- Merged into: All India Forward Bloc
- Ideology: Democratic socialism
- Political position: Left-wing
- Colours: Red
- Alliance: Left Front (1982–2017)

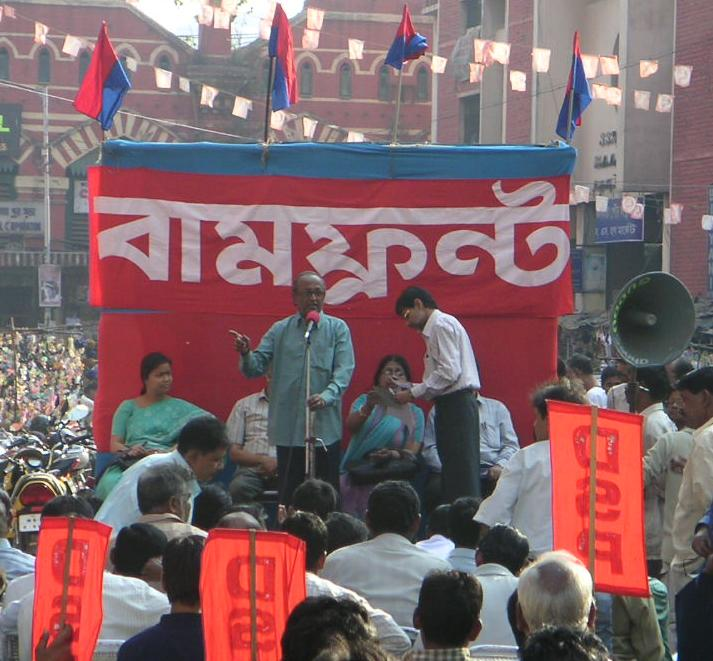
DSP-meeting in Kolkata

Democratic Socialist Party (DSP) was a Democratic Socialist political party in India. The party was formed in 1981 when H.N Bahuguna came out of the then Janata Party and took the lead in forming it. The party was formed when the Bengali socialists, who had been part of Janata Party, were divided in two in the beginning of the 1980s. The other faction became the West Bengal Socialist Party. Afterwards, on 23 November 2025, DSP merged with All India Forward Bloc.

DSP was a part of the Left Front in West Bengal. The party leader Prabodh Chandra Sinha, was a Minister of Parliamentary Affairs in the Left Front government then. Sinha was elected to the state assembly in 2001 as an independent candidate from the Egra constituency. At that time DSP was not registered with the Election Commission of India. Later on, the party was once again registered, under the name Democratic Socialist Party (Prabodh Chandra). DSP had influence in parts of East Midnapore and West Midnapore. DSP had tried to contact the Socialist International, but have been denied membership on the grounds that they are a regional party.

DSP won the Pingla constituency seat in the 2011 West Bengal Assembly election, with the Party's candidate, Prof. Prabodh Singha, winning the sear as a Left Front candidate. They party's other candidate, Prof. Hrishikesh Paria, lost the Egra seat in East Midnapore. DSP also held a Zilla Parishad seat in East Midnapore district and had a municipal seat in the Egra municipality following the 2009 municipal election. IN the 2010 Kolkata Municipal corp. election, the party was allotted two seats two contest as a Left Front partner, in Wards 45 & 72. However, it lost both seats. The party had earlier won a Zilla Parishad seat in East Midnapore in the 2008 panchayat election. DSP followed the ideals of Jayaprakash Narayan, Ram Manohar Lohia, And Narendra Dev. Although Prabodh Sinha won the Pinglaseat in the 2011 West Bengal Legislative Assembly election, the party lost the seat in the 2016 election.

DSP merged with All India Forward Bloc on 23 November 2025.
