= Prabodh Chandra Sinha =

Indian politicians

Member of West Bengal Legislative Assembly
- In office 1971–1972
- Preceded by: Bibhuti Pahari
- Succeeded by: Khan Samsul Alam
- Constituency: Egra
- In office 1977–2006
- Preceded by: Khan Samsul Alam
- Succeeded by: Sisir Adhikari
- Constituency: Egra
- In office 13 May 2011 – 19 May 2016
- Preceded by: Ramapada Samanta
- Succeeded by: Soumen Mahapatra
- Constituency: Pingla

Personal details
- Party: Democratic Socialist Party
- Education: University of Calcutta
- Profession: Politician

Prabodh Chandra Sinha is an Indian politician from West Bengal. He was elected as a Member of the Legislative Assembly in 2011 West Bengal Legislative Assembly election from Pingla, as a member of the Democratic Socialist Party (Prabodh Chandra).
