= Sudhir Kumar Giri =

Indian politician (1933–2008)

Member of Parliament, Lok Sabha
- In office 1980–1984
- Preceded by: Samar Guha
- Succeeded by: Phulrenu Guha
- In office 1989–1999
- Preceded by: Phulrenu Guha
- Succeeded by: Nitish Sengupta
- Constituency: Contai, West Bengal

Member of the Legislative Assembly, West Bengal
- In office 1987–1989
- Constituency: Ramnagar

Personal details
- Born: 13 May 1933 Kalapunja, Midnapore District, Bengal Presidency, British India
- Died: 21 April 2008 (aged 74) Kolkata, West Bengal
- Party: Communist Party of India (Marxist)

Sudhir Kumar Giri was an Indian politician belonging to the Communist Party of India (Marxist). He was elected to the Lok Sabha the lower house of Indian Parliament from Contai constituency, West Bengal in 1980, 1989, 1991, 1996 and 1998.He was elected to the West Bengal Legislative assembly from Ramnagar, Purba Medinipur (Vidhan Sabha constituency) in 1987.
