= Chandranath Rath =

Indian political aide and former airman (1985–2026)

- Born: October 7, 1985; Kolkata, West Bengal, India
- Died: May 6, 2026 (aged 40); Madhyamgram, North 24 Parganas district, West Bengal, India
- Cause of death: Assassination by shooting
- Occupations: Political assistant, former Indian Air Force airman
- Employer: Suvendu Adhikari
- Known for: Executive assistant to BJP leader Suvendu Adhikari
- Parents: Onkar Nath Rath (father); Hasi Rani Rath (mother)

Chandranath Rath (7 October 1985 – 6 May 2026) was an Indian political strategist, executive assistant, and former technical tradesman in the Indian Air Force. He was from Chandipur, Purba Medinipur in West Bengal. He served as the close aide and personal assistant to Bharatiya Janata Party leader Suvendu Adhikari.

Rath was assassinated in Madhyamgram, Barasat, West Bengal on 6 May 2026, amid the severe post-election political violence that followed the 2026 West Bengal Legislative Assembly election.

== Career ==
Before entering the political sphere, Rath served in the Indian Air Force for two decades. He transitioned into politics and became the executive assistant to Suvendu Adhikari in 2021, handling his office operations, strategy, and election-related work. Within political circles, BJP leaders often described him as "Mr. Dependable" due to his quiet strategic acumen and tight coordination of Adhikari's campaigns. His tenure coincided with Adhikari's prominent victory over Chief Minister Mamata Banerjee in the Bhabanipur constituency in 2026.

== Assassination ==
On the night of Wednesday, 6 May 2026, at approximately 10:30 pm, Rath was returning from Kolkata to his flat at Orchard Estate in Madhyamgram, located in the North 24 Parganas district. As his SUV reached Doharia on Jessore Road, about 200 metres from his residence, the vehicle was intercepted.

According to police and eyewitness reports, a silver Santro car (registration WB74AX2270) overtook Rath's SUV and forced it to slow down. Immediately after, a motorcycle without a registration plate approached the vehicle. The assailants fired at the front windshield, before firing multiple rounds at point-blank range directly at Rath, who was seated in the front. Up to 10 rounds were fired, striking him in the chest, abdomen, and head.

The driver of the SUV was also critically injured and was admitted to SSKM Hospital in Kolkata. Rath was rushed to Diversity Nursing Home but was declared dead upon arrival.

== Investigation ==
The police launched an immediate investigation into the assassination, suspecting a highly premeditated hit. Forensics teams recovered multiple bullet casings at the scene, suggesting the potential use of a Glock pistol. A large contingent of police and central forces was subsequently deployed to cordon off the area and maintain order. Detectives detained three local history-sheeters for questioning, though the primary shooters remained at large.

== Political Reactions ==
The killing, occurring merely 48 hours after the conclusion of the volatile assembly elections, sparked a fierce political storm across West Bengal. The BJP leadership condemned the attack as a "targeted assassination," accusing the ruling All India Trinamool Congress of orchestrating retaliatory violence following their electoral losses to Adhikari. Rath's mother also publicly accused the TMC of a planned attack in response to Mamata Banerjee's poll defeat.

The Trinamool Congress vehemently denied the allegations. In an official statement, the TMC condemned the brutal murder, called for a thorough CBI probe, and highlighted that their own workers were concurrently suffering from violence instigated by BJP-backed miscreants.

== See also ==
- Suvendu Adhikari
