= Khan Samsul Alam =

West Bengal politician

- (Kuna)

Member of West Bengal Legislative Assembly
- In office 1972–1977
- Preceded by: Prabodh Chandra Sinha
- Succeeded by: Prabodh Chandra Sinha
- Constituency: Egra

Personal details
- Born: 1931 Kasbagola, Midnapore, Bengal Presidency
- Died: Kasbagola
- Party: Indian National Congress

Khan Samsul Alam is an Indian politician belonging to the Indian National Congress. He was the MLA of Egra Assembly constituency in the West Bengal Legislative Assembly.

== Early life and family ==
Alam was born into a Bengali family of Muslim Khans in Midnapore district, Bengal Presidency.

== Career ==
Alam contested in the 1972 West Bengal Legislative Assembly election where he ran as an Indian National Congress candidate for Egra Assembly constituency, defeating Socialist politician Prabodh Chandra Sinha.
