= Pramathanath Banerjee =

Indian politician

Member of Parliament, Lok Sabha
- In office 1957–1962
- Preceded by: Basanta Kumar Das
- Succeeded by: Basanta Kumar Das
- Constituency: Contai, West Bengal

Personal details
- Born: 16 January 1885 Contai, Midnapore District, Bengal Presidency, British India
- Party: Praja Socialist Party
- Spouse: Saratkumari Devi

Pramathanath Banerjee was an Indian politician. He was elected to the Lok Sabha, the lower house of Indian Parliament from Contai constituency, West Bengal as a member of the Praja Socialist Party.

== Early life and education ==
He was educated at the Calcutta University.

== Career ==
He joined the non-cooperation movement and was imprisoned.

=== Member of Parliament ===
He was elected to the second Lok Sabha from Contai.
