= Basanta Kumar Das (Indian politician) =

Indian politician (1898–1984)

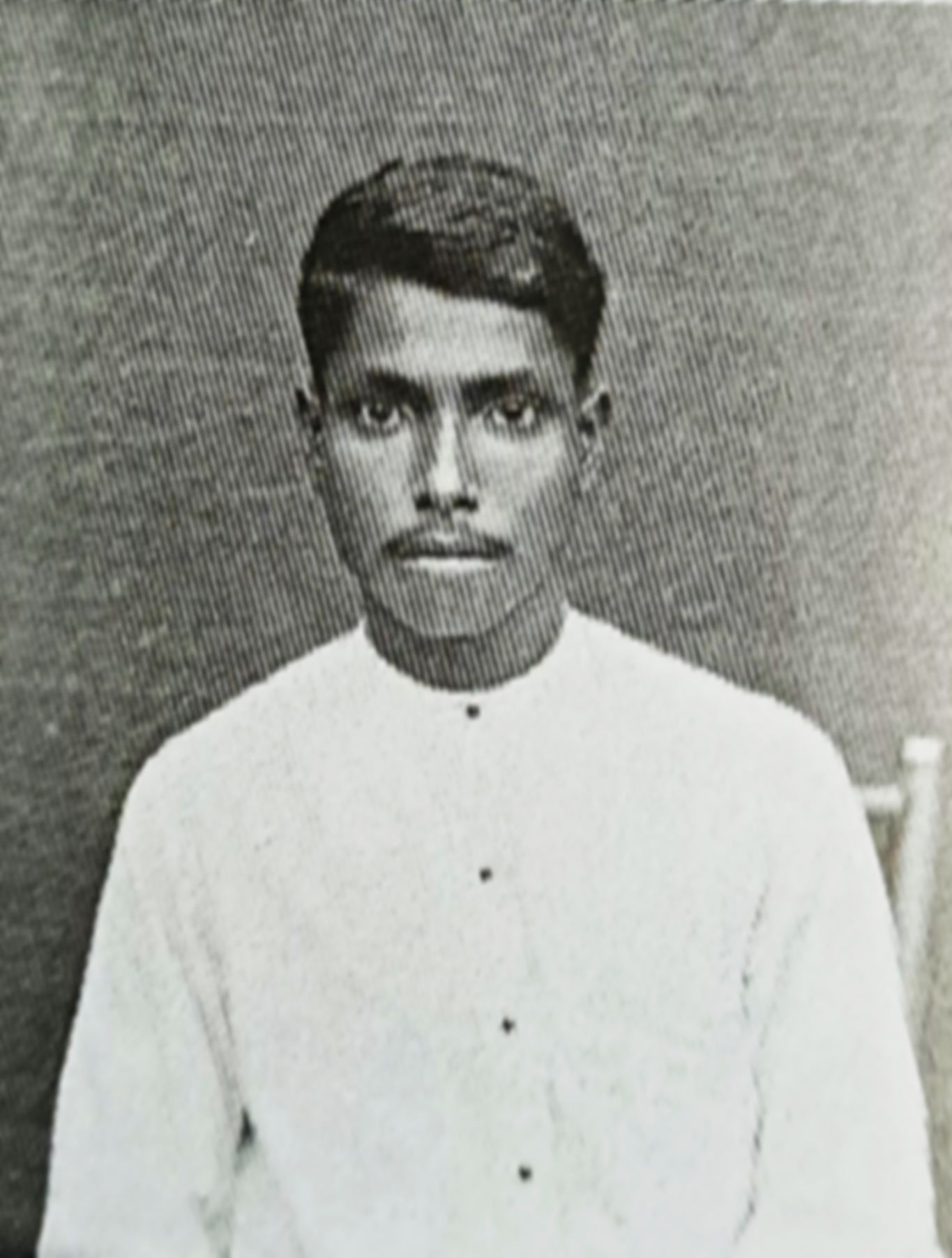

Member of Parliament, Lok Sabha
- In office 1952–1957
- Succeeded by: Pramathanath Banerjee
- In office 1962–1967
- Preceded by: Pramathanath Banerjee
- Succeeded by: Samar Guha
- Constituency: Contai, West Bengal

Member of Constituent Assembly of India
- In office 9 December 1946 – 24 January 1950

Personal details
- Born: 1 March 1898 Ramchak, Khejuri -II, Midnapore District, Bengal Presidency, British India
- Died: 1 December 1984 (aged 86)
- Party: Indian National Congress
- Spouse: Tarangini Das

Basanta Kumar Das (1 March 1898 – 1 December 1984) was an Indian Politician belonging to the Indian National Congress. He was elected to the Lok Sabha, the Lower house of Indian Parliament from Contai constituency, West Bengal in 1952 and 1962. He was earlier a member of the Constituent Assembly of India representing West Bengal.

== Early life ==
Basanta Kumar Das was born on 1 March 1898 in Ramchak village of Khejuri police station in Purba Medinipur district, British India in a Mahishya family to Indranarayan Das and Sudharani Debi. His family was mostly engaged in agriculture and farming. He passed his Matriculation examination from the esteemed Contai High School and then proceeded to the famed Presidency College, Calcutta by 1914 to study his undergraduate Science degree.

== Political career ==
While studying for his B.Sc at the Presidency College, Calcutta he had joined the Anushilan Samiti and by 1921 he had become a member of the Indian National Congress. For his association with the revolutionary societies and nationalist politicians he was arrested multiple times from 1916 to 1941. He also, actively participated in Non Cooperation movement, Civil disobedience and Quit India Movement. He closely worked with leaders such as Deshapran Birendranath Sasmal during the freedom struggle. He was the right-hand man of Deshapran Sasmal in organising the various independence activities in the areas of Purba Medinipur district.

After Independence, he along with Satish Chandra Samanta was chosen to be a member of the Constituent Assembly of India tasked with the drafting of the Indian constitution. He also led a delegation to the USSR relating to agriculture. He became a member of the Provincial Government from 1950 to 1952 and subsequently, the member of the First Lok Sabha and then the member of the West Bengal Legislative Council from 1958 to 1962.

== Personal life ==
He was married to Tarangini Debi, an independence activist and a leading figure among the women of Midnapore district during the Indian independence movement.

== Death ==
Basanta Kumar Das died on 1 December 1984 when he was 86 years, leaving his widowed wife and 5 children and his grandchildren. In his village, Ramchak his one storied Mud house still stands. He had established a school, Khejuri Adarsha Vidyapith in his native place Khejuri. One of his sons, Paresh Kanti Das was an MLA from Bangla Congress.
