= Arup Kumar Das (Kanthi politician) =

Indian politician

Cabinet Minister, Government of West Bengal
- Incumbent
- Assumed office 1 June 2026
- Governor: R. N. Ravi
- Chief Minister: Suvendu Adhikari

Member of the West Bengal Legislative Assembly
- Incumbent
- Assumed office 2 May 2021
- Preceded by: Chandrima Bhattacharya
- Constituency: Kanthi Dakshin

Personal details
- Born: October 23, 1957 (age 69)
- Party: Bharatiya Janata Party
- Education: M.Sc (Physics)
- Alma mater: Kalyani University
- Profession: Politician

Arup Kumar Das (23 October, 1957) is an Indian politician from West Bengal. He is a member Bharatiya Janata Party. In May 2021, he was elected as a member of the West Bengal Legislative Assembly from Kanthi Dakshin (constituency). He defeated Jyotirmoy Kar of All India Trinamool Congress by 10,293 votes in the 2021 West Bengal Assembly election.

== Political career ==
On 1 June 2026, he was sworn in as a Cabinet Minister of West Bengal, along with twelve other members.

=== Electoral performance ===
West Bengal Legislative Assembly
Year	Constituency	Party	Votes	%	Opponent	Party	Votes	%	Margin	Result
2021	Kanthi Dakshin	BJP	98,477	50.58	Jyotirmoy Kar	AITC	88,184	45.3	10,293	Won
2026	Kanthi Dakshin	BJP	1,18,219	55.54	Tarun Kumar Jana	AITC	86,747	40.76	31,472	Won

== See also ==
- 2026 West Bengal Legislative Assembly election
- List of chief ministers of West Bengal
- West Bengal Legislative Assembly
- 18th West Bengal Assembly
