= Hasirani Rath =

Member of the West Bengal Legislative Assembly

Member of West Bengal Legislative Assembly
- Incumbent
- Assumed office 28 October 2026
- Preceded by: Suvendu Adhikari
- Constituency: Nandigram

Personal details
- Born: 1966 (age 59–60)
- Party: Bharatiya Janata Party
- Children: Chandranath Rath
- Profession: Politician

Hasirani Rath is an Indian politician representing the Bharatiya Janata Party (BJP) who serves as the Member of the Legislative Assembly (MLA) for the Nandigram constituency in the West Bengal Legislative Assembly.

== Personal Life ==
She is the mother of late Chandranath Rath, who served as a close aide and personal assistant to West Bengal Chief Minister Suvendu Adhikari.
