= Nandigram Assembly constituency =

Nandigram
- Constituency No. 210 for the West Bengal Legislative Assembly
- Interactive Map Outlining Nandigram Assembly Constituency

Constituency details
- Country: India
- Region: East India
- State: West Bengal
- District: Purba Medinipur
- Lok Sabha constituency: Tamluk
- Established: 1951
- Total electors: 267,608
- Reservation: None

Member of Legislative Assembly
- 18th West Bengal Legislative Assembly
- Incumbent Hasirani Rath
- Party: BJP
- Alliance: NDA
- Elected year: 2026^

Nandigram Assembly constituency is an assembly constituency in Purba Medinipur district in the Indian state of West Bengal.

== Overview ==
As per orders of the Delimitation Commission, No. 210 Nandigram Assembly constituency is composed of the following: Nandigram I and Nandigram II community development blocks.

Nandigram Assembly constituency is part of No. 30 Tamluk Lok Sabha constituency.

== Members of the Legislative Assembly ==
=== 1967 to Present Nandigram ===
Election	Member	Party
1967	Bhupal Chandra Panda	Communist Party of India
1969	Bhupal Chandra Panda	Communist Party of India
1971	Bhupal Chandra Panda	Communist Party of India
1972	Bhupal Chandra Panda	Communist Party of India
1977	Prabir Chandra Jana	Janata Party
1982	Bhupal Chandra Panda	Communist Party of India
1987	Sakti Bal	Communist Party of India
1991	Sakti Bal	Communist Party of India
1996	Debi Sankar Panda	Indian National Congress
2001	Sheikh Mohammad Illias	Communist Party of India
2006	Sheikh Mohammad Illias	Communist Party of India
2009^	Phiroja Bibi	Trinamool Congress
2011	Phiroja Bibi	Trinamool Congress
2016	Suvendu Adhikari (Note: Adhikari resigned on 19 December 2020, 13 May 2026.)	Trinamool Congress
2021	Suvendu Adhikari	Bharatiya Janata Party
2026	Suvendu Adhikari	Bharatiya Janata Party
2026^	Hasirani Rath	Bharatiya Janata Party

- ^ denotes by-election

== Election results ==
Vote share of winning candidates
2026 (by-poll)	75.94%
2026	50.37%
2021	48.49%
2016	67.20%
2011	61.21%
2009 (by-poll)	58.28%
2006	48.7%
2001	51.50%
1996	49.20%
1991	47.90%
1987	52.60%
1982	54.30%
1977	46.60%

Victory margin of winning candidates
2026 (by-poll)	56.69%
2026	3.82%
2021	0.85%
2016	40.60%
2011	25.42%
2009 (by-poll)	23.43%
2006	3.40%
2001	6.10%
1996	0.10%
1991	3.40%
1987	6.40%
1982	11.30%
1977	23.80%

Voter turnout
2026 (by-poll)	80.89%
2026	94.59%
2021	88.53%
2016	86.97%
2011	87.93%
2009 (by-poll)	84.75%
2006	88.10%
2001	81.40%
1996	87.40%
1991	78.80%
1987	78.90%
1982	77.50%
1977	62.80%

=== 2026 by-election ===
2026 West Bengal Legislative Assembly by-election: Nandigram
Party	Candidate	Votes	%	±%
BJP	Hasirani Rath	164,427	75.94	▲25.57
INC	Milan Pradhan	41,674	19.25	▲18.94
CPI	Shanti Gopal Giri	5,779	2.67	▲1.48
AISF	Ali Mohammad Sabe Miraj Khan	1,607	0.74	▼0.01
DTC	Ehtesamul Haque	853	0.39	New entry
NOTA	None of the above	643	0.30	▼0.06
Majority		1,22,753	56.69	▲52.87
Turnout		2,16,515	80.89	▼13.70
BJP hold		Swing		

=== 2026 ===
2026 West Bengal Legislative Assembly election: Nandigram
Party	Candidate	Votes	%	±%
BJP	Suvendu Adhikari	127,301	50.37	▲1.88
AITC	Pabitra Kar	117,636	46.55	▼1.09
CPI	Shanti Gopal Giri	2,977	1.19	▼1.55
AISF	Ali Mohammad Sabe Miraj Khan	1,898	0.75	New
NOTA	None of the above	919	0.36	▼0.12
INC	Sekh Jariatul Hossain	794	0.31	−
Majority		9,665	3.82	▲2.97
Turnout		252,722	94.59	▲6.06
BJP hold		Swing		

=== 2021 ===
2021 West Bengal Legislative Assembly election: Nandigram
Party	Candidate	Votes	%	±%
BJP	Suvendu Adhikari	110,764	48.49	▲43.09
AITC	Mamata Banerjee	108,808	47.64	▼19.56
CPI(M)	Minakshi Mukherjee	6,267	2.74	▼23.96
NOTA	None of the above	1,090	0.48	
Majority		1,956	0.85	
Turnout		228,405	88.53	
BJP gain from AITC		Swing	31.33	

=== 2016 ===
2016 West Bengal Legislative Assembly election: Nandigram
Party	Candidate	Votes	%	±%
AITC	Suvendu Adhikari	134,623	67.20	
CPI	Abdul Kabir Sekh	53,393	26.70	
BJP	Bijon Kumar Das	10,713	5.40	
SUCI(C)	Bappaditya Nayak	828	0.40	
BNP	Ram Mohan Maity	717	0.40	
NOTA	None of the Above	1278	0.63	N/A
Majority		81,230	40.60	
Turnout		2,01,659	86.97	
AITC hold		Swing	7.32	

=== 2011 ===
2011 West Bengal Legislative Assembly election: Nandigram
Party	Candidate	Votes	%	±%
AITC	Firoja Bibi	103,300	61.21	+2.93
CPI	Paramananda Bharati	59,660	35.35	−4.00
BJP	Bijan Kumar Das	5,813	1.72	
PDCI	Mehedi Masud Sekh	2,898	1.69	
Majority		43,640	25.42	
Turnout		1,71,671	87.93	
AITC hold		Swing	3.47	

==== 2009 by-election ====
The bypoll to the Nandigram Occurred On 5 January 2009 Due To Resignation of the sitting MLA of CPI Sheikh Mohammad Illias.

Bye election, 2009: Nandigram
Party	Candidate	Votes	%	±%
AITC	Firoja Bibi	93,022	58.28	+12.41
CPI	Paramananda Bharati	53,473	39.35	−13.36
BJP	Bijan Kumar Das	9,813	1.72	
Majority		39,549	23.43	
Turnout		1,53,407	84.75	
AITC gain from CPI		Swing	25.77	

. Swing calculated on Congress+Trinamool Congress vote percentages taken together, as well as the CPI vote percentage, in 2006. Data for comparison not available for the 2009 by-election.

=== 2009 ===
In the bye election, necessitated by the resignation of the sitting MLA Sheikh Mohammad Illias on corruption charges, held in January 2009 in the background of Nandigram violence, Firoja Bibi of Trinamool Congress defeated Paramananda Bharati of CPI.

In the 2006 and 2001 state assembly elections, Sheikh Mohammad Illias of CPI won the 206 Nandigram assembly seat defeating his nearest rivals Sk. Supian of Trinamool Congress in 2006 and Sunil Baran Maiti of Trinamool Congress in 2001. Contests in most years were multi cornered but only winners and runners are being mentioned. Debisankar Panda of Congress defeated Sakti Bal of CPI in 1996. Sakti Bal of CPI defeated Debi Sankar Panda of Congress in 1991 and 1987. Bhupal Chandra Panda of CPI defeated Ramesh Chandra Gharai of Congress in 1982. Prabir Jana of Janata Party defeated Bhupal Chandra Panda of CPI in 1977.

=== 2006 ===
2006 West Bengal Legislative Assembly election: Nandigram
Party	Candidate	Votes	%	±%
CPI	Sheikh Mohammad Illias	93,022	48.7	
AITC	Sk Supian	53,473	45.3	
INC	Anwar Ali Sk	4943	3.5	
Majority		4,823	3.4	
Turnout		1,42,548	88.1	
CPI hold		Swing		

=== 2001 ===
2001 West Bengal Legislative Assembly election: Nandigram
Party	Candidate	Votes	%	±%
CPI	Sheikh Mohammad Illias	67,544	51.5	
AITC	Sunil Baran Maiti	59,540	45.4	
BJP	Mohit Kumar Tripathi	4,071	4,071	
Majority		8004	6.1	
Turnout		1,31,200	81.4	
CPI hold		Swing		

=== 1996 ===
1996 West Bengal Legislative Assembly election: Nandigram
Party	Candidate	Votes	%	±%
INC	Debisankar Panda	61,885	49.2	
CPI	Sakti Bal	61,747	49.1	
BJP	Joydeb Satpati	1,508	1.2	
Majority		138	0.1	
Turnout		1,28,160	87.4	
INC gain from CPI		Swing		

=== 1991 ===
1991 West Bengal Legislative Assembly election: Nandigram
Party	Candidate	Votes	%	±%
CPI	Sakti Bal	49,923	47.9	
INC	Debisankar Panda	46,253	44.3	
Independent	Sunil Maity	4,655	4.5	
BJP	Santosh Kumar Das	2,830	2.7	
Independent	Bhanani Prasad Das	672	0.6	
Majority		3,670	3.4	
Turnout		1,07,039	78.8	
CPI hold		Swing		

=== 1987 ===
1987 West Bengal Legislative Assembly election: Nandigram
Party	Candidate	Votes	%	±%
CPI	Sakti Bal	47,786	52.6	
INC	Debisankar Panda	41,914	46.2	
SUCI(C)	Pijush Kanti Bhunia	1,113	1.2	
Majority		5,872	6.4	
Turnout		91,985	78.9	
CPI hold		Swing		

=== 1982 ===
1982 West Bengal Legislative Assembly election: Nandigram
Party	Candidate	Votes	%	±%
CPI	Bhupal Chandra Panda	43,767	54.3	
INC	Ramesh Chandra Gharai	34,516	42.9	
JP	Prasanta Gayaen	2,057	2.6	
independence	Jagadish Chandra Das	208	0.3	
Majority		9,251	11.3	
Turnout		81,892	77.5	
CPI gain from JP		Swing		

=== 1977 ===
1977 West Bengal Legislative Assembly election: Nandigram
Party	Candidate	Votes	%	±%
JP	Prabir Jana	26,388	46.6	
CPI	Bhupal Chandra Panda	12,135	20.5	
CPI(M)	Rabindra Nath Maiti	10,744	18.2	
INC	Ramesh Chandra Gharai	8,932	15.1	
Independent	Sunil Baran Maiti	382	0.7	
Independent	Syed Asaf Ali	352	0.6	
Independent	Sitangsu Sekhar Das	205	0.4	
Majority		14,253	23.8	
Turnout		59,977	62.8	
JP gain from CPI		Swing		

=== 1972 ===
Bhupal Chandra Panda of CPI won in 1972, 1971, 1969 and 1967. Prior to that Nandigram had two seats, Nandigram North and Nandigram South.

=== 1962 ===
Prabir Chandra Jana of Congress won in 1962. Bhupal Chandra Panda of CPI won in 1957. In independent India's first election in 1951, Prabir Chandra Jana of Congress won the Nandigram South seat.

== See also ==
- 2021 Nandigram controversy
