= Sukhendu Maity =

Indian politician (c.1927–2019)

Member of the West Bengal Legislative Assembly
- In office 1987–1991
- Preceded by: Sisir Adhikari
- Succeeded by: Sailaja Kumar Das
- Constituency: Kanthi Dakshin

Personal details
- Born: c. 1927
- Died: 16 December 2019 (aged 92)
- Party: Communist Party of India

Sukhendu Maity (c. 1927 – 16 December 2019) was an Indian politician from West Bengal belonging to Communist Party of India. He was a legislator of the West Bengal Legislative Assembly.

== Biography ==
Maity was elected as a legislator of the West Bengal Legislative Assembly from Kanthi Dakshin in 1987.

Maity died on 16 December 2019 at the age of 92.
