= Sheikh Mohammad Illias =

Indian politician (born 1958)

Member of West Bengal Legislative Assembly
- In office 2001–2009
- Preceded by: Debi Sankar Panda
- Succeeded by: Firoja Bibi
- Constituency: Nandigram

Personal details
- Born: 10 March 1958 (age 68) Samsabad, Midnapore district, West Bengal, India
- Party: Communist Party of India
- Education: Sitananda College; Nandigram Brajamohan Tewary Sikshaniketan

Sheikh Mohammad Illias (born 10 March 1958) is an Indian politician belonging to the Communist Party of India. He was the MLA of Nandigram Assembly constituency in the West Bengal Legislative Assembly.

== Early life and education ==
Illias was born on 10 March 1958 to a Bengali family of Muslim Sheikhs in the village of Samsabad in Midnapore district, West Bengal. He is the son of Sheikh Abdul Jabbar. Illias studied at the Nandigram Braja Mohan Tewary High School and Sitananda College. He holds a Bachelor of Science degree.

== Career ==
Illias contested in the 2001 West Bengal Legislative Assembly election where he ran as an Indian National Congress candidate for Nandigram Assembly constituency, defeating Trinamool politician Sunil Baran Maiti. Illias was a member of the Standing Committee on Housing and Public Works. He was re-elected in the 2006 West Bengal Legislative Assembly election, defeating Maiti once again.
