= Dibyendu Adhikari =

Indian politician (born 1976)

Member of West Bengal Legislative Assembly
- Incumbent
- Assumed office 4 May 2026
- Preceded by: Tarun Maity
- Constituency: Egra
- In office 10 November 2009 – 19 May 2016
- Preceded by: Suvendu Adhikari
- Succeeded by: Chandrima Bhattacharya
- Constituency: Kanthi Dakshin

Member of Parliament, Lok Sabha
- In office 23 November 2016 – 4 June 2024
- Preceded by: Suvendu Adhikari
- Succeeded by: Abhijit Gangopadhyay
- Constituency: Tamluk, West Bengal

Personal details
- Born: 24 December 1976 (age 49) Contai, West Bengal, India
- Party: Bharatiya Janata Party (2024–present)
- Other political affiliations: Trinamool Congress (until 2024)
- Parent: Sisir Adhikari (father)
- Relatives: Suvendu Adhikari (brother); Soumendu Adhikari (brother)
- Education: Contai Prabhat Kumar College (NSOU)
- Profession: Politician

Dibyendu Adhikari (born 24 December 1976) is an Indian politician from the state of West Bengal. He was voted into the West Bengal Legislative Assembly as an MLA from Egra Assembly constituency in the 2026 West Bengal Legislative Assembly election as a member of the Bharatiya Janata Party.

== Political career ==
Earlier, he was elected to Lok Sabha from Tamluk in 2019 as a member of the Trinamool Congress.

Adhikari was a Member of Legislative Assembly (MLA) in West Bengal from Dakhin Kanthi constituency from 2009 to 2016. In 2016, he was elected to Lok Sabha from Tamluk parliamentary constituency of West Bengal on an AITC ticket in a by-election when the seat fell vacant due to the resignation of the sitting MP and his elder brother Suvendu Adhikari, who was elected to the West Bengal Legislative Assembly. He is also councillor of Contai Municipality.

== Family and education ==
Adhikari's father Sisir and brothers Suvendu (currently Chief Minister of West Bengal) and Soumendu were also elected to the Lok Sabha or West Bengal Legislative Assembly.

He has completed his B.A. (Hons) from Contai Prabhat Kumar College (NSOU) in 1998.
