= Phulrenu Guha =

Indian politician

PB Phulrenu Guha
- ফুলরেণু গুহ
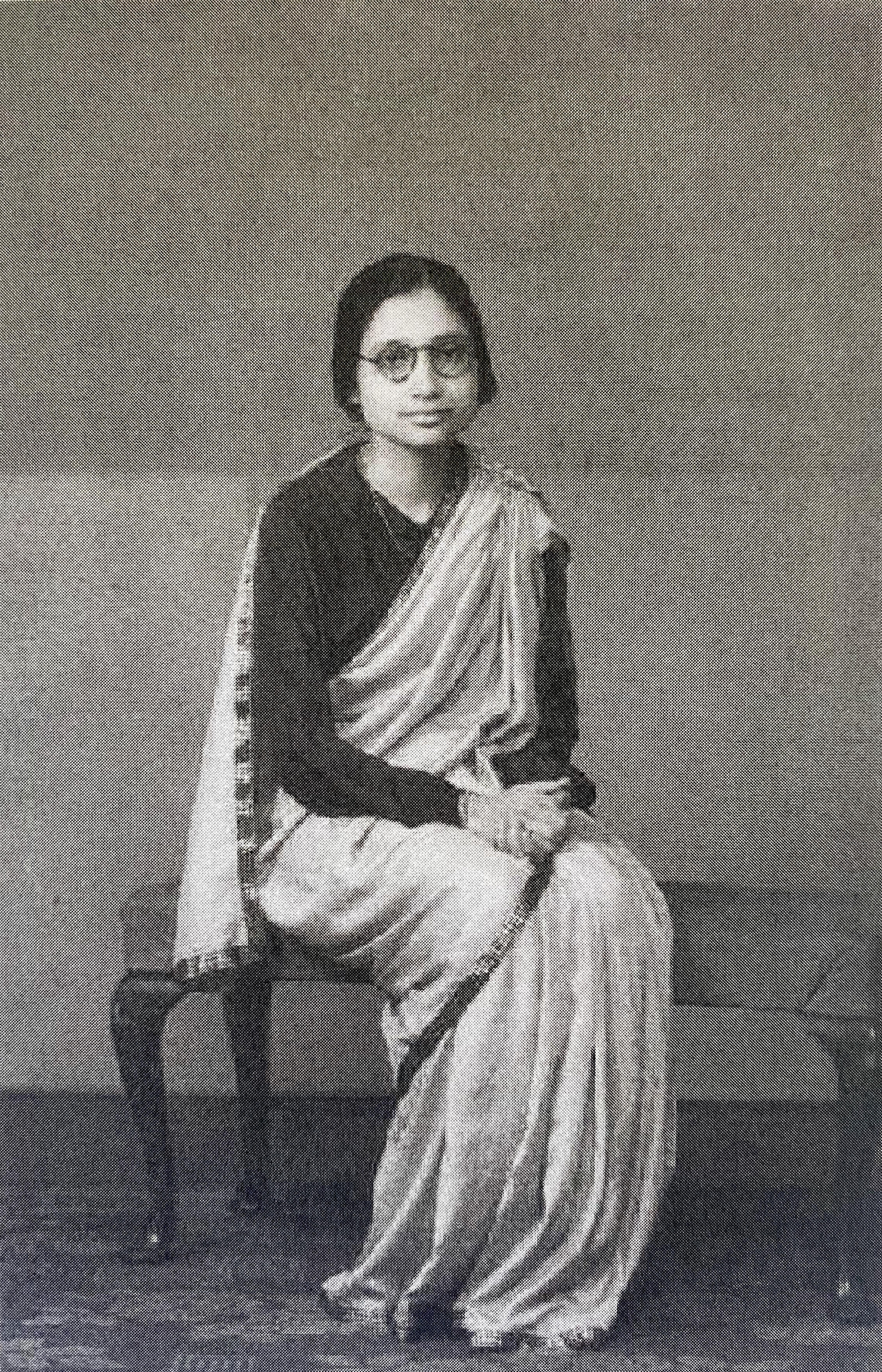
- Phulrenu Guha in Paris, 1937

Member of Parliament, Lok Sabha
- In office 1984–1989
- Preceded by: Sudhir Kumar Giri
- Succeeded by: Sudhir Kumar Giri
- Constituency: Contai, West Bengal

Union Minister of State for Ministry of Social Welfare
- In office 1967–1969

Member of Parliament, Rajya Sabha
- In office 1964–1970
- Constituency: West Bengal

Personal details
- Born: Phulrenu Dutta; 13 August 1912 Calcutta, British India
- Died: 28 July 2006 (aged 93) Calcutta, India
- Party: Indian National Congress
- Other political affiliations: Jugantar Revolutionary Party
- Spouse: Dr. Biresh Chandra Guha
- Relatives: Sreyash Sarkar, Sumitra Guha, Uma Bose
- Education: University of Calcutta(M.A.), University of Paris(Ph.D)
- Awards: Padma Bhushan
- Writing career
- Notable works: Women and Society (collection of essays)
- Pronunciation

Dr Phulrenu Guha (née Dutta, Bengali:ফুলরেণু গুহ; born 13 August 1911) was an Indian activist, educationist and politician, belonging to the Indian National Congress. She was a member of the Rajya Sabha the Upper house of Indian Parliament from April 1964 to April 1970 from West Bengal. She was the Minister for Social Welfare in the Indira Gandhi Ministry from 1967 to 1969. She was elected to the Lok Sabha the Lower house of Indian Parliament from Contai constituency, West Bengal in 1984. She was awarded the Padma Bhushan in 1977.

== Early years in Bengal ==
Guha was born on 13 August 1911 in Calcutta to Deputy Magistrate Surendranath Dutta and social activist Abalabala Dutta. Having been nurtured in a progressive family, she inherited the legacy of social service and standing up for justice, from her parents. Guha writes in her memoirs, Elo Melo Mone Elo, that her father had decided to resign from service protesting against the government's decision to partition Bengal when Ashwini Kumar Dutta, a revered social reformer in Barisal finally persuaded him not to do so. Nevertheless, this defiant nature of his, made him unlikeable amongst various British government officials and the outcome was that he needed to acknowledge troublesome postings for many occasions. Her mother Abalabala too, had a noteworthy impact on Guha, in moulding her by instilling a zeal of patriotism and myriad sensibilities in her.

Guha studied in Gokhale Memorial Girls’ School and Brahmo Girls’ School at Calcutta for a few years, but passed her matriculation exam from a school in Assam Following that, she passed her B.A from Brajomohan College in Barisal and subsequently her M.A in Bengali Literature and philosophy from Calcutta University under the mentorship of Sarvapalli Radhakrishnan.

Her years in Barishal drew her towards the Yugantar Party, committed to nationalism and after having joined the Party, she twice went underground. This is where she met her future husband, Dr.Biresh Chandra Guha, who had joined the Jugantar Party even younger, and who had completed his M.Sc. in organic chemistry in 1925 and begun working under the famed chemist-entrepreneur Prafulla Chandra Ray. Afterwards, deeply worried about her growing tendency towards active engagement in politics, her parents sent her to the School of Oriental Studies, London for graduate studies in political science.

== Life abroad ==
While in London, Guha did not lose touch from the socio-political landscape in India and kept herself updated by regularly visiting Gower Street which housed letters and newspapers arriving from India. From London, she attended the Prague Conference of the Federation of Indian and Ceylonese students, having taken a keen interest in Communism and met Benjamin Francis Bradley, the then Communist leader of Great Britain. In 1928, while Biresh left for England, Guha joined the Sorbonne in Paris. Biresh was working with Sir Jack Drummond and Sir Frederick Gowland Hopkins in London and Cambridge and helping to discover vitamins.

After a year in London, Guha left for Paris, as according to her, the climate of London did not suit her. In Paris, she became a member of the executive committee of the Indian Students Association and completed her PhD from the Sorbonne. Her thesis titled, La société bengalie au XVIe siècle, completed at Université de Paris, Faculté des lettres et sciences humaines, is preserved at the rare books section within the research library wing of the François Mitterrand site of Bibliothèque Nationale de France.

Guha along with Lajwanti Rama Krishna, whose Sorbonne thesis Les Sikhs: origine et développement de la communauté jusqu’à nos jours (1469–1930) was published in 1933, were among the first Indian women to earn a doctorate in France and one of the earliest Asian women to pursue doctoral studies in Europe, thereby pioneering advanced academic research for women in India.

She arrived in Calcutta in June 1938 and was reported to have brought Rs.3000 from the Communist Party of Great Britain for the Communists working in India.

== Social welfare, activism and foray into politics ==
Having arrived in Calcutta, India, Guha took to teaching in a women's college and took up a variety of projects including working for illiteracy eradication classes in the Khidderpore dock area, where close contact and a view into the lives of prostitutes, proved to be fruitful for her for setting up her organisation for destitute women, later on. Initially a non-believer in Gandhian philosophy, she was drawn to Gandhi's ideas of non-violence, while working for the anti-war movement during the Second World War and this belief prompted her to join the Indian National Congress.

Speaking of her political ideologies, the scholar S. Gooptu argued:

She [Phulrenu] was never constricted by indoctrination to a particular strand of politics in her initial years. She could follow an ideology because she believed in it, could pursue it sincerely and also reject it and change to another when it failed to satisfy her.

By early 1940s, the Guhas were gotten up to speed in the Non-Cooperation Movement, and Biresh was imprisoned, leaving Guha, resolute, to battle alone. She was a piece of the push to assuage the upset during the Bengal Famine in 1941–43 and she additionally endeavoured to reestablish shared congruity at Noakhali.

From 1943 to 1944, she was Secretary of the Women's Section of the Azad Hind Relief Committee. Like fellow activist Kamaladevi Chattopadhyay, she comprehended that the primary need after Partition must be the recovery and aid of the dislodged, particularly women and kids. After Independence, Guha devoted herself completely to nation-building.

She served different State and Central Government associations in various limits. She was Chairperson of the Task Force on Child Welfare Committee of Planning Commission, Government of India, from 1971 to 1972 and of the Committee on Status of Women in India from 1972 to 1975. She was likewise leader of the Indian Council of Child Welfare from 1970 to 1973.She was a Member of the Lok Sabha from 1964 to 1970. She filled in as Minister of State for Social Welfare from March 1967 to February 1969 and Law from February 1969 to June 1970.

In 1977, she was awarded India's third-highest civilian award, the Padma Bhushan.

== Contribution to women empowerment ==
Guha's undertaking to make women financially independent through learning handiwork aptitudes proved to be fruitful when she established Karma Kutir, an art and crafts organisation in Kolkata. About its beginning, Guha reviewed:

Probably in 1960, Kamaladevi Chattopadhyay became the Chairperson of the All India Handicraft Board. One day, I told her that just like the handicraft training centres in Bombay and Hyderabad, why can’t we have a centre in Eastern India with the help of Handicraft Board. Almost as if to throw a challenge to me she said, “Yes, it can certainly come up in Calcutta, if you take responsibility.” As a result, a big responsibility came upon me.

Apart from Phulrenu other founder members were Pratibha Bose, Sudha Sen, Swarnarenu Ghosh, Panna Ray, Hena Sarkar and Amita Das. Phulrenu recalled that when the Government of India started providing grants then, women from Sri Lanka, Nigeria and Mauritius also started participating in the training courses provided by Karma Kutir, alongside local women.

Restoring and reestablishing exploited women to a standard of living, and engaging them with establishments that would provide with the opportunities, were the essential objectives of Guha's life. During the 1960s, she set up Association for Social Health and Moral Hygiene in Naktala, Calcutta. The foundation had a humble start in a room at the workplace of the Social government assistance board at Free School Street, Calcutta. Guha recognized the commitment of her two collaborators Amita Das Gupta and Dr Maitreyi Basu behind the development of the foundation. From 1965 onwards, this association began working as the West Bengal section of the Association for Social Health in India (ASHI).

An adherent of equal rights for women, Guha was charmed when the Hindu Marriage Act was passed in 1955 giving equivalent rights to women for separation to end a marriage. In any case, Phulrenu called attention to the fact that specific proviso in the law should have been dealt with. She called attention to the fact that the Hindu Marriage Code had given a privilege to either gathering to request the disintegration of a marriage. She spoke at the Rajya Sabha:

...there are cases where the husband obtained a decree but never filed a petition for divorce even after two years. In such a case the wife has no right, according to law, to file a petition for divorce. It is a very peculiar and uneasy position, particularly for a woman.

She additionally noticed that the Act, in its current structure permitted to request for legal partition on some particular grounds as brutality, infidelity or incurable illnesses, for example, experiencing leprosy and venereal infections or if the life partner was of the unsound psyche. However, such charges must be validated, and meanwhile, counter-arguments could likewise come at the court. In the process, it was the ladies who endured most. Speaking of this, she notes:

When something is said against her, whether it is right or wrong, people usually believe it and she suffers throughout her life because of that stigma.

== Personal life ==
She was married to the noted Indian biochemist Dr Biresh Chandra Guha on 17 July 1945, numerous years after they had initially met. Guha died 95 years old in 2006, in a maturity home she had established herself, and furthermore openly gave her assets to Calcutta University to set up the B.C. Guha Center for Genetic Engineering and Biotechnology.
