= Prasanta Pradhan =

Indian politician

Member of parliament, Lok Sabha
- In office 2004–2009
- Preceded by: Nitish Sengupta
- Succeeded by: Sisir Adhikari
- Constituency: Contai

Personal details
- Born: 14 December 1939 (age 86) Purba Medinipur, West Bengal
- Party: CPI(M)
- Spouse: Rina Pradhan
- Children: 3 sons
- As of 17 September, 2006

Prasanta Pradhan (born 14 December 1939) is an Indian politician for the Contai (Lok Sabha constituency) in West Bengal.
