= Nandigram Brajamohan Tewary Sikshaniketan =

High school in West Bengal, India

Nandigram BMT Sikshaniketan
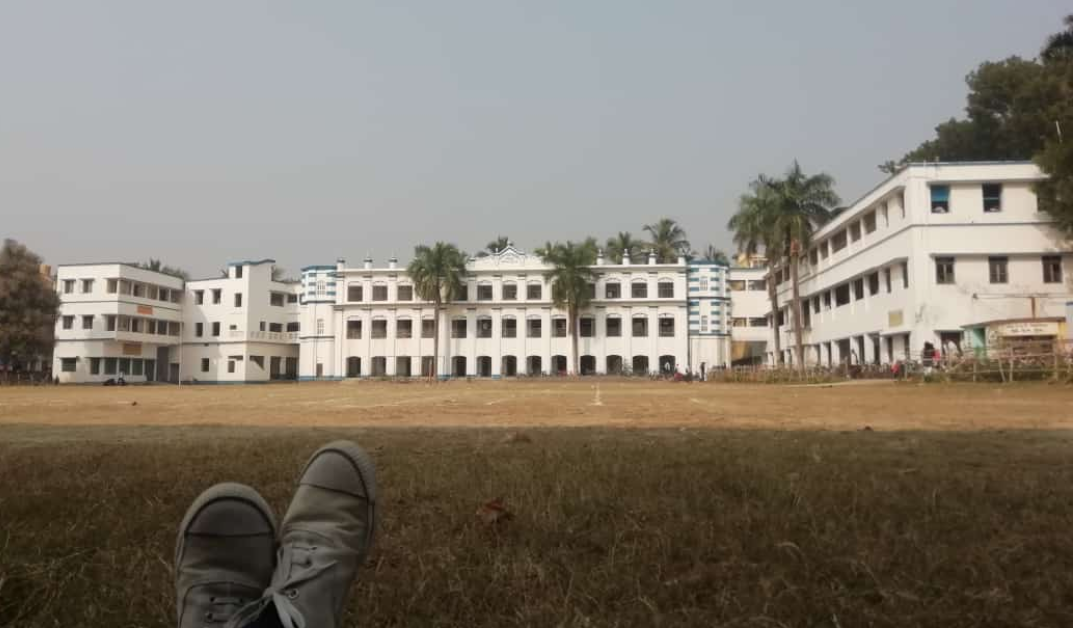

Location
- Nandigram, Purba Medinipur, West Bengal; 721631
- Coordinates: 22°00′42″N 87°58′33″E

Information
- Type: Higher Secondary School
- Motto: তমসো মা জ্যোতির্গময় (Lead me from darkness to light)
- Established: 1912; 114 years ago
- Status: Active
- School board: WBBSE & WBCHSE & WBSCTE
- Headmaster: Ranjit Kumar Shasmal
- Teaching staff: 25
- Employees: 8
- Gender: Boys & Girls
- Age: 10 to 18
- Student to teacher ratio: 100:1
- Language: Bengali
- Campus type: Rural
- Colors: White & Blue
- Website: nandigrambmtsikshaniketan.in

Nandigram Brajamohan Tewary Sikshaniketan, also known as Nandigram BMT Sikshaniketan, is a government-sponsored higher secondary school located in Nandigram, Purba Medinipur, West Bengal, India. The school was established in the year 1912.

The school is affiliated to the West Bengal Board of Secondary Education for education till 10th standard, West Bengal Council of Higher Secondary Education for 11th & 12th standard and West Bengal State Council of Technical & Vocational Education and Skill Development for vocational education.

== History ==
There are two schools in this area, Nandigram BMT Sikshaniketan exclusively for boys till 10th standard and co-ed for 11th and 12th standard and Nandigram BM Girls High School exclusively for girls till 10th standard. But in the year 2015, the High Court of Calcutta passed an order stated that "Nandigram Brajamohan Tewary Sikshaniketan shall be entitled to admit a maximum of 100 students with effect from the current session, if there are willing girl students, not yet admitted, who would like to take admission. It shall, however, be ensured that no student of Nandigram Brajamohan Girls' High School is admitted there on transfer."

== Establishment and development ==
Recognizing the deplorable state of education in the area, in 1912, some expatriates and local education devotees endeavoured to establish a high school in the town. Through their relentless efforts, the first seed of today's BMT Sikshaniketan was sown in those very humble beginnings. This noble endeavor was brought to fruition by the generous land and financial contributions of kind-hearted individuals like Raj Bahadur of Mahishadal, Sri Brajamohan Tewary, and Sri Fakirchand Das. Since then, the school has proudly continued to provide education, overcoming various adversities and obstacles.

== Hostel facility ==
Nandigram BMT OBC Central Hostel is a residential facility for female students at Nandigram BMT Sikshaniketan. Established to support female education, the hostel offers accommodation to around 100 students.

== Notable Alumni ==
- Sheikh Mohammad Illias (born 1958), member of the Legislative Assembly
- Bhupal Chandra Panda
