= Tarun Kumar Maity =

Indian politician (born 1967)

Member of the West Bengal Legislative Assembly
- In office 2 May 2021 – 5 May 2026
- Preceded by: Samares Das
- Succeeded by: Dibyendu Adhikari
- Constituency: Egra

Personal details
- Born: 11 October 1967 (age 59)
- Party: Trinamool Congress
- Spouse: Kakali Bishnu Maity
- Profession: Teacher, Politician

Tarun Kumar Maity is an Indian politician member of Trinamool Congress. He is an MLA, elected from the Egra constituency in the 2021 West Bengal Legislative Assembly election.
