= Biresh Chandra Guha =

Indian biochemist

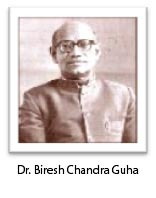
- Born: 8 June 1904; Mymensingh, Bengal Presidency, British India
- Died: 20 March 1962 (aged 57); Lucknow, Uttar Pradesh, India
- Education: St. Xavier's College, Kolkata; University of Calcutta
- Spouse: Phulrenu Guha
- Scientific career
- Fields: biochemistry

Biresh Chandra Guha (8 June 1904 – 20 March 1962) was an Indian biochemist who is widely known as the father of modern biochemistry in India. He helped make biochemistry a separate subject in India and made important contributions to research on vitamins, food science, and nutrition.

== Early life and education ==
Guha was born on 8 June 1904 in Mymensingh, in present-day Bangladesh. His ancestral home was in Banaripara, Barisal Division. From a young age, he was influenced by the Swadeshi Movement during India’s fight for independence. His maternal uncle, Aswini Kumar Dutta, was an educationist and social reformer who had a strong impact on him.

He attended Brajamohon School in Barisal until 1917, then moved to Calcutta in 1918 and enrolled at Srikrishna Pathsala, passing his Matriculation Examination in 1919. In 1921, he passed the Intermediate Science (I.Sc.) Examination, ranking second in order of merit. He then joined Presidency College for Chemistry Honours but was imprisoned and expelled for attending a banned political meeting during the Non-Cooperation Movement.

Guha then joined St. Xavier’s College, where he completed his B.Sc. degree with honours in Chemistry in 1923, standing first class first. He continued at the University of Calcutta and stood first in his M.Sc. examination in 1925. After a brief period of post-M.Sc. research under Acharya Prafulla Chandra Ray at the University College of Science, he received the Tata Endowment Fellowship in 1926 to pursue higher studies in the United Kingdom.

== Career and research ==
In 1926, Guha went to England for higher studies. He spent five years doing research on B vitamins at University College London under Jack Drummond and at the University of Cambridge under Sir Frederick Gowland Hopkins, a Nobel Laureate. He earned both a Ph.D. and a D.Sc. from the University of London.

Guha returned to India in 1932 and joined Bengal Chemicals and Pharmaceuticals, where he worked on vitamin research. In 1936, he was appointed Head of the Biochemistry Department at the University of Calcutta. He helped introduce a post-graduate course in biochemistry at the university.

Guha’s research mainly focused on the biosynthesis of vitamin C (ascorbic acid) and the study of B vitamins. His work showed how biochemistry connects genetics and the evolution of life. He also researched waste utilisation and management to benefit India’s economy and studied the nutritional importance of proteins and vitamins at different life stages. His comparative studies of marine and freshwater fish added to the understanding of their nutritional value.

=== Administrative roles ===
During the Bengal famine of 1943, Guha developed low-cost protein foods and digests to help address widespread hunger and malnutrition.

In 1944, he was appointed Chief Technical Adviser to the Ministry of Food, Government of India. There, he organised a country-wide nutrition survey and set up a technical wing for food inspection, analysis, and standardisation. It was during this time that he proposed the idea for a national Food Technological Research Institute, which later took shape when the Council of Scientific and Industrial Research established the Central Food Technological Research Institute in Mysore.

Guha also represented India as counsellor in agricultural sciences at UNESCO in Paris while working in the Food Department. In 1948, he joined the Damodar Valley Corporation as a member representing West Bengal. After nearly a decade in government and administrative roles, Guha returned fully to academic work in 1953 when he resumed his university professorship in Calcutta.

== Recognition ==
Guha was elected a Fellow of the National Institute of Sciences of India in 1941.

== Personal life ==
In 1944, at the age of 41, Guha married Phulrenu Guha, an Indian social activist, educationist, and politician who later served as a member of the Rajya Sabha and was awarded the Padma Bhushan.

Guha died in Lucknow on 20 March 1962 while on a holiday trip.

== Legacy ==
After his death, Phulrenu Guha donated their house in Ballygunge, Kolkata, to the University of Calcutta for research in biochemistry. The facility is now known as the Guha Centre for Genetic Engineering and Biotechnology. In his memory, the Indian National Science Academy established the Biresh Chandra Guha Memorial Lecture.
