= Egra Assembly constituency =

Egra
- Constituency No. 218 for the West Bengal Legislative Assembly
- Interactive Map Outlining Egra Assembly Constituency

Constituency details
- Country: India
- Region: East India
- State: West Bengal
- District: Purba Medinipur
- Lok Sabha constituency: Medinipur
- Established: 1957
- Total electors: 219,092
- Reservation: None

Member of Legislative Assembly
- 18th West Bengal Legislative Assembly
- Incumbent Dibyendu Adhikari
- Party: BJP
- Alliance: NDA
- Elected year: 2026

Egra Assembly constituency is an assembly constituency in Purba Medinipur district in the Indian state of West Bengal.

== Overview ==
As per orders of the Delimitation Commission No. 218, Egra Assembly constituency is composed of the following: Egra municipality, Egra I community development blocks, and Basudevpur, Deshbandhu, Dubda, Manjusree, Paniparul, Sarbaday and Bibekananda gram panchayats of Egra II community development block.

Egra Assembly constituency is part of No. 34 Medinipur (Lok Sabha constituency). It was earlier part of Contai (Lok Sabha constituency).

== Members of the Legislative Assembly ==
Year	Name	Party
1957	Bhuban Chandra Kar Mahapatra	Praja Socialist Party
1962	Hrishikesh Chakraborty	Indian National Congress
1967	Bibhuti Pahari	Praja Socialist Party
1969	Bibhuti Pahari	Praja Socialist Party
1971	Prabodh Chandra Sinha	Praja Socialist Party
1972	Khan Samsul Alam	Indian National Congress
1977	Prabodh Chandra Sinha	Janata Party
1982	Prabodh Chandra Sinha	Communist Party of India
1987	Prabodh Chandra Sinha	Communist Party of India
1991	Prabodh Chandra Sinha	Communist Party of India
1996	Prabodh Chandra Sinha	Communist Party of India
2001	Prabodh Chandra Sinha	Independent politician
2006	Sisir Adhikari	Trinamool Congress
2009^	Samares Das	Trinamool Congress
2011	Samares Das	Trinamool Congress
2016	Samares Das	Trinamool Congress
2021	Tarun Kumar Maity	Trinamool Congress
2026	Dibyendu Adhikari	Bharatiya Janata Party

^By election

== Election Results ==
=== 2026 ===
2026 West Bengal Legislative Assembly election: Egra
Party	Candidate	Votes	%	±%
BJP	Dibyendu Adhikari	142,670	52.96	+8.41
AITC	Tarun Kumar Maity	116,978	43.43	−8.79
CPI(M)	Subarata Panda	5,736	2.13	
NOTA	None of the above	722	0.27	−0.31
Majority		25,692	9.53	+1.86
Turnout		269,373	92.28	+7.67
BJP gain from AITC		Swing		

=== 2021 ===
2021 West Bengal Legislative Assembly election: Egra
Party	Candidate	Votes	%	±%
AITC	Tarun Kumar Maity	125,763	52.22	
BJP	Arup Das	107,272	44.55	
INC	Manas Kumar Kar Mahapatra	5,086	2.11	
NOTA	None of the above	1,393	0.58	
Majority		18,491	7.67	
Turnout		240,817	84.61	
AITC hold		Swing		

=== 2016 ===
West Bengal assembly elections, 2016: Egra
Party	Candidate	Votes	%	±%
AITC	Samares Das	113,334	52.00	
DSP(PC)	Shaikh Mahmud Hossain	87,378	40.10	
BJP	Minati Sur	13,002	6.00	
Socialist Unity Centre Of India (Communist)	Jagadis Sau	2,340	1.10	
Samajwadi Party	Gourishankar Raymahapatra	1,829	0.80	
Turnout		2,17,883	(84.7%)	
AITC hold		Swing		

=== 2011 ===
West Bengal assembly elections, 2011: Egra
Party	Candidate	Votes	%	±%
AITC	Samares Das	99,178	51.57	+1.46#
DSP(PC)	Hrisikesh Paria	83,225	43.27	−3.61
BJP	Minati Sur	6,358	3.31	
Independent	Durga Pada Mishra	3,565		
Turnout		192,326	87.78	
AITC hold		Swing	5.07#	

.# Swing calculated on Congress+Trinamool Congress vote percentages taken together in 2006. 2009 by election not taken into consideration because of lack of sufficient data.

=== 2009 bypoll ===
The bypoll to Egra occurred due to resignation of the sitting MLA of AITC, Sisir Adhikari, who was elected to the Indian Parliament from Kanthi on 16 May 2009.

West Bengal state assembly by election, 2009: Egra constituency
Party	Candidate	Votes	%	±%
AITC	Samares Das	72,403		
DSP(PC)	Prabodh Chandra Sinha	66,453		
Turnout		138,856	86.46	
AITC hold		Swing		

.# Swing calculated on Congress+Trinamool Congress vote percentages taken together, as well as the DSP vote percentage, in 2006. Data for comparison not available for the 2009 by-election.

=== 2009 ===
In the 2009 byelection, necessitated by the election of the sitting MLA Sisir Adhikari to Parliament from Kanthi (Lok Sabha constituency), Samaresh Das of Trinamool Congress defeated Prabodh Chandra Sinha.

In the 2006 state assembly elections, Sisir Adhikari of Trinamool Congress won the 213 Egra assembly seat defeating his nearest rival Prabodh Chandra Sinha of DSP (PC). Contests in most years were multi cornered but only winners and runners are being mentioned. Prabodh Chandra Sinha, contesting as Independent or on CPI(M) symbol, won the Egra seat between 1982 and 2001, defeating Tapan Kanti Kar of Trinamool Congress in 2001, Sohan Jyoti Maiti of Congress in 1996, Tapan Kanti Kar of Congress in 1991, Kshitindra Mohan Sahoo of Congress in 1987 and Khan Samsul Alam of Congress in 1982. Prabodh Chandra Sinha representing Janata Party defeated Anandi Nandan Das of CPI(M) in 1977.

=== 2006 ===
West Bengal assembly elections, 2006: Egra
Party	Candidate	Votes	%	±%
AITC	Sisir Kumar Adhikari	67,786	48.00	
DSP(PC)	Prabodh Chandra Sinha	66,196	46.90	
INC	Samsul Alam Khan	2,964		
Independent	Jagadish Sau	2,921		
SPI	Ratan Sheet	1,334		
Majority		1,590	(1.1%)	
Turnout		1,41,278	(89.8%)	
AITC gain from DSP(PC)		Swing		

.# Swing calculated on BJP+Trinamool Congress vote percentages taken together in 2006.

=== 1972 ===
Khan Samsul Alam of Congress won in 1972. Prabodh Chandra Sinha of PSP won in 1971. Bibhuti Pahari of PSP won in 1969 and 1967. Hrishikesh Chakraborty of Congress won in 1962. Bhuban Chandra Kar Mahapatra won in 1957.
