= Kanthi Dakshin Assembly constituency =

Kanthi Dakshin
- Constituency No. 216 for the West Bengal Legislative Assembly
- Interactive Map Outlining Kanthi Dakshin Assembly Constituency

Constituency details
- Country: India
- Region: East India
- State: West Bengal
- District: East Medinipur
- Lok Sabha constituency: Kanthi
- Established: 1951
- Total electors: 2,24,657
- Reservation: None

Member of Legislative Assembly
- 18th West Bengal Legislative Assembly
- Incumbent Arup Kumar Das; Minister of Irrigation and Waterways, Government of West Bengal
- Party: BJP
- Alliance: NDA
- Elected year: 2026

Kanthi Dakshin Assembly constituency is an assembly constituency in East Medinipur district in the Indian state of West Bengal.

== Overview ==
As per orders of the Delimitation Commission, No. 216 Kanthi Dakshin Assembly constituency is composed of the following: Contai municipality, Contai I community development block, and Durmuth and Kusumpur gram panchayats of Contai III community development block.

Kanthi Dakshin Assembly constituency is part of No. 31 Kanthi Lok Sabha constituency.

== Members of the Legislative Assembly ==
Year	Name	Party
Contai South
1952	Natendra Nath Das	Kisan Mazdoor Praja Party
1957	Rashbehari Pal	Indian National Congress
1962	Sudhir Chandra Das	Praja Socialist Party
1967	Sudhir Chandra Das	Praja Socialist Party
1969	Sudhir Chandra Das	Praja Socialist Party
1971	Sudhir Chandra Das	Praja Socialist Party
1972	Sudhir Chandra Das	Praja Socialist Party
1977	Satyabrata Maity	Janata Party
1982	Sisir Adhikari	Indian National Congress
1987	Sukhendu Maity	Communist Party of India
1991	Sailaja Kumar Das	Indian National Congress
1996	Sailaja Kumar Das	Indian National Congress
2001	Sisir Adhikari	Trinamool Congress
2006	Suvendu Adhikari	Trinamool Congress
2009^	Dibyendu Adhikari	Trinamool Congress
Major boundary changes; constituency renamed as Kanthi Dakshin
2011	Dibyendu Adhikari	Trinamool Congress
2016	Dibyendu Adhikari	Trinamool Congress
2017^	Chandrima Bhattacharya	Trinamool Congress
2021	Arup Kumar Das	Bharatiya Janata Party
2026	Arup Kumar Das	Bharatiya Janata Party

== Election results ==
=== 2026 ===
2026 West Bengal Legislative Assembly election: Kanthi Dakshin
Party	Candidate	Votes	%	±%
BJP	Arup Kumar Das	118,219	55.54	▲4.96
AITC	Tarun Kumar Jana	86,747	40.76	▼4.54
CPI	Teheran Hossain	3,868	1.82	▼1.27
NOTA	None of the above	1,288	0.61	▲0.16
Majority		31,472	14.78	▲9.5
Turnout		212,835	93.18	▲6.52
BJP hold		Swing		

=== 2021 ===
2021 West Bengal Legislative Assembly election: Kanthi Dakshin
Party	Candidate	Votes	%	±%
BJP	Arup Kumar Das	98,477	50.58	▲19.61
AITC	Jyotirmoy Kar	88,184	45.30	▼10.58
CPI	Anurup Panda	6,014	3.09	▼7.12
NOTA	None of the above	870	0.45	▼0.28
Majority		10,293	5.28	▼19.64
Turnout		194,681	86.66	▲4.65
BJP gain from AITC		Swing		

=== 2017 bypoll ===
The bye election was necessitated by the resignation of the sitting MLA, Dibyendu Adhikari, as he was elected as MP in the Indian Parliament from Tamluk Lok Sabha Constituency on 19 November 2016.

2017 by-election: Kanthi Dakshin
Party	Candidate	Votes	%	±%
AITC	Chandrima Bhattacharya	95,369	55.89	+2.17
BJP	Sourindra Mohan Jana	52,843	30.97	+22.21
CPI	Uttam Pradhan	17,423	10.21	−24.01
INC	Naba Kumar Nanda	2,270	1.33	N/A
SUCI(C)	Shrabani Pahari	1,476	0.87	+0.29
NOTA	None of the above	1,241	0.73	−0.60
Majority		42,526	24.92	+5.42
Turnout		1,70,622	82.01	−2.90
Registered electors		2,08,028		
AITC hold		Swing		

=== 2016 ===
2016 West Bengal Legislative Assembly election: Kanthi Dakshin
Party	Candidate	Votes	%	±%
AITC	Dibyendu Adhikari	93,359	53.72	
CPI	Uttam Pradhan	59,469	34.22	
BJP	Kamalesh Mishra	15,223	8.76	
WPI	Sridhar Dash	1,038	0.60	
SUCI(C)	Manas Pradhan	1,010	0.58	
BNP	Jahangir Mahammad Shaikh	754	0.43	
ABHM	Dr. Arun Kumar Giri	639	0.37	
NOTA	None of the above	2,311	1.33	
Majority		33,890	19.50	
Turnout		1,73,803	84.91	
Registered electors		2,04,691		
AITC hold		Swing		

=== 2011 ===
West Bengal assembly elections, 2011: Kanthi Dakshin
Party	Candidate	Votes	%	±%
AITC	Dibyendu Adhikari	86,933	57.12	+3.30#
CPI	Uttam Kumar Pradhan	58,296	38.31	−5.95
BJP	Dr. Kamalesh Mishra	5,004	3.29	
Independent	Sek Mahammad Jilani	1,233		
Independent	Biswanath Nayak	72		
Turnout		152,187	87.06	
AITC hold		Swing	9.25	

.# Swing calculated on Congress+Trinamool Congress vote percentages taken together in 2006. 2009 by election not taken into consideration because of lack of sufficient data.

=== 2006 ===
In the by-election held in 2009, because of the election of the sitting MLA Suvendu Adhikari to parliament from Tamluk (Lok Sabha constituency), Dibyendu Adhikari of Trinamool Congress won the Contai South seat defeating Satyendra Nath Panda of CPI.

In the 2006 state assembly elections Suvendu Adhikari of Trinamool Congress won the Contai South assembly seat defeating his nearest rival Satyendra Nath Panda of CPI. Contests in most years were multi cornered but only winners and runners are being mentioned. Sisir Adhikari of Trinamool Congress defeated Sukhendu Maiti of CPI in 2001. Sailaja Kumar Das of Congress defeated Sukhendu Maity of CPI in 1996 and 1991. Sukhendu Maity of CPI defeated Sailaja Kumar Das of Congress in 1987. Sisir Adhikari of Congress defeated Deepak Mondal, Independent, in 1982. Satyabrata Maity of Janata Party defeated Sudhir Chandra Das, Independent, in 1977.

=== 1972 ===
Sudhir Chandra Das of PSP won in 1972, 1971, 1969, 1967 and 1962. Rashbehari Pal of Congress won in 1957. In independent India's first election in 1951 Natendra Nath Das of KMPP won the Contai South seat.
