= Bhupal Chandra Panda =

Bengali revolutionary (1913-1996)

- Born: 16 July 1911; Daudpur, Nandigram, British India (Present day in Purba Medinipur district, West Bengal, India)
- Died: 8 October 1992 (aged 81); Bidhannagar, Kolkata, India
- Education: Nandigram Brajamohan Tewary Sikshaniketan, Prabhat Kumar College
- Occupation: Revolutionary
- Organization: Bengal Volunteers
- Movement: Indian Freedom Movement

Bhupal Chandra Panda (25 December 1913 – 16 September 1996) was an Indian revolutionary and member of the Bengal Volunteers who carried out assassinations against British colonial officials in an attempt to secure Indian independence.

== Early life and education ==
Bhupal Chandra Panda was born in Nandigram in the year 1911. Jaminder Braja Mohan Vidyaratna and Swarnamoyee Devi were his parents. After passing the matriculation examination from Nandigram BMT Sikshaniketan he was admitted to Prabhat Kumar College, Contai for further studies. He was a student of first batch in this college. At that time he worked alongside leaders like Birendranath Sasmal to organise the Pichhaboni Salt Satyagragha and suffered physical torture by British Police. Later he joined the Bengal Volunteers, a revolutionary organisation of British India.

== Revolutionary activities ==
After joining the Bengal Volunteers he formed a group with the members of BV. The members of this group conducted a number of Swadeshi robberies in several areas in undivided Bengal in order to raise funds for buying arms and ammunitions for revolutionary activities. He was convicted in the murder case of Magistrate Burge as he was collecting money for this purpose but it could not be proved beyond reasonable doubt due to the prodigious defence by Barrister Birendranath Sasmal, who managed to completely acquit him. But he was convicted in a political robbery case in Kulmoni dacoity Case under Narayangarh Police Jurisdiction. He was arrested from Belda Railway Station with a friend. Later, he was punished for life imprisonment in Andaman. where he was joined with the other members of the Bengal Volunteers i.e. Kamakhya Charan Ghosh, Sonatan Roy, Nanda Dulal Singh, Sukumar Sen Gupta, Santi Gopal Sen, Prabhanshu Sekhar Pal, and Sailesh Chandra Ghose etc. After release he took the leadership of Tebhaga Movement in the undivided Midnapore district.

== Later life ==
After independence of India, Panda won several elections, which included the Nandigram seat of West Bengal Assembly in 1957, 1967, 1969, 1971, 1972 and 1982, total six times. All time he was the winner of the Assembly poll as a CPI candidate. For the rest of his life he worked as a social worker. He died on 8 October 1992
