= Kanthi Lok Sabha constituency =

Lok Sabha constituency in West Bengal

Coordinates: 21.78°N 87.74°E

Kanthi WB-31
- Lok Sabha constituency
- Interactive Map Outlining Kanthi Lok Sabha Constituency

Constituency details
- Country: India
- Region: East India
- State: West Bengal
- Assembly constituencies: Chandipur; Patashpur; Kanthi Uttar; Bhagabanpur; Khejuri; Kanthi Dakshin; Ramnagar
- Established: 1951
- Total electors: 17,94,537
- Reservation: None

Member of Parliament
- 18th Lok Sabha
- Incumbent Soumendu Adhikari
- Party: BJP
- Alliance: NDA
- Elected year: 2024

Kanthi Lok Sabha constituency (earlier known as Contai Lok Sabha constituency) is one of the 543 parliamentary constituencies in India. The constituency centres on Contai in West Bengal. All the seven assembly segments of No. 31 Kanthi Lok Sabha constituency are in Purba Medinipur district. As per census 2011 Hindus form 89.7% of electors rest by Muslims, Sikhs and others.

== Assembly segments ==
Parliamentary constituencies in West Bengal - 1. Cooch Behar, 2. Alipurduars, 3. Jalpaiguri, 4. Darjeeling, 5. Raiganj, 6. Balurghat, 7. Maldaha Uttar, 8. Maldaha Dakshin, 9. Jangipur, 10. Baharampur, 11. Murshidabad, 12. Krishnanagar, 13. Ranaghat, 14. Bangaon, 15. Barrackpore, 16. Dum Dum, 17. Barasat, 18. Basirhat, 19. Jaynagar, 20. Mathurapur, 21. Diamond Harbour, 22. Jadavpur, 23. Kolkata Dakshin, 24. Kolkata Uttar, 25. Howrah, 26. Uluberia, 27. Serampore, 28. Hooghly, 29. Arambagh, 30. Tamluk, 31, Kanthi, 32. Ghatal, 33. Jhargram, 34. Medinipur, 35. Purulia, 36. Bankura, 37. Bishnupur, 38. Bardhaman Purba, 39. Bardhaman Durgapur, 40. Asansol, 41. Bolpur, 42. Birbhum

As per the order of the Delimitation Commission issued in 2006 in respect of the delimitation of constituencies in West Bengal, parliamentary constituency no. 31 Kanthi is composed of the following segments:

#	Name	District	Member	Party	2024 Lead
211	Chandipur	Purba Medinipur	Pijush Kanti Das	BJP	BJP
212	Patashpur	Purba Medinipur	Tapan Maity	BJP	AITC
213	Kanthi Uttar	Purba Medinipur	Sumita Sinha	BJP	BJP
214	Bhagabanpur	Purba Medinipur	Santanu Pramanik	BJP	BJP
215	Khejuri (SC)	Purba Medinipur	Subrata Paik	BJP	BJP
216	Kanthi Dakshin	Purba Medinipur	Arup Kumar Das	BJP	BJP
217	Ramnagar	Purba Medinipur	Chandra Sekhar Mondal	BJP	BJP

Prior to delimitation, Contai Lok Sabha constituency was composed of the following assembly segments:Bhagabanpur (assembly constituency no. 208), Khajuri (SC) (assembly constituency no. 209), Contai North (assembly constituency no. 210), Contai South (assembly constituency no. 211), Ramnagar (assembly constituency no. 212), Egra (assembly constituency no. 213) and Mugberia (assembly constituency no. 214)

== Members of Parliament ==
Year	Member	Party
1952	Basanta Kumar Das	Indian National Congress
1957	Pramathanath Banerjee	Praja Socialist Party
1962	Basanta Kumar Das	Indian National Congress
1967	Samar Guha	Praja Socialist Party
1971	Samar Guha	Praja Socialist Party
1977	Samar Guha	Janata Party
1980	Sudhir Kumar Giri	Communist Party of India (Marxist)
1984	Phulrenu Guha	Indian National Congress
1989	Sudhir Kumar Giri	Communist Party of India (Marxist)
1991	Sudhir Kumar Giri	Communist Party of India (Marxist)
1996	Sudhir Kumar Giri	Communist Party of India (Marxist)
1998	Sudhir Kumar Giri	Communist Party of India (Marxist)
1999	Nitish Sengupta	Trinamool Congress
2004	Prasanta Pradhan	Communist Party of India (Marxist)
2009	Sisir Adhikari	Trinamool Congress
2014	Sisir Adhikari	Trinamool Congress
2019	Sisir Adhikari	Trinamool Congress
2021	Sisir Adhikari	Bharatiya Janata Party
2024	Soumendu Adhikari	Bharatiya Janata Party

== Election results ==
Vote share of Winning candidates
2024	49.85%
2019	49.98%
2014	52.80%
2009	53.95%
2004	50.04%
1999	48.45%
1998	47.80%
1996	48.71%
1991	47.23%
1989	51.70%
1984	50.61%
1980	50.28%
1977	74.84%
1971	41.70%
1967	46.70%
1962	58.06%
1957	49.27%
1951	37.92%

=== 2024 ===
2024 Indian general elections: Kanthi
Party	Candidate	Votes	%	±%
BJP	Soumendu Adhikari	763,195	49.85	▲7.71
AITC	Uttam Barik	7,15,431	46.73	▼3.25
INC	Urbashi Banerjee	31,122	2.03	▲0.85
NOTA	None of the above	8,134	0.53	▼0.08
Majority		47,764	3.12	▼4.72
Turnout		15,30,997	85.31	▼0.52
BJP gain from AITC		Swing		

=== 2019 ===
2019 Indian general elections: Kanthi
Party	Candidate	Votes	%	±%
AITC	Sisir Kumar Adhikari	711,872	49.98	−3.82
BJP	Dr. Debasish Samanta	600,204	42.14	+33.54
CPI(M)	Paritosh Pattyanayak	76,185	5.35	−29.37
INC	Dipak Kumar Das	16,851	1.18	−0.92
Majority		111,668	7.84	−10.24
Turnout		1,424,966	85.83	−0.78
AITC hold		Swing		

=== 2014 ===
2014 Indian general elections: Kanthi
Party	Candidate	Votes	%	±%
AITC	Sisir Kumar Adhikari	6,76,749	52.80	−1.54
CPI(M)	Tapas Sinha	4,48,259	34.72	−7.75
BJP	Kamalendu Pahari	1,11,082	8.60	+5.76
INC	Kunal Banerjee	27,230	2.10	
BSP	Ansar Ali Sk	8,298		
SUCI(C)	Manas Pradhan	7,335		
Independent	Sk Golam Nabi Ajad	3,260		
Majority		2,28,490	18.08	
Turnout		12,90,811	86.61	
AITC hold		Swing		

=== 2009 ===
2009 Indian general elections: Kanthi
Party	Candidate	Votes	%	±%
AITC	Sisir Kumar Adhikari	6,06,712	53.95	
CPI(M)	Prasanta Pradhan	4,77,609	42.47	
BJP	Amalesh Mishra	31,952	2.84	
BSP	Rashbehari Patra	8,174		
Majority		1,29,103	12.48	
Turnout		11,24,454	89.97	
AITC gain from CPI(M)		Swing		

=== 2004 ===
General Election, 2004: Contai
Party	Candidate	Votes	%	±%
CPI(M)	Prasanta Pradhan	464,743	50.04	
AITC	Dr Nitish Sengupta	405,553	44.00	
INC	Kshitindra Mohan Sahoo	26,010	2.8	
Independent	Jiban Das	11,707	1.30	
Independent	Adhar Chandra Nahal	9,676	1.0	
BSP	Asalata Majumdar	9,085	1.0	
Turnout		9,21,634	85.3	
CPI(M) gain from AITC		Swing		

=== 1999 ===
1999 Indian general election: Contai
Party	Candidate	Votes	%	±%
AITC	Neetish Sengupta	395,048	48.45	
CPI(M)	Sudhir Giri	3,82,915	46.96	
INC	Ajit Khanra	34,070	4.18	
JD(S)	Sudarsan Manna	1,451	0.18	
NCP	Dr. B. Dev Roy	1,038	0.13	
Independent	Manabendra Mandal	636	0.08	
Independent	Tapan Kumar Mandal	290	0.04	
Majority		12,133	1.49	
Turnout		8,23,941	83.15	
Swing to AITC from CPI(M)		Swing		

=== 1998 ===
1998 Indian general election: Contai
Party	Candidate	Votes	%	±%
CPI(M)	Sudhir Giri	394,017	47.80	
AITC	Akhil Giri	3,19,159	38.72	
INC	Sisir Kumar Adhikari	1,10,249	13.37	
AMB	Hrishikesh Das	924	0.11	
Majority		74,858	9.08	
Turnout		8,34,197	85.79	
CPI(M) hold		Swing		

=== 1996 ===
1996 Indian general election: Contai
Party	Candidate	Votes	%	±%
CPI(M)	Sudhir Giri	397,028	48.71	
INC	Nitish Sengupta	3,72,986	45.76	
BJP	Amalesh Misra	32,924	4.04	
Independent	Nikhilesh Nanda	7,317	0.90	
Independent	Joytirmoy Maity	3,442	0.42	
Independent	Adhar Nahal	772	0.09	
Independent	Goutam Pahari	637	0.08	
Majority		24,042	2.95	
Turnout		8,29,074	89.03	
CPI(M) hold		Swing		

=== 1991 ===
1991 Indian general election: Contai
Party	Candidate	Votes	%	±%
CPI(M)	Sudhir Giri	323,390	47.23	
INC	Abha Maiti	3,00,274	43.85	
BJP	Amelesh Misra	45,384	6.63	
Independent	Bimal Jana	4,946	0.72	
JP	Arabinda Manna	4,799	0.70	
Independent	Rana Santosh	3,503	0.51	
Doordarshi Party	Kahar Bateswar	1,239	0.18	
HM	Adhar Nahal	1,211	0.18	
Majority		23,116	3.38	
Turnout		6,96,283	80.02	
CPI(M) hold		Swing		

=== 1989 ===
1989 Indian general election: Contai
Party	Candidate	Votes	%	±%
CPI(M)	Sudhir Giri	364,318	51.70	
INC	Abha Maiti	3,37,238	47.86	
Independent	Adhar Nahal	3,086	0.44	
Majority		27,080	3.84	
Turnout		7,12,006	82.89	
Swing to CPI(M) from INC		Swing		

=== 1984 ===
1984 Indian general election: Contai
Party	Candidate	Votes	%	±%
INC	Phulrenu Guha	282,065	50.61	
CPI(M)	Sudhi Kumar Giri	2,68,307	48.14	
Independent	Pramathes Gaunia	3,403	0.61	
Independent	Arabinda Manna	2,201	0.39	
Independent	Mandanlal Prasari	1,389	0.25	
Majority		13,758	2.47	
Turnout		5,64,583	80.99	
Swing to INC from CPI(M)		Swing		

=== 1980 ===
1980 Indian general election: Contai
Party	Candidate	Votes	%	±%
CPI(M)	Sudhir Kumar Giri	237,002	50.28	New entry
INC(I)	Pradip Sarkar	1,47,228	31.23	▲7.56
JP	Samar Guha	80,111	17.00	▼57.84
Independent	Prasanta Kumar Gaunia	3,155	0.67	Steady
JP(S)	Atal Kumar Giri	2,721	0.58	New entry
Independent	Sasadhar Maity	1,161	0.25	Steady
Majority		89,774	19.05	
Turnout		4,77,134	74.06	
Swing to CPI(M) from JP		Swing		

=== 1977 ===
1977 Indian general election: Contai
Party	Candidate	Votes	%	±%
JP	Samar Guha	284,509	74.84	New entry
INC	Sudhangshu Panda	89,995	23.67	▲11.94
Independent	Sushi Kumar Sahu	5,658	1.49	Steady
Majority		1,94,514	51.17	▲30.44
Turnout		3,88,122	66.70	▼0.81
Swing to JP from PSP		Swing		

=== 1971 ===
1971 Indian general election: Contai
Party	Candidate	Votes	%	±%
PSP	Samar Guha	141,540	41.70	▼5.00
INC(O)	Abha Maity	71,181	20.97	New entry
CPI(M)	Som Nath Bhattacharyya	61,082	18.00	New entry
INC	Basanta Kumar Das	39,817	11.73	▼30.13
Independent	Bimala Nanda Sasmal	25,768	7.59	Steady
Majority		70,359	20.73	▲15.89
Turnout		3,60,838	67.51	▼3.94
PSP hold		Swing		

=== 1967 ===
1967 Indian general election: Contai
Party	Candidate	Votes	%	±%
PSP	G. Samar	165,472	46.70	▲15.08
INC	R. Pal	1,48,303	41.86	▼16.02
SSP	P. B. Sen	40,534	11.44	New entry
Majority		17,169	4.84	▼21.60
Turnout		3,66,246	71.45	▲6.80
Swing to PSP from INC		Swing		

=== 1962 ===
1962 Indian general election: Contai
Party	Candidate	Votes	%	±%
INC	Basanta Kumar Das	187,548	58.06	▲10.39
PSP	Prafulla Chandra Ghosh	1,02,140	31.62	▼17.65
Independent	Pulin Sen	33,345	10.32	Steady
Majority		85,408	26.44	▲24.84
Turnout		3,32,199	64.65	▲3.15
Swing to INC from PSP		Swing		

=== 1957 ===
1957 Indian general election: Contai
Party	Candidate	Votes	%	±%
PSP	Pramatha Nath Bandopadhaya	133,853	49.27	New entry
INC	Basanta K. Das	1,29,491	47.67	▲9.75
Independent	Pulin Sen	8,304	3.06	Steady
Majority		4,362	1.60	▲1.54
Turnout		2,71,648	61.50	▲5.46
Swing to PSP from INC		Swing		

=== 1951 ===
1951 Indian general election: Contai
Party	Candidate	Votes	%	±%
INC	Basanta Kumar Dass	79,809	37.92	New entry
KMPP	Promatha Nath Bandopadhya	79,682	37.86	New entry
Socialist	Pulin Behari Sen	50,980	24.22	New entry
Majority		127	0.06	New entry
Turnout		2,10,471	56.04	New entry
INC win (new seat)				

== See also ==
- Contai
- List of constituencies of the Lok Sabha
