= Nandigram =

- Census town
- Location in West Bengal, India Nandigram (India)
- Coordinates: 22.01°N 87.99°E
- Country: India
- State: West Bengal
- District: Purba Medinipur

Area
  - Total: 2.5577 km^{2} (0.9875 sq mi)
- Elevation: 6 m (20 ft)

Population (2011)
  - Total: 5,803
  - Density: 2,269/km^{2} (5,876/sq mi)

Languages
  - Official: Bengali, English
- Time zone: UTC+5:30 (IST)
- Vehicle registration: WB
- Lok Sabha constituency: Tamluk
- Vidhan Sabha constituency: Nandigram
- Website: purbamedinipur.gov.in

Nandigram is a census town in the Nandigram I Community Development Block of the Haldia subdivision in the Purba Medinipur district of the Indian state of West Bengal.

In 2007, the West Bengal government allowed the Salim Group to set up a chemical hub at Nandigram under the special economic zone policy. This led to resistance by the villagers resulting in clashes with the police that left 14 villagers dead, and resulted in accusations of police brutality.

== Geography ==
Cities and towns in Haldia subdivision of Purba Medinipur district
M: municipal city/town, CT: census town, R: rural/urban centre, S: port
Owing to space constraints in the small map, the actual locations in a larger map may vary slightly

=== Police station ===
Nandigram's police station has jurisdiction over the Nandigram I and Nandigram II community development blocks. Nandigram's police station covers an area of 251.25km^{2} with a population of 279,285.

=== Urbanisation ===
79.19% of the Haldia subdivision's population lives in rural areas. Only 20.81% of the population lives in urban areas, and that is the highest proportion of urban population among the four subdivisions in the Purba Medinipur district.

Note: The map alongside presents some of the notable locations in the subdivision. All places marked in the map are linked in the larger full screen map.

== Demographics ==
According to the 2011 Census of India, Nandigram had a total population of 5,803 of which 2,947 (51%) were males and 2,856 (49%) were females. There were 725 people below the age of 6. The total number of literate people in Nandigram was 4,512 (88.85% of the population over 6 years old).

== Notable people ==
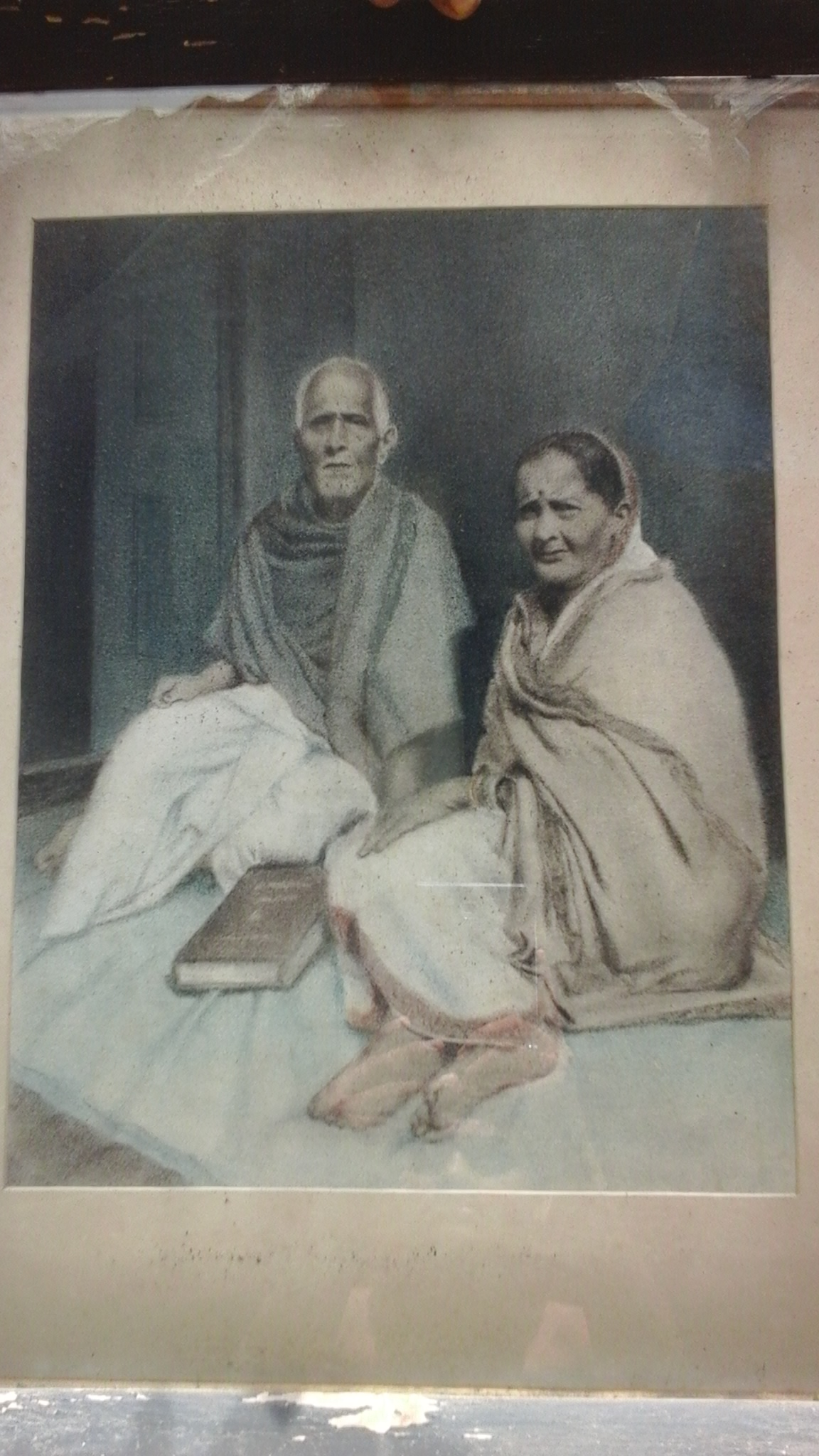

Although this part of Bengal has not been actively highlighted in Indian history during the British period, the area had been a part of active politics from the British era. With the help of the people of Nandigram, "Tamluk" was freed from the British by Bhupal Chandra Panda, Ajoy Mukherjee, Sushil Kumar Dhara, Satish Chandra Samanta and their friends for a few days (which is the only part of modern India to be freed twice), before India gained independence in 1947.

In post-Independent India, Nandigram had been a centre of learning and played a major part in the development of Haldia, a satellite town of Calcutta (Kolkata). Fresh vegetables, rice and fish are supplied to Haldia from Nandigram. The Ganga (Bhagirathi) and Haldi (downstream of Kanshabati) cover the edges of Nandigram, and the land is fertilised by both the rivers.

== Transport ==
There is no rail connection directly to Nandigram, and roadways are moderately developed. Buses, jitney trekkers and van rickshaws are the primary public vehicles inside the villages.

The nearest railway station is Mograjpur, connecting from Digha - Tamluk. The nearest busy bus stop is in Math Chandipur.

Nandigram is connected to Haldia by a ferry. This ferry service is an important mode of transport for farmers and small traders from Nandigram, who use this service to reach Haldia's market to sell their commodities. Haldia Municipality runs this ferry service.

== Education ==
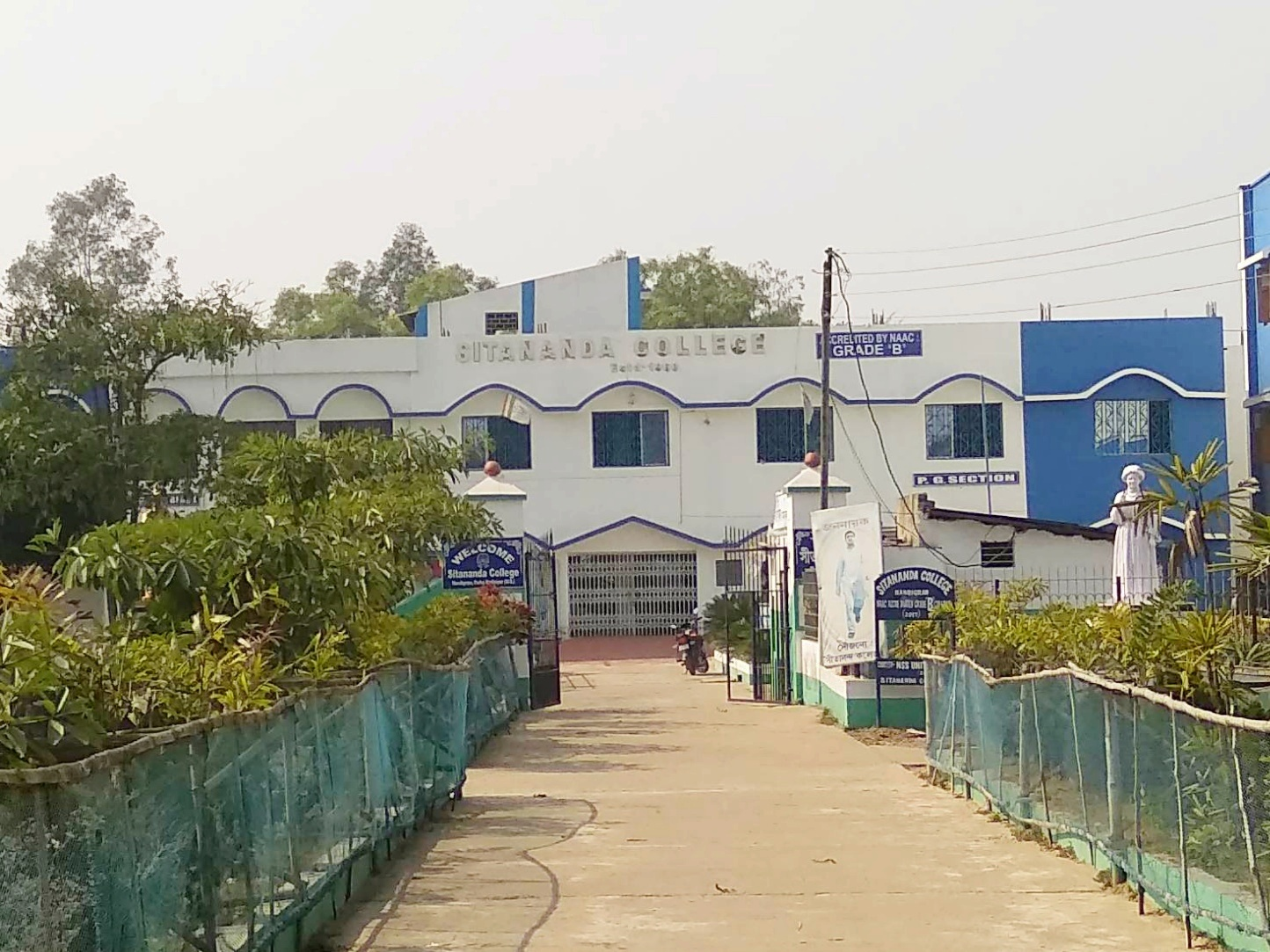
Sitananda College, Nandigram

Nandigram boasts a diverse educational landscape, catering to students from preschool to higher education. Five primary schools provide the foundation for learning, while the town's Secondary School, Nandigram BM Girls High School, caters to middle school needs. For higher secondary education, students can attend Nandigram BMT Sikshaniketan. Additionally, several private KG schools offer early childhood education options. Higher education is represented by Sitananda College, also known as Nandigram College, which is affiliated to Vidyasagar University.

== Healthcare ==
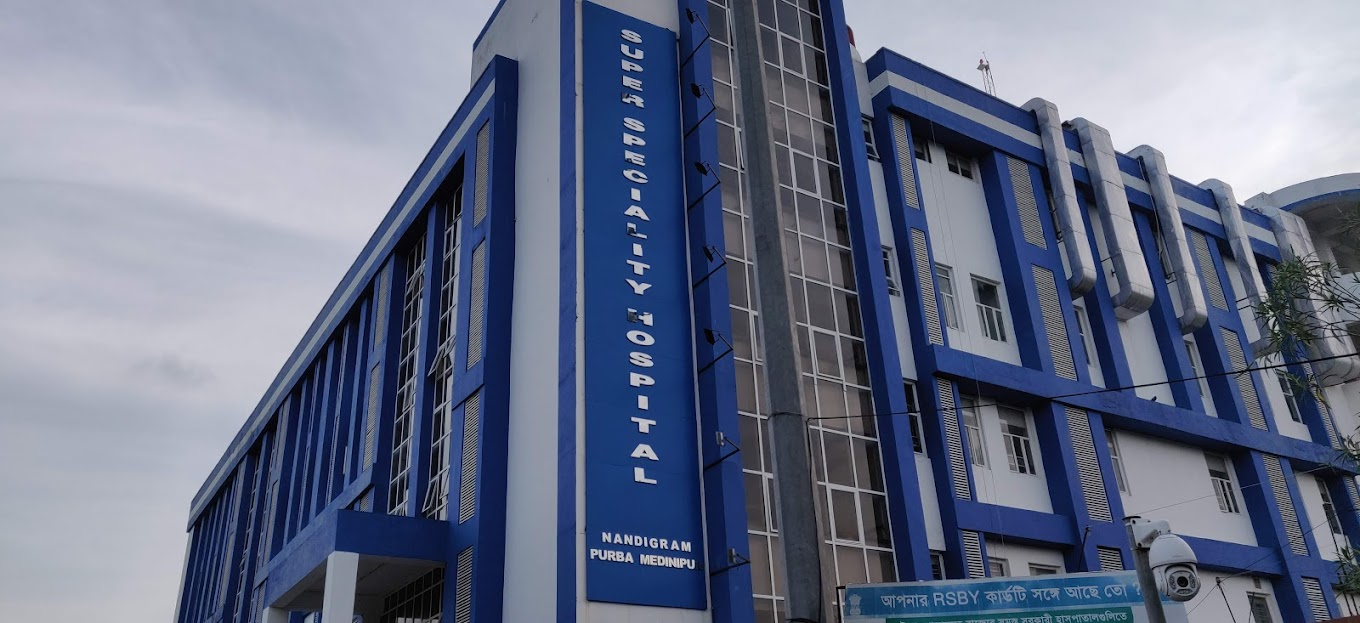
Nandigram SSH/DH

In Nandigram, Nandigram Super Speciality Hospital serves as the town's main medical facility for specialised care. Additionally, two private nursing homes offer further options for medical needs.

== See also ==
- Accumulation by dispossession
- Primitive accumulation of capital
- Common land
