= Kanthi mala =

String or necklace worn by some Hindus

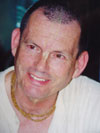
Hansadutta Swami of ISKCON wearing a tulasi kanthi mala.

A kanthi mala, or simply kanthi (Sanskrit: कण्ठी, kaṇṭhī, lit. "necklace"), is a necklace made of beads from the tulasi (basil) plant, threaded on a string worn, and worn by some adherents of Hinduism.

== Vaishnavism ==
Followers of Gaudiya Vaishnavism wear kanthi malas made of Ocimum tenuiflorum (known in Hinduism as tulasi). Most Vaishnavas of this sect are given their kanthi by their guru at the time of diksha, or spiritual initiation.

It is said Krishna – who is revered as Svayam Bhagavan, or the "Self-Existent Lord," in Gaudiya Vaishnavism – was very fond of tulasi, and as such the plant is worshipped as "Tulasi devi" by followers of Krishna. Tulasi devi is considered to be "one of Krishna's most intimate servants" and provide protection to his devotees, and as such, Gaudiya Vaishnavas try to avoid removing their tulasi kanthis under any circumstances.

== Shaivism ==
Shaivites wear a kanthi made of rudraksha. The name "rudraksha" is derived from the Sanskrit rudrākṣa, meaning "Eye of Rudra".

== Other traditions ==
Kanthi malas are also worn by followers of the Swaminarayan Sampradaya and the Kabir panth. Swaminarayan instructed his followers to wear a double-stranded kanthi made of tulasi, symbolising Radha–Krishna, while Kabir instructed his disciples to wear triple-stranded kanthis – symbolising the Hindu trinity of Brahma, Vishnu, and Shiva – with one large bead made from either tulasi or rudraksha for Satya Purusha, the "supreme lord who dwells within, who is above all else."
