= Sreerampur Lok Sabha constituency =

Lok Sabha constituency in West Bengal

Coordinates: 22.7500°N 88.3400°E

Sreerampur WB-27
- Lok Sabha constituency
- Interactive Map Outlining Sreerampur Lok Sabha Constituency

Constituency details
- Country: India
- Region: East India
- State: West Bengal
- Assembly constituencies: Jagatballavpur; Domjur; Uttarpara; Sreerampur; Champdani; Chanditala; Jangipara
- Established: 1951
- Total electors: 1,624,038
- Reservation: None

Member of Parliament
- 18th Lok Sabha
- Incumbent Kalyan Banerjee
- Party: MAITC
- Alliance: INDIA
- Elected year: 2024

Sreerampur Lok Sabha constituency (previously known as Serampore-26 and changed to Sreerampur-27 in the 2009 election) is one of the 543 Lok Sabha (parliamentary) constituencies in India. The constituency centres on Serampore in West Bengal. Five assembly segments of the constituency are in Hooghly district and two are in Howrah district.

Most Successful parties from Sreerampur Lok Sabha Constituency Since 1951
1. Communist Party of India (Marxist) (6 times) (33.3%)
2. Trinamool Congress (6 times) (33.3%)
3. Indian National Congress (4 times) (22.2%)
4. Communist Party of India (2 times) (11.1%)

== Overview ==
1. Cooch Behar, 2. Alipurduars, 3. Jalpaiguri, 4. Darjeeling, 5. Raiganj, 6. Balurghat, 7. Maldaha Uttar, 8. Maldaha Dakshin, 9. Jangipur, 10. Baharampur, 11. Murshidabad, 12. Krishnanagar, 13. Ranaghat, 14. Bangaon, 15. Barrackpore, 16. Dum Dum, 17. Barasat, 18. Basirhat, 19. Jaynagar, 20. Mathurapur, 21. Diamond Harbour, 22. Jadavpur, 23. Kolkata Dakshin, 24. Kolkata Uttar, 25. Howrah, 26. Uluberia, 27. Serampore, 28. Hooghly, 29. Arambagh, 30. Tamluk, 31, Kanthi, 32. Ghatal, 33. Jhargram, 34. Medinipur, 35. Purulia, 36. Bankura, 37. Bishnupur, 38. Bardhaman Purba, 39. Bardhaman Durgapur, 40. Asansol, 41. Bolpur, 42. Birbhum

Srerampur is basically an industrial constituency with an agricultural hinterland. The Howrah-Hooghly industrial belt on the west bank of the Hooghly river covers the Howrah, Hooghly and Srerampur constituency.

According to The Hindu, Serampore and Howrah constituencies have more than 25% non-Bengali voters with their roots in Rajasthan, Bihar or Uttar Pradesh.

== Assembly segments ==
As per order of the Delimitation Commission issued in 2006 in respect of the delimitation of constituencies in West Bengal, parliamentary constituency No. 27 Sreerampur is composed of the following segments:

#	Name	District	Member	Party	2024 Lead
183	Jagatballavpur	Howrah	Anupam Ghosh	BJP	AITC
184	Domjur	Howrah	Tapas Maity	DTC	AITC
185	Uttarpara	Hooghly	Dipanjan Chakraborty	BJP	AITC
186	Sreerampur	Hooghly	Bhaskar Bhattacharya	BJP	AITC
187	Champdani	Hooghly	Dilip Singh	BJP	AITC
194	Chanditala	Hooghly	Swati Khandoker	DTC	AITC
195	Jangipara	Hooghly	Prosenjit Bag	BJP	AITC

== Members of Parliament ==
Most of the contests were multi-cornered. However, only winners and runners-up are mentioned below:

Year	Member	Party
1952	Tushar Kanti Chattopadhyaya	Communist Party of India
1957	Jitendra Nath Lahiri	Indian National Congress
1962	Dinendra Nath Bhattacharya	Communist Party of India
1967	Bimal Kanti Ghosh	Indian National Congress
1971	Dinendra Nath Bhattacharya	Communist Party of India (Marxist)
1977	Dinendra Nath Bhattacharya	Communist Party of India (Marxist)
1980	Dinendra Nath Bhattacharya	Communist Party of India (Marxist)
1981^	Ajit Bag	Communist Party of India (Marxist)
1984	Bimal Kanti Ghosh	Indian National Congress
1989	Sudarsan Roy Chowdhury	Communist Party of India (Marxist)
1991	Sudarsan Roy Chowdhury	Communist Party of India (Marxist)
1996	Pradip Bhattacharya	Indian National Congress
1998	Akbar Ali Khondkar	Trinamool Congress
1999	Akbar Ali Khondkar	Trinamool Congress
2004	Santasri Chatterjee	Communist Party of India (Marxist)
2009	Kalyan Banerjee	Trinamool Congress
2014	Kalyan Banerjee	Trinamool Congress
2019	Kalyan Banerjee	Trinamool Congress
2024	Kalyan Banerjee	Trinamool Congress
2026	Kalyan Banerjee	Mamata All India Trinamool Congress

- ^ denotes by-election

== Election results ==
=== General election 2024 ===
2024 Indian general election: Sreerampur
Party	Candidate	Votes	%	±%
AITC	Kalyan Banerjee	673,970	45.65	▲0.15
BJP	Kabir Shankar Bose	4,99,140	33.80	▼4.67
CPI(M)	Dipsita Dhar	2,39,160	16.20	▲5.40
AISF	Shahriar Mullick	25,677	1.74	New
NOTA	None of the above	15,034	1.02	
Majority		1,74,830		
Turnout		1,476,532	76.44	−2.10
AITC hold		Swing		

=== 2019 ===
2019 Indian general election: Serampore
Party	Candidate	Votes	%	±%
AITC	Kalyan Banerjee	637,707	45.48	
BJP	Debjit Sarkar	5,39,171	38.45	
CPI(M)	Tirthankar Ray	1,52,281	10.86	
INC	Debabrata Biswas	32,509	2.32	
NOTA	None of the above	20,501	1.46	
IND	3 Independent Candidates	11,621	0.82	
OTH	4 Other Party Candidates	7,915	0.56	
Majority		98,536	7.03	
Turnout		1,402,259	78.54	
AITC hold		Swing		

=== 2014 ===
2014 Indian general election: Serampore
Party	Candidate	Votes	%	±%
AITC	Kalyan Banerjee	514,933	39.88	
CPI(M)	Tirthankar Ray	3,62,407	28.07	
BJP	Bappi Lahiri	2,87,712	22.28	
INC	Abdul Mannan	86,099	6.67	
NOTA	None of the above	15,374	1.19	
IND	3 Independent Candidates	13,564	1.05	
OTH	3 Other Party Candidates	10,344	0.80	
Majority		1,52,526	11.81	
Turnout		12,90,433	79.46	
AITC hold		Swing		

=== 2009 ===
2009 Indian general election: Serampore
Party	Candidate	Votes	%	±%
AITC	Kalyan Banerjee	569,725	52.68	
CPI(M)	Santasri Chatterjee	4,32,535	40.00	
BJP	Debabrata Chowdhury	38,476	3.56	
IND	3 Independent Candidates	21,618	2.00	
OTH	2 Other Party Candidates	19,048	1.76	
Majority		1,37,190	12.68	
Turnout		10,81,442	77.51	
AITC gain from CPI(M)		Swing		

=== 2004 ===
2004 Indian general election: Serampore
Party	Candidate	Votes	%	±%
CPI(M)	Santasri Chatterjee	404,082	42.70	
AITC	Akbar Ali Khondkar	3,84,395	40.62	
INC	Kesto Mukherjee	1,25,020	13.21	
IND	4 Independent Candidates	21,893	2.31	
OTH	3 Other Party Candidates	10,858	1.15	
Majority		19,687	2.08	
Turnout		10,81,402	77.49	
CPI(M) gain from AITC		Swing		

=== 1999 ===
1999 Indian general election: Serampore
Party	Candidate	Votes	%	±%
AITC	Akbar Ali Khondkar	411,406	45.14	
CPI(M)	Sudarsan Roy Chaudhury	3,63,642	39.90	
INC	Pradip Bhattacharya	1,33,155	14.61	
IND	Goutam Pyne	1,609	0.18	
IND	Harun Rashid Mullick	1,494	0.16	
Majority		47,764	5.24	
Turnout		9,25,995	69.87	
AITC hold		Swing		

=== 1998 ===
1998 Indian general election: Serampore
Party	Candidate	Votes	%	±%
AITC	Akbor Ali Khandoker (Note: Contested as "West Bengal Trinamool Congress (WBTC)")	439,269	44.68	
CPI(M)	Sudarsan Ray Chaudhuri	3,94,658	40.14	
INC	Pradip Bhattacharya	1,43,999	14.65	
LS	Ashoke Roy	4,064	0.41	
IND	Gopal Sarkar	1,252	0.13	
Majority		44,611	4.54	
Turnout		9,98,052	76.29	
AITC gain from INC		Swing		

=== 1996 ===
1996 Indian general election: Serampore
Party	Candidate	Votes	%	±%
INC	Pradip Bhattacharya	449,205	46.44	
CPI(M)	Sudarsan Roy Chaudhuri	4,43,742	45.87	
BJP	Debabrata Chowdhary	60,122	6.22	
AIIC(T)	Swaraj Mukhopadhyay	9,600	0.99	
IND	3 Independent Candidates	4,679	0.48	
Majority		5,463	0.57	
Turnout		9,90,773	79.28	
INC gain from CPI(M)		Swing		

=== 1991 ===
1991 Indian general election: Serampore
Party	Candidate	Votes	%	±%
CPI(M)	Sudarsan Roy Chowdhury	366,535	46.21	
INC	Bimalkanti Ghosh	3,22,038	40.60	
BJP	Dwarka Prasad Thirani	91,289	11.51	
IND	5 Independent Candidates	9,432	1.19	
OTH	2 Other Party Candidates	3,944	0.49	
Majority		44,497	5.61	
Turnout		8,10,618	72.31	
CPI(M) hold		Swing		

=== 1989 ===
1989 Indian general election: Serampore
Party	Candidate	Votes	%	±%
CPI(M)	Sudarsan Ray Chowdhuri	426,994	53.02	
INC	Bimal Kanti Ghosh	3,60,536	44.77	
BJP	Dwarka Prasad	11,530	1.43	
OTH	3 Other Candidates	6,231	0.78	
Majority		66,458	8.25	
Turnout		8,20,770	76.96	
CPI(M) gain from INC		Swing		

=== 1984 ===
1984 Indian general election: Serampore
Party	Candidate	Votes	%	±%
INC	Bimal Kanti Ghosh	338,152	51.50	
CPI(M)	Ajit Bag	3,07,921	46.90	
IND	4 Independent Candidates	10,491	1.60	
Majority		30,231	4.60	
Turnout		6,71,287	76.70	
INC gain from CPI(M)		Swing		

=== By-election 1981 ===
A by-election was held in this constituency in 1981 which was necessitated by the Death of sitting MP Dinen Bhattacharya.In the by-election, Ajit Bag of CPIM defeated his nearest rival S.M Roy of Congress by 96,549 votes.

Indian Parliamentary bye election, 1981: Serampore constituency
Party	Candidate	Votes	%	±%
CPI(M)	Ajit Bag	265,372		
INC(I)	S.M.Roy	168,823		
Independent	A.N.Chowdhury	2,980		
Independent	S.C.Mahato	1,594		
Majority		96,549	7.25	
Turnout				
CPI(M) hold		Swing		

=== 1980 ===
1980 Indian general election: Serampore
Party	Candidate	Votes	%	±%
CPI(M)	Dinendra Bhattacharya	292,993	59.93	
INC(I)	Gopal Das Nag	1,86,886	38.23	
IND	4 Independent Candidates	8,975	1.83	
Majority		1,06,107	21.70	
Turnout		5,01,575	64.80	
CPI(M) hold		Swing		

=== 1977 ===
1977 Indian general election: Serampore
Party	Candidate	Votes	%	±%
CPI(M)	Dinen Bhattacharya	260,071	68.38	
CPI	Jadu Gopal Sen	1,20,256	31.62	
Majority		1,39,815	36.76	
Turnout		3,92,237	62.44	
CPI(M) hold		Swing		

=== 1971 ===
1971 Indian general election: Serampore
Party	Candidate	Votes	%	±%
CPI(M)	Dinendra Nath Bhattacharyya	167,530	48.94	
CPI	Jadu Gopal Sen	1,05,072	30.70	
INC(O)	Bimal Kanti Ghosh	61,641	18.01	
IND	Manik Chandra Sit	8,045	2.35	
Majority		62,458	18.24	
Turnout		3,60,050	65.33	
CPI(M) gain from INC		Swing		

=== 1967 ===
1967 Indian general election: Serampore
Party	Candidate	Votes	%	±%
INC	B. Ghosh	160,662	44.49	
CPI(M)	D. N. Bhattacharya	1,37,826	38.16	
CPI	J. Sen	62,645	17.35	
Majority		22,836	6.33	
Turnout		3,74,672	73.98	
INC gain from CPI		Swing		

=== 1962 ===
1962 Indian general election: Serampore
Party	Candidate	Votes	%	±%
CPI	Dinendra Nath Bhattacharya	172,992	51.62	
INC	Jitendra Nath Lahiri	1,62,130	48.38	
Majority		10,862	3.24	
Turnout		3,43,698	65.88	
CPI gain from INC		Swing		

=== 1957 ===
1957 Indian general election: Serampore
Party	Candidate	Votes	%	±%
INC	Jitendra Nath Lahiri	125,798	51.12	
CPI	Tusar Chattopadhyay	1,20,264	48.88	
Majority		5,534	2.24	
Turnout		2,46,062	57.47	
INC gain from CPI		Swing		

=== 1952 ===
1951–52 Indian general election: Serampore
Party	Candidate	Votes	%	±%
CPI	Tusar Kanti Chattopadhyaya	77,734	40.71	
INC	Sachindra Chaudhuri	68,798	36.03	
IND	Tulsi Charan Goswami	27,774	14.55	
Socialist	Balai Chandra Paul	9,265	4.85	
HM	Shamaprosad Mukherjee	7,353	3.85	
Majority		8,936	4.68	
Turnout		1,90,924	49.99	
CPI win (new seat)				

== See also ==
- List of constituencies of the Lok Sabha
- Election Commission of India
