= Snehasis Chakraborty =

Indian politician

Transport Minister of West Bengal
- In office 3 August 2022 – 4 May 2026
- Governor: La. Ganesan (additional charge); C. V. Ananda Bose; R. N. Ravi
- Chief Minister: Mamata Banerjee
- Preceded by: Firhad Hakim
- Succeeded by: Arjun Singh

Member of the West Bengal Legislative Assembly
- In office 13 May 2011 – 7 May 2026
- Preceded by: Sudarshan Roy Chowdhury
- Succeeded by: Prosenjit Bag
- Constituency: Jangipara

State Spokesperson, Trinamool Congress, West Bengal
- In office 2019–2026

District President, Trinamool Congress, Hooghly District Committee
- In office 16 August 2021 – 1 August 2022
- Preceded by: Dilip Yadav
- Succeeded by: Arindam Guin

Chairperson, Government Assurance Committee, West Bengal Legislative Assembly
- In office May 2021 – August 2022

Chairperson, Industry and Commerce Committee, West Bengal Legislative Assembly
- In office May 2021 – August 2022

District President, Hooghly District Trinamool Youth Congress
- In office 31 January 2006 – June 2014

Personal details
- Born: 1 February 1970 (age 56) Kanaipur, Konnagar, Hooghly
- Party: Trinamool Congress
- Spouse: Sujata Chakraborty (m. 2004)
- Children: Anjishnu Chakraborty
- Education: City College, Kolkata(B.Com); University of Calcutta (M. Com.)
- Profession: Politician

Snehasis Chakraborty is an Indian politician who serves as Minister in Charge for Department of Transport Government of West Bengal. He is an MLA, elected from the Jangipara constituency in the 2011 West Bengal state assembly election. In 2016 and 2021 assembly election he was re-elected from the same constituency.
