= Dinendra Nath Bhattacharya =

Indian politician (1915–1980)

Dinen Bhattacharya

Member of Parliament, Lok Sabha
- In office 1962–1967
- Preceded by: Jitendra Nath Lahiri
- Succeeded by: Bimal Kanti Ghosh
- In office 1971–1980
- Preceded by: Bimal Kanti Ghosh
- Succeeded by: Bimal Kanti Ghosh
- Constituency: Serampore, West Bengal

Personal details
- Born: 12 December 1915
- Died: 11 July 1980 (aged 64)
- Party: Communist Party of India (Marxist)
- Other political affiliations: Communist Party of India, Indian National Congress

Dinendra Nath Bhattacharya (1915–1980) also known as Dinen Bhattacharya was an Indian politician. He was elected to the Lok Sabha, the lower house of the Parliament of India from the Sreerampur constituency of West Bengal in 1962 as a member of the Communist Party of India and in 1971,1977 and 1980 as a member of the Communist Party of India (Marxist).
