= Swaraj Mukherjee =

Indian politician

MLA of Uttarpara
- In office 2001–2003
- Preceded by: Jyoti Krishna Chattopadhyay
- Succeeded by: Jyoti Krishna Chattopadhyay

Personal details
- Born: 1941/42
- Died: 6 April 2003 (aged 61)
- Party: Trinamool Congress
- Spouse: Indrani Mukherjee

Swaraj Mukherjee (1941/42 – 6 April 2003) was an Indian politician belonging to Trinamool Congress. He was elected as a legislator of West Bengal Legislative Assembly from Uttarpara in 2001. He died on 6 April 2003 at the age of 61.
