= Santasri Chatterjee =

Indian politician (born 1940)

Member of Parliament, 14th Lok Sabha
- In office 2004-2009
- Preceded by: Akbar Ali Khandoker
- Succeeded by: Kalyan Banerjee
- Constituency: Serampore

Member of West Bengal Legislative Assembly
- In office 1971-1996
- Preceded by: Manoranjan Hazra
- Succeeded by: Jyoti Krishna Chattopadhyay
- Constituency: Uttarpara

Personal details
- Born: 10 May 1940 (age 86) Hooghly, West Bengal
- Party: Communist Party of India (Marxist)
- Spouse: Jharna Chatterjee
- Children: Suchetana Chatterjee Sil
- As of 17 September, 2006

Santasri Chatterjee (born 10 May 1940) is a former member of the 14th Lok Sabha of India. He represented the Serampore constituency of West Bengal and a member of the Communist Party of India (Marxist). In 2009, he lost to Kalyan Banerjee of Trinamool Congress.

He was also a 6-time MLA from Uttarpara Assembly constituency representing Communist Party of India (Marxist) from 1971 to 1996. After him Uttarpara elected a new MLA every time elections held. He is still very popular amongst party and trade union workers in his area.
