= Anwarul Hoque =

Indian politician

Member of Assam Legislative Assembly
- In office 2006–2011
- Preceded by: Jamal Uddin Ahmed
- Succeeded by: Jamal Uddin Ahmed
- Constituency: Badarpur

Personal details
- Party: All India United Democratic Front

Anwarul Hoque was a former legislator of Assam who won the 2006 Assam Legislative Assembly election from Badarpur constituency.
