= Prabir Kumar Ghosal =

Indian politician (born 1957)

Member of the West Bengal Legislative Assembly
- In office 19 May 2016 – 2 May 2021
- Preceded by: Anup Ghoshal
- Succeeded by: Kanchan Mullick
- Constituency: Uttarpara

Personal details
- Born: 22 October 1957 (age 68) Konnagar, West Bengal, India
- Party: Trinamool Congress; Bharatiya Janata Party
- Children: 2
- Occupation: Politician

Prabir Kumar Ghosal (born 1957) is an Indian politician from West Bengal. He is a former member of the West Bengal Legislative Assembly from Uttarpara Assembly constituency in Hooghly district. He was elected in the 2016 West Bengal Legislative Assembly election representing the All India Trinamool Congress. He joined Bharatiya Janata Party in 2021.

== Early life and education ==
Ghosal is from Konnagar, Hooghly district, West Bengal. He is the son of late Ajit Kumar Ghosal. He completed his graduation at a college affiliated with the University of Calcutta in 1980. His wife runs the family business.

== Career ==
Ghosal was elected in the Uttarpara Assembly constituency representing the All India Trinamool Congress. In 2016 Assembly election, he polled 84,918 votes and defeated his nearest rival, Srutinath Praharaj of the Communist Party of India (Marxist), by a margin of 12,000 votes. Later in January 2021, he resigned from two Trinamool party posts but remained as a primary member. However, he shifted to the Bharatiya Janata Party and contested the 2021 West Bengal Legislative Assembly election on the BJP ticket. He polled 57,889 votes and lost to Kanchan Mullick of the Trinamool Congress, by a margin of 35,989 votes. Mullick, a first timer, polled 93,878 votes.
