= Ramendra De =

Indian politician

Member of the Assam Legislative Assembly
- In office 1978–1983
- Preceded by: Moulana Abdul Jalil Choudhury
- Succeeded by: Gulam Subhany Choudhury
- Constituency: Badarpur
- In office 1985–1991
- Preceded by: Gulam Subhany Choudhury
- Succeeded by: Abu Saleh Najmuddin
- Constituency: Badarpur

Personal details
- Party: Communist Party of India (Marxist)

Ramendra De is an Indian politician. He was elected to the Assam Legislative Assembly from Badarpur in the 1978 and 1985 Assam Legislative Assembly election as a member of the Communist Party of India (Marxist).
