= Jangipara Assembly constituency =

Jangipara
- Constituency No. 195 for the West Bengal Legislative Assembly
- Interactive Map Outlining Jangipara Assembly Constituency

Constituency details
- Country: India
- Region: East India
- State: West Bengal
- District: Hooghly
- Lok Sabha constituency: Sreerampur
- Established: 1957
- Total electors: 203,355
- Reservation: None

Member of Legislative Assembly
- 18th West Bengal Legislative Assembly
- Incumbent Prosenjit Bag
- Party: BJP
- Alliance: NDA
- Elected year: 2026

Jangipara Assembly constituency is an assembly constituency in Hooghly district in the Indian state of West Bengal.

== Overview ==
As per orders of the Delimitation Commission, No. 195 Jangipara Assembly constituency is composed of the following: Jangipara community development block and Ainya, Haripur, Masat and Shiyakhala gram panchayata of Chanditala I community development block.

Jangipara Assembly constituency is part of No. 27 Sreerampur Lok Sabha constituency.

== Members of the Legislative Assembly ==
Year	Name	Party
1957	Biswanath Saha	Indian National Congress
1957	Kanai Dey	Indian National Congress
1962	Biswanath Saha	Indian National Congress
1967	Manindranath Jana	Communist Party of India (Marxist)
1969	Manindranath Jana	Communist Party of India (Marxist)
1971	Manindranath Jana	Communist Party of India (Marxist)
1972	Ganesh Hatui	Indian National Congress
1977	Ganesh Chandra Hatui	Indian National Congress
1982	Ganesh Chandra Hatui	Indian National Congress
1987	Dwipen Mukherjee	Indian National Congress
1991	Manindranath Jana	Communist Party of India (Marxist)
1996	Ibha Dey	Communist Party of India (Marxist)
2001	Ibha Dey	Communist Party of India (Marxist)
2006	Sudarsan Ray Chaudhuri	Communist Party of India (Marxist)
2011	Snehasis Chakraborty	Trinamool Congress
2016	Snehasis Chakraborty	Trinamool Congress
2021	Snehasis Chakraborty	Trinamool Congress
2026	Prosenjit Bag	Bharatiya Janata Party

== Election results ==
=== 2026 ===
2026 West Bengal Legislative Assembly election: Jangipara
Party	Candidate	Votes	%	±%
BJP	Prosenjit Bag	102,409	44.09	▲4.19
AITC	Snehasis Chakraborty	101,547	43.72	▼4.7
CPI(M)	Sudipto Sarkar	18,138	7.81	▼30.92
RSMP	Sekh Abdul Rahim	2,567	1.11	New entry
INC	Subhasis Dutta	1,572	0.68	
NOTA	None of the above	2,388	1.03	▼0.41
Majority		862	0.37	▼8.15
Turnout		232,291	92.49	▲10.63
BJP gain from AITC		Swing		

=== 2021 ===
2021 West Bengal Legislative Assembly election: Jangipara
Party	Candidate	Votes	%	±%
AITC	Snehasis Chakraborty	101,885	48.42	▼2.38
BJP	Debjit Sarkar	83,959	39.9	▲32.88
ISF	Sheikh Mainuddin	17,756	8.44	New entry
NOTA	None of the above	3,040	1.44	▼0.01
Majority		17,926	8.52	▼3.55
Turnout		210,411	81.86	▼1.57
AITC hold		Swing		

=== 2016 ===
2016 West Bengal Legislative Assembly election: Jangipara
Party	Candidate	Votes	%	±%
AITC	Snehasis Chakraborty	99,324	50.80	▲0.26
CPI(M)	Pobitra Singha Roy	75,719	38.73	▼4.22
BJP	Prosenjit Bag	13,716	7.02	▲3.74
NOTA	None of the Above	2,826	1.45	New entry
IUC	Kamaruzzaman Khandokar	2,516	1.29	New entry
Independent	Kaushik Kishore Roy	1,414	0.72	New entry
Majority		23,605	12.07	▲4.48
Turnout		1,95,515	83.43	▼1.31
AITC hold		Swing		

=== 2011 ===
2011 West Bengal Legislative Assembly election: Jangipara
Party	Candidate	Votes	%	±%
AITC	Snehasis Chakraborty	87,133	50.54	
CPI(M)	Sudarshan Ray Chaudhuri	74,057	42.95	
BJP	Prosenjit Bag	5,663	3.28	
PDCI	Pradip Ghosh	2,143	1.24	
Independent	Mohammad Kutubuddin	1,427	0.83	
JDP	Bharati Kisku	1,149	0.67	
Independent	Tarun Kumar Bank	837	0.49	
Majority		13,076	7.59	
Turnout		1,72,409	84.74	
AITC gain from CPI(M)		Swing		

=== 2006 ===
2006 West Bengal Legislative Assembly election: Jangipara
Party	Candidate	Votes	%	±%
CPI(M)	Sudarsan Raychaudhuri	79,418	57.57	
AITC	Ehsanul Haque Kazi (Badsha)	50,645	36.71	
INC	Subhas Dey	7,878	5.71	
Majority		28,773	20.86	
Turnout				
CPI(M) hold		Swing		

=== 2001 ===
2001 West Bengal Legislative Assembly election: Jangipara
Party	Candidate	Votes	%	±%
CPI(M)	Ibha Dey	65,575	49.53	
AITC	Shahzabin Khan Munshi	59,278	44.77	
BJP	Shri Amiya Ghosh	5,607	4.23	
PDS	Rajesh Das	1,937	1.46	
Majority		6,297	4.76	
Turnout		132,510	77.87	
CPI(M) hold		Swing		

=== 1996 ===
1996 West Bengal Legislative Assembly election: Jangipara
Party	Candidate	Votes	%	±%
CPI(M)	Ibha Dey	65,269	50.90	
INC	Dwipen Mukherjee	57,171	44.58	
BJP	Kanai Lal Halder	5,518	4.30	
Independent	Joydeb Chattopadhyay	276	0.22	
Majority		8,098	6.32	
Turnout		130,083	84.84	
CPI(M) hold		Swing		

=== 1991 ===
1991 West Bengal Legislative Assembly election: Jangipara
Party	Candidate	Votes	%	±%
CPI(M)	Manindra Jana	62,733	57.77	
INC	Gyatri Roy	32,268	29.72	
BJP	Gopi Nath Dey	13,272	12.22	
Independent	Tapan Chatterjee	314	0.29	
Majority		30,465	28.05	
Turnout		110,498	79.10	
CPI(M) hold		Swing		

=== 1987 ===
1987 West Bengal Legislative Assembly election: Jangipara
Party	Candidate	Votes	%	±%
CPI(M)	Manindar Nath Jana	53,181	55.63	
INC	Dwipendar Mukherjee	41,506	43.42	
BJP	Gopi Nath Dey	906	0.95	
Majority		11,675	12.21	
Turnout		96,887	80.26	
CPI(M) hold		Swing		

=== 1982 ===
1982 West Bengal Legislative Assembly election: Jangipara
Party	Candidate	Votes	%	±%
CPI(M)	Manindra Nath Jana	46,256	58.44	
INC	Ganesh Chandra Hatui	32,897	41.56	
Majority		13,359	16.88	
Turnout		80,752	78.75	
CPI(M) hold		Swing		

=== 1977 ===
1977 West Bengal Legislative Assembly election: Jangipara
Party	Candidate	Votes	%	±%
CPI(M)	Manindra Nath Jana	32,738	61.38	
INC	Ganesh Chandraj Hatui	13,099	24.56	
JP	Murari Mohan Kundu	7,502	14.06	
Majority		19,639	36.82	
Turnout		54,156	61.72	
Swing to CPI(M) from INC		Swing		

=== 1972 ===
1972 West Bengal Legislative Assembly election: Jangipara
Party	Candidate	Votes	%	±%
INC	Ganesh Hatui	23,939	51.57	
CPI(M)	Manindra Nath Jana	22,485	48.43	
Majority		1,454	3.14	
Turnout		47,606	63.92	
Swing to INC from CPI(M)		Swing		

=== 1971 ===
1971 West Bengal Legislative Assembly election: Jangipara
Party	Candidate	Votes	%	±%
CPI(M)	Manindra Nath Jana	22,677	48.96	
INC	Ganesh Hatui	13,926	30.07	
Bangla Congress	Sanatan Bhar	5,433	11.73	
CPI	Sushil Chattopadhyaya	4,278	9.24	
Majority		8,751	18.89	
Turnout		49,582	67.47	
CPI(M) hold		Swing		

=== 1969 ===
1969 West Bengal Legislative Assembly election: Jangipara
Party	Candidate	Votes	%	±%
CPI(M)	Maninda Nath Jana	27,841	57.64	
INC	Kanai Lall Dev	19,586	40.55	
NDF	Bholanath Sinha Roy	872	1.81	
Majority		8,255	17.09	
Turnout		49,630	70.46	
CPI(M) hold		Swing		

=== 1967 ===
1967 West Bengal Legislative Assembly election: Jangipara
Party	Candidate	Votes	%	±%
CPI(M)	M. N. Jana	20,111	44.15	
INC	K. L. Dey	18,981	41.67	
Bangla Congress	S. Bhar	6,457	14.18	
Majority		1,130	2.48	
Turnout		48,085	69.12	
Swing to CPI(M) from INC		Swing		

=== 1962 ===
1962 West Bengal Legislative Assembly election: Jangipara (SC)
Party	Candidate	Votes	%	±%
INC	Biswanath Saha	16,905	47.46	
CPI	Mahadeb Sabui	15,348	43.09	
Independent	Ganesh Chandra Pandit	2,146	6.03	
PSP	Samir Biswas	1,217	3.42	
Majority		1,557	4.37	
Turnout		37,521	54.87	
INC hold		Swing		

=== 1957 ===
1957 West Bengal Legislative Assembly election: Jangipara (SC)
Party	Candidate	Votes	%	±%
INC	Biswanath Saha	28,044	25.34	
INC	Kanai Dey	25,982	23.48	
CPI	Sourendra Nath Saha	24,020	21.71	
PSP	Sailendra Prasad Ghose	14,129	12.77	
HM	Manoj Sarbadhikari	9,520	8.60	
Independent	Hafizuddin	7,634	6.90	
Independent	Samir Kumar Biswas	1,329	1.20	
Majority		2,062	1.86	
Turnout		110,658	92.57	
INC win (new seat)				
