= Uttarpara Assembly constituency =

Constituency of the West Bengal Legislative Assembly, in India

Uttarpara
- Constituency No. 185 for the West Bengal Legislative Assembly
- Interactive Map Outlining Uttarpara Assembly Constituency

Constituency details
- Country: India
- Region: East India
- State: West Bengal
- District: Hooghly
- Lok Sabha constituency: Sreerampur
- Established: 1951
- Total electors: 216,312
- Reservation: None

Member of Legislative Assembly
- 18th West Bengal Legislative Assembly
- Incumbent Dipanjan Chakraborty
- Party: BJP
- Alliance: NDA
- Elected year: 2026

Uttarpara Assembly constituency is an assembly constituency in Hooghly district in the Indian state of West Bengal.

Most Successful parties from Uttarpara Assembly Constituency Since 1951
1. CPI(M) (11 times) (57.9%)
2. AITC (4 times) (21.1%)
3. CPI (3 times) (15.8%)
4. BJP (1 time) (5.26%)

== Overview ==
As per orders of the Delimitation Commission, No. 185 Uttarpara Assembly constituency is composed of the following: Uttarpara Kotrung Municipality, Konnagar Municipality and Nabagram, Kanaipur, Raghunathpur gram panchayats of Sreerampur Uttarpara community development block.

Uttarpara Assembly constituency is part of No. 27 Sreerampur Lok Sabha constituency.

== Members of the Legislative Assembly ==
Year	Name	Party
1951	Manoranjan Hazra	Communist Party of India
1957	Manoranjan Hazra	Communist Party of India
1962	Manoranjan Hazra	Communist Party of India
1967	Manoranjan Hazra	Communist Party of India (Marxist)
1969	Manoranjan Hazra	Communist Party of India (Marxist)
1971	Santasri Chatterjee	Communist Party of India (Marxist)
1972	Santasri Chatterjee	Communist Party of India (Marxist)
1977	Santasri Chatterjee	Communist Party of India (Marxist)
1982	Santasri Chatterjee	Communist Party of India (Marxist)
1987	Santasri Chatterjee	Communist Party of India (Marxist)
1991	Santasri Chatterjee	Communist Party of India (Marxist)
1996	Jyoti Krishna Chattopadhyay	Communist Party of India (Marxist)
2001	Swaraj Mukherjee	Trinamool Congress
2003^	Jyoti Krishna Chattopadhyay	Communist Party of India (Marxist)
2006	Srutinath Praharaj	Communist Party of India (Marxist)
2011	Anup Ghoshal	Trinamool Congress
2016	Prabir Kumar Ghosal	Trinamool Congress
2021	Kanchan Mullick	Trinamool Congress
2026	Dipanjan Chakraborty	Bharatiya Janata Party

- ^ by-election

== Election results ==
Vote share of Winning candidates
2026	39.24%
2021	46.96%
2016	44.89%
2011	59.77%
2006	48.44%
2003 by-poll	0.00%
2001	48.26%
1996	48.84%
1991	46.23%
1987	52.78%
1982	59.73%
1977	63.98%
1972	50.01%
1971	56.09%
1969	61.21%
1967	47.39%
1962	52.84%
1957	56.66%
1951	52.40%

=== 2026 ===
2026 West Bengal Legislative Assembly election: Uttarpara
Party	Candidate	Votes	%	±%
BJP	Dipanjan Chakraborty	80,612	39.24	▲10.28
AITC	Sirsanya Bandopadhyay	70,197	34.17	▼12.79
CPI(M)	Minakshi Mukherjee	49,820	24.25	▲2.88
INC	Subrata Mukhopadhyay	1,764	0.84	New entry
NOTA	None of the above	1,722	0.84	▼0.84
Majority		10,415	5.07	▼12.93
Turnout		205,454	89.88	▲12.94
BJP gain from AITC		Swing		

=== 2021 ===
2021 West Bengal Legislative Assembly election: Uttarpara
Party	Candidate	Votes	%	±%
AITC	Kanchan Mullick	93,878	46.96	▲2.07
BJP	Prabir Kumar Ghosal	57,889	28.96	▲16.44
CPI(M)	Rajat Banerjee	42,718	21.37	▼17.18
NOTA	None of the above	3,353	1.68	▼0.67
Majority		35,989	18.0	▲11.66
Turnout		199,894	76.94	▼1.17
AITC hold		Swing		

=== 2016 ===
2016 West Bengal Legislative Assembly election: Uttarpara
Party	Candidate	Votes	%	±%
AITC	Prabir Kumar Ghosal	84,918	44.89	▼14.88
CPI(M)	Srutinath Praharaj	72,918	38.55	▲3.43
BJP	Krishna Bhattacharjee	23,687	12.52	▲9.00
NOTA	None of the Above	4,444	2.35	New entry
CPI(ML)L	Swapan Majumdar	1,730	0.91	New entry
Independent	Suvendu Biswas	1,458	0.77	New entry
Majority		12,000	6.34	▼18.31
Turnout		1,89,155	78.11	▼2.62
AITC hold		Swing		

=== 2011 ===
2011 West Bengal Legislative Assembly election: Uttarpara
Party	Candidate	Votes	%	±%
AITC	Anup Ghosal	104,753	59.77	
CPI(M)	Srutinath Praharaj	61,560	35.12	
BJP	Pranab Chakraborty	6,161	3.52	
JD(U)	Rishikesh Singh	2,794	1.59	
Majority		43,193	24.65	
Turnout		1,75,268	80.73	
AITC gain from CPI(M)		Swing		

=== 2006 ===
2006 West Bengal Legislative Assembly election: Uttarpara
Party	Candidate	Votes	%	±%
CPI(M)	Prof. Dr. Srutinath Praharaj	73,149	48.44	
AITC	Sudipta Roy	72,264	47.86	
LJP	Rama Chakraborty	2,802	1.86	
IND	Sibaji Guha	2,784	1.84	
Majority		885	0.58	
Turnout		150,999		
CPI(M) hold		Swing		

=== 2001 ===
2001 West Bengal Legislative Assembly election: Uttarpara
Party	Candidate	Votes	%	±%
AITC	Prof. Swaraj Mukherjee	71,699	48.26	
CPI(M)	Jyoti Krishna Chattopadhyay	69,931	47.07	
BJP	Prabir Sinha	6,943	4.67	
Majority		1,768	1.19	
Turnout		148,744	69.98	
Swing to AITC from CPI(M)		Swing		

=== 1996 ===
1996 West Bengal Legislative Assembly election: Uttarpara
Party	Candidate	Votes	%	±%
CPI(M)	Jyoti Krishna Chattapadhyay	75,680	48.84	
INC	Pabitra Gupta	69,929	45.13	
BJP	Radha Bhaumik	8,298	5.36	
IND	Prabir Kundu	728	0.47	
IND	Surendra Prosad	318	0.21	
Majority		5,751	3.71	
Turnout		158,465	78.68	
CPI(M) hold		Swing		

=== 1991 ===
1991 West Bengal Legislative Assembly election: Uttarpara
Party	Candidate	Votes	%	±%
CPI(M)	Santasir Chatterjee	58,066	46.23	
INC	Jagat Chatterjee	53,329	42.46	
BJP	Krishna Bhattacharyya	12,207	9.72	
IND	Amar Kumar Sen	1,660	1.32	
DDP	Babu Ram Majhi	327	0.26	
Majority		4,737	3.77	
Turnout		128,218	72.55	
CPI(M) hold		Swing		

=== 1987 ===
1987 West Bengal Legislative Assembly election: Uttarpara
Party	Candidate	Votes	%	±%
CPI(M)	Santashri Chatterjee	57,182	52.78	
INC	Jagat Chatterjee	49,757	45.93	
IND	Nimai Mukherjee	887	0.82	
IND	Bishnudev Tripathi	516	0.48	
Majority		7,425	6.85	
Turnout		110,381	72.83	
CPI(M) hold		Swing		

=== 1982 ===
1982 West Bengal Legislative Assembly election: Uttarpara
Party	Candidate	Votes	%	±%
CPI(M)	Santasri Chattapadhyay	50,127	59.73	
INC	Sukumar Ghosh	28,108	33.49	
IND	Amar Pal Sen (Paltu)	4,334	5.16	
JP	Kashi Nath Banerjee	1,353	1.61	
Majority		22,019	26.24	
Turnout		85,985	71.56	
CPI(M) hold		Swing		

=== 1977 ===
1977 West Bengal Legislative Assembly election: Uttarpara
Party	Candidate	Votes	%	±%
CPI(M)	Santashree Chattopadhyay	36,434	63.98	
JP	Kashinath Banerjee	10,770	18.91	
IND	Alok Roy	9,373	16.46	
IND	Murali Singh	373	0.65	
Majority		25,664	45.07	
Turnout		57,917	63.25	
CPI(M) hold		Swing		

=== 1972 ===
1972 West Bengal Legislative Assembly election: Uttarpara
Party	Candidate	Votes	%	±%
CPI(M)	Santasri Chattopadhyay	27,053	50.01	
CPI	Gobida Chatterjee	27,045	49.99	
Majority		8	0.02	
Turnout		55,619	64.71	
CPI(M) hold		Swing		

=== 1971 ===
1971 West Bengal Legislative Assembly election: Uttarpara
Party	Candidate	Votes	%	±%
CPI(M)	Santosri Chattopadhyay	29,473	56.09	
CPI	Gobinda Chatterji	17,022	32.40	
INC(O)	Kasinath Banerjee	6,048	11.51	
Majority		12,451	23.69	
Turnout		54,760	63.97	
CPI(M) hold		Swing		

=== 1969 ===
1969 West Bengal Legislative Assembly election: Uttarpara
Party	Candidate	Votes	%	±%
CPI(M)	Monoranjan Hazra	33,070	61.21	
INC	N. N. Mukhopadhya	19,974	36.97	
ABJS	Panchkari Bhatacharjya	987	1.83	
Majority		13,096	24.24	
Turnout		55,189	71.14	
CPI(M) hold		Swing		

=== 1967 ===
1967 West Bengal Legislative Assembly election: Uttarpara
Party	Candidate	Votes	%	±%
CPI(M)	Monoranjan Hazra	24,618	47.39	
INC	M. M. Mitra	20,195	38.88	
CPI	G. Bandyipadhaya	6,066	11.68	
IND	P. Bhattacharjya	1,067	2.05	
Majority		4,423	8.51	
Turnout		53,669	74.37	
Swing to CPI(M) from CPI		Swing		

=== 1962 ===
1962 West Bengal Legislative Assembly election: Uttarpara
Party	Candidate	Votes	%	±%
CPI	Monoranjan Hazra	25,033	52.84	
INC	Subrata Kumar Dinda	20,738	43.77	
HM	Mohit Kumar Singha Roy	1,607	3.39	
Majority		4,295	9.07	
Turnout		48,898	62.15	
CPI hold		Swing		

=== 1957 ===
1957 West Bengal Legislative Assembly election: Uttarpara
Party	Candidate	Votes	%	±%
CPI	Monoranjan Hazra	20,745	56.66	
INC	Bishnu Charan Banerjee	14,371	39.25	
HM	Anup Krishna Mukhopadhyay	1,494	4.08	
Majority		6,374	17.41	
Turnout		36,610	58.65	
CPI hold		Swing		

=== 1951 ===
1951 West Bengal Legislative Assembly election: Uttarpara
Party	Candidate	Votes	%	±%
CPI	Monoranjan Hazra	16,568	52.40	
INC	Amarnath Mukhopadhyay	10,812	34.19	
IND	Saileswar Mitra	1,565	4.95	
IND	Hrishikesh Chattopadhyay	1,324	4.19	
IND	Amarendra Adak	589	1.86	
FBL(MG)	Satyapriya Bandyopadhyay	388	1.23	
KMPP	Sanat Kumar Gupta	374	1.18	
Majority		5,756	18.21	
Turnout		31,620	46.43	
CPI win (new seat)				
