= Akbar Ali Khondkar =

Indian politician

Akbar Ali Khandoker

Member of the Indian Parliament for Serampore
- In office 1998–2004
- Preceded by: Pradip Bhattacharya
- Succeeded by: Santasri Chatterjee

Member of the West Bengal Legislative Assembly for Chanditala
- In office 1996–1998
- Preceded by: Malin Ghosh
- Succeeded by: Bhaktaram Pan

President of Hooghly District Trinamool Congress
- In office 1 Jan 1998 – 24 April 2005
- Succeeded by: Tapan Dasgupta

Personal details
- Born: 2 January 1957 Chanditala, Dist. Serampore (West Bengal)
- Died: 24 April 2005 (Aged 48) New Delhi
- Party: All India Trinamool Congress (1998-2005) Indian National Congress (before 1998)
- Spouse: Swati Khandoker
- Children: 1 Son, 1 Daughter

Janab Akbar Ali Khondkar (Bengali: আকবর আলী খন্দকার) (2 January 1957 – 24 April 2005) was a Member of Parliament (MP) in the Twelfth Lok Sabha & Thirteenth Lok Sabha of India. He was elected from his Lok Sabha Constituency in Serampore, West Bengal in 1998 and 1999 under All India Trinamool Congress Ticket.
