= Nandigram in the 2021 West Bengal Legislative Assembly election =

Controversy regarding the election in Nandigram

Assembly election in Nandigram as a part of 2021 West Bengal Legislative Assembly election
- Thursday, 1 April 2021
- Turnout: 88.01% (▲1.04%)

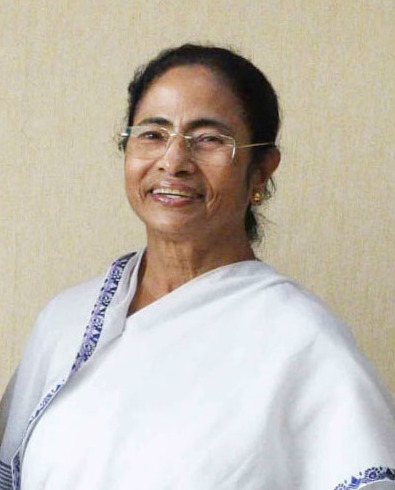

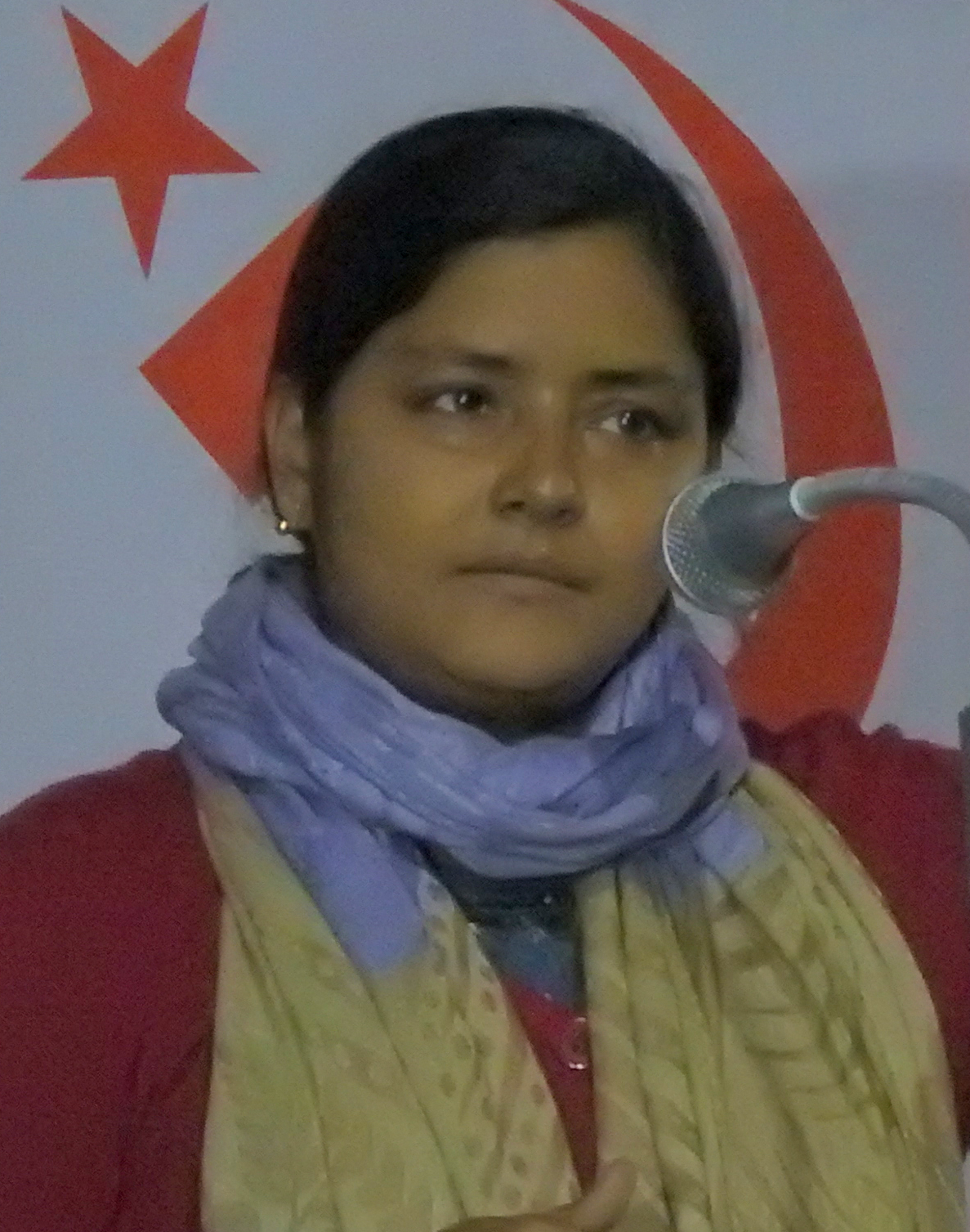
	Majority party	Minority party	Third party
Candidate	Suvendu Adhikari	Mamata Banerjee	Minakshi Mukherjee
Party	BJP	AITC	CPI(M)
Alliance	NDA	AITC+	LF
Leader's seat	Did not contest (Note: Other than Nandigram)	Bhabanipur (by- elected) (Note: Other than Nandigram) (Note: She was elected months after her defeat in Nandigram, since she had become the Chief minister, and she had to become a member of the house within 6 months of assuming the post, as per the law)	Did not contest (Note: Other than Nandigram)
Popular vote	110,764	108,808	6,267
Percentage	48.49 %	47.64 %	2.34 %
MLA before election
Suvendu Adhikari (Note: Suvendu Adhiakri was a TMC MLA from the constituency from 2016 until December 2020, when he resigned from the Legislative Assembly and joined the BJP. The seat remained vacant since then.)
TMC
Elected MLA
Suvendu Adhikari
BJP

Nandigram
- Vidhan Sabha constituency
- Location within West Bengal
- Coordinates: 22°01′N 87°59′E
- Country: India
- State: West Bengal
- District: Purba Medinipur
- Constituency No.: 210
- Type: Open
- Lok Sabha constituency: Tamluk
- Electorate (year): 196,158 (2011) 257,156 (2021)

An Assembly election for the Nandigram Vidhan Sabha constituency in the Indian state of West Bengal was held on 1 April 2021, as part of the 2021 West Bengal Legislative Assembly election for 292 constituencies out of the 294 constituencies. (Note: The election for all 292 constituency took place between 27 March and 29 April 2021 in eight phases. Voting for the remaining two constituencies was postponed until 16 May) On 2 May, the results were announced, and Suvendu Adhikari defeated Mamata Banerjee by a total 1956 votes.

== Background ==
=== Electoral system and political shifts ===
The West Bengal Legislative Assembly functions as a unicameral body under Article 168 of the Constitution of India. Members are directly elected for a five-year term unless the assembly is dissolved earlier. The political landscape of West Bengal underwent a sea change leading up to 2021. In the 2019 general elections, the BJP made significant inroads, securing 18 of the state's 42 Lok Sabha seats and capturing 40 percent of the vote share. This surge was bolstered by a steady stream of defections from the ruling Trinamool Congress (TMC), as well as the Congress and Left parties. Political analysts attributed the BJP's meteoric rise to a massive consolidation of opposition votes. Specifically, the Left Front's traditional support base drifted decisively toward the BJP, driven by a strategic intent to challenge the TMC. (Note: This realignment was often summarized by locals with the sentiment, "This time Rama (referring to the BJP's 'Jay Shree Ram' slogan), next time Left.") Even Mamata Banerjee acknowledged this shift, remarking that "CPM's harmads are all in BJP now," while Suvendu Adhikari confirmed on polling day that the region's old Leftists were rallying behind him.

== Election campaign ==
The campaign for Nandigram was a high-stakes battle characterized by intense political maneuvering and volatile rhetoric. On 18 January, Mamata Banerjee announced her decision to contest the seat, a challenge immediately accepted by her former aide turned rival, Suvendu Adhikari, who vowed to quit politics if he did not defeat the Chief Minister by at least 50,000 votes. Adhikari's campaign heavily emphasized demographic distinctiveness, a strategy media outlets described as an attempt to consolidate the Hindu vote. The contest took a dramatic turn on 10 March when Banerjee, after filing her nomination, sustained injuries at the Birulia market. She alleged a conspiracy involving "four-five people" who she claimed pushed her, leading to her hospitalization in Kolkata. While BJP leaders, including Subramanian Swamy, extended wishes for her recovery, the incident sparked a political firestorm. Banerjee released a video message urging calm and was subsequently discharged to campaign from a wheelchair. The Election Commission reviewed reports from local authorities and eyewitnesses regarding the incident, which occurred amidst a chaotic crowd. As the election heated up, external groups intervened; the Samyukt Kisan Morcha urged locals to vote against the BJP, while Yashwant Sinha joined the TMC, citing the "attack" on Banerjee as his tipping point to help "save democracy." Legal and procedural skirmishes followed. Adhikari demanded the rejection of Banerjee's nomination over alleged suppression of criminal cases in her affidavit—a claim the TMC refuted as a case of mistaken identity. In a tit-for-tat move, the TMC sought the cancellation of Adhikari's nomination, questioning his residency status. Tensions on the ground escalated into violence. Adhikari faced protests from local groups, while clashes between TMC and BJP workers left several injured. Trinamool leaders lodged multiple complaints with the Election Commission, alleging that Adhikari was harboring "outsiders" and miscreants to disrupt the polls, an accusation the opposition denied. The situation remained volatile with reports of bombings and protests. Adhikari, however, remained confident, citing surveys predicting his victory. On the eve of the election, the EC imposed Section 144 and transferred key police officers to ensure fair play. Controversy erupted over a viral audio clip of Sisir Adhikari seeking support for his son from a TMC functionary, and police made arrests related to bomb supplies. Polling day on 1 April was marred by sporadic violence, mutual allegations of booth obstruction, and "go back" slogans directed at Adhikari. Clashes continued even after the polls closed. Later, the EC issued a warning to Adhikari regarding a speech containing references to a "Begum," which opponents labeled as communal, though Adhikari maintained he had made no personal attacks.

== Election results ==
=== 2021 ===
In the 2021 elections, Suvendu Adhikari of Bharatiya Janata Party defeated his nearest rival Mamata Banerjee of Trinamool Congress.

2021 West Bengal Legislative Assembly election: Nandigram
Party	Candidate	Votes	%	±%
BJP	Suvendu Adhikari	110,764	48.49	
AITC	Mamata Banerjee	1,08,808	47.64	
CPI(M)	Minakshi Mukherjee	6,267	2.74	
SUCI(C)	Manoj Kumar Das	240	0.11	
Independent		1,236	0.54	
NOTA	None of the Above	1,090	0.48	−0.15
Majority		1,956	0.85	−39.75
Turnout		2,28,467	88.55	+1.58
BJP gain from AITC		Swing		

West Bengal Legislative Assembly elections, 2021 Purba Medinipur district summary
Party	Seats won	Seat change
Trinamool Congress	9	▼4
Bharatiya Janata Party	7	▲7
Communist Party of India (Marxist)	0	▼2
Communist Party of India	0	▼1

== Events on counting day ==
The vote counting on 2 May turned into a nail-biting thriller, with all eyes fixed on the high-voltage Nandigram constituency. The process, scheduled for 17 rounds, was marred by server glitches and delays, creating an atmosphere of confusion. Although Mamata Banerjee trailed in the initial rounds, the narrative briefly shifted during the 16th round counting of the Gokulnagar panchayat area, leading to premature reports of her victory. However, following a significant delay in the 17th round involving postal ballots, the Election Commission officially declared that Suvendu Adhikari had defeated the Chief Minister by 1,956 votes. The valid vote count stood at 228,405, and despite the tense atmosphere and beefed-up security at the Haldia counting centre, the BJP candidate emerged victorious in this prestige battle. While the Trinamool Congress (TMC) swept the state, Adhikari's win in Nandigram was a significant outlier. Union Ministers Rajnath Singh and Nirmala Sitharaman publicly congratulated Banerjee on her party's state-level success, while local BJP leaders hailed Adhikari's specific triumph. Conversely, poll strategist Prashant Kishor, who had predicted the BJP would struggle to cross double digits, announced his exit from the profession, blaming the Election Commission for acting as an "extension of the BJP." Media confusion added to the chaos, with outlets like ANI initially reporting a Banerjee win before correcting the record. Banerjee's reaction was sharp. While she accepted the statewide mandate, claiming "Bengal saved the country," she vehemently rejected the Nandigram result, alleging fraud, "mafiagiri," and tampering. She claimed the Returning Officer had been threatened with suicide if he ordered a recount and criticized the Prime Minister for not calling her. The Election Commission, however, stood by the result, providing security to the officer and stating that recounting decisions lay solely with the Returning Officer; a TMC delegation demanding a recount was rebuffed.

Adhikari's victory was statistically notable given that the TMC swept the broader Medinipur region, winning 9 of 16 seats in East Midnapore and dominating neighboring districts. Interestingly, the BJP trailed in the specific booth where the Adhikari family cast their votes. Following the results, a leaked audio conversation surfaced involving Adhikari and a BJP worker, where Adhikari discussed the voting patterns of the Hindu community and the protection of his supporters, referring to "militants" he would shelter—a point of contention for his critics. The aftermath saw intensified political theatre. TMC workers staged dharnas in Haldia and Kolkata, demanding a recount and blocking Adhikari's vehicle. Tensions peaked when TMC activists identified unlocked trunks and uncounted EVMs at the Haldia counting centre, leading to police intervention and the eventual transfer of the machines to administrative custody under Central Force security. Adhikari's narrow but decisive victory turned Nandigram into a persistent bone of contention, leading Mamata Banerjee to challenge the result in the Calcutta High Court.

== Aftermath ==
=== Court proceedings ===
The electoral verdict of Nandigram quickly escalated into a legal tug-of-war. On 17 June, an election petition was filed before the Calcutta High Court on behalf of Mamata Banerjee, challenging Suvendu Adhikari's victory. The matter was initially listed before a single-judge bench of Justice Kaushik Chanda. During a brief hearing, the court dispensed with the petitioner's physical presence, citing Supreme Court precedents, but directed the administration to verify if the petition complied with the Representation of the People Act. However, the proceedings hit an immediate roadblock when Banerjee's counsel, Abhishek Singhvi, sought Justice Chanda's recusal, citing his past association with the BJP. This period saw a broader conflict between the ruling party and the judiciary. On 27 June, the Bar Council of West Bengal wrote to the Chief Justice of India (CJI) demanding the removal of Acting Chief Justice Rajesh Bindal, alleging partiality in cases involving the state, specifically mentioning the Narada and Nandigram matters. By September, the Supreme Court Collegium recommended transferring Justice Bindal to the Allahabad High Court and appointing Justice Prakash Shrivastava as the Chief Justice of Calcutta High Court, a transition completed in October. Meanwhile, on 7 July, Justice Chanda recused himself from the Nandigram case but not without imposing a ₹5 lakh penalty on Banerjee for the manner in which the recusal was sought. TMC leaders, including Sheikh Sufiyan, vowed to challenge the penalty in the Supreme Court. The wave of litigation was not confined to Nandigram. Multiple defeated TMC candidates filed petitions, including Alo Rani Sarkar (Bangaon South, lost by 2,004 votes), Manas Mazumder (Goghat, lost by 4,147 votes), Sangram Dolui (Moyna, lost by 1,260 votes), and Shantiram Mahato (Balarampur, lost by 423 votes). The High Court directed the preservation of all polling documents in these cases. Conversely, BJP candidates also challenged results: Kalyan Chaubey contested the Maniktala verdict (lost by approx. 20,000 votes), and Jitendra Tiwari challenged the Pandabeswar result, which the court admitted in July. In Alo Rani Sarkar's case, allegations surfaced regarding central forces influencing voters and false affidavits by the winning BJP candidate, matters the court set for verification.

Following Justice Chanda's recusal, the Nandigram case was assigned to Justice Shampa Sarkar. On 14 July, the High Court issued notices to Suvendu Adhikari and the Election Commission to preserve all records. Adhikari, however, moved the Supreme Court seeking the transfer of the case outside West Bengal, a move that led the High Court to adjourn hearings repeatedly from August through November to await the apex court's decision. Throughout this period, Banerjee continued to publicly allege rigging, claiming at rallies in September that VVPATs were not counted and machines were crushed. By mid-November, the legal battle intensified. Adhikari appealed to the High Court to adjourn proceedings pending the Supreme Court's ruling, a stance opposed by the Advocate General. The High Court directed Adhikari to submit a written statement by 29 November explaining his lack of confidence in the state judiciary. Simultaneously, Supreme Court hearings were delayed due to scheduling issues, though Justice Hima Kohli remarked to Adhikari's counsel that presuming the High Court would be unfair was "misconceived." The legal gridlock continued into the new year. Adhikari submitted his statement in December, and on 3 January 2022, the Supreme Court ordered a 14-day stay on the transfer appeal. Amidst the legal maneuvering, expelled BJP leader Surajit Saha controversially claimed that the party had deployed men from Howrah to Nandigram to secure Adhikari's victory, adding further fuel to the political fire.

== See also ==
- 2016–21 West Bengal Legislative Assembly by-elections
- 2016 West Bengal Legislative Assembly
- 2021 elections in India
- 2019 Indian general election in West Bengal
- 2018 West Bengal Panchayat elections
- 2018 Tripura Legislative Assembly election
