= Kalyan Banerjee (politician) =

Indian politician (born 1957)

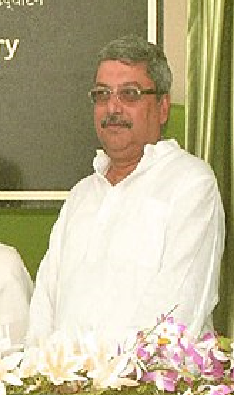
- Kalyan Banerjee 2012

Chairman of HRBC
- In office 26 November 2020 – 7 May 2026
- Preceded by: Suvendu Adhikari

Member of Parliament, Lok Sabha
- Incumbent
- Assumed office 16 May 2009
- Preceded by: Santasri Chatterjee
- Constituency: Sreerampur

Member of West Bengal Legislative Assembly
- In office 13 May 2001 – 11 May 2006
- Preceded by: Tapas Banerjee
- Succeeded by: Prativa Ranjan Mukherjee
- Constituency: Asansol Uttar

Personal details
- Born: 4 January 1957 (age 69) Bankura, West Bengal, India
- Party: Trinamool Congress
- Other political affiliations: Indian National Congress
- Spouse: Smt. Chhabi Banerjee
- Children: 2
- Education: Bankura Sammilani College, Bankura (B.Com) Chatanagpur Law College, Ranchi (LL.B)
- Profession: Lawyer

Kalyan Banerjee (Bengali: কল্যাণ বন্দ্যোপাধ্যায়; born 4 January 1957) is an Indian politician and lawyer belonging to the Trinamool Congress. He is Senior Advocate of Supreme Court of India and Calcutta High Court. He is a four-time Member of Parliament. He has won the 2009, 2014, 2019 and 2024 Indian general elections from Sreerampur Lok Sabha constituency.

== Career ==
He was earlier elected for the 16th Lok Sabha from the same constituency.

Kalyan Banerjee's education qualification is B.Com. and LL.B. He is a well known advocate, who has been frequently taking up numerous cases for Trinamool Congress. He has been practicing in Calcutta High Court since 1981. Some of the cases he handled are of Rizwanur Rahman Case, matters relating to Nandigram, Chhota Angaria Case, Bhikari Paswan Case, Imposition of Sec-144 in Singur and different land acquisition cases.

== May 2026 attack ==
On 30 May 2026, a mob attacked TMC leader Abhishek Banerjee in Sonarpur in South 24 Parganas district. This incidence resulted in big political controversy, with Mamata Banerjee alleging BJP for this incidence, and BJP denying having any linkage to the given incidence.

On the next day, on 31 May 2026, Kalyan Banerjee was reportedly attacked in Chanditala, West Bengal in his own constituency. Banerjee was hit on his head with policemen standing there.

Two incidences of high profile attacks on two senior leaders of TMC led to huge political polarization in West Bengal, with the Indian National Developmental Inclusive Alliance (INDIA alliance), also coming in open support of Mamata Banerjee on these issues.

Meanwhile Mamata has announced public protest on 02 June against the attacks on Abhishek Banerjee and Kalyan Banerjee in rapid succession.

=== 2026 MPs Rebellion ===
Following the 2026 Assembly Elections, 20 out of the 28 Members of Parliament from Trinamool Congress decided to leave Mamata Banerjee and the Trinamool Congress. They formed a new group and decided to merge with a relatively little known National Party, the Nationalist Citizen Party of India and presented a representation in this regards to Lok Sabha Speaker Om Birla on 14 June 2026.

After this major split in the Trinamool Congress, only 8 Lok Sabha MPs remained loyal to Mamata Banerjee. The loyalist MPs included Abhishek Banerjee, Mahua Moitra, Saugata Roy, Kalyan Banerjee, Kirti Azad, Pratima Mondal and Sajda Ahmed.
