= Badarpur, Assam Assembly constituency =

Constituency of the Assam legislative assembly in India

Coordinates: 24.86°N 92.56°E

Badarpur
- Former constituency No. 5 for the Assam Legislative Assembly

Constituency details
- Country: India
- Region: Northeast India
- State: Assam
- District: Karimganj
- Established: 1951
- Abolished: 2023
- Reservation: None

Badarpur Assembly constituency was one of the 126 constituencies of the Legislative Assembly of Assam state in northeastern India. This constituency was abolished in 2023.

Badarpur (constituency number 5) was one of the 5 constituencies located in Barak Valley of Karimganj district. Badarpur was part of the Karimganj Lok Sabha constituency along with 7 other assembly segments, namely Patharkandi, Karimganj North, Karimganj South, Ratabari in Karimganj district, Hailakandi, Katlichera and Algapur in Hailakandi district.

== Members of Legislative Assembly ==
Year	Member	Party
1951	Moulana Abdul Jalil Choudhury	Indian National Congress
1957	Moulana Abdul Jalil Choudhury	Indian National Congress
1958	Bimala Prasad Chaliha	Indian National Congress
1962	Moulana Abdul Jalil Choudhury	Indian National Congress
1967	Moulana Abdul Jalil Choudhury	Indian National Congress
1972	Moulana Abdul Jalil Choudhury	Indian National Congress
1978	Ramendra De	Communist Party of India
1983	Gulam Subhany Choudhury	Indian National Congress
1985	Ramendra De	Communist Party of India
1991	Abu Saleh Najmuddin	Indian National Congress
1996	Abu Saleh Najmuddin	Indian National Congress
2001	Jamal Uddin Ahmed	All India Trinamool Congress
2006	Anwarul Hoque	All India United Democratic Front
2011	Jamal Uddin Ahmed	Indian National Congress
2016	Jamal Uddin Ahmed	Indian National Congress
2021	Abdul Aziz	All India United Democratic Front

== Election results ==
=== 2021 ===
Assam assembly elections, 2021: Badarpur
Party	Candidate	Votes	%	±%
AIUDF	Abdul Aziz	74,452	56.62	▲24.47
BJP	Biswarup Bhattacharjee	50,504	38.41	▲6.69
NOTA	None of the Above	1,706	1.3	▲0.78
Majority		23,948	18.21	▼16.36
Turnout		1,31,492	80.9	▼0.04
AIUDF gain from INC		Swing		

=== 2016 ===
2016 Assam Legislative Assembly election: Badarpur
Party	Candidate	Votes	%	±%
INC	Jamaluddin Ahmed	38,266	34.00	−5.16
AIUDF	Abdul Aziz	36,178	32.15	+1.05
BJP	Dipak Deb	35,694	31.72	+4.89
Independent	Sazidul Hoque	418	0.37	N/A
SP	Kamrul Islam	303	0.26	N/A
Independent	Subodh Suklabaidya	295	0.26	N/A
Independent	Oliour Rahman Tapadar	168	0.14	N/A
Independent	Solmon Shaikh	147	0.13	N/A
Independent	Abdus Sukkur Baig	142	0.12	N/A
Independent	Khasruzzaman Talukdar	132	0.11	N/A
Independent	Anamuddin	101	0.08	N/A
Independent	Binoy Namasudra	79	0.07	N/A
NOTA	None of the above	596	0.52	N/A
Majority		2,088	1.85	−6.21
Turnout		1,12,519	80.94	+8.93
Registered electors		1,39,003		
INC hold		Swing		

=== 2011 ===
2011 Assam Legislative Assembly election: Badarpur
Party	Candidate	Votes	%	±%
INC	Jamaluddin Ahmed	35,869	29.16	+11.25
AIUDF	Helaluddin Choudhury	28,487	31.10	−5.59
BJP	Biswarup Bhattacharjee	24,573	26.83	−3.31
AITC	Fakaruddin	1,194	1.30	N/A
Independent	Moinul Islam	837	0.91	N/A
NCP	Fakaruddin Ali Ahmed	644	0.70	N/A
Majority		7,382	8.06	+1.51
Turnout		91,604	72.01	+6.15
Registered electors		1,27,213		
INC gain from AIUDF		Swing		

=== 2006 ===
Assam Legislative Assembly election, 2006: Badarpur
Party	Candidate	Votes	%	±%
AIUDF	Anowarul Hoque	29,680	36.69	N/A
BJP	Biswarup Bhattacharjee	24,377	30.14	−7.95
INC	Jamaluddin Ahmed	22,573	27.91	+10.21
CPI(M)	Ramendra De	1,823	2.25	N/A
Independent	Abdul Khalique	1,081	1.34	N/A
Independent	Sukanti Bhattacharjee	715	0.88	N/A
Independent	Sambhu Kanti Namasudra	350	0.43	N/A
Independent	Khaliluddin	293	0.36	N/A
Majority		5,303	6.55	+4.01
Turnout		80,892	65.86	−4.18
Registered electors		1,22,828		
AIUDF gain from AITC		Swing		

=== 2001 ===
Assam Legislative Assembly election, 2001: Badarpur
Party	Candidate	Votes	%	±%
AITC	Jamaluddin Ahmed	30,471	40.63	
BJP	Dipak Deb	28,563	38.09	
INC	Abu Saleh Najmuddin	13,274	17.70	
Independent	Helaluddin	1,935	2.58	
Independent	Nilay Kanti Paul	567	0.76	
Independent	Abdur Rakib	101	0.13	
Independent	Abdur Raquib Choudhury	85	0.11	
Majority		1,908	2.54	
Turnout		74,996	70.04	
Registered electors		1,07,070		
AITC gain from INC		Swing		
