= Prosenjit Bag =

Indian politician in West Bengal

Member of the West Bengal Legislative Assembly
- Incumbent
- Assumed office 4 May 2026
- Preceded by: Snehasis Chakraborty
- Constituency: Jangipara

Personal details
- Party: Bharatiya Janata Party
- Parent: Paritosh Bag
- Occupation: Farmer
- Profession: Politician

Prosenjit Bag (Bengali: প্রসেনজিৎ বাগ) is an Indian politician from West Bengal. He is a member of West Bengal Legislative Assembly from Jangipara Assembly constituency in Hooghly district. He is a member of Bharatiya Janata Party.

== Early life and education ==
Ghosh is from Hooghly district of West Bengal. His completed Madhyamik from Borhal Kamaladebi Pratisthan and passed the examinationis conducted by the West Bengal Board of Secondary Education in 1992.

== Political career ==
Bag won the Jangipara Assembly constituency in the 2026 West Bengal Legislative Assembly election. He polled 1,02,409 votes and defeated his nearest rival, Snehasis Chakraborty of the All India Trinamool Congress, by a margin of 862 votes.

=== Electoral performance ===
West Bengal Legislative Assembly
Year	Constituency	Party	Votes	%	Opponent	Party	Votes	%	Margin	Result
2026	Jangipara	BJP	1,02,409	44.09	Snehasis Chakraborty	AITC	1,01,547	43.72	862	Won

== See also ==
- 2026 West Bengal Legislative Assembly election
- List of chief ministers of West Bengal
- West Bengal Legislative Assembly
