= Gulam Subhany Choudhury =

Indian politician

Member of the Assam Legislative Assembly
- In office 1983–1985
- Preceded by: Ramendra De
- Succeeded by: Ramendra De
- Constituency: Badarpur

Personal details
- Party: Indian National Congress

Gulam Subhany Choudhury is an Indian politician from the state of Assam. He was elected to the Assam Legislative Assembly from Badarpur in the 1983 Assam Legislative Assembly election as a member of the Indian National Congress.
