= Bimal Kanti Ghosh =

Indian politician (1924–1998)

Member of Parliament, Lok Sabha
- In office 1967–1971
- Preceded by: Dinendra Nath Bhattacharya
- Succeeded by: Dinendra Nath Bhattacharya
- In office 1984–1989
- Preceded by: Dinendra Nath Bhattacharya
- Succeeded by: Sudarsan Roy Choudhury
- Constituency: Serampore, West Bengal

Personal details
- Born: 5 April 1924 Paturia ,Faridpur district, Bengal Presidency, British India
- Died: 1 January 1998 (aged 73) Serampore, West Bengal, India
- Party: Indian National Congress

Bimal Kanti Ghosh (also spelt Bimalkanti; 5 April 1924 – 1 January 1998) was an Indian politician. He was elected to the Lok Sabha, the lower house of the Parliament of India from the Serampore constituency of West Bengal as a member of the Indian National Congress.

Kanti Ghosh died in Serampore on 1 January 1998, at the age of 73.
