= Bhabanipur, West Bengal Assembly constituency =

Legislative Assembly constituency in West Bengal, India

Bhabanipur
- Constituency No. 159 for the West Bengal Legislative Assembly
- Interactive Map Outlining Bhabanipur Assembly Constituency

Constituency details
- Country: India
- Region: East India
- State: West Bengal
- District: Kolkata
- Lok Sabha constituency: Kolkata Dakshin
- Established: 1951
- Total electors: 160,313 (2026)
- Reservation: None

Member of Legislative Assembly
- 18th West Bengal Legislative Assembly
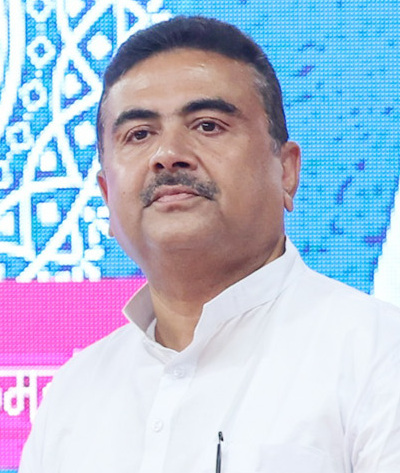
- Incumbent Suvendu Adhikari; Chief Minister of West Bengal
- Party: BJP
- Alliance: NDA
- Elected year: 2026
- Preceded by: Mamata Banerjee

Bhabanipur Assembly constituency is a Legislative Assembly constituency of Kolkata district in the Indian state of West Bengal.

== Overview ==
As per order of the Delimitation Commission in respect of the Delimitation of constituencies in West Bengal, Bhabanipur Assembly constituency is composed of the following:

- Ward Nos. 63, 70, 71, 72, 73, 74, 77 and 82 of Kolkata Municipal Corporation.

Borough	Ward No.	2021 winner		2026 Assembly leads
VII	63	Susmita Bhattacharya Chatterjee	Trinamool Congress	Bharatiya Janata Party
VIII	70	Ashim Kumar Bose	Trinamool Congress	Bharatiya Janata Party
IX	71	Papiya Singh	Trinamool Congress	Bharatiya Janata Party
VIII	72	Sandip Ranjan Bakshi	Trinamool Congress	Bharatiya Janata Party
IX	73	Kajari Banerjee	Trinamool Congress	Bharatiya Janata Party
IX	74	Debalina Biswas	Trinamool Congress	Bharatiya Janata Party
IX	77	Shamima Rehan Khan	Trinamool Congress	Trinamool Congress
IX	82	Firhad Hakim	Trinamool Congress	Bharatiya Janata Party

Bhabanipur Assembly constituency is part of No. 23 Kolkata Dakshin Lok Sabha constituency.

== Members of the Legislative Assembly ==
Year	Portrait	Name	Party
1952		Mira Datta Gupta	Indian National Congress
1957		Siddhartha Shankar Ray	Indian National Congress
1962		Siddhartha Shankar Ray	Independent
Constituency renamed as Kalighat
1967		Beva Mitra	Indian National Congress
1969		Sadhan Gupta	Communist Party of India (Marxist)
1971		Rathin Talukdar	Indian National Congress
1972		Rathin Talukdar	Indian National Congress
1977–2009: Constituency did not exist
2011		Subrata Bakshi	Trinamool Congress
2011^		Mamata Banerjee	Trinamool Congress
2016		Mamata Banerjee	Trinamool Congress
2021		Sovandeb Chattopadhyay	Trinamool Congress
2021^		Mamata Banerjee	Trinamool Congress
2026		Suvendu Adhikari	Bharatiya Janata Party

- ^ by-election

== Election results ==
Vote share of winning candidates
2026	53.02%
2021 (by-poll)	71.90%
2021	57.71%
2016	47.67%
2011 (by-poll)	77.46%
2011	64.77%

Victory Margin of winning candidates
2026	10.83%
2021 (by-poll)	49.61%
2021	22.55%
2016	18.41%
2011 (by-poll)	57.03%
2011	36.79%

Voter turnout
2026	87.39%
2021 (by-poll)	57.43%
2021	61.79%
2016	66.83%
2011 (by-poll)	44.73%
2011	63.78%

=== 2026 ===
In the 2026 elections, Suvendu Adhikari of BJP defeated Mamata Banerjee of TMC by 15,105 votes. This was the second time that Suvendu Adhikari has defeated Banerjee, after Nandigram in 2021.

2026 West Bengal Legislative Assembly election: Bhabanipur
Party	Candidate	Votes	%	±%
BJP	Suvendu Adhikari	73,917	53.02	▲30.73
AITC	Mamata Banerjee	58,812	42.19	▼29.71
CPI(M)	Shrijeeb Biswas	3,556	2.55	▼1.01
INC	Pradip Prasad	1,257	0.9	New entry
NOTA	None of the above	829	0.59	▼0.64
Majority		15,105	10.83	▼38.78
Turnout		1,40,252	87.35	▲29.86
BJP gain from AITC		Swing	60.44	

==== 2021 by-election ====
Following her narrow loss in the 2021 Nandigram Assembly constituency to BJP’s Suvendu Adhikari she needed to win a by-election to retain her position as Chief Minister of West Bengal. Sovandeb Chattopadhyay who won the Bhabanipur seat in the April 2021 assembly elections, resigned from his position on May 21, 2021, to vacate the seat for Mamata.

2021 West Bengal Legislative Assembly by-election: Bhabanipur
Party	Candidate	Votes	%	±%
AITC	Mamata Banerjee	85,263	71.90	▲14.19
BJP	Priyanka Tibrewal	26,428	22.29	▼12.87
CPI(M)	Shrijeeb Biswas	4,226	3.56	New
NOTA	None of the above	1,453	1.23	Hold
Majority		58,835	49.61	▲27.06
Turnout		1,18,614	57.49	▼4.30
AITC hold		Swing	▲14.19	

=== 2021 ===
2021 West Bengal Legislative Assembly election: Bhabanipur
Party	Candidate	Votes	%	±%
AITC	Sovandeb Chattopadhyay	73,505	57.71	▲10.04
BJP	Rudranil Ghosh	44,786	35.16	▲16.03
INC	Md. Shadab Khan	5,211	4.09	▼25.17
BSP	Anita Rajwar	564		
NOTA	None of the Above	1,570		
Majority		28,719	22.55	▲4.14
Turnout		1,27,536	61.79	▼5.04
AITC hold		Swing	▲10.04	

=== 2016 ===
2016 West Bengal Legislative Assembly election: Bhabanipur
Party	Candidate	Votes	%	±%
AITC	Mamata Banerjee	65,520	47.67	▼29.79
INC	Deepa Dasmunshi	40,219	29.26	New
BJP	Chandra Kumar Bose	26,299	19.13	New
BSP	Nirmal Kanti Samaddar	669		
NOTA	None of the Above	2,461		
Majority		25,301	18.41	▼38.62
Turnout		1,37,475	66.83	▲22.11
AITC hold		Swing	▼29.79	

==== 2011 by-election ====
The bypoll to the Bhawanipore seat was necessitated after sitting MLA of Trinamool Congress Subrata Bakshi resigned to make way for the Chief Minister Mamata Banerjee to contest. She had to become a member of the state assembly within six months of her assuming office as Chief Minister as per the rules of the Constitution of India.

Bye-election, 2011: Bhabanipur
Party	Candidate	Votes	%	±%
AITC	Mamata Banerjee	73,635	77.46	▲12.69
CPI(M)	Nandini Mukherjee	19,422	20.43	▼7.55
Independent	Sujay Krishna Bhadra	809	0.85	New
Majority		54,213	57.03	▲20.24
Turnout		95,064	44.73	▼19.04
AITC hold		Swing	▲12.69	

=== 2011 ===
2011 West Bengal Legislative Assembly election: Bhabanipur
Party	Candidate	Votes	%	±%
AITC	Subrata Bakshi	87,903	64.77	
CPI(M)	Narayan Prasad Jain	37,967	27.98	
BJP	Ram Chandra Jaiswal	5,078	3.74	
BSP	Dulal Mistri	1,050	0.77	
Majority		49,936	36.79	
Turnout		1,35,741	63.78	
AITC win				
