= Jamal Uddin Ahmed (politician) =

Indian politician (1954 - 2021)

Member of Assam Legislative Assembly
- In office 18 May 2001 – 19 April 2006
- Preceded by: Abu Saleh Najmuddin
- Succeeded by: Anwarul Haq
- Constituency: Badarpur
- In office 18 May 2011 – 27 January 2021
- Preceded by: Anwarul Haq
- Succeeded by: Abdul Aziz

Personal details
- Born: 12 June 1954 Karimganj, Assam, India
- Died: 27 January 2021 (aged 66) Barak Valley, Assam, India
- Party: All India Trinamool Congress
- Other party: Indian National Congress

Jamal Uddin Ahmed (Bengali: জামাল উদ্দিন আহমেদ, Bengali pronunciation: [dʒamal udːin aɦmed]; 12 June 1954 – 27 January 2021) was an Indian politician and former Member of the Assam Legislative Assembly.

== Early life ==
Ahmed was born on 12 June 1954, to Bengali Muslim parents Haji Najib Ali and Sayful Bibi in Assam's Karimganj, which was a part of Sylhet district before the 1947 Partition of India.

== Career ==
After passing his High School Leaving Certificate, Ahmed began social work. He became the president of a cultural club, and made a visit to Bangladesh.

Ahmed was successful in the 2001 Assam Legislative Assembly elections in which he represented the All India Trinamool Congress in the Badarpur constituency. He lost this seat to Anwarul Haq of the All India United Democratic Front in 2006.

In 2011, Ahmed won the elections as an Indian National Congress candidate and served two more times as MLA for Badarpur.

== Personal life ==
Ahmed married twice, and one of his spouses was Rahima Begum. He had two sons and two daughters, including Zakariyya Ahmed.

== Death ==
Whilst being transferred from Karimganj Civil Hospital to Silchar Medical Hospital, Ahmed died on 27 January 2021 during his third tenure as MLA. After his death no by-election was held in the constituency as state elections were already scheduled from March 27 to April 6, 2021.
