= Abhishek Banerjee (politician) =

Indian politician (born 1987)

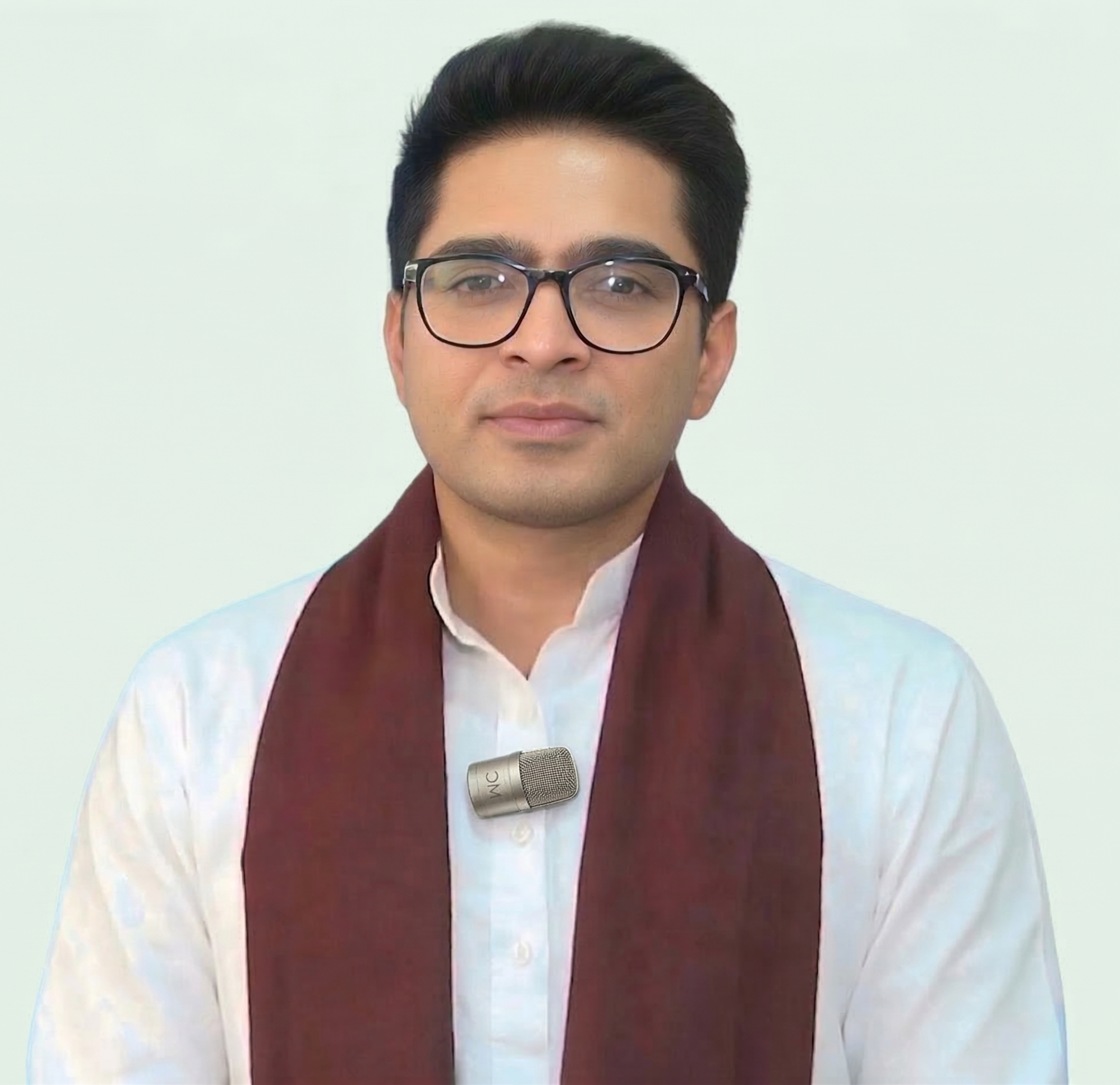
- Banerjee in 2026

Leader of Mamata All India Trinamool Congress in Lok Sabha
- Incumbent
- Assumed office 18 September 2026

National General Secretary of Mamata All India Trinamool Congress
- Incumbent
- Assumed office 18 September 2026
- Chairperson: Mamata Banerjee

Parliamentary Chairperson of Mamata All India Trinamool Congress
- Incumbent
- Assumed office 03 May 2026

Member of Parliament, Lok Sabha
- Incumbent
- Assumed office 16 May 2014
- Preceded by: Somendra Nath Mitra
- Constituency: Diamond Harbour, West Bengal

President of Trinamool Youth Congress
- In office 21 July 2011 – 5 June 2021
- Succeeded by: Saayoni Ghosh

Personal details
- Born: 7 November 1987 (age 39) Calcutta, West Bengal, India
- Party: Mamata All India Trinamool Congress
- Other political affiliations: Trinamool Congress (till 2026)
- Spouse: Rujira Narula (m. 2012)
- Children: 2
- Relatives: Mamata Banerjee (aunt)
- Education: Indian Institute of Planning and Management (BBA, MBA)
- Profession: Politician

Abhishek Banerjee (born 7 November 1987) is an Indian politician who had been a Member of Parliament for Diamond Harbour, West Bengal, since 2014 .

Banerjee was a member of the Standing Committee of Commerce in 2014, as well as a member of the Consultative Committee under the Ministry of Finance and Corporate Affairs in 2014. He also served on the Railway Convention Committee from April 2015 to May 2019. of External Affairs since September 2019. On 5 June 2021 he was appointed the general secretary of Trinamool Congress.

== Personal life ==
Abhishek Banerjee is the nephew of former West Bengal Chief Minister Mamata Banerjee. He was born into a Bengali Hindu family. He was born and raised in Kolkata, India. Banerjee went to Nava Nalanda High School and M.P. Birla Foundation Higher Secondary School, both in Kolkata. After relocating to Delhi, Banerjee studied for his MBA and BBA degrees in Human Resource and Marketing at the now-defunct and contentious Indian Institute of Planning and Management in 2009, New Delhi. On February 24, 2012, Banerjee married Rujira Narula, a Thai national. They have a son and a daughter together.

== Political career ==
Abhishek Banerjee entered politics as a member of the Trinamool Congress in 2011, after the party ousted the 34-year-old Communist Party of India (Marxist)-led Left Front regime by winning the Assembly Election that year. In 2011, Banerjee was elected National President of the All India Trinamool Youth Congress, establishing him as the Trinamool Congress's youth icon.

Banerjee represented the TMC in the 2014 Lok Sabha elections as a candidate from the Diamond Harbour constituency. He defeated his closest opponent, Abul Hasnat of the CPI(M), by a wide margin. At that time, Banerjee was the youngest parliamentarian in the lower house. He also organised the M.P. Cup Football Tournament. to encourage young people in his district to participate in sports and physical exercise. Following the successful conclusion of his first term, Banerjee defeated the closest opponent from the BJP by a margin of 320,594 votes in the 2019 Lok Sabha Election from Diamond Harbour. Abhishek broke the previous record by winning the Diamond Harbour constituency of the 2024 Lok Sabha for the third time in a row with 7,10,930 votes.

=== Partner of the Indian National Developmental Alliance's coordination committee ===
At the Indian National Developmental Inclusive Alliance convention in Mumbai on September 1, 2023, Banerjee was named a member of the Coordination Committee.

=== Internal Rebellion ===
A hoard of important Trinamool Congress functionaries openly rebelled against Banerjee, calling him autocratic and arrogant. While some of them left Mamata Banerjee, other have stayed with Mamata but have issued stern warning in this regard.

Among the prominent members leading the rebellion are Ritabrata Banerjee, Krishnendu Narayan Chowdhury and Rabindranath Ghosh, the old guard Kalyan Banerjee has openly asked Mamata to choose between him and Abhishek Banerjee.

=== 2026 MPs Rebellion ===
Following the 2026 Assembly Elections, 20 out of the 28 Members of Parliament from Trinamool Congress decided to leave Mamata Banerjee and the Trinamool Congress. They formed a new group and decided to merge with a relatively little known party, the Nationalist Citizens Party of India and presented a representation in this regards to Lok Sabha Speaker Om Birla on 14 June 2026.

After this major split in the Trinamool Congress, only 8 Lok Sabha MPs remained loyal to Mamata Banerjee. The loyalist MPs included Abhishek Banerjee, Mahua Moitra, Saugata Roy, Kalyan Banerjee, Kirti Azad, Pratima Mondal and Sajda Ahmed.

== Legal Issues ==
=== Enforcement Directorate cases ===
Banerjee and his wife Rujira Banerjee were summoned by the Enforcement Directorate in August 2021 in an alleged money laundering case involving coal smuggling. The criminal case in this matter had originally been registered by CBI after which the ED initiated money laundering probe into alleged theft in the government coalfields.

He was questioned in New Delhi in September 2021, followed by second round of questioning in March 2022 in Kolkata.

He appeared before ED for the third time in November 2023 in Bengal school jobs scam, inked to alleged improprieties in recruitment of teacher in state-aided schools.

Banerjee was again summoned by ED in Kolkata on 15 June 2026 when he was interrogated for more than 11 hours in connection with the alleged primary school recruitment scam in West Bengal.

=== MLA Signature Forgery case ===
In May 2026, certain MLAs of Trinamool Congress alleged that their signatures were forged on a resolution recording the unanimous decision about election of the Leader of Opposition from Trinamool Congress in West Bengal Assembly.

A criminal case has been registered in this matter and is being investigated by Criminal Investigation Department (CID) of West Bengal. The CID even conducted searches at the residence of ex West Bengal Chief Minister Mamata Banerjee, on the pretext of its being the Party office of Trinamool Congress.

Abhishek Banerjee has been named the prime accused in this case. When the CID issued summons to Banerjee for interrogation, he moved to Calcutta High Court, which granted him interim protection from arrest. He appeared before the CID on 11 June 2026 and was interrogated for 05 hours. He was summoned again on 14 June, when he was again questioned for 05 hours.

=== Mid night Raid ===
The West Bengal Police and the Central agencies raided Banerjee's house in Kalighat’s Patuapara Road in the early hours of 13 June 2026. The police belonged to Salboni police station in Paschim Medinipur district, who claimed they were looking for Banerjee's personnel assistant Sumit Roy in a financial embezzlement case.

The Police barged in and it soon resulted in high voltage drama, with Mamata Banerjee soon coming to her nephew's house, leading to heated discussions with the Police.

In the process Banerjee also lost his cool, while interacting with Media.

It created further political storm and mutual skirmishes, with Trinamool Congress MP Trinamool Congress MP Sagarika Ghose alleging it as being a politically motivated operation that actually resulted in no yield of any kind of evidence of wrongdoing.

=== Trader Threat Case ===
On 13 June 2026, a businessman Sanjay Kumar Singhal, from Siliguri filed a fresh criminal case against Banerjee.

The FIR has been registered at Cyber police station in Siliguri Police Commissionerate. It has been registered as regards the alleged speeches of Banerjee. The complaint specifically refers to the speeches and addresses made at the Nandigram rally on March 25, 2026, public meeting and roadshow at Maheshtala on April 27, 2026, and election rally at Arambagh.

== May 2026 Attack ==
On 30 May 2026, a mob attacked Banerjee in Sonarpur in South 24 Parganas district at around 3 PM. Citizens including a group of women protested against him with black flags and eggs. These eggs were hurled at Abhishek Banerjee followed by physical assault. Eggs and pieces of brick were thrown at him, while Banerjee saved himself by wearing a cricket helmet given by a party worker. He was slapped, punched and physical assaulted, while slogans were continuously chanted against him.

Banerjee was taken to the private hospital Apollo Multispeciality Hospitals on EM Bypass, where he was initially examined but not admitted. Then he was taken to Belle Vue Clinic at Minto Park, where he was given further evaluation. He was out of hospital at around 11 pm.

This incidence resulted in big political controversy, with Mamata Banerjee alleging BJP for this incidence and also alleging the hospitals to working in tandem with the political masters on political and administrative pressure. In contrast, BJP has denied having any linkage to the given incidence. Instead, it has alleged Mamata Banerjee of threatening the hospital administration.

5 persons have been arrested so far in the given incidence, though the BJP Government in West Bengal has called then TMC workers.

The Indian National Developmental Inclusive Alliance (INDIA or INDI Alliance), right from Rahul Gandhi, Akhilesh Yadav and others, has wholeheartedly supported Mamata Banerjee on this cause.

Meanwhile Mamata has announced public protest on 2 June against the attacks on Abhishek Banerjee and Kalyan Banerjee in rapid succession.

Lok Sabha
Preceded by Somen Mitra	Member of Parliament in Lok Sabha for Diamond Harbour; 2014 –	Incumbent
