= Abdul Aziz (Indian politician) =

Indian politician

- আব্দুল আজীজ
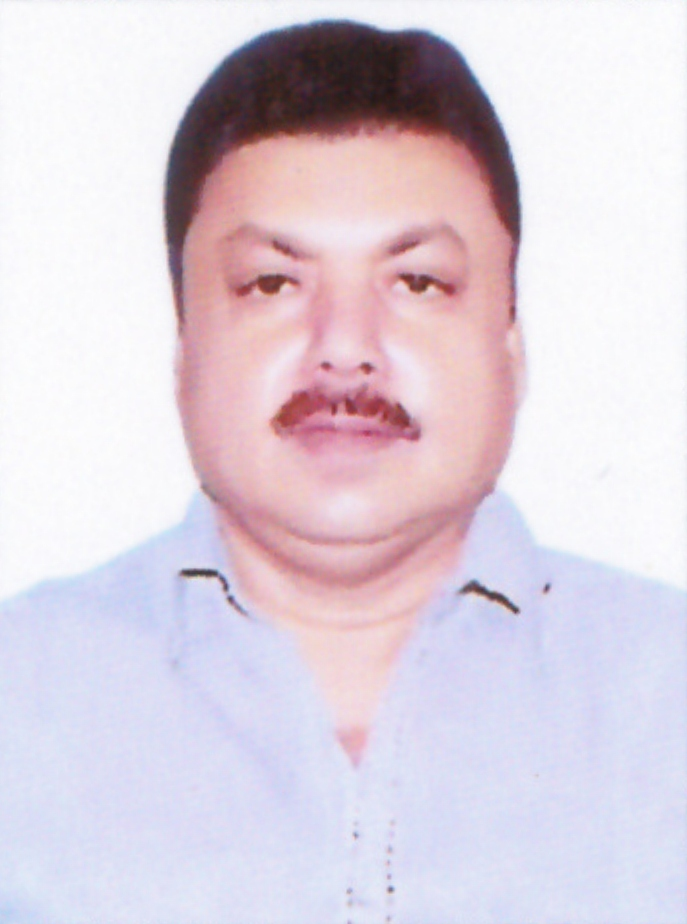
- Aziz in 2021

Member of 15th Assam Legislative Assembly
- Incumbent
- Assumed office 21 May 2021
- Preceded by: Jamal Uddin Ahmed
- Succeeded by: Constituency Abolished
- Constituency: Badarpur

Personal details
- Born: 1969 (age 56–57)
- Party: All India United Democratic Front

Abdul Aziz (Bengali: আব্দুল আজীজ) is an Indian politician and Member of the Assam Legislative Assembly.

== Early life and family ==
Abdul Aziz was born in 1968 or 1969, into a Bengali Muslim family in India. His father was Abdul Latif of Kanishail. In 1988, he achieved his Higher Secondary School Certificate and later married Asma Begum.

== Career ==
Abdul Aziz began his career as a businessman before also getting involved in politics. He contested to be MLA in 2016 assembly election but lost to Jamal Uddin Ahmed. He was successful in the 2021 Assam Legislative Assembly elections by defeating BJP candidate Biswarup Bhattacharjee, representing the All India United Democratic Front in the Badarpur constituency.

On 5 March 2026, Aziz was suspended from the AIUDF for 6 years for supporting the National Democratic Alliance's slate of candidates for the 2026 Rajya Sabha elections.
