= Dipanjan Chakraborty =

Indian politician in West Bengal

Member of the West Bengal Legislative Assembly
- Incumbent
- Assumed office 4 May 2026
- Preceded by: Kanchan Mullick
- Constituency: Uttarpara

Personal details
- Party: Bharatiya Janata Party
- Spouse: Rupakshi Ramchandra Desai
- Parent: Manindra Nath Chakraborty
- Education: University of Kalyani
- Profession: Politician; Retired NSG Commando

Dipanjan Chakraborty (Bengali: দীপাঞ্জন চক্রবর্তী) is a politician from West Bengal. He is a member of West Bengal Legislative Assembly, from Uttarpara Assembly constituency. He is a member of Bharatiya Janata Party.

== Early life and education ==
Chakraborty is from Nadia district of West Bengal. His qualification is B.Com pass.

== Political career ==
He is a member of West Bengal Legislative Assembly, from Uttarpara Assembly constituency.

=== Electoral performance ===
West Bengal Legislative Assembly
Year	Constituency	Party	Votes	%	Opponent	Party	Votes	%	Margin	Result
2026	Uttarpara	BJP	80,612	39.24	Sirsanya Bandopadhyay	AITC	70,197	34.17	10415	Won

== See also ==
- 2026 West Bengal Legislative Assembly election
- List of chief ministers of West Bengal
- West Bengal Legislative Assembly
