= Trinamool Youth Congress =

Indian congress youth wing

- President: Arnab Banerjee
- Founded: 2011; 15 years ago
- Headquarters: 30B Harish Chatterjee Street, Kolkata 700026
- Mother party: Trinamool Congress
- Website: aitcofficial.org/trinamool-youth-congress

The Trinamool Youth Congress was the youth wing of the Trinamool Congress in India.

== Organisation ==
The YUVA was established on 21 July 2011 at the Shaheed Dibas Rally at Kolkata. Later, YUVA merged with Trinamool Youth Congress. Abhishek Banerjee served as the President of YUVA from 2011 until its merger with Trinamool Youth Congress. He subsequently became the president of Trinamool Youth Congress, and occupied the office till 2021. He was succeeded by Saayoni Ghosh.

== Activities ==
Trinamul Youth Congress mural in Kolkata, made ahead of the 2005 Kolkata Municipal Corporation elections

The Trinamool Youth Congress are active in grassroots politics, activism and social work.

== List of presidents ==
No	Portrait	Name	Tenure	
1		Sanjay Bakshi	1 January 1998	5 May 2002
2		Madan Mitra	5 May 2002	1 June 2011
3		Suvendu Adhikari	1 June 2011	13 Dec 2013
4		Saumitra Khan	13 Dec 2013	20 July 2014
5		Abhishek Banerjee	21 July 2014	5 June 2021
6		Saayoni Ghosh	5 June 2021	13 June 2026
7		Arnab Banerjee	13 June 2026	Present
