= Jitendra Nath Lahiri =

Indian politician

The marble bust of Jitendra Nath Lahiri in Serampore, displaying his inscribed dates of birth and death of 7 March 1886 – 7 March 1975. This statue was inaugurated by ex-Chief Minister Prafulla Chandra Sen in Serampore (Battala).

Jitendra Nath Lahiri (7 March 1886 – 7 March 1975) was a Bengali revolutionary turned industrialist, and later a leading politician from Serampore, a suburban settlement near Calcutta, India.

== Early Life and Education ==
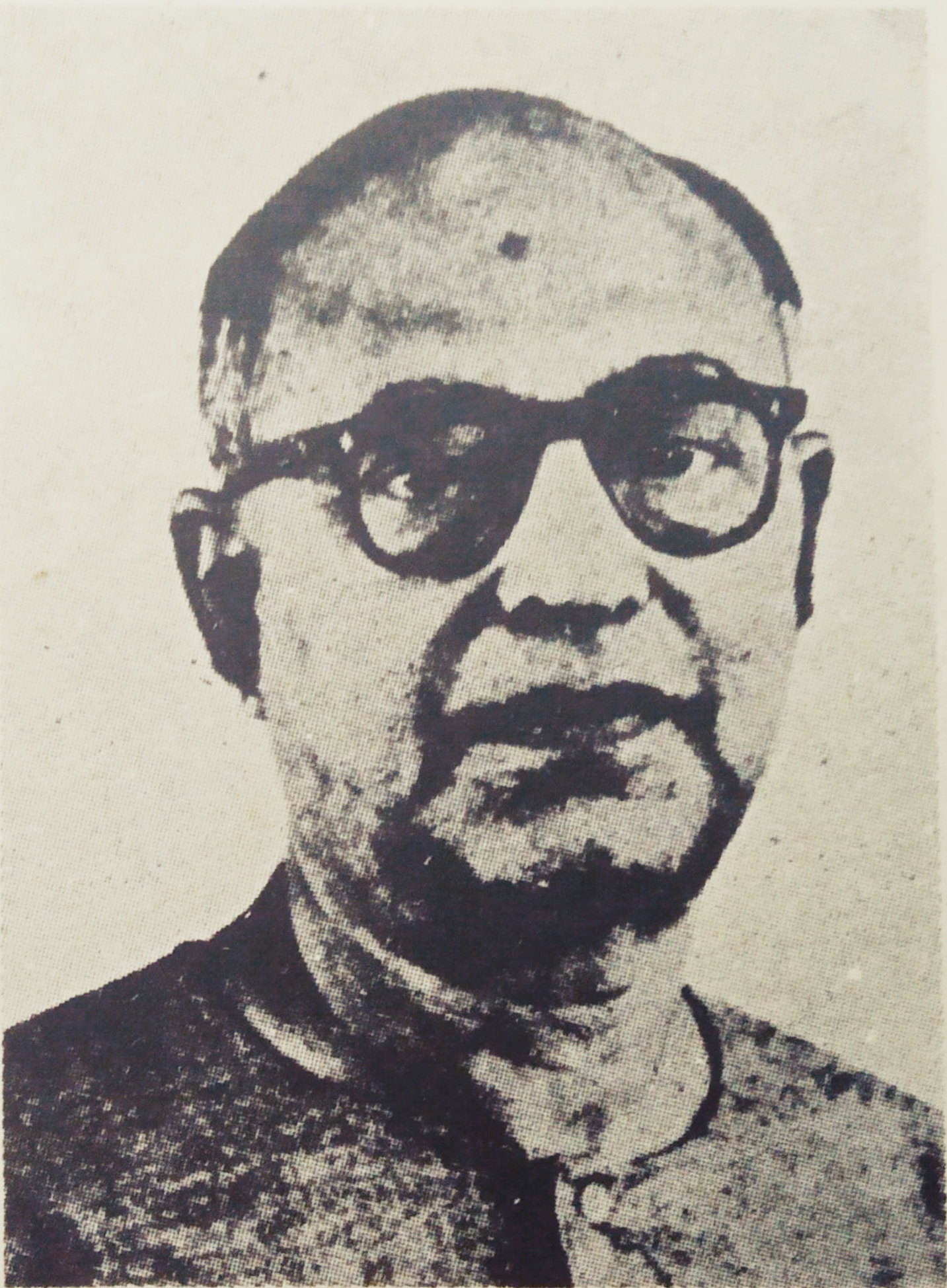
Jitendra Lahiri

He was born on 7 March 1886 in Serampore, located in the Hooghly district of West Bengal, to Shashi Bhushan Lahiri. Ever since his childhood he had been an outstanding student. He completed his initial schooling at Chatra High School (later renamed the Nandalal Institution) passing his Entrance Examination with distinction in 1903. He pursued his higher studies in science and graduated from Calcutta University in 1911, earning first class honors in Chemistry and placing second in order of merit, which secured him a university scholarship.

On the recommendation of senior Bengal revolutionaries, he moved to United States for advanced research and enrolled at the University of California, Berkeley (USA). To support his living costs during his studies, he worked in regional vineyards. He completed his Master of Science Degree with first class marks at University of California, Berkeley publishing a thesis titled 'The Study of the Catalytic Change of Para-amino-triphenyl-carbinol from the Colorless Base to the Colored Salt in the Presence of Acids'. He subsequently began pursuing his doctoral degree (Ph.D.) in Chemistry at the same institution. He went on to become the second Indian to complete his education from the University of California, Berkeley (USA).

== Revolutionary Career and World War 1 Espionage ==
It was during his stay in Berkeley that Jitendra Nath Lahiri developed a strong interest in nationalism. According to memoirs by fellow revolutionary Darisi Chencheyya, Gadar Party founder Har Dayal deliberately selected Jitendra Nath Lahiri as part of an elite "student nucleus" to organize the movement's intellectual operations on the American West Coast. Through these networks he worked closely alongside notable expatriate figures like Bhupendranath Datta and Virendranath Chattopadhyaya (brother of Sarojini Naidu). Upon the outbreak of World War 1 in 1914, he was summoned to Europe by the German wing of Indian revolutionaries. He abandoned his doctoral research and successfully crossed from the United States into Germany.

In Germany, he underwent specialized para-military training and mastered industrial production techniques for chemical explosives. His operational efficiency was acknowledged by Imperial German Field Marshal Paul von Hindenburg, who personally presented him with an automatic Mauser pistol and high-powered prism binoculars.

Acting as a critical liaison, he helped orchestrate financial and logistics channels between European handlers, the Helferrich brothers in Batvia (Jakarta) and the Bengal Jugantar faction led by his political mentor, Jatin Mukherjee (better known as "Bagha Jatin"). As recorded in Dr. Bhupendranath Datta's historical accounts, Jitendra Nath Lahiri personally slipped back to India to convey the arrival layout of the munitions fleet. He was physically stationed on board of the cargo vessel SS Maverick during the Christmas Day Plot of 1915 to help oversee the shipment of German-funded munitions into India. Flagged by British intelligence surveillance files as an underground operative, he was arrested by colonial authorities in late 1915. He was imprisoned until 1919 and subsequently placed under forced internment across multiple locations.

== Nationalist Movements and Industrial Career ==
Following the release from colonial internment, Jitendra Nath Lahiri aligned with Mahatma Gandhi's mass national platforms. He joined the Indian National Congress and served as the primary Congress organizer in the Hooghly District during Non-cooperation movement (1919–1922). He later assumed active local leadership roles in Gandhi's Satyagraha, Civil Disobedience and the Quit India Movement of 1942. He championed swadeshi economic self-reliance through community initiatives, setting up indigenous cloth stores, funding handloom operations, and organizing relief networks to distribute rice to poor families during regional famines.

Utilizing his specialized Chemistry and polymer background from UC Berkley, he resolved to break the British Trade monopoly on heavy machinery components. In 1926, he invested his family fortune to establish the Bengal Belting Company, the first Belting indigenous factory in India. He subsequently expanded his operations founding Hindustan Belting and Serampore Belting Works Pvt Ltd, earning the historical title of "The Father of the Indian Belting Industry". He also partnered with Prafulla Chandra Ray when the Indian Chemical Council was established in 1938, serving as a founding member and later presiding over the council from 1941 to 1943. Additionally he was an early pioneer of the indigenous electric lamp sector, serving as a founder Managing Director of the Bengal Electrical Lamps Works Ltd.

== Political Career and Later Life ==
Under the political guidance of West Bengal's second chief minister, Dr Bidhan Chandra Roy, he formally entered electoral politics after independence. He served as the vice chairman of Serampore Municipality and was subsequently elected as an MLA to the West Bengal Legislative Assembly for the 1951-1957 session(1st MLA of Serampore). In the 1957 general election, he contested the federal Serampore constituency under the Indian National Congress banner and won the parliamentary seat to serve in the 2nd Lok Sabha(2nd MP of Serampore). He formally retired from active politics in 1965 at the age of 79 due to his failing health and to focus purely on local social welfare.

== Philanthropy, Legacy and Character ==
Jitendra Nath Lahiri was widely noted for his deep empathy towards the working class, rejecting punitive worker terminations and personally funding the medical and domestic needs of his factory laborers out of his pocket. He was a dedicated educational patron, serving as the President of the Rishra Vidhyapith Trust from 1952 until his death. He also donated his own residential land and building to build multi story science facilities at the Serampore Town Academy. This property was later donated by his descendants to the government in the name of his wife "Serampore Malina Lahiri Boys' Academy".

According to recorded memoirs (Smriticharan) by his long-time home physician, Dr Shantiram Chowdhury, Jitendra Nath Lahiri maintained an unpretentious, private lifestyle and rarely discussed his high-risk international espionage operations in regular conversation. Later reminiscences documented by principal Prashant Kumar Pain highlighted Jitendra Nath Lahiri's hands-on community management style, noting instances where he personally authorized emergency financing, supplies, and brick-and-mortar construction within days to fix school infrastructure.

Jitendra Nath Lahiri passed away in Calcutta on his birthday, 7 March 1975, at the age of 89, due to medical complications while recovering from a major surgical operation . To honor his lifetime contributions, the Serampore Municipality erected a marble bust at the junction of G.T. Road and J.N. Lahiri Road, which was inaugurated by ex-Chief Minister Prafulla Chandra Sen, and subsequently renamed a major municipal commercial artery Jitendra Nath Lahiri Road.

== See also ==
- Christmas Day Plot
- Bagha Jatin
