= Abu Saleh Najmuddin =

Indian politician

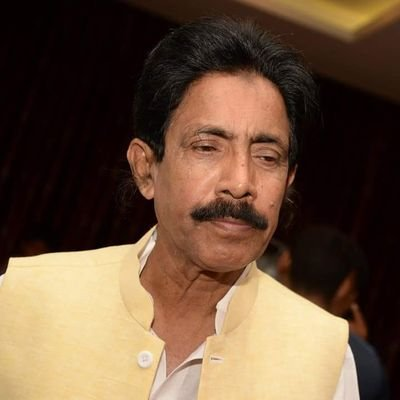
Abu Saleh Najmuddin

Abu Saleh Najmuddin was a former legislator of Assam. He won elections to the Assam Legislative Assembly in 1991 and 1996 from Badarpur constituency. He served as a Minister in the Government of Assam under the chief ministership of late Hiteswar Saikia. Abu Saleh is an advocate by profession.

== Political career ==
Abu Saleh contested the 1996 Assembly Constituency Election as an Indian National Congress candidate and was elected as the MLA from Badarpur constituency with 30138 votes against Dipak Deb of BJP who gained 2nd position with 16434 votes.

In 1996, he stood against CPM candidate Ramendra De whom he defeated with a huge margin of 35,256 votes.
