= Trinamool Congress =

Political party in India

All India Trinamool Congress
- Abbreviation: AITC (official); TMC (alternative)
- Presidium: National Working Committee
- Founder: Mamata Banerjee; Ajit Panja
- Founded: 1 January 1998 (28 years ago)
- Split from: Indian National Congress
- Headquarters: 30B Harish Chatterjee Street, Kolkata 700026
- Newspaper: Jago Bangla (Bengali)
- Student wing: Trinamool Chatra Parishad
- Youth wing: Trinamool Youth Congress
- Women's wing: Trinamool Mahila Congress
- Labour wing: Indian National Trinamool Trade Union Congress
- Peasant's wing: Trinamool Kisan Khet Majdur Congress
- Ideology: Bengali nationalism; Regionalism; Populism; Welfarism; Progressivism
- Political position: Centre
- Colours: Green
- Slogan: Joy Bangla; Khela Hobe (Electoral Slogan); Ma Mati Manush (Political Slogan)
- ECI status: State Party (Note: ECI has frozen the party logo and name due to an internal split between Democratic Trinamool Congress, and Mamata All India Trinamool Congress with both currently claiming the party.)
- Alliance: INDIA (2023–2026); NDA (1998–2001, 2003–2006); UPA (2009–2012)

Election symbol

Party flag
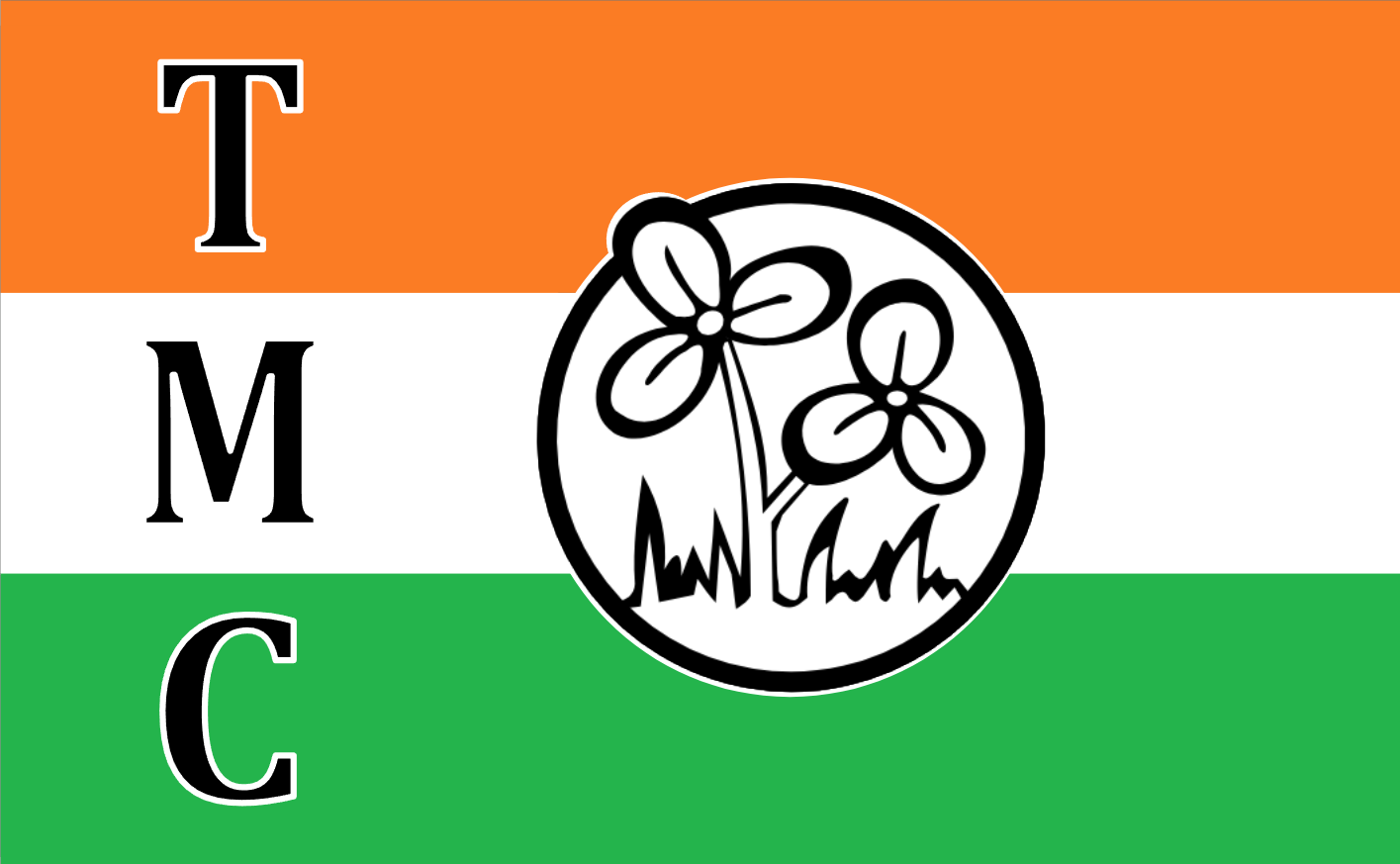

Website
- aitcofficial.org

The All India Trinamool Congress (AITC, transl. All India Grassroots Congress), or simply referred to as the Trinamool Congress (TMC; transl. Grassroots Congress), initially named West Bengal Trinamool Congress, is an Indian political party based in the state of West Bengal founded by Mamata Banerjee in 1998.

AITC began as a breakaway faction of the Indian National Congress and rapidly rose to prominence in the politics of West Bengal under Banerjee's leadership. AITC ruled the state of West Bengal with Banerjee serving as chief minister from 2011 until 2026. The party first came to rule the state after defeating the Left Front in 2011 elections. Subsequently, the party won in 2016 and 2021 elections. However, it failed to gain majority in 2026 election, and was defeated by the Bharatiya Janata Party (BJP). After a rebellion within the party, the name and symbol of the party was frozen. Three factions emerged from the rebellion, the Nationalist Citizens Party of India, Democratic Trinamool Congress, and Mamata All India Trinamool Congress.

== History ==
=== Founding ===
After being a member of the Indian National Congress (INC) for over 26 years, Mamata Banerjee quit the INC and established the AITC in 1998. The official election symbol of the AITC is Jora Ghas Phul (two flowers with grass). In the 1998 Lok Sabha polls, AITC won seven seats. In the next Lok Sabha election that was held in 1999, All India Trinamool Congress won eight seats with BJP, thus increasing its tally by one. In 2000, AITC won the Kolkata Municipal Corporation elections.

The party initially joined the National Democratic Alliance (NDA), as part of the Vajpayee government, and was initially quite successful, winning seven seats in its first election in 1998. In the 2001 Vidhan Sabha elections, the AITC won 60 seats in alliance with the INC, becoming the principal opposition party. They suffered big losses in the 2004 Lok Sabha elections and the 2006 West Bengal Legislative Assembly election, and subsequently left the National Democratic Alliance (NDA).

=== Nandigram movement ===
In December 2006, the people of Nandigram were given notice by Haldia Development Authority that a major portion of Nandigram would be seized and 70,000 people evicted from their homes to make way for a chemical plant. People started a movement against this land acquisition and the AITC helped lead the movement. The Bhumi Uchchhed Pratirodh Committee ('Committee against Land Evictions'; BUPC) was formed to protest against the eviction. On 14 March 2007, the police opened fire on the protesters and killed 14 villagers and many more went missing. Many sources claimed (and the claims were supported by the Central Bureau of Investigation in its report) that armed Communist Party of India (Marxist) cadres, along with police, fired on protesters in Nandigram Many intellectuals protested in the streets and this incident gave birth to a new movement. Socialist Unity Centre of India (Communist) leader Nanda Patra led the movement. The events led to a significant backlash against the CPI(M) government, and were a major factor in the AITC's success in the elections that followed.

=== Post-Nandigram/Singur elections ===
In the 2009 Lok Sabha election, AITC won 19 seats in West Bengal, in alliance with the Congress. They subsequently became a part of Manmohan Singh's government, with Banerjee serving as Minister of Railways.

In the 2010 Kolkata municipal election, the party won 97 out of 141 seats. It also won a majority of other municipalities.

=== In government ===
In the 2011 West Bengal Legislative Assembly election, the AITC-led alliance that included the INC and SUCI(C) won 227 seats in the 294-seat legislature, defeating the incumbent Left Front government which had been in power for 34 years. AITC alone won 184 seats, enabling it to govern without an alliance. Subsequently, it won a by-election in Basirhat and two Congress MLAs switched to the AITC, giving it a total of 187 seats. Banerjee, an MP at the time, had not contested the election and had to transfer to the safe seat of Bhabanipur.

On 18 September 2012, Banerjee announced her decision to withdraw support to the UPA after the AITC's demands to undo government-instituted changes including FDI in retail, increase in the price of diesel and limiting the number of subsidised cooking gas cylinders for households, were not met.

The 2014 Lok Sabha elections saw the AITC dominate the state, winning 34 out of the 42 seats. It also qualified for national party status, as the TMC had received 6% of the vote from five different states (West Bengal, Manipur, Tripura, Jharkhand and Assam). On 2 September 2016, the Election Commission recognised AITC as a national political party.

The party was reelected in the 2016 election to a supermajority government, and Banerjee continued as chief minister.

The party won the most seats in West Bengal in the 2019 Indian general election, but suffered significant losses to the Bharatiya Janata Party, which for the first time established itself as a major force in the state. After the election, the party's status came under revision by the Election Commission of India, due to a loss in presence in most states outside West Bengal.

Banerjee's government was reelected again in the 2021 state election by an unexpectedly large margin over the BJP. Prior to the election, several high-profile AITC members such as Mukul Roy and Suvendu Adhikari had defected to the BJP. Despite the large winning margin, Banerjee was defeated by Adhikari in the Nandigram seat, where she had transferred to fight Adhikari head-on.

In the 2024 Indian general election, the AITC's campaign was led by Abhishek Banerjee and was formally part of the Indian National Developmental Inclusive Alliance. The party won 29 seats, gaining 7. In the 2026 Rajya Sabha elections, AITC nominated lawyer Menaka Guruswamy to be an MP, with her becoming India's first openly LGBTQ+ national-level member of Parliament.

=== 2026 electoral defeat and subsequent split ===
In May 2026, Banerjee led the party into the 2026 West Bengal Legislative Assembly election, seeking a fourth consecutive mandate. However, her party faced a landslide defeat to the BJP, losing 135 seats. Banerjee herself was defeated by the new Chief Minister Adhikari in Bhabanipur. In a move unprecedented in Indian politics, outgoing Chief Minister Mamata Banerjee refused to resign her office despite losing her seat and a majority in the assembly as a result of the election, alleging irregularities in its conduct. She vacated the office upon the dissolution of the assembly by the governor at the end of its term on 7 May 2026. Veteran AITC politician Sovandeb Chattopadhyay led the party in Opposition.

After the expulsion of Ritabrata Banerjee from AITC, rebel group MLAs joined with Ritabrata and made a split in the party from Mamata Banerjee leadership. On 3 June 2026, 60 rebel MLAs signed a letter who accepting Ritabrata as their Leader of Opposition of the West Bengal Legislative Assembly and met West Bengal Governor to claim majority in AITC.

In June 2026, after the defeat in legislative election, 20 AITC Lok Sabha MPs including Yusuf Pathan, Saayoni Ghosh, Shatrughan Sinha, Bapi Halder, Mala Roy, Mitali Bag, Deepak Adhikari, Arup Chakraborty, Sharmila Sarkar, Satabdi Roy, Rachna Banerjee, Prasun Banerjee and others declared rebellion in the party and presented their written wish to join National Democratic Alliance. This group was led by Kakoli Ghosh.

The total strength of AITC in Lok Sabha was 28, 20 MPs therefore are eligible for splitting from the party, as per Indian anti-defection laws.

== Presence in different states ==
=== North-East India ===
Arunachal Pradesh: In the 2009 Arunachal Pradesh Legislative Assembly election, Trinamool Congress won five seats and got 15.04% of the total votes. In 2020, an Independent MLA Chakat Aboh joined the TMC.

Assam: In the 2001 Assam Legislative Assembly election, Jamal Uddin Ahmed won Badarpur constituency. He was an All India Trinamool Congress candidate. All-India president of Congress's women's wing and its national spokesperson and former Silchar MP Sushmita Dev joined the Trinamool Congress in August 2021, and remained the president of Assam unit of the party till 2026, when she joined the BJP.

=== Outside North-East India ===
Goa: The All India Trinamool Congress made their state debut in the 2012 assembly election. With the 2022 Goa Legislative Assembly election approaching, the work of organising the party started from September 2021. The work began with the participation of seven-time Goa Chief Minister Luizinho Faleiro. MLA Churchill Alemao joined AITC in the same year. In the 2022 Goa Legislative Assembly Election, it got 5.2% votes.

=== Kerala ===
Kerala Pradesh All India Trinamool Congress was launched in 2009. In 2014, its candidates contested five seats under the party symbol in the parliamentary election. In the 2016 state election, AITC contested in 70 assembly constituencies but due to technical errors, the party symbol was not accepted. The All India Trinamool Congress is aligned with the India Front and the UDF in the state. Democratic Movement of Kerala (DMK) was merged into the All India Trinamool Congress.

=== Manipur ===
In the 2012 assembly elections of Manipur, the party won eight seats and got 10% of the total votes. It became the only opposition party in the Manipur Legislative Assembly. In the 2017 assembly elections, the party won only one seat (from Thanga) and received 5.4% of the total votes cast in the elections. Its lone member of the Manipur Legislative Assembly, Tongbram Robindro Singh, switched to the BJP in 2017.

=== Meghalaya ===
AITC candidate Purno Agitok Sangma won the Tura constituency by a huge margin in the 2004 Lok Sabha election. On 24 November 2021, former Chief Minister of Meghalaya Mukul Sangma along with other 11 MLAs of INC joined AITC, which made AITC the largest opposition party in Meghalaya Legislative Assembly. In 2022, one defected MLA who has earlier switched from INC quit the party and joined BJP. In the 2023 Meghalaya Legislative Assembly election, the All India Trinamool Congress led by Mukul Sangma contested 56 of the 60 seats and won five seats and received 13.32% of the votes; as such, it became a State Party. Since 2024, it is the largest opposition in Meghalaya.

=== Mizoram ===
In 2023, an Independent MLA K. Beichhua joined the AITC.

=== Tripura ===
Under the leadership of Sudip Roy Barman, former leader of opposition and then MLA of Tripura, all six MLAs of the Indian National Congress defected to the AITC in 2016. Later, Barman defected to the BJP along with all of the other AITC MLAs.

AITC won one seat in Ambassa Municipal council in the 2021 Tripura civic polls. AITC emerged as the second largest party in terms of vote-share in the 120 seats it contested out of 334 seats as it garnered 19.9% of the votes in those seats.

=== Uttar Pradesh ===
In 2012, Shyam Sunder Sharma contested the by-poll to Mant constituency and won on an AITC ticket. He later defected to BSP.

== Electoral performance ==
=== General election results ===
Year	Lok Sabha	Party leader	Seats contested	Seats won	Seats +/-	Vote % (in whole country)	Vote swing	Ref.
1998	12th Lok Sabha	Mamata Banerjee	29	7 / 543	▲7	2.42%	Steady	
1999	13th Lok Sabha	Mamata Banerjee	29	8 / 543	▲1	2.57%	▲0.15%	
2004	14th Lok Sabha	Mamata Banerjee	33	2 / 543	▼6	2.07%	▼0.5%	
2009	15th Lok Sabha	Mamata Banerjee	26	19 / 543	▲17	3.20%	▲1.15%	
2014	16th Lok Sabha	Mamata Banerjee	131	34 / 543	▲15	3.84%	▲0.64%	
2019	17th Lok Sabha	Mamata Banerjee	62	22 / 543	▼12	4.11%	▲0.27%	
2024	18th Lok Sabha	Mamata Banerjee	47	29 / 543	▲7	4.37%	▲0.26%	

All time-AITC Lok Sabha seat count

=== State Legislative Assembly elections ===
Vote share in consecutive West Bengal Assembly elections
2026	40.80%
2021	48.02%
2016	44.91%
2011	38.93%
2006	26.64%
2001	30.66%

Legislative Assembly elections
Election Year	Party leader	Seats contested	Seats won	Change in seats	Percentage of votes	Vote swing	Popular vote	Result
Arunachal Pradesh Legislative Assembly
2009		26	5 / 60	▲5	15.04%	–	86,406	Others
Assam Legislative Assembly
2001		23	1 / 126	▲1	0.55%	–	58,361	Others
2011		126	1 / 126	Steady	2.05%	–	283,683	Others
Goa Legislative Assembly
2012	Wilfred de Souza	20	0 / 40		1.81%	–	15,323	Others
2022	Mahua Moitra (Note: Moitra was appointed the state in-charge of the party for the elections. The state unit was later formed on 19 January 2022 with Kiran Kandolkar as president.)	26	0 / 40		5.2%	–	49,480	Others
Manipur Legislative Assembly
2012	Maibam Kunjo	60	7 / 60	▲7	17%	–	237,517	Opposition
2017		60	1 / 60	▼6	1.4%	▼15.6%	23,304	Others
Meghalaya Legislative Assembly
2023	Mukul Sangma	56	5 / 60	▲5	13.78%	▲13.38%	255,742	Opposition
Tripura Legislative Assembly
2018		24	0 / 60		0.3%	–	6,989	Others
2023	Pijush Kanti Biswas	28	0 / 60		0.88%	–	22,316	Others
Uttar Pradesh Legislative Assembly
2012 (By-election)		1	1 / 403	▲1		–		Others
West Bengal Legislative Assembly
2001	Mamata Banerjee	226	60 / 294	▲60	30.66%	–	11,229,396	Opposition
2006	Mamata Banerjee	257	30 / 294	▼30	26.64%	▼4.02%	10,512,153	Opposition
2011	Mamata Banerjee	226	184 / 294	▲154	38.93%	▲12.29%	18,547,678	Government
2016	Mamata Banerjee	293	211 / 294	▲27	44.91%	▲5.98%	24,564,523	Government
2021	Mamata Banerjee	290	215 / 294	▲4	48.02%	▲3.11%	28,968,281	Government
2026	Mamata Banerjee	291	80 / 294	▼135	40.8%	▼7.22%	26,002,017	Opposition

Presidential election results

Election	Candidate	First round		Second round		Result
Election	Candidate	Votes	%	Votes	%	Result
2022	Yashwant Sinha	380,177	35.97	—N/a		Lost ✗

All time-AITC West Bengal Legislative Assembly seat count

== Party symbols and slogans ==
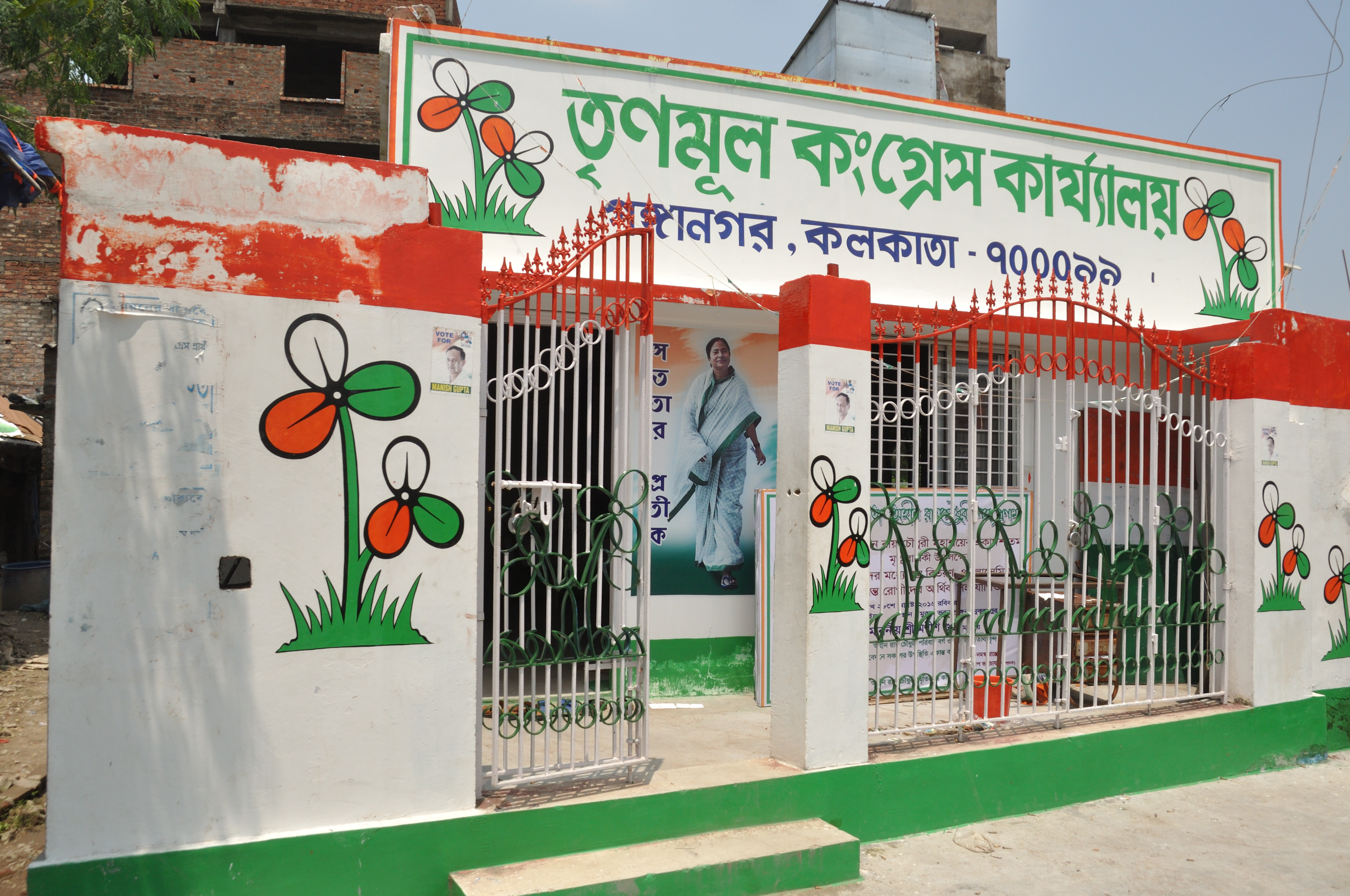
All India Trinamool Congress Party Office, Ganganagar, Mukundapur, Kolkata

The party name and election symbol represents 'grassroots'– the name contains the Bengali word trinamool, which literally means grassroots, and the symbol is a sapling emerging from the ground. The symbol is known as Jora Ghas Phul (Bengali: grass and flower; two flowers with grass). The usage of "All India" in the party name represents the rejection of "elitist" Indian National Congress from which it broke apart from.

Ma Mati Manush (Bengali: মা মাটি মানুষ) was primarily a slogan, coined by Mamata Banerjee. The term is literally translated as "Mother, Motherland and People". The slogan was used in West Bengal at the time of the 2011 assembly election. Mamata Banerjee wrote a Bengali book with the same title. A song was also recorded with the same title.

The slogan Joy Bangla is also officially used by Mamata Banerjee and by her party Trinamool Congress as part of attempt to create a territorial and ethnolinguistic identity for Bengalis in India. It is used in particular, as a closing remark for political speeches.

In the 2021 assembly election, the party used a song "Khela Hobe" across the state. The song was penned by Debangshu Bhattacharya, a party youth wing member. The "Khela Hobe" term has been used across India by several opposition parties and to catalyse the movements against the establishment on multiple issues throughout the nation.

== Frontal organisations ==
=== Trinamool Students Union ===
Trinamool Chhatra Parishad (abbreviated TMCP, WBTMCP or West Bengal Trinamool Chhatra Parishad) popularly known as or "TMCP" is the student wing of the Congress. As of 2026 the president is Priyanka Adhikari. Notable student leaders have included Abhishek Banerjee, General Secretary AITC.

== List of Union Ministers ==
No.	Portrait	Portfolio	Name (Lifespan)	Term in office			Constituency (House)	Prime Minister
No.	Portrait	Portfolio	Name (Lifespan)	Assumed office	Left office	Time in office	Constituency (House)	Prime Minister
1		Minister of Railways	Mamata Banerjee (born 1955)	13 October 1999	16 March 2001	1 year, 154 days	Calcutta South (Lok Sabha)	Atal Bihari Vajpayee
1		Minister without portfolio	Mamata Banerjee (born 1955)	8 September 2003	9 January 2004	123 days	Calcutta South (Lok Sabha)	Atal Bihari Vajpayee
1		Minister of Coal	Mamata Banerjee (born 1955)	9 January 2004	22 May 2004	134 days	Calcutta South (Lok Sabha)	Atal Bihari Vajpayee
1		Minister of Mines	Mamata Banerjee (born 1955)	9 January 2004	22 May 2004	134 days	Calcutta South (Lok Sabha)	Atal Bihari Vajpayee
2		Minister of External Affairs (MoS)	Ajit Kumar Panja (1936–2008)	13 October 1999	16 March 2001	1 year, 154 days	Calcutta North East (Lok Sabha)	Atal Bihari Vajpayee
3		Minister of Railways	Mamata Banerjee (born 1955)	23 May 2009	19 May 2011	1 year, 361 days	Calcutta South (Lok Sabha)	Manmohan Singh
4		Minister of Railways	Dinesh Trivedi (born 1950)	12 July 2011	20 March 2012	252 days	Barrackpore (Lok Sabha)	Manmohan Singh
5		Minister of Railways	Mukul Roy (1954–2026)	20 March 2012	22 September 2012	186 days	West Bengal (Rajya Sabha)	Manmohan Singh
5		Minister of Railways (MoS)	Mukul Roy (1954–2026)	19 May 2011	12 July 2011	54 days	West Bengal (Rajya Sabha)	Manmohan Singh
5		Minister of Shipping (MoS)	Mukul Roy (1954–2026)	28 May 2009	20 March 2012	2 years, 297 days	West Bengal (Rajya Sabha)	Manmohan Singh
6		Minister of Health & Family Welfare (MoS)	Dinesh Trivedi (born 1950)	28 May 2009	12 July 2011	2 years, 45 days	Barrackpore (Lok Sabha)	Manmohan Singh
7		Minister of Health & Family Welfare (MoS)	Sudip Bandyopadhyay (born 1949)	12 July 2011	22 September 2012	1 year, 72 days	Kolkata Uttar (Lok Sabha)	Manmohan Singh
8		Minister of Urban Development (MoS)	Saugata Roy (born 1946)	28 May 2009	22 September 2012	3 years, 117 days	Dum Dum (Lok Sabha)	Manmohan Singh
9		Minister of Rural Development (MoS)	Sisir Adhikari (born 1941)	28 May 2009	22 September 2012	3 years, 117 days	Kanthi (Lok Sabha)	Manmohan Singh
10		Minister of Tourism (MoS)	Sultan Ahmed (1953–2017)	28 May 2009	22 September 2012	3 years, 117 days	Uluberia (Lok Sabha)	Manmohan Singh
11		Minister of Information & Broadcasting (MoS)	Choudhury Mohan Jatua (born 1938)	28 May 2009	22 September 2012	3 years, 117 days	Mathurapur (Lok Sabha)	Manmohan Singh

== Leadership ==
=== List of chairpersons ===
This is a list of chairpersons of the All India Trinamool Congress.

Portrait	Name	Term Start	Term End	Ref.
	Ajit Kumar Panja	1998	2001	
	Mamata Banerjee	2001	2026	

=== List of the national general secretaries ===
This is a list of national general secretaries of the All India Trinamool Congress.

- Mukul Roy (2006—2015)
- Subrata Bakshi (2015–2021)
- Abhishek Banerjee (2021—2026)

== See also ==
- Indian National Congress breakaway parties
- Trinamool Youth Congress
- List of political parties in India
- Indian National Developmental Inclusive Alliance
- 2026 Trinamool Congress split
