= Deshapran (community development block) =

Deshapran Contai II
- Community development block

- Location in West Bengal, India
- Coordinates: 21.8057669°N 87.7739811°E
- Country: India
- State: West Bengal
- District: Purba Medinipur

Government
  - Type: Community development block

Area
  - Total: 170.30 km^{2} (65.75 sq mi)
- Elevation: 3 m (9.8 ft)

Population (2011)
  - Total: 176,393
  - Density: 1,035.8/km^{2} (2,682.7/sq mi)

Languages
  - Official: Bengali, English
- Time zone: UTC+5:30 (IST)
- PIN: 721401 (Contai); 721442 (Basantia)
- Area code: 03220
- ISO 3166 code: IN-WB
- Vehicle registration: WB-29, WB-30, WB-31, WB-32, WB-33
- Literacy: 88.33%
- Lok Sabha constituency: Kanthi
- Vidhan Sabha constituency: Kanthi Uttar
- Website: purbamedinipur.gov.in

Deshapran (earlier known as Kanthi II) is a community development block that forms an administrative division in Contai subdivision of Purba Medinipur district in the Indian state of West Bengal.

== Geography ==
Purba Medinipur district is part of the lower Indo-Gangetic Plain and Eastern coastal plains. Topographically, the district can be divided into two parts – (a) almost entirely flat plains on the west, east and north, (b) the coastal plains on the south. The vast expanse of land is formed of alluvium and is composed of younger and coastal alluvial. The elevation of the district is within 10 metres above mean sea level. The district has a long coastline of 65.5 km along its southern and south eastern boundary. Five coastal CD Blocks, namely, Khejuri II, Contai II (Deshapran), Contai I, Ramnagar I and II, are occasionally affected by cyclones and tornadoes. Tidal floods are quite regular in these five CD Blocks. Normally floods occur in 21 of the 25 CD Blocks in the district. The major rivers are Haldi, Rupnarayan, Rasulpur, Bagui and Keleghai, flowing in north to south or south-east direction. River water is an important source of irrigation. The district has a low 899 hectare forest cover, which is 0.02% of its geographical area.

Sarda, a constituent panchayat of Contai II block, is located at 21°48′21″N 87°46′26″E.

Deshapran CD Block is bounded by Khejuri I and Khejuri II CD Block in the north, Bay of Bengal, in the east, Contai I CD Block in the south and Contai III CD Block in the west.

It is located 61 km from Tamluk, the district headquarters.

Deshapran CD Block has an area of 170.30 km^{2}. It has 1 panchayat samity, 8 gram panchayats, 128 gram sansads (village councils), 169 mouzas and 166 inhabited villages. Contai police station serves this block. Headquarters of this CD Block is at Dholmari.

Gram panchayats of Deshapran block/ panchayat samiti are: Amtalia, Aurai, Bamunia, Basantia, Chalti, Dariapur, Dhobaberia and Sarda.

== Demographics ==
=== Population ===
As per 2011 Census of India Deshopran (Contai II) CD Block had a total population of 176,393, all of which were rural. There were 90,937 (52%) males and 85,456 (48%) females. Population below 6 years was 20,310. Scheduled Castes numbered 17,432 (9.88%) and Scheduled Tribes numbered 111 (0.06%).

As per 2001 census, Contai II block had a total population of 153,041, out of which 78,792 were males and 74,249 were females. Contai II block registered a population growth of 15.23 per cent during the 1991-2001 decade. Decadal growth for the combined Midnapore district was 14.87 per cent. Decadal growth in West Bengal was 17.84 per cent.

Census Town in Deshapran CD Block (2011 census figure in brackets): Basantia (5,455).

Large villages (with 4,000+ population) in Deshapran CD Block (2011 census figures in brackets): Durmut (4,617) and Basudebberya (4,229).

Other villages in Deshapran CD Block (2011 census figures in brackets): Sarda (3,099), Purba Amtalia (1,878), Dakshin Amtalia (1,214), Amtalia (2,657), Dhobaberya (67), Bamuniya (2002), Chalti (2,261), Dariapur (1,375).

=== Literacy ===
As per 2011 census the total number of literates in Deshapran CD Block was 137,871 (88.33% of the population over 6 years) out of which 75,095 (54%) were males and 62,766 (46%) were females.

As per 2011 census, literacy in Purba Medinipur district was 87.02%. Purba Medinipur had the highest literacy amongst all the districts of West Bengal in 2011.

See also – List of West Bengal districts ranked by literacy rate

Literacy in CD blocks of
Purba Medinipur district
Tamluk subdivision
Tamluk – 87.06%
Sahid Matangini – 86.99%
Panskura I – 83.65%
Panskura II – 84.93%
Nandakumar – 85.56%
Chandipur – 87.81%
Moyna – 86.33%
Haldia subdivision
Mahishadal – 86.21%
Nandigram I – 84.89%
Nandigram II – 89.16%
Sutahata – 85.42%
Haldia – 85.96%
Contai subdivision
Contai I – 89.32%
Contai II – 88.33%
Contai III – 89.88%
Khejuri I – 88.90%
Khejuri II – 85.37%
Ramnagar I – 87.84%
Ramnagar II – 89.38%
Bhagabanpur II – 90.98%
Egra subdivision
Bhagabanpur I – 88.13%
Egra I – 82.83%
Egra II – 86.47%
Patashpur I – 86.58%
Patashpur II – 86.50%
2011 Census: CD Block Wise

Primary Census Abstract Data

=== Language and religion ===
Religion in Deshapran CD block (2011)
| Hinduism | 84.40% |
| Islam | 15.43% |
| Other or not stated | 0.17% |

In 2011 census Hindus numbered 148,883 and formed 84.40% of the population in Contai II CD Block. Muslims numbered 27,206 and formed 15.43% of the population. Others numbered 304 and formed 0.17% of the population. In 2001, Hindus made up 85.24% and Muslims 14.72% of the population respectively.

Languages of Deshapran CD block (2011)
1. Bengali (98.3%)
2. Khortha (0.98%)
3. Others (0.70%)

According to the 2011 census, 98.32% of the population spoke Bengali and 0.98% Khortha as their first language.

== Rural poverty ==
The District Human Development Report for Purba Medinipur has provided a CD Block-wise data table for Modified Human Poverty Index of the district. Deshapran CD Block registered 28.95 on the MHPI scale. The CD Block-wise mean MHPI was estimated at 24.78. Eleven out of twentyfive CD Blocks were found to be severely deprived in respect of grand CD Block average value of MHPI (CD Blocks with lower amount of poverty are better): All the CD Blocks of Haldia and Contai subdivisions appeared backward, except Ramnagar I & II, of all the blocks of Egra subdivision only Bhagabanpur I appeared backward and in Tamluk subdivision none appeared backward.

== Economy ==
=== Livelihood ===
In Deshapran CD Block in 2011, total workers formed 37.65% of the total population and amongst the class of total workers, cultivators formed 16.45%, agricultural labourers 36.73%, household industry workers 4.67% and other workers 42.15.%.

=== Petuaghat Fishing Harbour ===
Petuaghat Fishing Harbour at Petuaghat on the Rasulpur River, is the largest in the state and was the 7th largest in the country at the time of its inauguration in 2010. It is located about 25 km from Contai town. It has the capacity to handle 300 mechanised and 25 deep sea vessels. The harbour has three jetties and facilities such as auction hall, net mending shed, fish landing area, fishermen dormitory, electricity, water supply and compound wall.

=== Infrastructure ===
There are 166 inhabited villages in Deshapran CD block. All 166 villages (100%) have power supply. 165 villages (99.4%) have drinking water supply. 28 villages (16.17%) have post offices. 161 villages (96.99%) have telephones (including landlines, public call offices and mobile phones). 49 villages (29.52%) have a pucca (paved) approach road and 42 villages (25.30%) have transport communication (includes bus service, rail facility and navigable waterways). 16 villages (12.22%) have agricultural credit societies. 5 villages (3.01%) have banks.

In 2007-08, around 40% of rural households in the district had electricity.

In 2013-14, there were 71 fertiliser depots, 12 seed stores and 32 fair price shops in the CD Block.

=== Agriculture ===
Persons engaged in agriculture
in Deshapran CD Block
1. Bargadars (6.64%)
2. Patta holders (31.9%)
3. Small farmers (2.39%)
4. Marginal farmers (26.0%)
5. Agricultural labourers (33.0%)

According to the District Human Development Report of Purba Medinipur: The agricultural sector is the lifeline of a predominantly rural economy. It is largely dependent on the Low Capacity Deep Tubewells (around 50%) or High Capacity Deep Tubewells (around 27%) for irrigation, as the district does not have a good network of canals, compared to some of the neighbouring districts. In many cases the canals are drainage canals which get the backflow of river water at times of high tide or the rainy season. The average size of land holding in Purba Medinipur, in 2005-06, was 0.73 hectares against 1.01 hectares in West Bengal.

In 2013-14, the total area irrigated in Deshapran CD Block was 3,029 hectares, out of which 15 hectares were irrigated by canal water, 1,027 hectares by tank water, and 1,987 hectares by shallow tube well.

Although the Bargadari Act of 1950 recognised the rights of bargadars to a higher share of crops from the land that they tilled, it was not implemented fully. Large tracts, beyond the prescribed limit of land ceiling, remained with the rich landlords. From 1977 onwards major land reforms took place in West Bengal. Land in excess of land ceiling was acquired and distributed amongst the peasants. Following land reforms land ownership pattern has undergone transformation. In 2013-14, persons engaged in agriculture in Deshapran CD Block could be classified as follows: bargadars 6.64%, patta (document) holders 31.93%, small farmers (possessing land between 1 and 2 hectares) 2.39%, marginal farmers (possessing land up to 1 hectare) 26.03% and agricultural labourers 33.01%.

In 2013-14, Deshapran CD Block produced 15,788 tonnes of Aman paddy, the main winter crop, from 12,867 hectares, 6,195 tonnes of Boro paddy, the spring crop, from 1,796 hectares and 400 tonnes of potatoes from 15 hectares. It also produced oil seeds.

Betelvine is a major source of livelihood in Purba Medinipur district, particularly in Tamluk and Contai subdivisions. Betelvine production in 2008-09 was the highest amongst all the districts and was around a third of the total state production. In 2008-09, Purba Mednipur produced 2,789 tonnes of cashew nuts from 3,340 hectares of land.

Concentration of Handicraft Activities in CD Blocks
- Horn Craft - Kolaghat
- Pata Chitra - Chandipur, Nandakumar
- Sea Shell – Ramnagar I & II
- Mat & Mat Diversified Products – Ramnagar I, Egra I & II, Patashpur I
- Brass & Bell Metal – Ramnagar I, Mahisadal, Patashpur II, Egra I
- Diversified Jute Products – Ramnagar II, Nandakumar, Kolaghat, Shahid Matangini
- Cane & Bamboo Products - Chandipur, Nandakumar, Kolaghat, Shahid Matangini
- Sola Craft - Tamluk, Kolaghat
- Pottery/Terracotta - Panskura, Tamluk, Sahid Matangini, Nandakumar
- Wood Craft - Tamluk
- Zari work- Sutahta, Mahisadal, Haldia, Nandakumar

Source: District Human Development Report, Purba Medinipur, Page 97

=== Pisciculture ===
Purba Medinipur's net district domestic product derives one fifth of its earnings from fisheries, the highest amongst all the districts of West Bengal. The nett area available for effective pisciculture in Deshapran CD Block in 2013-14 was 675.19 hectares. 3,150 persons were engaged in the profession and approximate annual production was 25,725 quintals.

=== Banking ===
In 2013-14, Deshapran CD Block had offices of 6 commercial banks and 1 gramin bank.

=== Backward Regions Grant Fund ===
Medinipur East district is listed as a backward region and receives financial support from the Backward Regions Grant Fund. The fund, created by the Government of India, is designed to redress regional imbalances in development. As of 2012, 272 districts across the country were listed under this scheme. The list includes 11 districts of West Bengal.

== Transport ==
Deshapran CD Block has 3 ferry services, 6 originating/ terminating bus routes.

SH 5 starting from Rupnarayanpur (in Bardhaman district) terminates at Junput.

== Education ==
In 2013-14, Deshapran CD Block had 117 primary schools with 7,157 students, 18 middle schools with 1,075 students, 7 high schools with 4,707 students and 13 higher secondary schools with 15,124 students. Deshapran CD Block had 2 technical/ professional institution with 150 students and 295 institutions for special and non-formal education with 13,487 students.

As per the 2011 census, in Deshapran CD block, amongst the 166 inhabited villages, 30 villages did not have a school, 30 villages had two or more primary schools, 37 villages had at least 1 primary and 1 middle school and 17 villages had at least 1 middle and 1 secondary school.

Deshapran Mahavidyalaya at Durmut was established in 2010 and offers courses in arts.

== Healthcare ==
In 2014, Deshapran CD Block had 1 block primary health centre and 2 primary health centres with total 10 beds and 5 doctors (excluding private bodies). It had 27 family welfare sub centres. 2,163 patients were treated indoor and 96,446 patients were treated outdoor in the hospitals, health centres and subcentres of the CD Block.

Basantia Rural Hospital at Basantia (with 30 beds) is the main medical facility in Deshapran CD block. There are primary health centres at Barabantalia (with 15 beds) and Daulatpur, PO Dariapur (with 10 beds).
