= Contai subdivision =

Contai Subdivision
- Subdivision
- Interactive map of Contai Subdivision
- Coordinates: 21.78°N 87.75°E
- Country: India
- State: West Bengal
- District: Purba Medinipur
- Headquarters: Contai

Area
  - Total: 1,251.21 km^{2} (483.09 sq mi)

Population (2011)
  - Total: 1,385,307
  - Density: 1,107.17/km^{2} (2,867.57/sq mi)
- Demonym: Medinipuriya

Languages
  - Official: Bengali, English
- Time zone: UTC+5:30 (IST)
- ISO 3166 code: IN-WB
- Vehicle registration: WB 31, WB 32

Contai Subdivision is a subdivision of the Purba Medinipur district in the state of West Bengal, India.

== Subdivisions ==
Purba Medinipur district is divided into the following administrative subdivisions:

Subdivision	Headquarters	Area km^{2}	Population (2011)	Rural population % (2001)	Urban population % (2001)
Tamluk	Tamluk	1084.30	1,791,695	94.08	5.92
Haldia	Haldia	683.94	959,934	79.19	20.81
Egra	Egra	940.96	958,939	96.96	3.04
Contai	Contai	1251.21	1,385,307	93.55	6.45
Purba Medinipur district	Tamluk	4,713.00	5,095,875	91.71	8.29

== Administrative units ==
Cities and towns in Contai subdivision of Purba Medinipur district
M: municipal city/ town, CT: census town, R: rural/ urban centre, H: historical/ religious centre, S: port, sea-beach
Owing to space constraints in the small map, the actual locations in a larger map may vary slightly

Contai subdivision has 10 police stations, 8 community development blocks, 8 panchayat samitis, 61 gram panchayats, 1155 mouzas, 1129 inhabited villages, 1 municipality and 2 census towns. The municipality is: Contai. The census towns are: Khadalgobra and Basantia. The subdivision has its headquarters at Contai.

== Area ==
Contai subdivision has an area of 1,251.21 km^{2}, population in 2011 of 1,385,307 and density of population of 1,107 per km^{2}. 27.18% of the population of the district resides in this subdivision.

== Police stations ==
Police stations in Contai subdivision have the following features and jurisdiction:

Police station	Area covered km^{2} *	Inter-state border	Municipal town	CD block
Khejuri	268.47	-	-	Khejuri I, Khejuri II
Bhupatinagar	179.23	-	-	Bhagabanpur II
Contai	370.80	-	Contai	Contai I, Deshpran
Contai Women	Contai subdivision	-	-	-
Marishda	155.52	-	-	Contai III
Ramnagar	286.02	Border with Balasore district in Odisha	-	Ramnagar I (part), Ramnagar II
Digha	3,153	-	-	Ramnagar I (part)
Digha Mohana Coastal	-	-	-	-
Patulighat (Junput) Coastal				
Talpatighat Coastal				

- The data is as per the website of Purba Medinipur Police, but it appears that it has not been updated/ corrected for a long time

== Blocks ==
Community development blocks in Contai subdivision are:

CD Block	Headquarters	Area km^{2}	Population (2011)	SC %	ST %	Literacy rate %	Census Towns
Khejuri I	Kamarda	130.51	132,992	13.34	0.13	88.90	-
Khejuri II	Janka	137.46	139,463	56.75	0.65	85.37	-
Bhagabanpur II	Bhupatinagar	180.20	192,162	11.19	0.08	90.98	-
Ramnagar I	Ramnagar	139.43	167,330	13.18	0.46	87.84	1
Ramnagar II	Bara Bankuya	163.27	156,054	13.96	0.19	89.38	-
Contai I	Contai	155.27	170,894	13.79	0.05	89.32	-
Deshapran	Dholmari	170.30	176,393	9.88	0.06	88.33	1
Contai III	Marishda	160.52	157,793	13.20	0.09	89.88	-

== Gram panchayats ==
The subdivision contains 61 gram panchayats under 8 community development blocks:

- Contai I block: Badalpur, Mahisagot, Raipur–Paschimbarh, Dulalpur, Majilapur, Sabajput, Haipur and Nayaput.
- Deshapran block: Amtalia, Bamunia, Chalti, Dhobaberia, Aurai, Basantia, Dariyapur and Sarda.
- Contai III block: Bhajachauli, Durmuth, Kumirda, Lauda, Debendra, Kanaidighi, Kusumpur and Marishda.
- Bhagabanpur II block: Arjunnagar, Garbari–I, Jukhia, Baroj, Garbari–II, Mugberia, Basudevberia, Itaberia and Radhapur.
- Khejuri I block: Beerbandar, Kalagechia, Lakshmi, Henria, Kamarda and Tikashi.
- Khejuri II block: Bartala, Janka, Niz Kasba, Haludbari and Khejuri.
- Ramnagar I block: Badhia, Haldia–I, Padima–II, Basantapur, Haldia–II, Talgachhari–I, Gobra, Padima–I and Talgachhari–II.
- Ramnagar II block: Badalpur, Depal, Kalindi, Paldui, Balisai, Kadua, Maithana and Satilapur.

== Education ==
With a literacy rate of 87.66% Purba Medinipur district ranked first amongst all districts of West Bengal in literacy as per the provisional figures of the census of India 2011. Within Purba Medinipur district, Tamluk subdivision had a literacy rate of 85.98%, Haldia subdivision 86.67%, Egra subdivision 86.18% and Contai subdivision 89.19%. All CD Blocks and municipalities in the district had literacy levels above 80%.

Given in the table below (data in numbers) is a comprehensive picture of the education scenario in Purba Medinipur district for the year 2013-14. It may be noted that primary schools include junior basic schools; middle schools, high schools and higher secondary schools include madrasahs; technical schools include junior technical schools, junior government polytechnics, industrial technical institutes, industrial training centres, nursing training institutes etc.; technical and professional colleges include engineering colleges, polytechnics, medical colleges, para-medical institutes, management colleges, teachers training and nursing training colleges, law colleges, art colleges, music colleges etc. Special and non-formal education centres include sishu siksha kendras, madhyamik siksha kendras, centres of Rabindra mukta vidyalaya, recognised Sanskrit tols, institutions for the blind and other handicapped persons, Anganwadi centres, reformatory schools etc.

Subdivision	Primary School		Middle School		High School		Higher Secondary School		General College, Univ		Technical / Professional Instt		Non-formal Education	
Subdivision	Institution	Student	Institution	Student	Institution	Student	Institution	Student	Institution	Student	Institution	Student	Institution	Student
Tamluk	1,084	84,258	78	5,789	77	43,408	144	171,516	6	12,728	17	2,747	2,704	112,411
Haldia	557	43,173	40	5,082	54	36,767	77	83,659	5	9,792	16	6,256	1,359	59,879
Egra	629	41,418	76	11,537	49	32,167	74	90,730	3	9,498	2	154	1,595	62,200
Contai	983	50,945	99	10,557	81	46,690	102	120,128	5	12,223	10	1,602	2,316	90,552
Purba Medinipur district	3,253	219,794	293	32,965	261	159,032	397	466,093	19	44,241	45	10,759	7,974	375,042

The following institutions are located in Contai subdivision:

- Mugberia Gangadhar Mahavidyalaya at Mugberia, near Bhupatinagar in Bhagabanpur II CD Block was established in 1964. In addition to the courses in arts, science and commerce, it offers degree and post-graduate courses in physical education.
- Ramnagar College at Depal in Ramnagar II CD Block was established in 1972. In addition to courses in arts, science and commerce, it offers courses in hospitality and tourism, and fishery and farm management.
- Ramnagar B.Ed College at Depal in Ramnagar II CD Block offers B.Ed. course.
- Khejuri College at Baratala in Khejuri II CD Block was established in 1999. In addition to courses in arts, it offers a course in Aquaculture Management and Technology.
- Prabhat Kumar College (also known as Kanthi College) at Contai was established in 1926. Apart from courses in arts, science and commerce, it offers B.Ed. and M.Sc. course in Physics.
- Contai Polytechnic at Raghurampur PO Darua.
- Raghunath Ayurved Mahavidyalaya and Hospital, Contai.
- Deshapran Mahavidyalaya at Durmut in Deshapran CD Block was established in 2010 and offers courses in arts.

== Healthcare ==
The table below (all data in numbers) presents an overview of the medical facilities available and patients treated in the hospitals, health centres and sub-centres in 2014 in Purba Medinipur district.

Subdivision	Health & Family Welfare Deptt, WB				Other State Govt Deptts	Local bodies	Central Govt Deptts / PSUs	NGO / Private Nursing Homes	Total	Total Number of Beds	Total Number of Doctors	Indoor Patients	Outdoor Patients
Subdivision	Hospitals	Rural Hospitals	Block Primary Health Centres	Primary Health Centres	Other State Govt Deptts	Local bodies	Central Govt Deptts / PSUs	NGO / Private Nursing Homes	Total	Total Number of Beds	Total Number of Doctors	Indoor Patients	Outdoor Patients
Tamluk	1	-	7	14	-	-	-	70	92	1,506	96	61,84	1,251,099
Haldia	1	2	3	10	-	-	-	19	35	803	67	27,586	757,876
Egra	1	1	4	11	-	-	-	21	38	489	42	23,699	419,829
Contai	2	-	8	16	-	-	-	22	48	688	88	59,882	890,607
Purba Medinipur district	5	3	22	51	-	-	-	132	213	3,486	293	172,251	3,319,411

Medical facilities available in Contai subdivision are as follows:

Hospitals: (Name, location, beds)
Contai Subdivision Hospital, Contai, 141 beds
Digha State General Hospital, Digha, 50 beds
Rural Hospitals: (Name, CD block, location, beds)
Basantia Rural Hospital, Deshapran CD block, Basantia, 30 beds
Bhupatinagar Mugberia Rural Hospital, Bhagabanpur II CD block, Bhupatinagar, 30 beds
Silaberia Rural Hospital, Khejuri II CD block, Silaberia, 30 beds
Bararankura Rural Hospital, Ramnagar II CD block, PO Balisai, 30 beds
Block Primary Health Centre: (Name, block, location, beds)
Majna BPHC, Contai I CD block, Majna, 15 beds
Kharipukuria BPHC, Contai III CD block, Kharipukuria, PO Nachinda Bazar, 10 beds
Kamarda BPHC, Khejuri I CD block, Kamarda Bazar, 15 beds
Digha Aghore Kamini BPHC, Ramnagar I CD block, Digha, 15 beds
Primary Health Centres: (CD block-wise)(CD block, PHC location, beds)
Contai I CD block: Kulberia (6), Nayaput (10)
Deshapran CD block: Barabantalia (15), Daulatpur, PO Dariapur (10)
Contai III CD block: Banamalichatta (10), Bhaitgarh (?), Deulbarh (2)
Bhagabanpur II CD block: Barberia (10), Simulia (6)
Khejuri I CD block: Heria (10)
Khejuri II CD block: Janka (10)
Ramnagar I CD block: Chandanpur (10), Gobra (6), Sadihat (6), Pichhaboni, PO Chowlkhola (10)
Ramnagar II CD block: Nijmaithula, PO Batatala (10), Hamirpur, PO Depal (2)

== Electoral constituencies ==
Lok Sabha (parliamentary) and Vidhan Sabha (state assembly) constituencies in Purba Medinipur district were as follows:

Lok Sabha constituency	Vidhan Sabha constituency	Reservation	CD Block and/or Gram panchayats
Ghatal	Panskura Paschim	None	Panskura CD Block
	Other assembly segments in Paschim Medinipur district		
Tamluk	Tamluk	None	Tamluk municipality, Bishnubarh II, Pipulberia I, Pipulberia II and Uttar Sonamui gram panchayats of Tamluk CD Block, and Sahid Matangini CD Block
	Panskura Purba	None	Kolaghat CD Block
	Moyna	None	Moyna CD Block, Anantapur I, Anantapur II, Nilkunthia, Sreerampur I and Sreerampur II GPs of Tamluk CD Block
	Nandakumar	None	Nandakumar CD Block and Bishnubarh I, Padumpur I and Padumpur II GPs of Tamluk CD Block
	Mahisadal	None	Mahisadal and Haldia CD Blocks
	Haldia	SC	Haldia municipality and Sutahata CD Block
	Nandigram	None	Nandigram I and Nandigram II CD Blocks
Kanthi	Chandipur	None	Chandipur CD Block and Benodia, Bivisanpur, Gurgram, Kakra, Mahammadpur I and Mahammadpur II GPs of Bhagabanpur I CD Block
	Patashpur	None	Patashpur I CD Block; Khargram, Panchet, Pataspur, South Khanda and Sreerampur gram panchayats of Patashpur II CD Block
	Kanthi Uttar	None	Deshapran CD Block, Brajachauli, Debendra, Kanaidighi, Kumirda, Lauda and Marishda GPs of Contai III CD Block and Bathuari GP of Egra II CD Block
	Bhagabanpur	None	Bhagabanpur, Kajlagarh, Kotbarh and Shimulia GPs of Bhagabanpur I CD Block, Arjunnagar, Basudevberia, Baroj, Itaberia, Jukhia, Mugberia and Radhapur GPs of Bhagabanpur II CD Block, and Argoyal and Mathura GPs of Patashpur II CD Block
	Khejuri	SC	Khejuri I and Khejuri II CD Blocks, and Garbari I and Garbari II GPs of Bhagabanpur II CD Block
	Kanthi Dakshin	None	Contai municipality, Contai I CD Block, and Durmuth and Kusumpur GPs of Contai III CD Block
	Ramnagar	None	Ramnagar I and Ramnagar II CD Blocks
