= Khadalgobra =

- Census Town
- Location in West Bengal, India Khadalgobra (India)
- Coordinates: 21.627667°N 87.522178°E
- Country: India
- State: West Bengal
- District: Purba Medinipur

Area
  - Total: 2.1858 km^{2} (0.8439 sq mi)

Population (2011)
  - Total: 5,344
  - Density: 2,445/km^{2} (6,332/sq mi)

Languages
  - Official: Bengali, English
- Time zone: UTC+5:30 (IST)
- Lok Sabha constituency: Kanthi
- Vidhan Sabha constituency: Ramnagar
- Website: purbamedinipur.gov.in

Khadalgobra is a census town in Ramnagar I CD block in Contai subdivision of Purba Medinipur district in the state of West Bengal, India.

== Geography ==
Cities and towns in Contai subdivision of Purba Medinipur district
M: municipal city/ town, CT: census town, R: rural/ urban centre, H: historical and religious centre, S: port, sea-beach
Owing to space constraints in the small map, the actual locations in a larger map may vary slightly

=== Location ===
Khadalgobra is located at 21.627667°N 87.522178°E.

=== Urbanisation ===
93.55% of the population of Contai subdivision live in the rural areas. Only 6.45% of the population live in the urban areas and it is considerably behind Haldia subdivision in urbanization, where 20.81% of the population live in urban areas.

Note: The map alongside presents some of the notable locations in the subdivision. All places marked in the map are linked in the larger full screen map.

== Demographics ==
As per 2011 Census of India Khadalgobra had a total population of 5,344 of which 2,736 (51%) were males and 2,608 (49%) were females. Population below 6 years was 574. The total number of literates in Khadalgobra was 4,074 (85.41% of the population over 6 years).

== Infrastructure ==
As per the District Census Handbook 2011, Khadalgobra covered an area of 2.1858 km^{2}. It had the facility of a railway station at New Digha close by and bus routes in the town. Amongst the civic amenities it had 550 domestic electric connections. Amongst the educational facilities it had were 2 primary schools and 1 middle school. The nearest secondary school and senior secondary school are at South Simulia 1.5 km away. The nearest degree college was at Depal 14 km away.

== Transport ==
Khadalgobra is on National Highway 116B.
