= Bhagabanpur II =

- Community development block
- Coordinates: 21.9537132°N 87.7234268°E
- Country: India
- State: West Bengal
- District: Purba Medinipur

Government
  - Type: Community development block

Area
  - Total: 180.20 km^{2} (69.58 sq mi)
- Elevation: 5 m (16 ft)

Population (2011)
  - Total: 192,162
  - Density: 1,066.4/km^{2} (2,761.9/sq mi)

Languages
  - Official: Bengali, English
- Time zone: UTC+5:30 (IST)
- PIN: 721425 (Bhupatinagar)
- Area code: 03228
- ISO 3166 code: IN-WB
- Vehicle registration: WB-29, WB-30, WB-31, WB-32, WB-33
- Literacy: 90.98%
- Lok Sabha constituency: Kanthi
- Vidhan Sabha constituency: Bhagabanpur, Khejuri
- Website: purbamedinipur.gov.in

Bhagabanpur II (also spelt as Bhagawanpur) is a community development block that forms an administrative division in the Contai subdivision of Purba Medinipur district in the Indian state of West Bengal.

== Geography ==
Purba Medinipur district is part of the lower Indo-Gangetic Plain and Eastern coastal plains. Topographically, the district can be divided into two parts – (a) almost entirely flat plains on the west, east and north, (b) the coastal plains on the south. The vast expanse of land is formed of alluvium and is composed of younger and coastal alluvial. The elevation of the district is within 10 metres above mean sea level. The district has a long coastline of 65.5 km along its southern and south eastern boundary. Five coastal CD Blocks, namely, Khejuri II, Contai II (Deshapran), Contai I, Ramnagar I and II, are occasionally affected by cyclones and tornadoes. Tidal floods are quite regular in these five CD Blocks. Normally floods occur in 21 of the 25 CD Blocks in the district. The major rivers are Haldi, Rupnarayan, Rasulpur, Bagui and Keleghai, flowing in north to south or south-east direction. River water is an important source of irrigation. The district has a low 899 hectare forest cover, which is 0.02% of its geographical area.

Bhupatinagar is located at 21°57′13″N 87°43′24″E.

Bhagabanpur II CD Block is bounded by Bhagabanpur I and Chandipur CD Blocks in the north, Nandigram II and Khejuri I CD Blocks in the east, Contai III and Egra II CD Blocks in the south and Patashpur I and Patashpur II CD Blocks in the west.

It is located 35 km from Tamluk, the district headquarters.

Bhagabanpur II CD Block has an area of 180.20 km^{2}. It has 1 panchayat samity, 9 gram panchayats, 142 gram sansads (village councils), 168 mouzas and 167 inhabited villages. Bhupatinagar police station serves this block. Headquarters of this CD Block is at Bhupatinagar.

Gram panchayats of Bhagabanpur II block/ panchayat samiti are: Arjunnagar, Basudevberia, Boroj, Garbari I, Garbari II, Itaberia, Jukhia, Mugberia and Radhapur.

== Demographics ==
=== Population ===
As per 2011 Census of India Bhagawanpur II CD Block had a total population of 192,162, all of which were rural. There were 99,060 (52%) males and 93,102 (48%) females. Population below 6 years was 21,511. Scheduled Castes numbered 33,911 (11.19%) and Scheduled Tribes numbered 147 (0.08%).

As per 2001 census, Bhagabanpur II block had a total population of 167,181, out of which 85,434 were males and 81,747 were females. Bhagabanpur II block registered a population growth of 15.78 per cent during the 1991–2001 decade. Decadal growth for the combined Midnapore district was 14.87%. Decadal growth in West Bengal was 17.84%.

Large villages (with 4,000+ population) in Bhagabanpur II CD Block (2011 census figures in brackets): Bahadurpur (5,205), Kismat Bajkul (17,964), Jukhia (4,291) and Bhupatinagar (5,149).

Other villages in Bhagabanpur II CD Block (2011 census figures in brackets): Ita Baria (3,758), Basudeb Berya (3,321), Dakshin Baroj Part I (278), Dakshin Baroj Part II (1,517) and Uttar Baroj (1,247).

=== Literacy ===
As per 2011 census the total number of literates in Bhagabanpur II CD Block was 155,251 (90.98% of the population over 6 years) out of which 83,947 (54%) were males and 71,304 (46%) were females. The literacy rate of Bhagabanpur II CD Block is the highest amongst all CD Blocks in Purba Medinipur district.

As per 2011 census, literacy in Purba Medinipur district was 87.02%. Purba Medinipur had the highest literacy amongst all the districts of West Bengal in 2011.

See also – List of West Bengal districts ranked by literacy rate

Literacy in CD blocks of
Purba Medinipur district
Tamluk subdivision
Tamluk – 87.06%
Sahid Matangini – 86.99%
Panskura I – 83.65%
Panskura II – 84.93%
Nandakumar – 85.56%
Chandipur – 87.81%
Moyna – 86.33%
Haldia subdivision
Mahishadal – 86.21%
Nandigram I – 84.89%
Nandigram II – 89.16%
Sutahata – 85.42%
Haldia – 85.96%
Contai subdivision
Contai I – 89.32%
Contai II – 88.33%
Contai III – 89.88%
Khejuri I – 88.90%
Khejuri II – 85.37%
Ramnagar I – 87.84%
Ramnagar II – 89.38%
Bhagabanpur II – 90.98%
Egra subdivision
Bhagabanpur I – 88.13%
Egra I – 82.83%
Egra II – 86.47%
Patashpur I – 86.58%
Patashpur II – 86.50%
2011 Census: CD Block Wise

Primary Census Abstract Data

=== Language and religion ===
Religion in Bhagabanpur II CD block (2011)
Hinduism	97.61%
Islam	2.17%
Other or not stated	0.22%

In 2011 census Hindus numbered 187,575 and formed 97.61% of the population in Bhagabanpur II CD Block. Muslims numbered 4,161 and formed 2.17% of the population. Others numbered 426 and formed 0.22% of the population. In 2001, Hindus made up 97.89% and Muslims 2.00% of the population respectively.

Bengali is the predominant language, spoken by 99.58% of the population.

== Rural poverty ==
The District Human Development Report for Purba Medinipur has provided a CD Block-wise data table for Modified Human Poverty Index of the district. Bhagabanpur II CD Block registered 22.26 on the MHPI scale. The CD Block-wise mean MHPI was estimated at 24.78. Eleven out of twentyfive CD Blocks were found to be severely deprived in respect of grand CD Block average value of MHPI (CD Blocks with lower amount of poverty are better): All the CD Blocks of Haldia and Contai subdivisions appeared backward, except Ramnagar I & II, of all the blocks of Egra subdivision only Bhagabanpur I appeared backward and in Tamluk subdivision none appeared backward.

== Economy ==
=== Livelihood ===
In Bhagabanpur II CD Block in 2011, total workers formed 37.81% of the total population and amongst the class of total workers, cultivators formed 16.28%, agricultural labourers 50.37%, household industry workers 3.37% and other workers 29.98.%.

=== Infrastructure ===
There are 167 inhabited villages in Bhagabanpur II CD block. All 167 villages (100%) have power supply. 160 villages (95.81%) have drinking water supply. 28 villages (16.77%) have post offices. 159 villages (95.21%) have telephones (including landlines, public call offices and mobile phones). 38 villages (22.75%) have a pucca (paved) approach road and 50 villages (29.94%) have transport communication (includes bus service, rail facility and navigable waterways). 40 villages (23.95%) have agricultural credit societies. 10 villages (5.99%) have banks.

In 2007-08, around 40% of rural households in the district had electricity.

In 2013-14, there were 46 fertiliser depots, 3 seed stores and 28 fair price shops in the CD Block.

=== Agriculture ===
Persons engaged in agriculture
in Bhagabanpur II CD Block
1. Bargadars (12.6%)
2. Patta holders (18.9%)
3. Small farmers (1.17%)
4. Marginal farmers (25.2%)
5. Agricultural labourers (42.1%)

According to the District Human Development Report of Purba Medinipur: The agricultural sector is the lifeline of a predominantly rural economy. It is largely dependent on the Low Capacity Deep Tubewells (around 50%) or High Capacity Deep Tubewells (around 27%) for irrigation, as the district does not have a good network of canals, compared to some of the neighbouring districts. In many cases the canals are drainage canals which get the backflow of river water at times of high tide or the rainy season. The average size of land holding in Purba Medinipur, in 2005-06, was 0.73 hectares against 1.01 hectares in West Bengal.

In 2013-14, the total area irrigated in Bhagabanpur II CD Block was 9,216 hectares, out of which 630 hectares were irrigated by canal water, 2,695 hectares by tank water (there were 10,498 tanks in Bhagabanpur II CD Block), 5,729 hectares by deep tube well and 162 hectares by shallow tube well.

Although the Bargadari Act of 1950 recognised the rights of bargadars to a higher share of crops from the land that they tilled, it was not implemented fully. Large tracts, beyond the prescribed limit of land ceiling, remained with the rich landlords. From 1977 onwards major land reforms took place in West Bengal. Land in excess of land ceiling was acquired and distributed amongst the peasants. Following land reforms land ownership pattern has undergone transformation. In 2013-14, persons engaged in agriculture in Bhagabanpur II CD Block could be classified as follows: bargadars 12.63%, patta (document) holders 18.87%, small farmers (possessing land between 1 and 2 hectares) 1.17%, marginal farmers (possessing land up to 1 hectare) 25.24% and agricultural labourers 42.09%.

In 2013-14, Bhagabanpur II CD Block produced 1,529 tonnes of Aman paddy, the main winter crop, from 2,715 hectares, 30,586 tonnes of Boro paddy, the spring crop, from 11,121 hectares, 718 tonnes of jute from 53 acres and 1,231 tonnes of potatoes from 70 hectares. It also produced pulses and oilseeds.

Betelvine is a major source of livelihood in Purba Medinipur district, particularly in Tamluk and Contai subdivisions. Betelvine production in 2008-09 was the highest amongst all the districts and was around a third of the total state production. In 2008-09, Purba Mednipur produced 2,789 tonnes of cashew nuts from 3,340 hectares of land.

Concentration of Handicraft Activities in CD Blocks
- Horn Craft - Kolaghat
- Pata Chitra - Chandipur, Nandakumar
- Sea Shell – Ramnagar I & II
- Mat & Mat Diversified Products – Ramnagar I, Egra I & II, Patashpur I
- Brass & Bell Metal – Ramnagar I, Mahisadal, Patashpur II, Egra I
- Diversified Jute Products – Ramnagar II, Nandakumar, Kolaghat, Shahid Matangini
- Cane & Bamboo Products - Chandipur, Nandakumar, Kolaghat, Shahid Matangini
- Sola Craft - Tamluk, Kolaghat
- Pottery/Terracotta - Panskura, Tamluk, Sahid Matangini, Nandakumar
- Wood Craft - Tamluk
- Zari work- Sutahta, Mahisadal, Haldia, Nandakumar

Source: District Human Development Report, Purba Medinipur, Page 97

=== Pisciculture ===
Purba Medinipur's net district domestic product derives one fifth of its earnings from fisheries, the highest amongst all the districts of West Bengal. The nett area available for effective pisciculture in Bhagabanpur II CD Block in 2013-14 was 877.95 hectares. 5,050 persons were engaged in the profession and approximate annual production was 33,450 quintals.

=== Banking ===
In 2013-14, Bhagabanpur II CD Block had offices of 6 commercial banks and 3 gramin banks.

=== Backward Regions Grant Fund ===
Medinipur East district is listed as a backward region and receives financial support from the Backward Regions Grant Fund. The fund, created by the Government of India, is designed to redress regional imbalances in development. As of 2012, 272 districts across the country were listed under this scheme. The list includes 11 districts of West Bengal.

== Transport ==
Bhagabanpur II CD Block has 2 ferry services, 10 originating/ terminating bus routes. The nearest railway station is 8 km from the CD Block headquarters.

== Education ==
In 2013-14, Bhagabnpur II CD Block had 153 primary schools with 8,699 students, 9 middle schools with 2,202 students, 12 high schools with 6,541 students and 20 higher secondary schools with 17,434 students. Bhagabanpur II CD Block had 1 general college with 1,922 students, 3 technical/ professional institutions with 200 students, 273 institutions for special and non-formal education with 12,855 students.

As per the 2011 census, in Bhagabanpur II CD block, amongst the 167 inhabited villages, 27 villages did not have a school, 46 villages had two or more primary schools, 43 villages had at least 1 primary and 1 middle school and 32 villages had at least 1 middle and 1 secondary school.

Mugberia Gangadhar Mahavidyalaya at Mugberia, near Bhupatinagar was established in 1964. In addition to the courses in arts, science and commerce, it offers degree and post-graduate courses in physical education.

== Healthcare ==
In 2014, Bhagabanpur II CD Block had 1 block primary health centre, 2 primary health centres and 6 private nursing homes with total 95 beds and 4 doctors (excluding private bodies). It had 29 family welfare sub centres. 7,302 patients were treated indoor and 94,408 patients were treated outdoor in the hospitals, health centres and subcentres of the CD Block.

Bhupatinagar Mugberia Rural Hospital at Bhupatinagar (with 30 beds) is the main medical facility in Bhagabanpur II CD block. There are primary health centres at Barberia (with 10 beds) and Simulia (with 6 beds).
