= Bara Bankuya =

- Village
- Location in West Bengal, India Bara Bankuya (India)
- Coordinates: 21°40′46.6″N 87°35′24.7″E
- Country: India
- State: West Bengal
- District: Purba Medinipur

Population (2011)
  - Total: 6,169

Languages
  - Official: Bengali, English
- Time zone: UTC+5:30 (IST)
- PIN: 721423 (Balisai)
- Telephone/STD code: 03229
- Lok Sabha constituency: Kanthi
- Vidhan Sabha constituency: Ramnagar
- Website: purbamedinipur.gov.in

Bara Bankuya (also called Bararankuya) is a village, in Ramnagar II CD block in Contai subdivision of Purba Medinipur district in the state of West Bengal, India.

== Geography ==
Cities and towns in Contai subdivision of Purba Medinipur district
M: municipal city/ town, CT: census town, R: rural/ urban centre, H: historical/ religious centre, S: port, sea-beach
Owing to space constraints in the small map, the actual locations in a larger map may vary slightly

=== Location ===
Bara Bankuya is located at 21°40′46.6″N 87°35′24.7″E

=== CD block HQ ===
The headquarters of Ramnagar II CD block are located at Bara Bankuya.

=== Urbanisation ===
93.55% of the population of Contai subdivision live in the rural areas. Only 6.45% of the population live in the urban areas and it is considerably behind Haldia subdivision in urbanization, where 20.81% of the population live in urban areas.

Note: The map alongside presents some of the notable locations in the subdivision. All places marked in the map are linked in the larger full screen map.

== Demographics ==
As per 2011 Census of India Bara Bankuya had a total population of 6,169 of which 3,077 (50%) were males and 3,092 (50%) were females. Population below 6 years was 676. The total number of literates in Bara Bankuya was 4,919 (89.55% of the population over 6 years).

== Transport ==
SH 4 connecting Jhalda (in Purulia district) and Digha (in Purba Medinipur district) passes through Bara Bankuya.

== Healthcare ==
Bararankura Rural Hospital, at Bararankura, PO Balisai (with 30 beds) is the main medical facility in Ramnagar II CD block. There are primary health centres at Nijmaithula, PO Batatala (with 10 seats) and Hamirpur, PO Depal (with 2 seats).
