= Bali Pukhuria =

- Village
- Location in West Bengal, India Bali Pukhuria (India)
- Coordinates: 21.7338°N 87.5501°E
- Country: India
- State: West Bengal
- District: Purba Medinipur

Population (2011)
  - Total: 564

Languages
  - Official: Bengali, English
- Time zone: UTC+5:30 (IST)
- PIN: 721433 (Bali Pukhuria)
- Lok Sabha constituency: Kanthi
- Vidhan Sabha constituency: Ramnagar

Bali Pukhuria is a village located in Ramnagar II Block in the Purba Medinipur district in the state of West Bengal, India.
