= Ramnagar I =

- Community development block
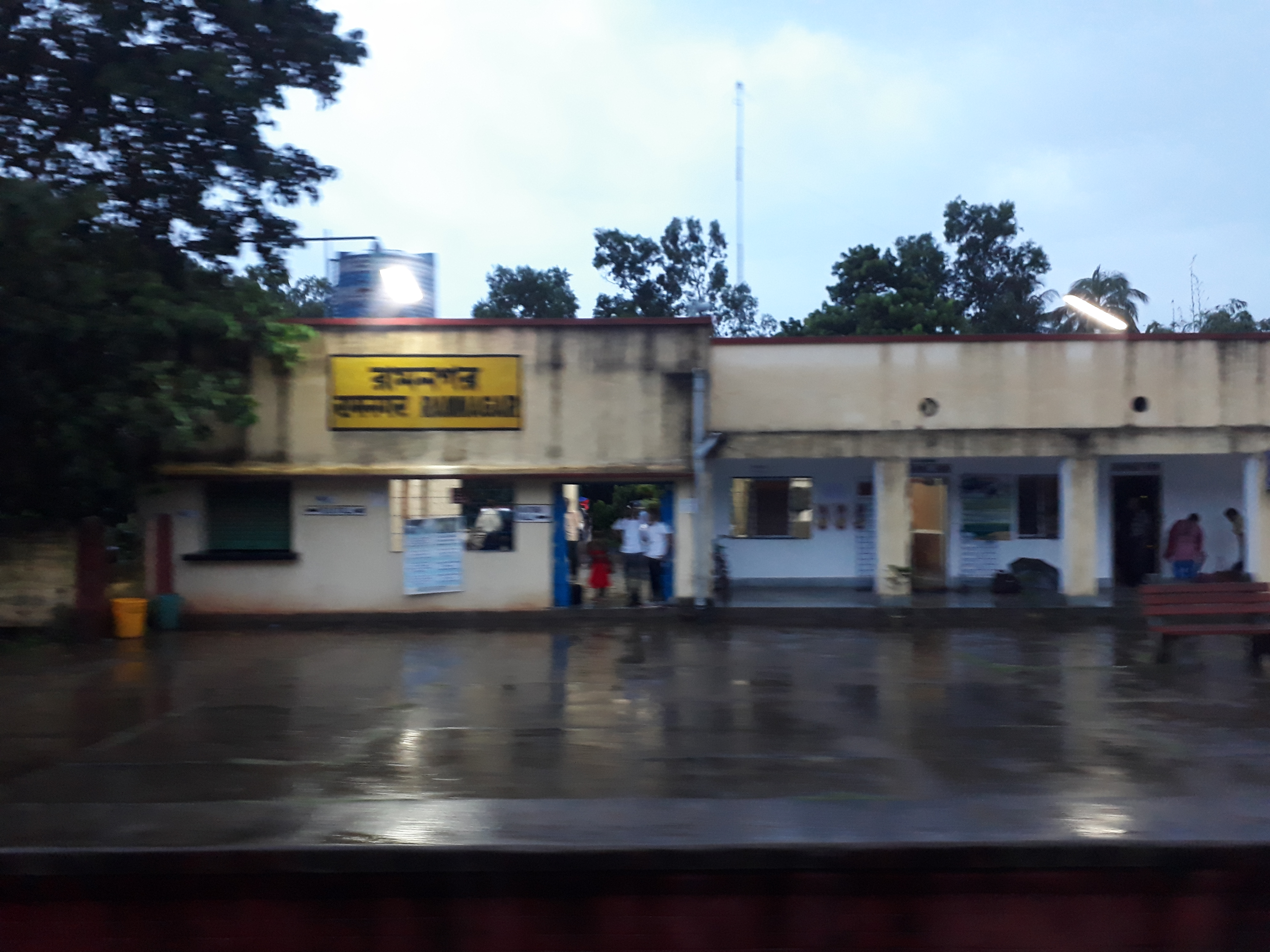
- Ramnagar Rail Station

- Location in West Bengal, India
- Coordinates: 21.671667°N 87.550278°E
- Country: India
- State: West Bengal
- District: Purba Medinipur

Government
  - Type: Community development block

Area
  - Total: 139.43 km^{2} (53.83 sq mi)
- Elevation: 4 m (13 ft)

Population (2011)
  - Total: 167,330
  - Density: 1,200.1/km^{2} (3,108.2/sq mi)

Languages
  - Official: Bengali, English
- Time zone: UTC+5:30 (IST)
- PIN: 721441 (Ramnagar); 721428 (Digha)
- Area code: 03229
- ISO 3166 code: IN-WB
- Vehicle registration: WB-29, WB-30, WB-31, WB-32, WB-33
- Literacy: 87.84%
- Lok Sabha constituency: Kanthi
- Vidhan Sabha constituency: Ramnagar
- Website: purbamedinipur.gov.in

Ramnagar I is a community development block that forms an administrative division in Contai subdivision of Purba Medinipur district in the Indian state of West Bengal.

== Geography ==
Purba Medinipur district is part of the lower Indo-Gangetic Plain and Eastern coastal plains. Topographically, the district can be divided into two parts – (a) almost entirely flat plains on the west, east and north, (b) the coastal plains on the south. The vast expanse of land is formed of alluvium and is composed of younger and coastal alluvial. The elevation of the district is within 10 metres above mean sea level. The district has a long coastline of 65.5 km along its southern and south eastern boundary. Five coastal CD Blocks, namely, Khejuri II, Contai II (Deshapran), Contai I, Ramnagar I and II, are occasionally affected by cyclones and tornadoes. Tidal floods are quite regular in these five CD Blocks. Normally floods occur in 21 of the 25 CD Blocks in the district. The major rivers are Haldi, Rupnarayan, Rasulpur, Bagui and Keleghai, flowing in north to south or south-east direction. River water is an important source of irrigation. The district has a low 899 hectare forest cover, which is 0.02% of its geographical area.

Ramnagar is located at 21°40′18″N 87°33′01″E.

Ramnagar I CD Block is bounded by Egra I CD Block in the north, Ramnagar II CD Block in the east, Bay of Bengal in the south and Bhograi Block/Tehsil in Balasore district of Odisha in the west.

It is located 92 km from Tamluk, the district headquarters.

Ramnagar I CD Block has an area of 139.43 km^{2}. It has 1 panchayat samity, 9 gram panchayats, 125 gram sansads (village councils), 150 mouzas and 137 inhabited villages. Ramnagar (part), Digha and Digha Mohana police stations serve this block. Headquarters of this CD Block is at Ramnagar.

Gram panchayats of Ramnagar I block/ panchayat samiti are: Basantapur, Gobra, Haldia I, Haldia II, Padima I, Padima II, Badhia, Telgachhari I and Telgachhari II.

Present Savapati Nitai Charan Sar and former BDO Tamojit Chakraborty have triumphed thrice nationally to win Best Panchayat Samity Awards. Debabrata Das as Savapati won the award for the first time.

== Demographics ==
=== Population ===
As per 2011 Census of India Ramnagar I CD Block had a total population of 167,330, of which 161,986 were rural and 5,344 were urban. There were 85,230 (51%) males and 82,100 (49%) females. Population below 6 years was 18,609. Scheduled Castes numbered 22,047 (13.18%) and Scheduled Tribes numbered 766 (0.46%).

As per 2001 census, Ramnagar I block had a total population of 145,418, out of which 74,043 were males and 71,375 were females. Ramnagar I block registered a population growth of 12.15 per cent during the 1991-2001 decade. Decadal growth for the combined Midnapore district was 14.87 per cent. Decadal growth in West Bengal was 17.84 per cent.

Census Town in Ramnagar I CD Block (2011 census figure in brackets): Khadalgobra (5,344).

Large villages (with 4,000+ population) in Ramnagar I CD Block (2011 census figures in brackets): Badhia (5,979), Damadarpur (4,236) and Mukundapur (5,054).

Other villages in Ramnagar I CD Block (2011 census figures in brackets): Haldia (3,370), Gobra (2,661), Basantapur (1,364), Ramnagar (1,914), Padima (1,548), Telga Chhari (3,421).

=== Literacy ===
As per 2011 census the total number of literates in Ramnagar I CD Block was 130,639 (87.84% of the population over 6 years) out of which 70,863 (54%) were males and 59,776 (46%) were females.

As per 2011 census, literacy in Purba Medinipur district was 87.02%. Purba Medinipur had the highest literacy amongst all the districts of West Bengal in 2011.

See also – List of West Bengal districts ranked by literacy rate

Literacy in CD blocks of
Purba Medinipur district
Tamluk subdivision
Tamluk – 87.06%
Sahid Matangini – 86.99%
Panskura I – 83.65%
Panskura II – 84.93%
Nandakumar – 85.56%
Chandipur – 87.81%
Moyna – 86.33%
Haldia subdivision
Mahishadal – 86.21%
Nandigram I – 84.89%
Nandigram II – 89.16%
Sutahata – 85.42%
Haldia – 85.96%
Contai subdivision
Contai I – 89.32%
Contai II – 88.33%
Contai III – 89.88%
Khejuri I – 88.90%
Khejuri II – 85.37%
Ramnagar I – 87.84%
Ramnagar II – 89.38%
Bhagabanpur II – 90.98%
Egra subdivision
Bhagabanpur I – 88.13%
Egra I – 82.83%
Egra II – 86.47%
Patashpur I – 86.58%
Patashpur II – 86.50%
2011 Census: CD Block Wise

Primary Census Abstract Data

=== Language and religion ===
Religion in Ramnagar I CD block (2011)
Hinduism	86.88%
Islam	12.93%
Other or not stated	0.19%

In 2011 census Hindus numbered 145,375 and formed 86.88% of the population in Ramnagar I CD Block. Muslims numbered 21,629 and formed 12.93% of the population. Others numbered 326 and formed 0.19% of the population. In 2001, Hindus made up 88.12% and Muslims 11.82% of the population respectively.

Languages of Ramnagar I CD block (2011)
1. Bengali (95.6%)
2. Odia (2.67%)
3. Others (1.69%)

According to the 2011 census, 95.64% of the population spoke Bengali and 2.67% Odia as their first language.

== Rural poverty ==
The District Human Development Report for Purba Medinipur has provided a CD Block-wise data table for Modified Human Poverty Index of the district. Ramnagar I CD Block registered 21.31 on the MHPI scale. The CD Block-wise mean MHPI was estimated at 24.78. Eleven out of twentyfive CD Blocks were found to be severely deprived in respect of grand CD Block average value of MHPI (CD Blocks with lower amount of poverty are better): All the CD Blocks of Haldia and Contai subdivisions appeared backward, except Ramnagar I & II, of all the blocks of Egra subdivision only Bhagabanpur I appeared backward and in Tamluk subdivision none appeared backward.

== Economy ==
=== Livelihood ===
In Ramnagar I CD Block in 2011, total workers formed 34.36% of the total population and amongst the class of total workers, cultivators formed 19.62%, agricultural labourers 34.26%, household industry workers 2.54% and other workers 43.58.%.

=== Infrastructure ===
There are 137 inhabited villages in Ramnagar I CD block. All 137 villages (100%) have power supply. All 137 villages (100%) have drinking water supply. 22 villages (16.06%) have post offices. 125 villages (91.24%) have telephones (including landlines, public call offices and mobile phones). 49 villages (35.77%) have a pucca (paved) approach road and 42 villages (30.66%) have transport communication (includes bus service, rail facility and navigable waterways). 30 villages (21.90%) have agricultural credit societies. 8 villages (5.84%) have banks.

In 2007–08, around 40% of rural households in the district had electricity.

In 2013–14, there were 39 fertiliser depots, 11 seed stores and 30 fair price shops in the CD Block.

=== Agriculture ===
Persons engaged in agriculture
in Ramnagar I CD Block
1. Bargadars (4.72%)
2. Patta holders (12.3%)
3. Small farmers (3.26%)
4. Marginal farmers (37.2%)
5. Agricultural labourers (42.5%)

According to the District Human Development Report of Purba Medinipur: The agricultural sector is the lifeline of a predominantly rural economy. It is largely dependent on the Low Capacity Deep Tubewells (around 50%) or High Capacity Deep Tubewells (around 27%) for irrigation, as the district does not have a good network of canals, compared to some of the neighbouring districts. In many cases the canals are drainage canals which get the backflow of river water at times of high tide or the rainy season. The average size of land holding in Purba Medinipur, in 2005–06, was 0.73 hectares against 1.01 hectares in West Bengal.

In 2013–14, the total area irrigated in Ramnagar I CD Block was 9,216 hectares, out of which 100 hectares were irrigated by canal water, 1,960 hectares by tank water, 80 hectares by deep tube well and 3,300 hectares by shallow tube well.

Although the Bargadari Act of 1950 recognised the rights of bargadars to a higher share of crops from the land that they tilled, it was not implemented fully. Large tracts, beyond the prescribed limit of land ceiling, remained with the rich landlords. From 1977 onwards major land reforms took place in West Bengal. Land in excess of land ceiling was acquired and distributed amongst the peasants. Following land reforms land ownership pattern has undergone transformation. In 2013–14, persons engaged in agriculture in Ramnagar I CD Block could be classified as follows: bargadars 4.72%, patta (document) holders 12.28%, small farmers (possessing land between 1 and 2 hectares) 3.26%, marginal farmers (possessing land up to 1 hectare) 37.21% and agricultural labourers 42.53%.

In 2013–14, Ramnagar I CD Block produced 1,528 tonnes of Aman paddy, the main winter crop, from 2,018 hectares and 20,531 tonnes of Boro paddy, the spring crop, from 5,944 hectares. It also produced pulses.

Betelvine is a major source of livelihood in Purba Medinipur district, particularly in Tamluk and Contai subdivisions. Betelvine production in 2008-09 was the highest amongst all the districts and was around a third of the total state production. In 2008–09, Purba Mednipur produced 2,789 tonnes of cashew nuts from 3,340 hectares of land.

Concentration of Handicraft Activities in CD Blocks
- Horn Craft - Kolaghat
- Pata Chitra - Chandipur, Nandakumar
- Sea Shell – Ramnagar I & II
- Mat & Mat Diversified Products – Ramnagar I, Egra I & II, Patashpur I
- Brass & Bell Metal – Ramnagar I, Mahisadal, Patashpur II, Egra I
- Diversified Jute Products – Ramnagar II, Nandakumar, Kolaghat, Shahid Matangini
- Cane & Bamboo Products - Chandipur, Nandakumar, Kolaghat, Shahid Matangini
- Sola Craft - Tamluk, Kolaghat
- Pottery/Terracotta - Panskura, Tamluk, Sahid Matangini, Nandakumar
- Wood Craft - Tamluk
- Zari work- Sutahta, Mahisadal, Haldia, Nandakumar

Source: District Human Development Report, Purba Medinipur, Page 97

=== Pisciculture ===
Purba Medinipur's net district domestic product derives one fifth of its earnings from fisheries, the highest amongst all the districts of West Bengal. The nett area available for effective pisciculture in Ramnagar I CD Block in 2013-14 was 548.03 hectares. 2,870 persons were engaged in the profession and approximate annual production was 20,880 quintals.

=== Banking ===
In 2013–14, Ramnagar I CD Block had offices of 9 commercial banks and 1 gramin bank.

=== Backward Regions Grant Fund ===
Medinipur East district is listed as a backward region and receives financial support from the Backward Regions Grant Fund. The fund, created by the Government of India, is designed to redress regional imbalances in development. As of 2012, 272 districts across the country were listed under this scheme. The list includes 11 districts of West Bengal.

== Transport ==
Ramnagar I CD Block has 1 ferry services, 48 originating/ terminating bus routes. The nearest railway station is 8 km from the CD Block headquarters.

Ramnagar and Tikra are stations on the Tamluk-Digha line, constructed in 2003-04.

SH 4 connecting Jhalda (in Purulia district) and Digha (in Purba Medinipur district) passes through this block.

== Education ==
In 2013–14, Ramnagar I CD Block had 127 primary schools with 6,660 students, 15 middle schools with 874 students, 4 high schools with 2,758 students and 14 higher secondary schools with 17,008 students. Ramnagar I CD Block had 282 institutions for special and non-formal education with 10,769 students.

As per the 2011 census, in Ramnagar I CD block, amongst the 137 inhabited villages, 33 villages did not have a school, 21 villages had two or more primary schools, 31 villages had at least 1 primary and 1 middle school and 17 villages had at least 1 middle and 1 secondary school.

== Healthcare ==
In 2014, Ramnagar I CD Block had 1 hospital, 1 block primary health centre, 3 primary health centres and 4 private nursing homes with total 90 beds and 14 doctors (excluding private bodies). It had 25 family welfare sub centres. 8,687 patients were treated indoor and 129,607 patients were treated outdoor in the hospitals, health centres and subcentres of the CD Block.

State General Hospital (with 50 beds) and Digha Aghore Kamini Block Primary Health Centre (with 15 beds) at Digha are the main medical facilities in Ramnagar I CD block. There are primary health centres at Chandanpur (with 10 beds), Gobra (with 6 beds), Sadihat (with 6 beds) and Pichhaboni, PO Chowlkhola (with 10 beds).
