= Khejuri I =

- Community development block
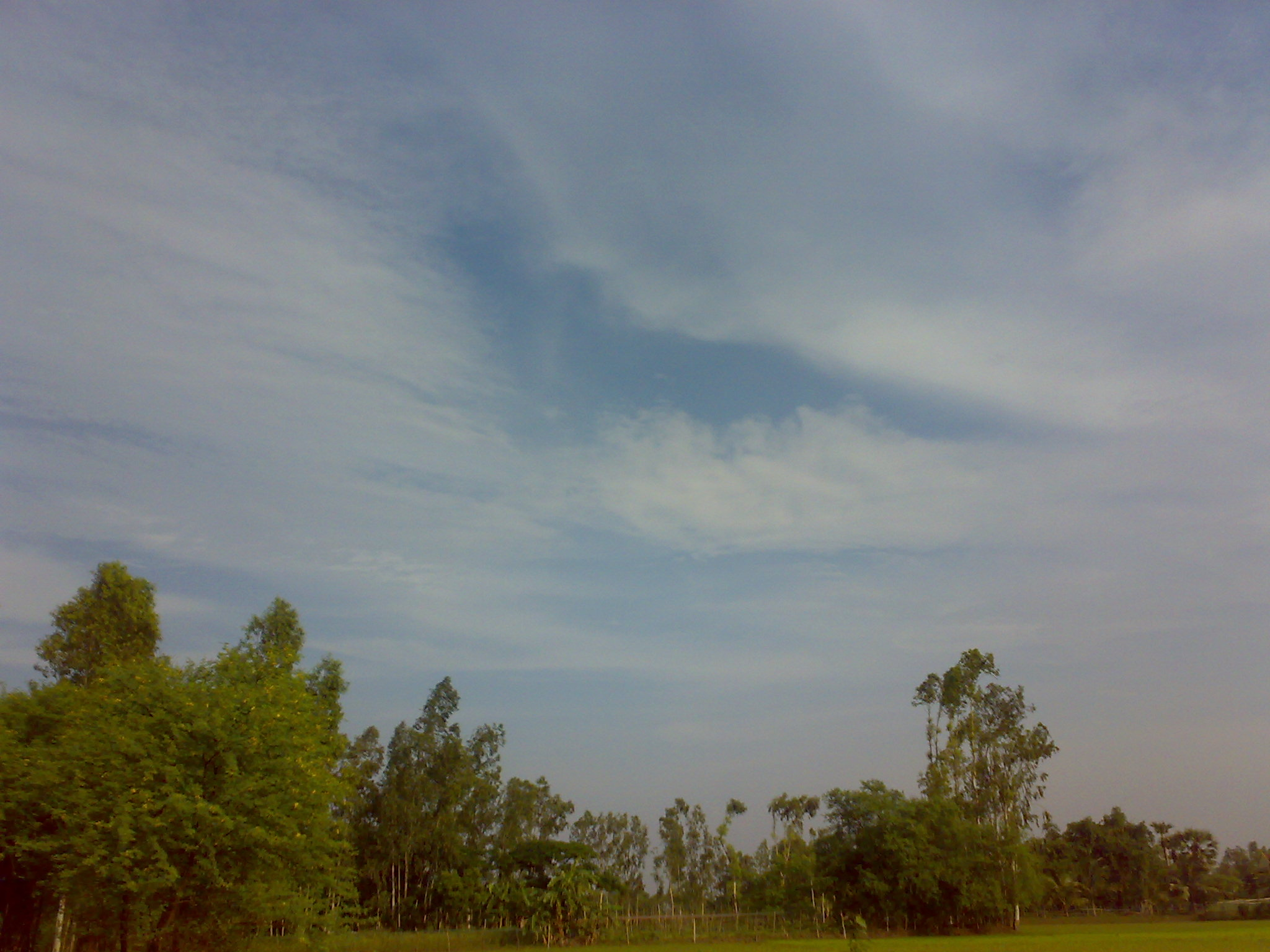
- Typical view of Khejuri rural area

- Location in West Bengal, India
- Coordinates: 21.8522581°N 87.7852249°E
- Country: India
- State: West Bengal
- District: Purba Medinipur

Government
  - Type: Community development block

Area
  - Total: 130.51 km^{2} (50.39 sq mi)
- Elevation: 5 m (16 ft)

Population (2011)
  - Total: 132,992
  - Density: 1,019.0/km^{2} (2,639.2/sq mi)

Languages
  - Official: Bengali, English
- Time zone: UTC+5:30 (IST)
- PIN: 721430 (Haria); 721432 (Kalagachia)
- Area code: 03224
- ISO 3166 code: IN-WB
- Vehicle registration: WB-29, WB-30, WB-31, WB-32, WB-33
- Literacy: 88.90%
- Lok Sabha constituency: Kanthi
- Vidhan Sabha constituency: Khejuri
- Website: purbamedinipur.gov.in

Khejuri I is a community development block that forms an administrative division in Contai subdivision of Purba Medinipur district in the Indian state of West Bengal.

== Geography ==
Purba Medinipur district is part of the lower Indo-Gangetic Plain and Eastern coastal plains. Topographically, the district can be divided into two parts – (a) almost entirely flat plains on the west, east and north, (b) the coastal plains on the south. The vast expanse of land is formed of alluvium and is composed of younger and coastal alluvial. The elevation of the district is within 10 metres above mean sea level. The district has a long coastline of 65.5 km along its southern and south eastern boundary. Five coastal CD Blocks, namely, Khejuri II, Contai II (Deshapran), Contai I, Ramnagar I and II, are occasionally affected by cyclones and tornadoes. Tidal floods are quite regular in these five CD Blocks. Normally floods occur in 21 of the 25 CD Blocks in the district. The major rivers are Haldi, Rupnarayan, Rasulpur, Bagui and Keleghai, flowing in north to south or south-east direction. River water is an important source of irrigation. The district has a low 899 hectare forest cover, which is 0.02% of its geographical area.

Kamarda, a constituent panchayat of Khejuri I block, is located at 21°51′08″N 87°47′07″E.

Khejuri I CD Block is bounded by Bhagabanpur II and Nandigram II CD Blocks in the north, Nandigram I and Khejuri II CD Blocks in the east, Contai II and Contai III CD Blocks in the south and Bhagabanpur II CD Block in the west.

It is located 45 km from Tamluk, the district headquarters.

Khejuri I CD Block has an area of 130.51 km^{2}. It has 1 panchayat samity, 6 gram panchayats, 93 gram sansads (village councils), 42 mouzas and 42 inhabited villages. Khejuri police station serves this block. Headquarters of this CD Block is at Kamarda.

Gram panchayats of Khejuri I block/ panchayat samiti are: Birbandar, Heria, Kalagechia, Kamarda, Lakshi and Tikashi.

== Demographics ==
=== Population ===
As per 2011 Census of India Khejuri I CD Block had a total population of 132,992, all of which were rural. There were 68,494 (52%) males and 64,498 (48%) females. Population below 6 years was 15,925. Scheduled Castes numbered 17,744 (13.34%) and Scheduled Tribes numbered 169 (0.13%).

As per 2001 census, Khejuri I block had a total population of 114,645, out of which 58,891 were males and 55,754 were females. Khejuri I block registered a population growth of 14.94 per cent during the 1991-2001 decade. Decadal growth for the combined Midnapore district was 14.87 per cent. Decadal growth in West Bengal was 17.84 per cent.

Large villages (with 4,000+ population) in Khejuri I CD Block (2011 census figures in brackets): Patna (5,772), Kulta (4,576), Chingur Dania (6,016), Jahanabad (7,174), Kamarda (11,658), Krishna Nagar (6,328), Mohati (4,761), Herya Atmarampur (4,102), Lakhi (13,109) and Tikashi (10,505).

Other villages in Khejuri I CD Block (2011 census figures in brackets): Kala Gachhia (2,277).

=== Literacy ===
As per 2011 census the total number of literates in Khejuri I CD Block was 104,075 (88.90% of the population over 6 years) out of which 56,122 (54%) were males and 47,953 (46%) were females.

As per the 2011 census, literacy in Purba Medinipur district was 87.02%. Purba Medinipur had the highest literacy amongst all the districts of West Bengal in 2011.

See also – List of West Bengal districts ranked by literacy rate

Literacy in CD blocks of
Purba Medinipur district
Tamluk subdivision
Tamluk – 87.06%
Sahid Matangini – 86.99%
Panskura I – 83.65%
Panskura II – 84.93%
Nandakumar – 85.56%
Chandipur – 87.81%
Moyna – 86.33%
Haldia subdivision
Mahishadal – 86.21%
Nandigram I – 84.89%
Nandigram II – 89.16%
Sutahata – 85.42%
Haldia – 85.96%
Contai subdivision
Contai I – 89.32%
Contai II – 88.33%
Contai III – 89.88%
Khejuri I – 88.90%
Khejuri II – 85.37%
Ramnagar I – 87.84%
Ramnagar II – 89.38%
Bhagabanpur II – 90.98%
Egra subdivision
Bhagabanpur I – 88.13%
Egra I – 82.83%
Egra II – 86.47%
Patashpur I – 86.58%
Patashpur II – 86.50%
2011 Census: CD Block Wise

Primary Census Abstract Data

=== Language and religion ===
Religion in Khejuri I CD block (2011)
Hinduism	91.11%
Islam	8.73%
Other or not stated	0.16%

In 2011 census Hindus numbered 121,175 and formed 91.11% of the population in Khejuri I CD Block. Muslims numbered 11,614 and formed 8.73% of the population. Others numbered 203 and formed 0.16% of the population. In 2001, Hindus made up 92.29% and Muslims 7.68% of the population respectively.

Bengali is the predominant language, spoken by 99.92% of the population.

== Rural poverty ==
The District Human Development Report for Purba Medinipur has provided a CD Block-wise data table for Modified Human Poverty Index of the district. Khejuri I CD Block registered 25.55 on the MHPI scale. The CD Block-wise mean MHPI was estimated at 24.78. Eleven out of twentyfive CD Blocks were found to be severely deprived in respect of grand CD Block average value of MHPI (CD Blocks with lower amount of poverty are better): All the CD Blocks of Haldia and Contai subdivisions appeared backward, except Ramnagar I & II, of all the blocks of Egra subdivision only Bhagabanpur I appeared backward and in Tamluk subdivision none appeared backward.

== Economy ==
=== Livelihood ===
In Khejuri I CD Block in 2011, total workers formed 38.30% of the total population and amongst the class of total workers, cultivators formed 12.59%, agricultural labourers 46.69%, household industry workers 4.31% and other workers 36.41.%.

=== Infrastructure ===
There are 42 inhabited villages in Khejuri I CD block. All 42 villages (100%) have power supply. All 42 villages (100%) have drinking water supply. 16 villages (38.1%) have post offices. 41 villages (97.62%) have telephones (including landlines, public call offices and mobile phones). 10 villages (23.81%) have a pucca (paved) approach road and 15 villages (35.71%) have transport communication (includes bus service, rail facility and navigable waterways). 20 villages (47.62%) have agricultural credit societies. 8 villages (19.05%) have banks.

In 2007-08, around 40% of rural households in the district had electricity.

In 2013-14, there were 73 fertiliser depots, 10 seed stores and 21 fair price shops in the CD Block.

=== Agriculture ===
Persons engaged in agriculture
in Khejuri I CD Block
1. Bargadars (18.5%)
2. Patta holders (25.0%)
3. Small farmers (1.61%)
4. Marginal farmers (24.7%)
5. Agricultural labourers (30.2%)

According to the District Human Development Report of Purba Medinipur: The agricultural sector is the lifeline of a predominantly rural economy. It is largely dependent on the Low Capacity Deep Tubewells (around 50%) or High Capacity Deep Tubewells (around 27%) for irrigation, as the district does not have a good network of canals, compared to some of the neighbouring districts. In many cases the canals are drainage canals which get the backflow of river water at times of high tide or the rainy season. The average size of land holding in Purba Medinipur, in 2005-06, was 0.73 hectares against 1.01 hectares in West Bengal.

In 2013-14, the total area irrigated in Khejuri I CD Block was 3,962 hectares, out of which 175 hectares were irrigated by canal water, 2,940 hectares by tank water (there were 14,885 tanks in Khejuri I CD Block), 745 hectares by deep tube well, 52 hectares by shallow tube well and 50 hectares by other means.

Although the Bargadari Act of 1950 recognised the rights of bargadars to a higher share of crops from the land that they tilled, it was not implemented fully. Large tracts, beyond the prescribed limit of land ceiling, remained with the rich landlords. From 1977 onwards major land reforms took place in West Bengal. Land in excess of land ceiling was acquired and distributed amongst the peasants. Following land reforms land ownership pattern has undergone transformation. In 2013-14, persons engaged in agriculture in Khejuri I CD Block could be classified as follows: bargadars 18.52%, patta (document) holders 24.99%, small farmers (possessing land between 1 and 2 hectares) 1.61%, marginal farmers (possessing land up to 1 hectare) 24.69% and agricultural labourers 30.19%.

In 2013-14, Khejuri I CD Block produced 14,253 tonnes of Aman paddy, the main winter crop, from 8,756 hectares, 3,061 tonnes of Boro paddy, the spring crop, from 1,088 hectares, 325 tonne of jute from 24 hectares and 5,599tonnes of potatoes from 238 hectares. It also produced pilses and oilseeds.

Betelvine is a major source of livelihood in Purba Medinipur district, particularly in Tamluk and Contai subdivisions. Betelvine production in 2008-09 was the highest amongst all the districts and was around a third of the total state production. In 2008-09, Purba Mednipur produced 2,789 tonnes of cashew nuts from 3,340 hectares of land.

Concentration of Handicraft Activities in CD Blocks
- Horn Craft - Kolaghat
- Pata Chitra - Chandipur, Nandakumar
- Sea Shell – Ramnagar I & II
- Mat & Mat Diversified Products – Ramnagar I, Egra I & II, Patashpur I
- Brass & Bell Metal – Ramnagar I, Mahisadal, Patashpur II, Egra I
- Diversified Jute Products – Ramnagar II, Nandakumar, Kolaghat, Shahid Matangini
- Cane & Bamboo Products - Chandipur, Nandakumar, Kolaghat, Shahid Matangini
- Sola Craft - Tamluk, Kolaghat
- Pottery/Terracotta - Panskura, Tamluk, Sahid Matangini, Nandakumar
- Wood Craft - Tamluk
- Zari work- Sutahta, Mahisadal, Haldia, Nandakumar

Source: District Human Development Report, Purba Medinipur, Page 97

=== Pisciculture ===
Purba Medinipur's net district domestic product derives one fifth of its earnings from fisheries, the highest amongst all the districts of West Bengal. The nett area available for effective pisciculture in Khejuri I CD Block in 2013-14 was 720.15 hectares. 3,615 persons were engaged in the profession and approximate annual production was 27,438 quintals.

=== Banking ===
In 2013-14, Khejuri I CD Block had offices of 4 commercial banks and 2 gramin banks.

=== Backward Regions Grant Fund ===
Medinipur East district is listed as a backward region and receives financial support from the Backward Regions Grant Fund. The fund, created by the Government of India, is designed to redress regional imbalances in development. As of 2012, 272 districts across the country were listed under this scheme. The list includes 11 districts of West Bengal.

== Transport ==
Khejuri I CD Block has 4 ferry services, 8 originating/ terminating bus routes. The nearest railway station is 15 km from the CD Block headquarters.

Henria is a station on the Tamluk-Digha line, constructed in 2003-04.

SH 4 connecting Jhalda (in Purulia district) and Digha (in Purba Medinipur district) passes through the western end of this block.

== Education ==
In 2013-14, Khejuri I CD Block had 107 primary schools with 5,182 students, 3 middle schools with 1,464 students, 16 high schools with 9,368 students and 8 higher secondary schools with 6,932 students. Khejuri I CD Block had 1 general college with 1,594 students, 2 technical/ professional institutes with 200 students, 249 institutions for special and non-formal education with 10,053 students.

As per the 2011 census, in Khejuri I CD block, amongst the 42 inhabited villages, all villages had schools, 33 villages had two or more primary schools, 24 villages had at least 1 primary and 1 middle school and 19 villages had at least 1 middle and 1 secondary school.

== Healthcare ==
In 2014, Khejuri I CD Block had 1 block primary health centre and 1 primary health centre with total 40 beds and 6 doctors (excluding private bodies). It had 20 family welfare sub centres. 3,093 patients were treated indoor and 76,421 patients were treated outdoor in the hospitals, health centres and subcentres of the CD Block.

Kamarda Block Primary Health Centre at Kamarda Bazar (with 30 beds) is the main medical facility in Khejuri I CD block. It is the Office of Block Medical officer of Health( BMOH) for Khejuri-1 block.There is a primary health centre at Heria (with 10 beds).
