= Ramnagar II =

- Community Development Block

- Location in West Bengal, India
- Coordinates: 21.7338°N 87.5501°E
- Country: India
- State: West Bengal
- District: Purba Medinipur

Government
  - Type: Community development block

Area
  - Total: 163.27 km^{2} (63.04 sq mi)
- Elevation: 4 m (13 ft)

Population (2011)
  - Total: 156,054
  - Density: 955.80/km^{2} (2,475.5/sq mi)

Languages
  - Official: Bengali, English
- Time zone: UTC+5:30 (IST)
- PIN: 721423 (Balisai); 721453 (Depal); 721461 (Kalindi)
- Area code: 03229
- ISO 3166 code: IN-WB
- Vehicle registration: WB-29, WB-30, WB-31, WB-32, WB-33
- Literacy: 89.38%
- Lok Sabha constituency: Kanthi
- Vidhan Sabha constituency: Ramnagar
- Website: Ramnagar, West Bengal, India

Ramnagar II is a community development block that forms an administrative division in Contai subdivision of Purba Medinipur district in the Indian state of West Bengal.

== Geography ==
Purba Medinipur district is part of the lower Indo-Gangetic Plain and Eastern coastal plains. Topographically, the district can be divided into two parts – (a) almost entirely flat plains on the west, east and north, (b) the coastal plains on the south. The vast expanse of land is formed of alluvium and is composed of younger and coastal alluvial. The elevation of the district is within 10 metres above mean sea level. The district has a long coastline of 65.5 km along its southern and south eastern boundary. Five coastal CD Blocks, namely, Khejuri II, Contai II (Deshapran), Contai I, Ramnagar I and II, are occasionally affected by cyclones and tornadoes. Tidal floods are quite regular in these five CD Blocks. Normally floods occur in 21 of the 25 CD Blocks in the district. The major rivers are Haldi, Rupnarayan, Rasulpur, Bagui and Keleghai, flowing in north to south or south-east direction. River water is an important source of irrigation. The district has a low 899 hectare forest cover, which is 0.02% of its geographical area.

Depal, a constituent panchayat of Ramnagar II block, is located at 21°44′02″N 87°33′00″E.

Ramnagar II CD Block is bounded by Egra II and Contai I CD Blocks in the north, Contai I CD Block in the east, Bay of Bengal in the south and Ramnagar I CD Block in the west.

It is located 89 km from Tamluk, the district headquarters.

Ramnagar II CD Block has an area of 163.27 km^{2}. It has 1 panchayat samity, 8 gram panchayats, 119 gram sansads (village councils), 137 mouzas and 134 inhabited villages. Ramnagar (part) police station serves this block. Headquarters of this CD Block is at Bara Bankuya.

Gram panchayats of Ramnagar II block/ panchayat samiti are: Badalpur, Balisai, Depal, Kadua, Kalindi, Maithana, Paldhui and Satilapur.

== Demographics ==
=== Population ===
As per 2011 Census of India Ramnagar II CD Block had a total population of 156,054, all of which were rural. There were 80,370 (52%) males and 75,681 (48%) females. Population below 6 years was 16,314. Scheduled Castes numbered 21,787 (13.96%) and Scheduled Tribes numbered 299 (0.19%).

As per 2001 census, Ramnagar II block had a total population of 137,358, out of which 70,072 were males and 67,286 were females. Ramnagar II block registered a population growth of 11.29 per cent during the 1991-2001 decade. Decadal growth for the combined Midnapore district was 14.87 per cent. Decadal growth in West Bengal was 17.84 per cent.

Large villages (with 4,000+ population) in Ramnagar II CD Block (2011 census figures in brackets): Kanpur (4,523), Satilapur (4,570), Karonji (4,329), Bara Bankuya (6,169) and Kalindi (4,893).

Other villages in Ramnagar II CD Block (2011 census figures in brackets): Paldhui (3,813), Kadua (2,615), Depal (3,359), Badalpur (1,096).

=== Literacy ===
As per 2011 census the total number of literates in Ramnagar II CD Block was 124,901 (89.38% of the population over 6 years) out of which 65,543 (55%) were males and 56,358 (45%) were females.

As per 2011 census, literacy in Purba Medinipur district was 87.02%. Purba Medinipur had the highest literacy amongst all the districts of West Bengal in 2011.

See also – List of West Bengal districts ranked by literacy rate

Literacy in CD blocks of
Purba Medinipur district
Tamluk subdivision
Tamluk – 87.06%
Sahid Matangini – 86.99%
Panskura I – 83.65%
Panskura II – 84.93%
Nandakumar – 85.56%
Chandipur – 87.81%
Moyna – 86.33%
Haldia subdivision
Mahishadal – 86.21%
Nandigram I – 84.89%
Nandigram II – 89.16%
Sutahata – 85.42%
Haldia – 85.96%
Contai subdivision
Contai I – 89.32%
Contai II – 88.33%
Contai III – 89.88%
Khejuri I – 88.90%
Khejuri II – 85.37%
Ramnagar I – 87.84%
Ramnagar II – 89.38%
Bhagabanpur II – 90.98%
Egra subdivision
Bhagabanpur I – 88.13%
Egra I – 82.83%
Egra II – 86.47%
Patashpur I – 86.58%
Patashpur II – 86.50%
2011 Census: CD Block Wise

Primary Census Abstract Data

=== Language and religion ===
Religion in Ramnagar II CD block (2011)
Hinduism	91.86%
Islam	8.04%
Other or not stated	0.10%

In 2011 census Hindus numbered 143,362 and formed 91.86% of the population in Ramnagar II CD Block. Muslims numbered 12,542 and formed 8.04% of the population. Others numbered 150 and formed 0.10% of the population. In 2001, Hindus made up 92.42% and Muslims 7.53% of the population respectively.

Bengali is the predominant language, spoken by 99.05% of the population.

== Rural poverty ==
The District Human Development Report for Purba Medinipur has provided a CD Block-wise data table for Modified Human Poverty Index of the district. Ramnagar II CD Block registered 22.80 on the MHPI scale. The CD Block-wise mean MHPI was estimated at 24.78. Eleven out of twentyfive CD Blocks were found to be severely deprived in respect of grand CD Block average value of MHPI (CD Blocks with lower amount of poverty are better): All the CD Blocks of Haldia and Contai subdivisions appeared backward, except Ramnagar I & II, of all the blocks of Egra subdivision only Bhagabanpur I appeared backward and in Tamluk subdivision none appeared backward.

== Economy ==
=== Livelihood ===
In Ramnagar II CD Block in 2011, total workers formed 36.37% of the total population and amongst the class of total workers, cultivators formed 20.04%, agricultural labourers 45.44%, household industry workers 2.05% and other workers 32.47.%.

=== Infrastructure ===
There are 134 inhabited villages in Ramnagar II CD block. All 134 villages (100%) have power supply. All 127 villages (94.78%) have drinking water supply. 27 villages (20.15%) have post offices. 106 villages (79.1%) have telephones (including landlines, public call offices and mobile phones). 33 villages (24.63%) have a pucca (paved) approach road and 18 villages (13.43%) have transport communication (includes bus service, rail facility and navigable waterways). 25 villages (18.66%) have agricultural credit societies. 9 villages (6.72%) have banks.

In 2007-08, around 40% of rural households in the district had electricity.

In 2013-14, there were 90 fertiliser depots, 5 seed stores and 32 fair price shops in the CD Block.

=== Agriculture ===
Persons engaged in agriculture
in Ramnagar II CD Block
1. Bargadars (5.78%)
2. Patta holders (11.4%)
3. Small farmers (2.87%)
4. Marginal farmers (35.1%)
5. Agricultural labourers (44.8%)

According to the District Human Development Report of Purba Medinipur: The agricultural sector is the lifeline of a predominantly rural economy. It is largely dependent on the Low Capacity Deep Tubewells (around 50%) or High Capacity Deep Tubewells (around 27%) for irrigation, as the district does not have a good network of canals, compared to some of the neighbouring districts. In many cases the canals are drainage canals which get the backflow of river water at times of high tide or the rainy season. The average size of land holding in Purba Medinipur, in 2005-06, was 0.73 hectares against 1.01 hectares in West Bengal.

In 2013-14, the total area irrigated in Ramnagar II CD Block was 4,635 hectares, out of which 150 hectares were irrigated by tank water, 40 hectares by deep tube well and 4,445 hectares by shallow tube well.

Although the Bargadari Act of 1950 recognised the rights of bargadars to a higher share of crops from the land that they tilled, it was not implemented fully. Large tracts, beyond the prescribed limit of land ceiling, remained with the rich landlords. From 1977 onwards major land reforms took place in West Bengal. Land in excess of land ceiling was acquired and distributed amongst the peasants. Following land reforms land ownership pattern has undergone transformation. In 2013-14, persons engaged in agriculture in Ramnagar II CD Block could be classified as follows: bargadars 5.78%, patta (document) holders 11.43%, small farmers (possessing land between 1 and 2 hectares) 2.87%, marginal farmers (possessing land up to 1 hectare) 35.15% and agricultural labourers 44.76%.

In 2013-14, Ramnagar II CD Block produced 11,648 tonnes of Aman paddy, the main winter crop, from 9,622 hectares and 29,171 tonnes of Boro paddy, the spring crop, from 7,919 hectares.

Betelvine is a major source of livelihood in Purba Medinipur district, particularly in Tamluk and Contai subdivisions. Betelvine production in 2008-09 was the highest amongst all the districts and was around a third of the total state production. In 2008-09, Purba Mednipur produced 2,789 tonnes of cashew nuts from 3,340 hectares of land.

Concentration of Handicraft Activities in CD Blocks
- Horn Craft - Kolaghat
- Pata Chitra - Chandipur, Nandakumar
- Sea Shell – Ramnagar I & II
- Mat & Mat Diversified Products – Ramnagar I, Egra I & II, Patashpur I
- Brass & Bell Metal – Ramnagar I, Mahisadal, Patashpur II, Egra I
- Diversified Jute Products – Ramnagar II, Nandakumar, Kolaghat, Shahid Matangini
- Cane & Bamboo Products - Chandipur, Nandakumar, Kolaghat, Shahid Matangini
- Sola Craft - Tamluk, Kolaghat
- Pottery/Terracotta - Panskura, Tamluk, Sahid Matangini, Nandakumar
- Wood Craft - Tamluk
- Zari work- Sutahta, Mahisadal, Haldia, Nandakumar

Source: District Human Development Report, Purba Medinipur, Page 97

=== Pisciculture ===
Purba Medinipur's net district domestic product derives one fifth of its earnings from fisheries, the highest amongst all the districts of West Bengal. The nett area available for effective pisciculture in Ramnagar II CD Block in 2013-14 was 735.56 hectares. 3,300 persons were engaged in the profession and approximate annual production was 28,025 quintals.

=== Banking ===
In 2013-14, Ramnagar II CD Block had offices of 5 commercial banks and 2 gramin banks.

=== Backward Regions Grant Fund ===
Medinipur East district is listed as a backward region and receives financial support from the Backward Regions Grant Fund. The fund, created by the Government of India, is designed to redress regional imbalances in development. As of 2012, 272 districts across the country were listed under this scheme. The list includes 11 districts of West Bengal.

== Transport ==
Ramnagar II CD Block has 7 originating/ terminating bus routes. The nearest railway station is 8 km from the CD Block headquarters.

Ashapurna Devi and Badalpur are stations on the Tamluk-Digha line, constructed in 2003-04.

SH 4 connecting Jhalda (in Purulia district) and Digha (in Purba Medinipur district) passes through this block.

== Education ==
In 2013-14, Ramnagar II CD Block had 100 primary schools with 5,266 students, 17 middle schools with 1,309 students, 11 high schools with 5,151 students and 10 higher secondary schools with 12,272 students. Ramnagar II CD Block had 1 general college with 2,544 students and 258 institutions for special and non-formal education with 8,461 students.

As per the 2011 census, in Ramnagar II CD block, amongst the 134 inhabited villages, 20 villages did not have a school, 36 villages had two or more primary schools, 39 villages had at least 1 primary and 1 middle school and 20 villages had at least 1 middle and 1 secondary school.

Ramnagar College at Depal was established in 1972. In addition to courses in arts, science and commerce, it offers courses in hospitality and tourism, and fishery and farm management.

Ramnagar B.Ed College at Depal offers B.Ed. course.

== Healthcare ==
In 2014, Ramnagar II CD Block had 1 block primary health centre and 3 primary health centres with total 30 beds and 11 doctors (excluding private bodies). It had 25 family welfare sub centres. 2,692 patients were treated indoor and 117,826 patients were treated outdoor in the hospitals, health centres and subcentres of the CD Block.

Bararankura Rural Hospital, at Bararankura, PO Balisai (with 30 beds) is the main medical facility in Ramnagar II CD block. There are primary health centres at Nijmaithula, PO Batatala (with 10 seats) and Hamirpur, PO Depal (with 2 seats).
