= Petuaghat Fishing Harbour =

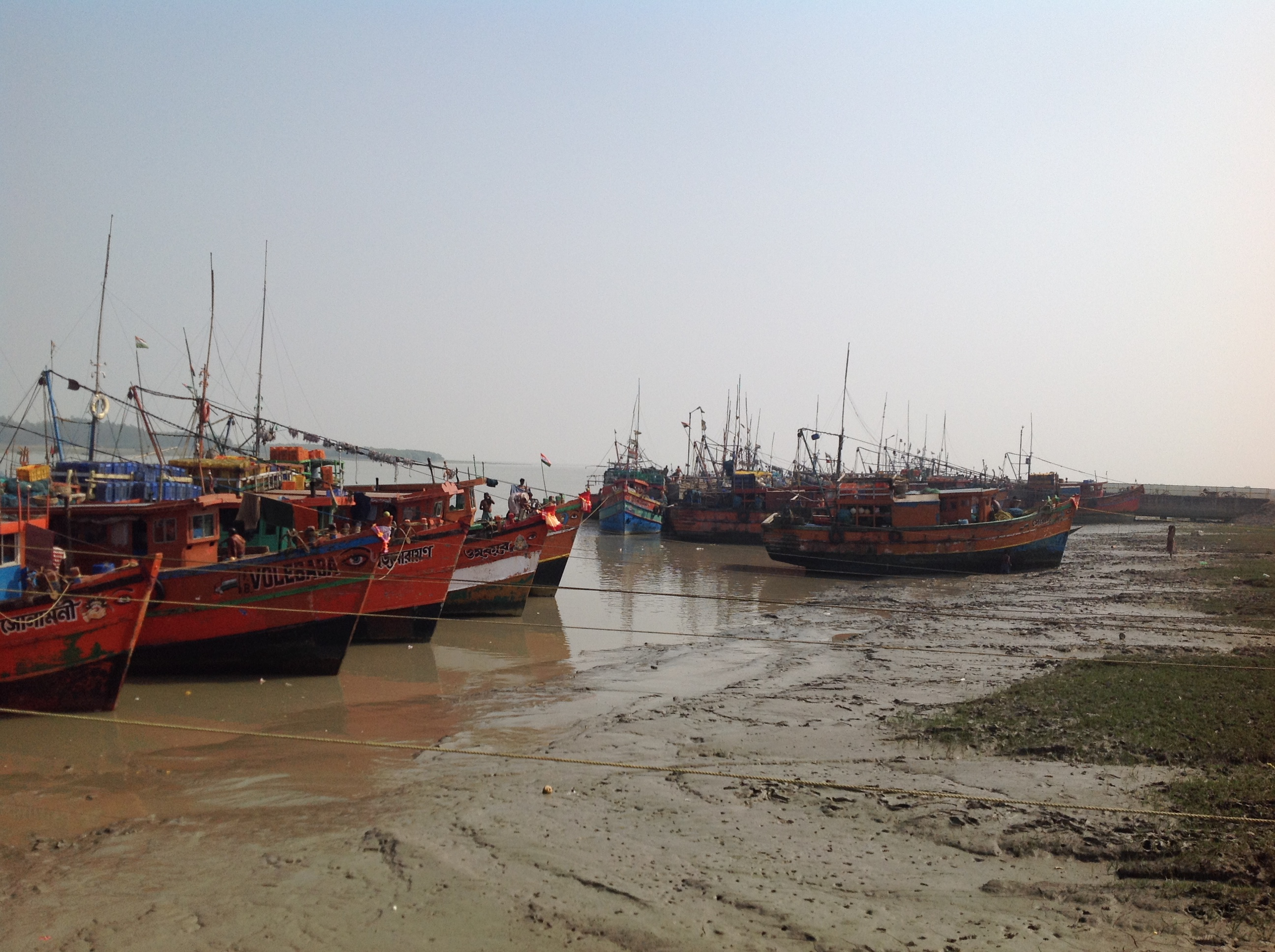
- Fishing Boat at Petuaghat Fishing Harbour
- Click on the map for a fullscreen view

Location
- Country: India
- Location: Petuaghat, West Bengal, India
- Coordinates: 21.79472°N 87.88333°E

Details
- Opened: 2010
- Operated by: West Bengal Fisheries Department
- Owned by: Government of West Bengal
- Type of harbour: Fishing Port
- Land area: 0.118 sq.km.
- No. of berths: 3

Petuaghat Fishing Harbour is a fishing harbour established near the mouth of the Rasulpur River at Petuaaghat in East Midnapore district of West Bengal. The port was inaugurated in 2010 by the then Governor of West Bengal, M. K. Narayanan. The port has been developed in 11.8 hectares of land. The port is India's seventh largest fishing port. The port has 400 deep sea fishing trawlers and 200 traditional trawlers. There is also one ice mill, an ice house, a fake fabric center, and a trailer oil sales center at the port. A trailer repair center has also been proposed to be built.

== Construction ==
Cities and towns in Contai subdivision of Purba Medinipur district
M: municipal city/ town, CT: census town, R: rural/ urban centre, H: historical/ religious centre, S: port, sea-beach
Owing to space constraints in the small map, the actual locations in a larger map may vary slightly

Construction of the harbour began during the Left Front regime in 2005. The project was announced on 1 March 2005 by the then fisheries minister Kiranmoy Nanda with a budget of 32 cores, half of which was to be given by the centre and rest by the state. This was the sixth fishing port in the state established, the others being two in Shankarpur, and one each in Kakdwip, Frazergunj and Diamond Harbour. The construction was completed in 2010. The cost of construction of the port is estimated to be 200 crore. In the first phase, the port costing 60 crore was spent. The second step has started. This step will build a dry dock at the port.

== See also ==
- Kakdwip Fishing Port
