= Basantia =

- Census town
- Location in West Bengal, India Basantia (India)
- Coordinates: 21.801267°N 87.801846°E
- Country: India
- State: West Bengal
- District: Purba Medinipur

Area
  - Total: 1.3479 km^{2} (0.5204 sq mi)

Population (2011)
  - Total: 5,455
  - Density: 4,047/km^{2} (10,480/sq mi)

Languages
  - Official: Bengali, English
- Time zone: UTC+5:30 (IST)
- PIN: 721442 (Basantia)
- Telephone/STD code: 03220
- Lok Sabha constituency: Kanthi
- Vidhan Sabha constituency: Kanthi Uttar
- Website: purbamedinipur.gov.in

Basantia is a census town and gram panchayat in Deshapran CD block in Contai subdivision of Purba Medinipur district in the state of West Bengal, India.

== Geography ==
Cities and towns in Contai subdivision of Purba Medinipur district
M: municipal city/ town, CT: census town, R: rural/ urban centre, H: historical/ religious centre, S: port, sea-beach
Owing to space constraints in the small map, the actual locations in a larger map may vary slightly

=== Location ===
Basantia is located at 21.801267°N 87.801846°E.

=== Urbanisation ===
93.55% of the population of Contai subdivision live in the rural areas. Only 6.45% of the population live in the urban areas and it is considerably behind Haldia subdivision in urbanization, where 20.81% of the population live in urban areas.

Note: The map alongside presents some of the notable locations in the subdivision. All places marked in the map are linked in the larger full screen map.

== Demographics ==
As per 2011 Census of India Basantia had a total population of 5,455 of which 2,843 (52%) were males and 2,612 (48%) were females. Population below 6 years was 700. The total number of literates in Basantia was 3,749 (78.84% of the population over 6 years).

== Religious Significance ==
The village has the famous temple of Sri Sri Gokul Chandra Rai Thakur. This temple was established by one Baikuntha Deb Goswami more than 250 years ago. He received a Zamindari grant of 7200 bighas of land to help with the services of the temple.

Since 1933, on the basis of an order of the Honourable High Court of Calcutta, the descendants of Rai Radha Shyam Das Adhikary Bahadur are continuing as Shebait and Mahanta of the temple.

They organise the famous RAS Utsav at the temple during the month of Kartik.

== Infrastructure ==
As per the District Census Handbook 2011, Basantia covered an area of 1.3479 km^{2}. It had the facility of a railway station at Contai 12 km away and bus routes in the town. Amongst the civic amenities it had 100 road lighting points and 1,120 domestic electric connections. Amongst the medical facilities it had a hospital and 8 medicine shops in the town. Amongst the educational facilities it had were 2 primary schools, 2 secondary schools and a senior secondary school. The nearest degree college was at Contai.

== Transport ==
Basantia is on Contai-Basantia-Benichak-Rasulpur Road.

== Education ==
Basantia High School is a coeducational higher secondary school.

Daruya Gandhi Smriti High School is a Bengali-medium coeducational school established in 1972.

== Healthcare ==
Basantia Rural Hospital at Basantia (with 30 beds) is the main medical facility in Deshapran CD block. There are primary health centres at Barabantalia (with 15 beds) and Daulatpur, PO Dariapur (with 10 beds).
