= Nandakumar (community development block) =

- Community development block
- Coordinates: 22.1963059°N 87.9207516°E
- Country: India
- State: West Bengal
- District: Purba Medinipur

Government
  - Type: Community development block

Area
  - Total: 165.70 km^{2} (63.98 sq mi)
- Elevation: 4 m (13 ft)

Population (2011)
  - Total: 262,998
  - Density: 1,587.2/km^{2} (4,110.8/sq mi)

Languages
  - Official: Bengali, English
- Time zone: UTC+5:30 (IST)
- PIN: 721632 (Nandakumar)
- Area code: 03228
- ISO 3166 code: IN-WB
- Vehicle registration: WB-29, WB-30, WB-31, WB-32, WB-33
- Literacy: 85.56%
- Lok Sabha constituency: Tamluk
- Vidhan Sabha constituency: Nandakumar
- Website: purbamedinipur.gov.in

Nandakumar is a community development block that forms an administrative division in Tamluk subdivision of Purba Medinipur district in the Indian state of West Bengal.

== Geography ==
Purba Medinipur district is part of the lower Indo-Gangetic Plain and Eastern coastal plains. Topographically, the district can be divided into two parts – (a) almost entirely flat plains on the west, east and north, (b) the coastal plains on the south. The vast expanse of land is formed of alluvium and is composed of younger and coastal alluvial. The elevation of the district is within 10 metres above mean sea level. The district has a long coastline of 65.5 km along its southern and south eastern boundary. Five coastal CD Blocks, namely, Khejuri II, Contai II (Deshapran), Contai I, Ramnagar I and II, are occasionally affected by cyclones and tornadoes. Tidal floods are quite regular in these five CD Blocks. Normally floods occur in 21 of the 25 CD Blocks in the district. The major rivers are Haldi, Rupnarayan, Rasulpur, Bagui and Keleghai, flowing in north to south or south-east direction. River water is an important source of irrigation. The district has a low 899 hectare forest cover, which is 0.02% of its geographical area.

Nandakumar is located at 22°11′47″N 87°55′15″E.

Nandakumar CD Block is bounded by Tamluk CD Block in the north, Mahishadal CD Blocks in the east, Chandipur CD Block in the south and Moyna CD Blocks in the west.

It is located 12 km from Tamluk, the district headquarters.

Nandakumar CD Block has an area of 165.70 km^{2}. It has 1 panchayat samity, 12 gram panchayats, 186 gram sansads (village councils), 100 mouzas and 100 inhabited villages. Nandakumar police station serves this block. Headquarters of this CD Block is at Kumarpur.

Gram panchayats of Nandakumar block/ panchayat samiti are: Bargodadgdar, Basudebpur, Byabattarhat Paschim, Byabattarhat Purba, Chaksimulia, Dakshin Narikeldanga, Kalyanpur, Kumarara, Kumarchak, Saorberia-Jalpai I, Saorberia-Jalpai II and Sitalpur Paschim.

== Demographics ==
=== Population ===
As per 2011 Census of India Nanda Kumar CD Block had a total population of 262,998, all of which were rural. There were 135,720 (52%) males and 127,278 (48%) females. Population below 6 years was 31,408. Scheduled Castes numbered 37,366 (14.21%) and Scheduled Tribes numbered 633 (0.24%).

As per 2001 census, Nandakumar block had a total population of 229,444, out of which 117,859 were males and 111,585 were females. Nandakumar block registered a population growth of 15.58 per cent during the 1991–2001 decade. Decadal growth for the combined Midnapore district was 14.87 per cent. Decadal growth in West Bengal was 17.84 per cent.

Large villages (with 4,000+ population) in Nandakumar CD Block (2011 census figures in brackets): Bargoda (4,971), Bar Godagudar (11,660), Kunar Chak (9,198), Saorabere Jalpai (14,774), Chak Simulya (4,620), Baich Berya (5,549), Khanchi (7,454), Raj Nagar (4,388), Jalpai (19,447), Shyamsundarpur (4,759), Shridharpur (5,035), Basudebpur (4,739), Kumarara (4,231), Mahammadpur (4,614), Madhabpur (4,055), Kalyanpur (5,421) and Terapara Jalpai (4,801).

=== Literacy ===
As per 2011 census the total number of literates in Nandakumar CD Block was 198,153 (85.56% of the population over 6 years) out of which 108,428 (55%) were males and 89,725 (45%) were females.

As per 2011 census, literacy in Purba Medinipur district was 87.02%. Purba Medinipur had the highest literacy amongst all the districts of West Bengal in 2011.

See also – List of West Bengal districts ranked by literacy rate

Literacy in CD blocks of
Purba Medinipur district
Tamluk subdivision
Tamluk – 87.06%
Sahid Matangini – 86.99%
Panskura I – 83.65%
Panskura II – 84.93%
Nandakumar – 85.56%
Chandipur – 87.81%
Moyna – 86.33%
Haldia subdivision
Mahishadal – 86.21%
Nandigram I – 84.89%
Nandigram II – 89.16%
Sutahata – 85.42%
Haldia – 85.96%
Contai subdivision
Contai I – 89.32%
Contai II – 88.33%
Contai III – 89.88%
Khejuri I – 88.90%
Khejuri II – 85.37%
Ramnagar I – 87.84%
Ramnagar II – 89.38%
Bhagabanpur II – 90.98%
Egra subdivision
Bhagabanpur I – 88.13%
Egra I – 82.83%
Egra II – 86.47%
Patashpur I – 86.58%
Patashpur II – 86.50%
2011 Census: CD Block Wise

Primary Census Abstract Data

=== Language and religion ===
Religion in Nandakumar CD block (2011)
Hinduism	87.64%
Islam	12.24%
Other or not stated	0.12%

In 2011 census Hindus numbered 230,480 and formed 87.64% of the population in Nandakumar CD Block. Muslims numbered 32,197 and formed 12.24% of the population. Others numbered 321 and formed 0.12% of the population. In 2001, Hindus made up 88.89% and Muslims 11.07% of the population respectively.

Bengali is the predominant language, spoken by 99.81% of the population.

== Rural poverty ==
The District Human Development Report for Purba Medinipur has provided a CD Block-wise data table for Modified Human Poverty Index of the district. Nandakumar CD Block registered 23.89 on the MHPI scale. The CD Block-wise mean MHPI was estimated at 24.78. Eleven out of twentyfive CD Blocks were found to be severely deprived in respect of grand CD Block average value of MHPI (CD Blocks with lower amount of poverty are better): All the CD Blocks of Haldia and Contai subdivisions appeared backward, except Ramnagar I & II, of all the blocks of Egra subdivision only Bhagabanpur I appeared backward and in Tamluk subdivision none appeared backward.

== Economy ==
=== Livelihood ===
In Nandakumar CD Block in 2011, total workers formed 39.39% of the total population and amongst the class of total workers, cultivators formed 18.47%, agricultural labourers 34.15%, household industry workers 11.92% and other workers 35.46%.

=== Infrastructure ===
There are 100 inhabited villages in Nandakumar CD block. All 100 villages (100%) have power supply. All 100 villages (100%) have drinking water supply. 21 villages (21%) have post offices. 90 villages (90%) have telephones (including landlines, public call offices and mobile phones). 39 villages (39%) have a pucca (paved) approach road and 51 villages (51%) have transport communication (includes bus service, rail facility and navigable waterways). 18 villages (18%) have agricultural credit societies. 17 villages (17%) have banks.

In 2007–08, around 40% of rural households in the district had electricity.

In 2013–14, there were 28 fertiliser depots, 12 seed stores and 42 fair price shops in the CD Block.

=== Agriculture ===
Persons engaged in agriculture
in Nandakumar CD Block
1. Bargadars (5.31%)
2. Patta holders (6.96%)
3. Small farmers (1.71%)
4. Marginal farmers (34.2%)
5. Agricultural labourers (51.8%)

According to the District Human Development Report of Purba Medinipur: The agricultural sector is the lifeline of a predominantly rural economy. It is largely dependent on the Low Capacity Deep Tubewells (around 50%) or High Capacity Deep Tubewells (around 27%) for irrigation, as the district does not have a good network of canals, compared to some of the neighbouring districts. In many cases the canals are drainage canals which get the backflow of river water at times of high tide or the rainy season. The average size of land holding in Purba Medinipur, in 2005–06, was 0.73 hectares against 1.01 hectares in West Bengal.

In 2013–14, the total area irrigated in Nandakumar CD Block was 7,835 hectares, out of which 300 hectares were irrigated with canal water, 1,350 hectares by tank water, 105 hectares by deep tube wells, 610 hectares by shallow tube wells, 410 hectares by river lift irrigation and 5,060 hectares by other means.

Although the Bargadari Act of 1950 recognised the rights of bargadars to a higher share of crops from the land that they tilled, it was not implemented fully. Large tracts, beyond the prescribed limit of land ceiling, remained with the rich landlords. From 1977 onwards major land reforms took place in West Bengal. Land in excess of land ceiling was acquired and distributed amongst the peasants. Following land reforms land ownership pattern has undergone transformation. In 2013–14, persons engaged in agriculture in Nandakumar CD Block could be classified as follows: bargadars 5.31%, patta (document) holders 6.96%, small farmers (possessing land between 1 and 2 hectares) 1.71%, marginal farmers (possessing land up to 1 hectare) 34.23% and agricultural labourers 51.79%.

In 2013–14, Nandakumar CD Block produced 1,505 tonnes of Aman paddy, the main winter crop, from 2,441 hectares, 32,707 tonnes of Boro paddy, the spring crop, from 9,327 hectares and 2,126 tonnes of potatoes from 72 hectares. It also produced pulses and oil seeds.

Betelvine is a major source of livelihood in Purba Medinipur district, particularly in Tamluk and Contai subdivisions. Betelvine production in 2008–09 was the highest amongst all the districts and was around a third of the total state production. In 2008–09, Purba Mednipur produced 2,789 tonnes of cashew nuts from 3,340 hectares of land.

Concentration of Handicraft Activities in CD Blocks
- Horn Craft – Kolaghat
- Pata Chitra – Chandipur, Nandakumar
- Sea Shell – Ramnagar I & II
- Mat & Mat Diversified Products – Ramnagar I, Egra I & II, Patashpur I
- Brass & Bell Metal – Ramnagar I, Mahisadal, Patashpur II, Egra I
- Diversified Jute Products – Ramnagar II, Nandakumar, Kolaghat, Shahid Matangini
- Cane & Bamboo Products – Chandipur, Nandakumar, Kolaghat, Shahid Matangini
- Sola Craft – Tamluk, Kolaghat
- Pottery/Terracotta – Panskura, Tamluk, Sahid Matangini, Nandakumar
- Wood Craft – Tamluk
- Zari work - Sutahta, Mahisadal, Haldia, Nandakumar

Source: District Human Development Report, Purba Medinipur, Page 97

=== Pisciculture ===
Purba Medinipur's net district domestic product derives one fifth of its earnings from fisheries, the highest amongst all the districts of West Bengal. The nett area available for effective pisciculture in Nandakumar CD Block in 2013–14 was 712.50 hectares. 3,880 persons were engaged in the profession and approximate annual production was 27,146 quintals.

=== Banking ===
In 2013–14, Nandakumar CD Block had offices of 7 commercial banks and 1 gramin bank.

=== Backward Regions Grant Fund ===
Medinipur East district is listed as a backward region and receives financial support from the Backward Regions Grant Fund. The fund, created by the Government of India, is designed to redress regional imbalances in development. As of 2012, 272 districts across the country were listed under this scheme. The list includes 11 districts of West Bengal.

== Transport ==
Nandakumar CD Block has 1 ferry services and 10 originating/ terminating bus routes.

Nandakumar railway station is situated on the Tamluk-Digha line, constructed in 2003–04.

NH 116, from Kolaghat to Haldia, passes through this block.

== Education ==
In 2013–14, Nandakumar CD Block had 163 primary schools with 12,345 students, 19 middle schools with 847 students, 8 high schools with 6,378 students and 20 higher secondary schools with 23,115 students. Nandakumar CD Block had 1 general college with 1,068 students, 379institutions for special and non-formal education with 16,703 students.

As per the 2011 census, in Nandakumar CD block, amongst the 100 inhabited villages, 1 village did not have a school, 56 villages had two or more primary schools, 47 villages had at least 1 primary and 1 middle school and 29 villages had at least 1 middle and 1 secondary school.

Maharaja Nandakumar Mahavidyalaya was established at Bhabanipur in 2007. It is affiliated with Vidyasagar University.

== Healthcare ==
In 2014, Nandakumar CD Block had 1 block primary health centre, 2 primary health centres, and 1 private nursing home with total 50 beds and 10 doctors (excluding private bodies). It had 40 family welfare sub centres. 4,288 patients were treated indoor and 160,721 patients were treated outdoor in the hospitals, health centres and subcentres of the CD Block.

Khejurberia Rural Hospital at Khejurberia, PO Nandakumar (with 30 beds) is the main medical facility in Nandakumar CD block. There are primary health centres at Dakshin Damodarpur (with 10 beds) and Dakshin Gumai, PO Kalyanchak (with 2 beds).
