= Tamluk (community development block) =

- Community development block
- Coordinates: 22.3151430°N 87.8473663°E
- Country: India
- State: West Bengal
- District: Purba Medinipur

Government
  - Type: Community development block

Area
  - Total: 123.50 km^{2} (47.68 sq mi)
- Elevation: 6 m (20 ft)

Population (2011)
  - Total: 217,776
  - Density: 1,763.4/km^{2} (4,567.1/sq mi)

Languages
  - Official: Bengali, English
- Time zone: UTC+5:30 (IST)
- PIN: 721636 (Tamluk); 721653 (Chanserpur)
- Area code: 03228
- ISO 3166 code: IN-WB
- Vehicle registration: WB-29, WB-30, WB-31, WB-32, WB-33
- Literacy: 87.06%
- Lok Sabha constituency: Tamluk
- Vidhan Sabha constituency: Moyna, Nandakumar, Tamluk
- Website: purbamedinipur.gov.in

Tamluk is a community development block that forms an administrative division in Tamluk subdivision of Purba Medinipur district in the Indian state of West Bengal.

== History ==
=== Tamralipta ===
Tamralipta, the port in ancient India, is believed by scholars to have been around modern-day Tamluk. It is mentioned in the writings of Ptolemy (150 AD), the Greco-Egyptian writer, Faxian (earlier referred to as Fa Hien) (405-11 AD), the Chinese Buddhist monk, who travelled to India on foot, and Xuanzang (earlier referred to as Hiuen Tsiang) (seventh century AD), the Chinese Buddhist monk, scholar, traveller and translator. It was the main port used by Ashoka, the Mauryan emperor. With too much siltation the port lost its importance around the 8th century A.D.

== Geography ==
Purba Medinipur district is part of the lower Indo-Gangetic Plain and Eastern coastal plains. Topographically, the district can be divided into two parts – (a) almost entirely flat plains on the west, east and north, (b) the coastal plains on the south. The vast expanse of land is formed of alluvium and is composed of younger and coastal alluvial. The elevation of the district is within 10 metres above mean sea level. The district has a long coastline of 65.5 km along its southern and south eastern boundary. Five coastal CD Blocks, namely, Khejuri II, Contai II (Deshapran), Contai I, Ramnagar I and II, are occasionally affected by cyclones and tornadoes. Tidal floods are quite regular in these five CD Blocks. Normally floods occur in 21 of the 25 CD Blocks in the district. The major rivers are Haldi, Rupnarayan, Rasulpur, Bagui and Keleghai, flowing in north to south or south-east direction. River water is an important source of irrigation. The district has a low 899 hectare forest cover, which is 0.02% of its geographical area.

Naikuri is located at 22°18′55″N 87°50′51″E.

Tamluk CD Block is bounded by Panskura, Kolaghat and Sahid Matangini CD Blocks in the north, Shyampur I and Shyampur II CD Blocks, in Howrah district across the Rupnarayan, in the east, Nandakumar CD Block in the south and Moyna CD Block in the west.

It is located to the west of Tamluk, the district headquarters.

Tamluk CD Block has an area of 123.50 km^{2}. It has 1 panchayat samity, 12 gram panchayats, 161 gram sansads (village councils), 107 mouzas and 99 inhabited villages. Tamluk police station serves this block. Headquarters of this CD Block is at Tamluk.

Gram panchayats of Tamluk block/ panchayat samiti are: Anantapur I, Anantapur II, Bishnubar I, Bishnubar II, Nilkuntha, Padumpur I, Padumpur II, Pipulberia I, Pipulberia II, Srirampur I and Srirampur II, Uttar Sonamui.

== Demographics ==
=== Population ===
As per 2011 Census of India Tamluk CD Block had a total population of 217,776, of which 207,064 were rural and 10,712 were urban. There were 112,458 (52%) males and 105,398 (48%) females. Population below 6 years was 25,516. Scheduled Castes numbered 21,145 (9.71%) and Scheduled Tribes numbered 67 (0.03%).

As per 2001 census, Tamluk block had a total population of 204,406, out of which 104,982 were males and 91,424 were females. Tamluk block registered a population growth of 12.06 per cent during the 1991-2001 decade. Decadal growth for the combined Midnapore district was 14.87 per cent. Decadal growth in West Bengal was 17.84 per cent.

Census Towns in Tamluk CD Block (2011 census figures in brackets): Anantapur (5,532), Dakshin Baguan (5,180).

Large villages (with 4,000+ population) in Tamluk CD Block (2011 census figures in brackets): Harashankar (4,379), Nilkanthia (5,236), Bishnubar (4,957), Babarya (4,692), Putputya (5,300), Srirampur (10,906), Purbba Nukha (4,766), Simulia (6,384), Mirikpur (4,865) and Uttar Sonamul (4,711).

=== Literacy ===
As per 2011 census the total number of literates in Tamluk CD Block was 167,388 (87.06% of the population over 6 years) out of which 92,018 (55%) were males and 75,370 (45%) were females. As per 2011 census, literacy in Purba Medinipur district was 87.02%. Purba Medinipur had the highest literacy amongst all the districts of West Bengal in 2011.

See also – List of West Bengal districts ranked by literacy rate

Literacy in CD blocks of
Purba Medinipur district
Tamluk subdivision
Tamluk – 87.06%
Sahid Matangini – 86.99%
Panskura I – 83.65%
Panskura II – 84.93%
Nandakumar – 85.56%
Chandipur – 87.81%
Moyna – 86.33%
Haldia subdivision
Mahishadal – 86.21%
Nandigram I – 84.89%
Nandigram II – 89.16%
Sutahata – 85.42%
Haldia – 85.96%
Contai subdivision
Contai I – 89.32%
Contai II – 88.33%
Contai III – 89.88%
Khejuri I – 88.90%
Khejuri II – 85.37%
Ramnagar I – 87.84%
Ramnagar II – 89.38%
Bhagabanpur II – 90.98%
Egra subdivision
Bhagabanpur I – 88.13%
Egra I – 82.83%
Egra II – 86.47%
Patashpur I – 86.58%
Patashpur II – 86.50%
2011 Census: CD Block Wise

Primary Census Abstract Data

=== Language and religion ===
Religion in Tamluk CD block (2011)
Hinduism	81.04%
Islam	18.81%
Other or not stated	0.15%

In 2011 census Hindus numbered 176,478 and formed 81.04% of the population in Tamluk CD Block. Muslims numbered 40,977 and formed 18.81% of the population. Others numbered 321 and formed 0.15% of the population. In 2001, Hindus made up 83.80% and Muslims 16.17% of the population respectively.

Bengali is the predominant language, spoken by 99.10% of the population.

== Rural poverty ==
The District Human Development Report for Purba Medinipur has provided a CD Block-wise data table for Modified Human Poverty Index of the district. Tamluk CD Block registered 24.38 on the MHPI scale. The CD Block-wise mean MHPI was estimated at 24.9. Eleven out of twentyfive CD Blocks were found to be severely deprived in respect of grand CD Block average value of MHPI (CD Blocks with lower amount of poverty are better): All the CD Blocks of Haldia and Contai subdivisions appeared backward, except Ramnagar I & II, of all the blocks of Egra subdivision only Bhagabanpur I appeared backward and in Tamluk subdivision none appeared backward.

== Economy ==
=== Livelihood ===
In Tamluk CD Block in 2011, total workers formed 40.43% of the total population and amongst the class of total workers, cultivators formed 17.91%, agricultural labourers 35.66%, household industry workers 9.31% and other workers 37.11%.

=== Infrastructure ===
There are 99 inhabited villages in Tamluk CD block. All 99 villages (100%) have power supply. 98 villages (98.99%) have drinking water supply. 20 villages (20.2%) have post offices. 96 villages (96.97%) have telephones (including landlines, public call offices and mobile phones). 24 villages (24.24%) have a pucca (paved) approach road and 40 villages (40.40%) have transport communication (includes bus service, rail facility and navigable waterways). 31 villages (31.31%) have agricultural credit societies. 9 villages (9.09%) have banks.

In 2007-08, around 40% of rural households in the district had electricity.

In 2013-14, there were 32 fertiliser depots, 24 seed stores and 33 fair price shops in the CD Block.

=== Agriculture ===
Persons engaged in agriculture
in Tamluk CD Block
1. Bargadars (5.22%)
2. Patta holders (2.69%)
3. Small farmers (1.04%)
4. Marginal farmers (34.6%)
5. Agricultural labourers (56.5%)

According to the District Human Development Report of Purba Medinipur: The agricultural sector is the lifeline of a predominantly rural economy. It is largely dependent on the Low Capacity Deep Tubewells (around 50%) or High Capacity Deep Tubewells (around 27%) for irrigation, as the district does not have a good network of canals, compared to some of the neighbouring districts. In many cases the canals are drainage canals which get the backflow of river water at times of high tide or the rainy season. The average size of land holding in Purba Medinipur, in 2005-06, was 0.73 hectares against 1.01 hectares in West Bengal. In 2013-14, the total area irrigated in Tamluk CD Block was 7,516 hectares, out 500 hectares were irrigated by tank water, 700 hectares by deep tube wells, 16 hectares by shallow tube wells, 100 hectares by river lift irrigation and 6,200 hectares by other means.

Although the Bargadari Act of 1950 recognised the rights of bargadars to a higher share of crops from the land that they tilled, it was not implemented fully. Large tracts, beyond the prescribed limit of land ceiling, remained with the rich landlords. From 1977 onwards major land reforms took place in West Bengal. Land in excess of land ceiling was acquired and distributed amongst the peasants. Following land reforms land ownership pattern has undergone transformation. In 2013-14, persons engaged in agriculture in Tamluk CD Block could be classified as follows: bargadars 5.22%, patta (document) holders 2.69%, small farmers (possessing land between 1 and 2 hectares) 1.04%, marginal farmers (possessing land up to 1 hectare) 34.57% and agricultural labourers 56.49%.

In 2013-14, Tamluk CD Block produced 895 tonnes of Aman paddy, the main winter crop, from 1,432 hectares, 17,889 tonnes of Boro paddy, the spring crop, from 4,885 hectares, 3 tonnes of Aus paddy, the summer crop, from 4 hectares, 1,322 tonnes of wheat from 504 hectares, 785 tonne of jute from 58 hectares and 15 tonnes of potatoes from 1 hectare. It also produced pulses and oil seeds.

Betelvine is a major source of livelihood in Purba Medinipur district, particularly in Tamluk and Contai subdivisions. Betelvine production in 2008-09 was the highest amongst all the districts and was around a third of the total state production. In 2008-09, Purba Mednipur produced 2,789 tonnes of cashew nuts from 3,340 hectares of land.

Concentration of Handicraft Activities in CD Blocks
- Horn Craft - Kolaghat
- Pata Chitra - Chandipur, Nandakumar
- Sea Shell – Ramnagar I & II
- Mat & Mat Diversified Products – Ramnagar I, Egra I & II, Patashpur I
- Brass & Bell Metal – Ramnagar I, Mahisadal, Patashpur II, Egra I
- Diversified Jute Products – Ramnagar II, Nandakumar, Kolaghat, Shahid Matangini
- Cane & Bamboo Products - Chandipur, Nandakumar, Kolaghat, Shahid Matangini
- Sola Craft - Tamluk, Kolaghat
- Pottery/Terracotta - Panskura, Tamluk, Sahid Matangini, Nandakumar
- Wood Craft - Tamluk
- Zari work - Sutahta, Mahisadal, Haldia, Nandakumar

Source: District Human Development Report, Purba Medinipur, Page 97

=== Pisciculture ===
Purba Medinipur's net district domestic product derives one fifth of its earnings from fisheries, the highest amongst all the districts of West Bengal. The nett area available for effective pisciculture in Tamluk CD Block in 2013-14 was 876.00 hectares. 4,126 persons were engaged in the profession and approximate annual production was 33,376 quintals.

=== Banking ===
In 2013-14, Tamluk CD Block had offices of 7 commercial banks and 2 gramin banks.

=== Backward Regions Grant Fund ===
Medinipur East district is listed as a backward region and receives financial support from the Backward Regions Grant Fund. The fund, created by the Government of India, is designed to redress regional imbalances in development. As of 2012, 272 districts across the country were listed under this scheme. The list includes 11 districts of West Bengal.

== Transport ==
Tamluk CD Block has 36 originating/ terminating bus routes.The Major Bus Routes are Mecheda - Haldia via Tamluk Town and Tamluk Highroad, Digha - Kolkata via Tamluk Highroad, Tamluk - Panskura, Mecheda - Balaipanda via Tamluk Town and Highroad, Nandigram - Mecheda via Tamluk Town, Digha - Burdwan, Haldia - Medinipur, Haldia - Jhargram etc.

Tamluk Junction is a Major station on the Panskura-Haldia line & Tamluk-Digha Branch line. The line was constructed in 1968 and was electrified in 1974-76. Other Stations are Sahid matangini and Rajgoda.

NH 116, from Kolaghat to Haldia, passes through this block. Connects Tamluk, Nandakumar, Mecheda etc. SH4 also Passes through this Block.

== Education ==
In 2013-14, Tamluk CD Block had 145 primary schools with 10,597 students, 6 middle schools with 552 students, 10 high schools with 6,923 students and 20 higher secondary schools with 22,595 students. Tamluk CD Block had 5 technical/ professional institutions with 208 students and 368 institutions for special and non-formal education with 17,317 students.

As per the 2011 census, in Tamluk CD block, amongst the 91 inhabited villages, 2 villages did not have a school, 46 villages had two or more primary schools, 32 villages had at least 1 primary and 1 middle school and 21 villages had at least 1 middle and 1 secondary school.

Tamralipta Mahavidyalaya was established at Tamluk (outside this block) in 1948. It is affiliated with Vidyasagar University. It offers courses in arts, science, commerce and education.

Tamralipta Institute of Management & Technology was established at Tamluk Town in 2007. It is affiliated to Maulana Abdul Kalam Azad University of Technology. It offers courses like B.Tech in Computer Science, Electrical, Electronics, Civil, Automobile etc. Also offers BBA in Hospital Management, Hotel Management, BCA, MCA etc.

Shahid Matangini Hazra Government College for Women was established in 2015 at Chak Srikrishnapur, PO Kulberia, Tamluk. It offers courses in arts, science, commerce and education.

Tamralipta Govt. medical College was established in 2021. It is the only Govt. Medical college of the district. It offers MBBS Degree with 200 seats.

== Healthcare ==
In 2014, Tamluk CD Block had 1 block primary health centre, 2 primary health centres, and 3 private nursing homes with total 65 beds and 4 doctors (excluding private bodies). It had 34 family welfare sub centres. 1,562 patients were treated indoor and 112,955 patients were treated outdoor in the hospitals, health centres and subcentres of the CD Block.

Anantapur Rural Hospital at Anantapur, PO Chanserpur (with 30 beds) is the main medical facility in Tamluk CD block. There is a primary health centre at Kelomal Purbanakha, PO Putputia (with 10 beds).
