= Majna =

- Village
- Location in West Bengal, India Majna (India)
- Coordinates: 21.77565°N 87.67496°E
- Country: India
- State: West Bengal
- District: Purba Medinipur

Population (2011)
  - Total: 4,653

Languages
  - Official: Bengali, English
- Time zone: UTC+5:30 (IST)
- PIN: 721433 (Majna)
- Telephone/STD code: 03220
- Lok Sabha constituency: Kanthi
- Vidhan Sabha constituency: Kanthi Dakshin
- Website: purbamedinipur.gov.in

For a related disambiguation page see Moyna

Majna is a village in Contai I CD block in Contai subdivision of Purba Medinipur district in the state of West Bengal, India.

== Geography ==
Cities and towns in Contai subdivision of Purba Medinipur district
M: municipal city/ town, CT: census town, R: rural/ urban centre, H: historical/ religious centre, S: port, sea-beach
Owing to space constraints in the small map, the actual locations in a larger map may vary slightly

=== Location ===
Majna is located at 21.77565°N 87.67496°E.

=== Urbanisation ===
93.55% of the population of Contai subdivision live in the rural areas. Only 6.45% of the population live in the urban areas and it is considerably behind Haldia subdivision in urbanization, where 20.81% of the population live in urban areas.

Note: The map alongside presents some of the notable locations in the subdivision. All places marked in the map are linked in the larger full screen map.

== Demographics ==
As per 2011 Census of India Majna had a total population of 4,653 of which 2,358 (51%) were males and 2,295 (49%) were females. Population below 6 years was 602. The total number of literates in Majna was 3,272 (80.77% of the population over 6 years).

== Transport ==
A short stretch of a local road links Majna to State Highway 5.

There is a station at Sitalpur, located nearby, on the Tamluk-Digha line.

== Healthcare ==
Majna Block Primary Health Centre at Majna (with 15 beds) is the main medical facility in Contai I CD block. There are primary health centres at Kulberia (with 6 beds) and Nayaput (with 10 beds).
