= Dholmari =

- Village
- Location in West Bengal, India Dholmari (India)
- Coordinates: 21.827767°N 87.831981°E
- Country: India
- State: West Bengal
- District: Purba Medinipur

Population (2011)
  - Total: 1,948

Languages
  - Official: Bengali, English
- Time zone: UTC+5:30 (IST)
- PIN: 721442 (Basantia)
- Telephone/STD code: 03210
- Lok Sabha constituency: Kanthi
- Vidhan Sabha constituency: Kanthi Uttar
- Website: purbamedinipur.gov.in

Dholmari is a village, in Deshapran CD block in Contai subdivision of Purba Medinipur district in the state of West Bengal, India.

== Geography ==
Cities and towns in Contai subdivision of Purba Medinipur district
M: municipal city/ town, CT: census town, R: rural/ urban centre, H: historical/ religious centre, S: port, sea-beach
Owing to space constraints in the small map, the actual locations in a larger map may vary slightly

=== CD block HQ ===
The headquarters of Deshapran CD block are located at Dholmari.

=== Urbanisation ===
93.55% of the population of Contai subdivision live in the rural areas. Only 6.45% of the population live in the urban areas and it is considerably behind Haldia subdivision in urbanization, where 20.81% of the population live in urban areas.

Note: The map alongside presents some of the notable locations in the subdivision. All places marked in the map are linked in the larger full screen map.

== Demographics ==
As per 2011 Census of India Dholmari had a total population of 1,948 of which 1,011 (52%) were males and 937 (48%) were females. Population below 6 years was 218. The total number of literates in Dholmari was 1,531 (88.50% of the population over 6 years).
