= Kamarda =

- Village
- Location in West Bengal, India Kamarda (India)
- Coordinates: 21°51′54.0″N 87°43′52.3″E
- Country: India
- State: West Bengal
- District: Purba Medinipur

Population (2011)
  - Total: 11,658

Languages
  - Official: Bengali, English
- Time zone: UTC+5:30 (IST)
- PIN: 721432 (Kamarda Bazar)
- Lok Sabha constituency: Kanthi
- Vidhan Sabha constituency: Khejuri
- Website: purbamedinipur.gov.in

Kamarda is a village, in Khejuri I CD block in Contai subdivision of Purba Medinipur district in the state of West Bengal, India.

== Geography ==
Cities and towns in Contai subdivision of Purba Medinipur district
M: municipal city/ town, CT: census town, R: rural/ urban centre, H: historical/ religious centre, S: port, sea-beach
Owing to space constraints in the small map, the actual locations in a larger map may vary slightly

=== CD block HQ ===
The headquarters of Khejuri I CD block are located at Kamarda.

=== Urbanisation ===
93.55% of the population of Contai subdivision live in the rural areas. Only 6.45% of the population live in the urban areas and it is considerably behind Haldia subdivision in urbanization, where 20.81% of the population live in urban areas.

Note: The map alongside presents some of the notable locations in the subdivision. All places marked in the map are linked in the larger full screen map.

== Demographics ==
As per 2011 Census of India Kamarda had a total population of 11,658 of which 6,023 (52%) were males and 5,635 (48%) were females. Population below 6 years was 1,602. The total number of literates in Kamarda was 8,648 (86.00% of the population over 6 years).

== Transport ==
The nearest railway station is at Nachinda on the Panskura-Digha branch line.

National Highway 116B (locally popular as Contai-Digha Highway) passes nearby.

== Education ==
Kamarda High School is a Bengali-medium co-educational higher secondary school. It was established in 1921 and has arrangements for teaching from class V to XII. It has a library with 2,500 books and a play ground.

== Healthcare ==
Kamarda Block Primary Health Centre at Kamarda Bazar (with 15 beds) is the main medical facility in Khejuri I CD block. There is a primary health centre at Heria (with 10 beds).
