= Kakdwip Fishing Harbour =

Coordinates: 21°51′52″N 88°10′28″E

Location
- Country: India
- Location: Kakdwip, South 24 Parganas, West Bengal

Details
- Operated by: West Bengal Fisheries Department
- Owned by: West Bengal
- Type of harbour: river port
- No. of berths: 1

Statistics
- Vessel arrivals: 200 per day

Kakdwip Fishing Harbour is located at Kakdwip in South Twenty-four Parganas in the coastal district of West Bengal, India. It is an important full-fledged fishing port. The port was developed in the left-front period. The port serves the coastal area and fish trawler from deep seas anchor in this port.

== Location ==
Kakdwip fishing port is located at Kakdwip in South 24 Parganas district of West Bengal, on the banks of river Muriganga, in the Kalnaagini canal. The port is about 130 kilometers away from Kolkata.

== Details ==
The Kakadipu fishing port is actually a place where fishing boats or trawlers are anchored in a non-organized manner for loading, unloading and repairing and shelter. This place has long-term demand for fishing in fish fishing as well as for organizing fishing business at the same time. Department of Fisheries, Government of West Bengal, establishes the modern fishing port, which provides 50% of the cost to the Indian government and 50% of the state government. Minister Kiranmoya hoped for the success of the port of Nanda. Briath Barn Construction Limited (a government in India inaugurated the Calcutta) was the contractor for the project. Expert for the fishing support project in West Bengal, a consultancy firm, Associate and Associate, a project company in West Bengal. Chief person Gautam Banerjee, Principal Architect for Project Planning and Design The project is composed of RCT jetty built under 650 mm thick diaphrram wall. This method is applied to a wall of the jetty area and it was first introduced in West Bengal, for the first time in India.

== Problem ==
Although the port has a lot of potential, it is also in trouble. The main problem is Kalnagini Reduces navigability of the canal. Kalanagani Canal was quite deep during the construction of the port, but some of the port constructions In the year the silt remains in the canal. Now there is no water in the canal during the time of the tide, as a result of which the fish laden trawlers or ships turnover Waiting for the tide in the river Ganges. There is no ice mill which is essential for the fishing port. There is no dry dock for ship repairs. Wireless systems do not have to keep in touch with fishing trawlers or ships.
