= Durmut =

Durmut Durmuth
- Small Town
- Location in West Bengal, India Durmut (India)
- Coordinates: 21.810767°N 87.773981°E
- Country: India
- State: West Bengal
- District: East Medinipur

Population (2011)
  - Total: 4,617

Languages
  - Official: Bengali, English
- Time zone: UTC+5:30 (IST)
- PIN: 721401 (Contai)
- Telephone/STD code: 03220
- Lok Sabha constituency: Contai
- Vidhan Sabha constituency: Contai South
- Website: purbamedinipur.gov.in

Durmut (also spelled Durmuth) is a small town in Contai 3 CD Block in Contai subdivision of East Medinipur district in the state of West Bengal, India.

== Geography ==
Cities and towns in Contai subdivision of Purba Medinipur district
M: municipal city/ town, CT: census town, R: rural/ urban centre, H: historical/ religious site, S: port, sea-beach
Owing to space constraints in the small map, the actual locations in a larger map may vary slightly

=== Location ===
Durmut is located at 21.810767°N 87.773981°E.

=== Urbanisation ===
93.55% of the population of Contai subdivision live in the rural areas. Only 6.45% of the population live in the urban areas and it is considerably behind Haldia subdivision in urbanization, where 20.81% of the population live in urban areas.

Note: The map alongside presents some of the notable locations in the subdivision. All places marked in the map are linked in the larger full screen map.

== Demographics ==
As per 2011 Census of India Durmut had a total population of 4,617 of which 2,378 (52%) were males and 2,239 (48%) were females. Population below 6 years was 461. The total number of literates in Durmut was 3,648 (87.78% of the population over 6 years).

== Transport ==
Durmut is off National Highway 116B (Digha Road).

== Education ==
Deshapran Mahavidyalaya at Durmuth was established in 2010 and offers courses in arts.
