= Depal =

- Village
- Location in Purba Medinipur, West Bengal, India
- Coordinates: 21.733123°N 87.547885°E
- Country: India
- State: West Bengal
- District: Purba Medinipur

Government
  - Type: Taluk of Ramnagar II Block, West Bengal, India

Languages
  - Official: Bengali, English
- Time zone: UTC+5:30 (IST)
- PIN: 721453
- Area code: 03220
- ISO 3166 code: IN-WB
- Vehicle registration: WB-29, WB-30, WB-31, WB-32, WB-33
- Literacy: 87.84%
- Lok Sabha constituency: Kanthi
- Vidhan Sabha constituency: Ramnagar
- Website: http://purbamedinipur.gov.in

Depal is a village and a gram panchayat in Ramnagar II Block in Contai subdivision of Purba Medinipur district in the Indian state of West Bengal.

== Geography ==
Cities and towns in Contai subdivision of Purba Medinipur district
M: municipal city/ town, CT: census town, R: rural/ urban centre, H: historical/ religious centre, S: port, sea-beach
Owing to space constraints in the small map, the actual locations in a larger map may vary slightly

=== Location ===
Depal is located at 21.733123°N 87.547885°E.

=== Urbanisation ===
93.55% of the population of Contai subdivision live in the rural areas. Only 6.45% of the population live in the urban areas and it is considerably behind Haldia subdivision in urbanization, where 20.81% of the population live in urban areas.

Note: The map alongside presents some of the notable locations in the subdivision. All places marked in the map are linked in the larger full screen map.

== Demographics ==
As per 2011 Census of India, Depal had a total population of 3,359, of which 1,705 (51%) were males and 1,654 (49%) were females. Population below 6 years was 294. The total number of literates in Depal was 2,782 (90.77% of the population over 6 years).

== Transport ==
Depal stands at the junction point of Depal-Majna-Kanthi Road and Egra-Ramnagar Road.

== Education ==
Ramnagar College at Depal was established in 1972. In addition to courses in arts, science and commerce, it offers courses in hospitality and tourism, and fishery and farm management.

Ramnagar B.Ed College at Depal offers graduation courses in education.

== Healthcare ==
There is a primary health centre at Hamirpur, PO Depal (with 2 beds).
