= Primary Agricultural Credit Society =

PACS primary Agriculture credit society

- Founder: Government of India
- Location: India
- Affiliations: Cooperative Societies India

A Primary Agricultural Credit Society (PACS) is a basic unit and smallest co-operative credit institutions in India. It works on the grassroots level (gram panchayat and village level).

PACS structure

== State-wise number of PACS ==
State	2020	2022
Northern region	11558	16,431
Chandigarh	16	117
Haryana	640	1213
Himachal Pradesh	2117	4,166
Jammu & Kashmir	765	620
Punjab	1609	3,543
Rajasthan	6411	6,472
North-Eastern region	3500	3,396
Arunachal Pradesh	34	34
Assam	766	766
Manipur	232	90
Meghalaya	179	179
Mizoram	133	164
Nagaland	1719	1,719
Sikkim	169	176
Tripura	268	268
Eastern region	19,421	18,620
Andaman & Nicobar Islands	46	51
Bihar	8463	8,463
Jharkhand	498	n.a.
Odisha	2452	2,701
West Bengal	7962	7,405
Central region	15357	15,478
Chhattisgarh	1213	1,333
Madhya Pradesh	4457	4,457
Uttarakhand	759	759
Uttar Pradesh	8929	8,929
Western region	29633	29,797
Goa	77	81
Gujarat	8154	8,535
Maharashtra	21402	21,181
Southern region	14525	14,516
Andhra Pradesh	2058	1,818
Karnataka	4740	4799
Kerala	1566	5,679
Puducherry	53	1,647
Tamil Nadu	4538	4450
Telangana	906	906
All India	93995	99,635
