= Garh Kamalpur =

- Census Town
- Location in West Bengal, India Garh Kamalpur (India)
- Coordinates: 22.187333°N 87.988353°E
- Country: India
- State: West Bengal
- District: Purba Medinipur

Area
  - Total: 1.6341 km^{2} (0.6309 sq mi)

Population (2011)
  - Total: 6,664
  - Density: 4,078/km^{2} (10,560/sq mi)

Languages
  - Official: Bengali, English
- Time zone: UTC+5:30 (IST)
- PIN: 721628 (Garh Kamalpur)
- Telephone/STD code: 03224
- Lok Sabha constituency: Tamluk
- Vidhan Sabha constituency: Mahisadal
- Website: purbamedinipur.gov.in

Garh Kamalpur is a census town in Mahishadal CD block in Haldia subdivision of Purba Medinipur district in the state of West Bengal, India.

== Geography ==
Cities and towns in Haldia subdivision of Purba Medinipur district
M: municipal city/ town, CT: census town, R: rural/ urban centre, S: port
Owing to space constraints in the small map, the actual locations in a larger map may vary slightly

=== Location ===
Garh Kamalpur is located at 22.187333°N 87.988353°E.

=== Urbanisation ===
79.19% of the population of Haldia subdivision live in the rural areas. Only 20.81% of the population live in the urban areas, and that is the highest proportion of urban population amongst the four subdivisions in Purba Medinipur district.

Note: The map alongside presents some of the notable locations in the subdivision. All places marked in the map are linked in the larger full screen map.

== Demographics ==
As per 2011 Census of India Garh Kamalpur had a total population of 6,664 of which 3,368 (51%) were males and 3,296 (49%) were females. Population below 6 years was 639. The total number of literates in Garh Kamalpur was 5,406 (89.73% of the population over 6 years).

== Infrastructure ==
As per the District Census Handbook 2011, Garh Kamalpur covered an area of 1.6341 km^{2}. It had the facility of both a railway station and bus routes at Mahishadal nearby. Amongst the civic amenities it had 615 domestic electric connections. Amongst the medical facilities it had a hospital nearby and 22 medicine shops in the town. Amongst the educational facilities it had were 4 primary schools, 2 middle schools, 2 secondary school, 2 senior secondary schools and a degree college. Amongst the recreational and cultural facilities a cinema theatre, an auditorium/ community hall, a public library and a reading room were there in the town.

== Transport ==
Garh Kamalpur is on the Haldia-Tamluk-Mecheda Road. Mahishadal railway station and Satish Samanta Halt railway station is located nearby.

== Education ==
Mahishadal Raj College at Garh Kamalpur was established in 1946. In addition to courses in arts, science and commerce, it offers post-graduate courses in Bengali and chemistry.

== Healthcare ==
Basulia Rural Hospital, the main medical facility in Mahishadal CD block, is located nearby.
