= Mahishadal (community development block) =

- Community development block
- Coordinates: 22.183333°N 87.983333°E
- Country: India
- State: West Bengal
- District: Purba Medinipur

Government
  - Type: Community development block

Area
  - Total: 146.48 km^{2} (56.56 sq mi)
- Elevation: 6 m (20 ft)

Population (2011)
  - Total: 206,277
  - Density: 1,408.2/km^{2} (3,647.3/sq mi)

Languages
  - Official: Bengali, English
- Time zone: UTC+5:30 (IST)
- PIN: 721628 (Rangibasan); 721654 (Lakshya)
- Area code: 03228
- ISO 3166 code: IN-WB
- Vehicle registration: WB-29, WB-30
- Literacy: 86.21%
- Lok Sabha constituency: Tamluk
- Vidhan Sabha constituency: Mahisadal
- Website: purbamedinipur.gov.in

Mahishadal is a community development block that forms an administrative division in Haldia subdivision of Purba Medinipur district in the Indian state of West Bengal.

== Geography ==
Purba Medinipur district is part of the lower Indo-Gangetic Plain and Eastern coastal plains. Topographically, the district can be divided into two parts – (a) almost entirely flat plains on the west, east and north, (b) the coastal plains on the south. The vast expanse of land is formed of alluvium and is composed of younger and coastal alluvial. The elevation of the district is within 10 metres above mean sea level. The district has a long coastline of 65.5 km along its southern and south eastern boundary. Five coastal CD Blocks, namely, Khejuri II, Contai II (Deshapran), Contai I, Ramnagar I and II, are occasionally affected by cyclones and tornadoes. Tidal floods are quite regular in these five CD Blocks. Normally floods occur in 21 of the 25 CD Blocks in the district. The major rivers are Haldi, Rupnarayan, Rasulpur, Bagui and Keleghai, flowing in north to south or south-east direction. River water is an important source of irrigation. The district has a low 899 hectare forest cover, which is 0.02% of its geographical area.

Mahishadal is located at 22°11′00″N 87°59′00″E.

Mahishadal CD Block is bounded by Shyampur I CD Block, in Howrah district, across the Rupnarayan in the north, Sutahata CD Block in the east, Haldia, Nandigram II and Chandipur CD Blocks in the south and Nandakumar CD Blocks in the west.

It is located 16 km from Tamluk, the district headquarters.

Mahishadal CD Block has an area of 146.48 km^{2}. It has 1 panchayat samity, 11 gram panchayats, 154 gram sansads (village councils), 75 mouzas and 73 inhabited villages. Mahishadal police station serves this block. Headquarters of this CD Block is at Rangibasan.

Gram panchayats of Mahishadal block/ panchayat samiti are: Amritberia, Betkundu, Garhkamalpur, Itamogra I, Itamogra II, Kismat-Naikundi, Lakshya I, Lakshya II, Natshal I, Natshal II and Satish Samanta.

== Demographics ==
=== Population ===
As per 2011 Census of India Mahishadal CD Block had a total population of 206,277, of which 199,613 were rural and 6,664 were urban. There were 106,391 (52%) males and 99,886 (48%) females. Population below 6 years was 23,598. Scheduled Castes numbered 23,201 (11.25%) and Scheduled Tribes numbered 193 (0.09%).

As per 2001 census, Mahishadal block had a total population of 182,245, out of which 93,470 were males and 88,775 were females. Mahishadal block registered a population growth of 14.89 per cent during the 1991-2001 decade. Decadal growth for the combined Midnapore district was 14.87 per cent. Decadal growth in West Bengal was 17.84 per cent.

Census Town in Mahishadal CD Block (2011 census figure in brackets: Garh Kamalpur (6,664).

Large villages (with 4,000+ population) in Mahishadal CD Block (2011 census figures in brackets): Gopalpur (8,294), Basulya (4,599), Itamagra (4,032), Rajarampur (4,078), Keshabpur Jalpai (8,955), Kanchanpur (5,597), Chanpi (5,237), Kalika Kundu (6,421), Rambagh (4,208), Purba Srirampur (5,024), Natshal (11,331), Laksya (8,247), Betkundu (4,935) and Mayachar or Bardyabiri Char (4,361).

Other villages in Mahishadal CD Block (2011 census figures in brackets): Rangibasan (2,570), Kismatnai Kundi (2,686) and Amritberya (3,958).

=== Literacy ===
As per 2011 census the total number of literates in Mahisadal CD Block was 157,494 (86.21% of the population over 6 years) out of which 86,027 (55%) were males and 71,467 (45%) were females.

As per 2011 census, literacy in Purba Medinipur district was 87.02%. Purba Medinipur had the highest literacy amongst all the districts of West Bengal in 2011. Literacy in West Bengal was 77.08% in 2011. Literacy in India in 2011 was 74.04%.

See also – List of West Bengal districts ranked by literacy rate

Literacy in CD blocks of
Purba Medinipur district
Tamluk subdivision
Tamluk – 87.06%
Sahid Matangini – 86.99%
Panskura I – 83.65%
Panskura II – 84.93%
Nandakumar – 85.56%
Chandipur – 87.81%
Moyna – 86.33%
Haldia subdivision
Mahishadal – 86.21%
Nandigram I – 84.89%
Nandigram II – 89.16%
Sutahata – 85.42%
Haldia – 85.96%
Contai subdivision
Contai I – 89.32%
Contai II – 88.33%
Contai III – 89.88%
Khejuri I – 88.90%
Khejuri II – 85.37%
Ramnagar I – 87.84%
Ramnagar II – 89.38%
Bhagabanpur II – 90.98%
Egra subdivision
Bhagabanpur I – 88.13%
Egra I – 82.83%
Egra II – 86.47%
Patashpur I – 86.58%
Patashpur II – 86.50%
2011 Census: CD Block Wise

Primary Census Abstract Data

=== Language and religion ===
Religion in Mahishadal CD block (2011)
Hinduism	79.96%
Islam	19.68%
Other or not stated	0.36%

In 2011 census Hindus numbered 164,943 and formed 79.96% of the population in Mahishadal CD Block. Muslims numbered 40,596 and formed 19.68% of the population. Others numbered 738 and formed 0.36% of the population. In 2001, Hindus made up 81.51% and Muslims 18.13% of the population respectively.

Bengali is the predominant language, spoken by 99.89% of the population.

== Rural poverty ==
The District Human Development Report for Purba Medinipur has provided a CD Block-wise data table for Modified Human Poverty Index of the district. Mahishadal CD Block registered 26.35 on the MHPI scale. The CD Block-wise mean MHPI was estimated at 24.78. Eleven out of twentyfive CD Blocks were found to be severely deprived in respect of grand CD Block average value of MHPI (CD Blocks with lower amount of poverty are better): All the CD Blocks of Haldia and Contai subdivisions appeared backward, except Ramnagar I & II, of all the blocks of Egra subdivision only Bhagabanpur I appeared backward and in Tamluk subdivision none appeared backward.

== Economy ==
=== Livelihood ===
In Mahishadal CD Block in 2011, total workers formed 35.88% of the total population and amongst the class of total workers, cultivators formed 11.27%, agricultural labourers 34.96%, household industry workers 5.04% and other workers 49.00%.

=== Infrastructure ===
There are 73 inhabited villages in Mahishadal CD block. All 73 villages (100%) have power supply. 72 villages (98.63%) have drinking water supply. 27 villages (36.99%) have post offices. 62 villages (84.93%) have telephones (including landlines, public call offices and mobile phones). 29 villages (39.73%) have a pucca (paved) approach road and 34 villages (46.58%) have transport communication (includes bus service, rail facility and navigable waterways). 14 villages (19.18%) have agricultural credit societies. 17 villages (23.29%) have banks.

In 2007-08, around 40% of rural households in the district had electricity.

In 2013-14, there were 38 fertiliser depots, 8 seed stores and 32 fair price shops in the CD Block.

=== Agriculture ===
Persons engaged in agriculture
in Mahishadal CD Block
1. Bargadars (6.91%)
2. Patta holders (13.1%)
3. Small farmers (2.52%)
4. Marginal farmers (33.8%)
5. Agricultural labourers (43.7%)

According to the District Human Development Report of Purba Medinipur: The agricultural sector is the lifeline of a predominantly rural economy. It is largely dependent on the Low Capacity Deep Tubewells (around 50%) or High Capacity Deep Tubewells (around 27%) for irrigation, as the district does not have a good network of canals, compared to some of the neighbouring districts. In many cases the canals are drainage canals which get the backflow of river water at times of high tide or the rainy season. The average size of land holding in Purba Medinipur, in 2005-06, was 0.73 hectares against 1.01 hectares in West Bengal.

In 2013-14, the total area irrigated in Mahisadal CD Block was 7,060 hectares, out of which 500 hectares were irrigated by tank water, 55 hectares by shallow tube wells, 375 hectares by river lift irrigation and .6,130 hectares by other means.

Although the Bargadari Act of 1950 recognised the rights of bargadars to a higher share of crops from the land that they tilled, it was not implemented fully. Large tracts, beyond the prescribed limit of land ceiling, remained with the rich landlords. From 1977 onwards major land reforms took place in West Bengal. Land in excess of land ceiling was acquired and distributed amongst the peasants. Following land reforms land ownership pattern has undergone transformation. In 2013-14, persons engaged in agriculture in Mahishadal CD Block could be classified as follows: bargadars 6.91%, patta (document) holders 13.10%, small farmers (possessing land between 1 and 2 hectares) 2.52%, marginal farmers (possessing land up to 1 hectare) 33.75% and agricultural labourers 43.71%.

In 2013-14, Mahishadal CD Block produced 12,670 tonnes of Aman paddy, the main winter crop, from 9,894 hectares, 23,856 tonnes of Boro paddy, the spring crop, from 6,356 hectares, 307 tonnes of Aus paddy, the summer crop, from 150 hectares, 27 tonnes of jute from 2 hectares and 518 tonnes of potatoes from 19 hectares. It also produced pulses and oil seeds.

Betelvine is a major source of livelihood in Purba Medinipur district, particularly in Tamluk and Contai subdivisions. Betelvine production in 2008-09 was the highest amongst all the districts and was around a third of the total state production. In 2008-09, Purba Mednipur produced 2,789 tonnes of cashew nuts from 3,340 hectares of land.

Concentration of Handicraft Activities in CD Blocks
- Horn Craft - Kolaghat
- Pata Chitra - Chandipur, Nandakumar
- Sea Shell – Ramnagar I & II
- Mat & Mat Diversified Products – Ramnagar I, Egra I & II, Patashpur I
- Brass & Bell Metal – Ramnagar I, Mahishadal, Patashpur II, Egra I
- Diversified Jute Products – Ramnagar II, Nandakumar, Kolaghat, Shahid Matangini
- Cane & Bamboo Products - Chandipur, Nandakumar, Kolaghat, Shahid Matangini
- Sola Craft - Tamluk, Kolaghat
- Pottery/Terracotta - Panskura, Tamluk, Sahid Matangini, Nandakumar
- Wood Craft - Tamluk
- Zari work - Sutahta, Mahishadal, Haldia, Nandakumar

Source: District Human Development Report, Purba Medinipur, Page 97

=== Pisciculture ===
Purba Medinipur's net district domestic product derives one fifth of its earnings from fisheries, the highest amongst all the districts of West Bengal. The net area available for effective pisciculture in Mahishadal CD Block in 2013-14 was 870.00 hectares. 4,458 persons were engaged in the profession and approximate annual production was 33,147 quintals.

=== Banking ===
In 2013-14, Mahishadal CD Block had offices of 3 commercial banks and 3 gramin banks.

=== Backward Regions Grant Fund ===
Medinipur East district is listed as a backward region and receives financial support from the Backward Regions Grant Fund. The fund, created by the Government of India, is designed to redress regional imbalances in development. As of 2012, 272 districts across the country were listed under this scheme. The list includes 11 districts of West Bengal.

== Transport ==
Mahishadal railway station and Satish Samanta Halt railway station is situated on the Panskura-Haldia line. The line was constructed in 1968 and was electrified in 1974-76.

NH 116, from Kolaghat to Haldia, passes through this block. Haldia to Mecheda state highway also passes through the block.

== Tourism ==
Mahishadal and Geonkhali are tourist destinations.

== Education ==
In 2013-14, Mahishadal CD Block had 128 primary schools with 9,625 students, 8 middle schools with 463 students, 13 high schools with 9,654 students, 17 higher secondary schools with 16,670 students and a private school with nearly 1500 students which provides schooling from nursery to higher secondary (class 12) . Mahishadal CD Block had 2 general colleges with 4,923 students and 304 institutions for special and non-formal education with 11,196 students.

As per the 2011 census, in Mahishadal CD block, amongst the 73 inhabited villages, 2 villages did not have a school, 49 villages had two or more primary schools, 38 villages had at least 1 primary and 1 middle school and 24 villages had at least 1 middle and 1 secondary school.

Mahishadal Raj College at Mahishadal was established in 1946. In addition to courses in arts, science and commerce, it offers post-graduate courses in Bengali and chemistry.

Mahishadal Girls College at Mahishadal was established in 1969. It offers courses in arts and science.

== Healthcare ==
In 2014, Mahishadal CD Block had 1 block primary health centre, 1 primary health centre, and 3 private nursing homes with total 80 beds and 8 doctors (excluding private bodies). It had 30 family welfare sub centres. 4,331 patients were treated indoor and 109,019 patients were treated outdoor in the hospitals, health centres and subcentres of the CD Block.

Basulia Rural Hospital at Basulia (with 30 beds) is the main medical facility in Mahishadal CD block. There are primary health centres at Natsal, PO Geonkhali (with 10 beds) and Rajarampur, PO Geonkhali (with ? beds).
