= Haldia subdivision =

- Subdivision
- Interactive map of Haldia subdivision
- Coordinates: 22.03°N 88.06°E
- Country: India
- State: West Bengal
- District: Purba Medinipur
- Headquarters: Haldia

Area
  - Total: 683.94 km^{2} (264.07 sq mi)

Population
  - Total: 959,953
  - Density: 1,403.6/km^{2} (3,635.2/sq mi)

Languages
  - Official: Bengali, English
- Time zone: UTC+5:30 (IST)
- ISO 3166 code: IN-WB
- Vehicle registration: WB 29 & WB 30
- Website: wb.gov.in

Haldia subdivision is a subdivision of the Purba Medinipur district in the state of West Bengal, India.

== Subdivisions ==
Purba Medinipur district is divided into the following administrative subdivisions:

Subdivision	Headquarters	Area km^{2}	Population (2011)	Rural population % (2001)	Urban population % (2001)
Tamluk	Tamluk	1084.30	1,791,695	94.08	5.92
Haldia	Haldia	683.94	959,934	79.19	20.81
Egra	Egra	940.96	958,939	96.96	3.04
Contai	Contai	1251.21	1,385,307	93.55	6.45
Purba Medinipur district	Tamluk	4,713.00	5,095,875	91.71	8.29

== Administrative units ==
Cities and towns in Haldia subdivision of Purba Medinipur district
M: municipal city/ town, CT: census town, R: rural/ urban centre, S: port
Owing to space constraints in the small map, the actual locations in a larger map may vary slightly

Haldia subdivision has 6 police stations, 5 community development blocks, 5 panchayat samitis, 38 gram panchayats, 320 mouzas, 312 (+ 1 partly) inhabited villages, 1 municipality and 4 census towns. The municipality is: Haldia. The census towns are: Garh Kamalpur, Nandigram, Ashadtalya and Barda. The subdivision has its headquarters at Haldia.

== Area ==
Haldia subdivision has an area of 683.94 km^{2}, population in 2011 of 959,934 and density of population of 1,404 per km^{2}. 18.84% of the population of the district resides in this subdivision.

== Police stations ==
Police stations in Haldia subdivision have the following features and jurisdiction:

Police Station	Area covered km^{2} *	Inter-state border	Municipal town	CD block
Mahishadal	135	-	-	Mahishadal
Nandigram	251.25	-	-	Nandigram I, Nandigram II
Sutahata	125	-	-	Sutahata
Durgachak	44.21	-	-	Haldia
Haldia	98	-	Haldia (part)	-
Bhabanipur	115	-	Hadia (part)	-

*The data for area is as per the website of Purba Medinipur Police, but it appears that it has not been updated for a long time.

== Blocks ==
Community development blocks in Haldia subdivision are:

CD Block	Headquarters	Area km^{2}	Population (2011)	SC %	ST %	Literacy rate %	Census towns
Mahishadal	Rangibasan	146.48	206,277	11.25	0.09	86.21	1
Nandigram I	Nandigram	181.84	207,835	18.58	0.07	85.89	1
Nandigram II	Reyepara	105.74	123,219	12.89	0.16	89.19	1
Sutahata	Sutahata	79.54	123,784	30.56	0.04	85.42	1
Haldia	Haldia	65.44	97,992	7.63	0.29	85.96	-

== Gram Panchayats ==
The subdivision contains 38 gram panchayats under 5 community development blocks:

- Mahishadal block: Amritaberia, Itamogra–I, Laksha–I, Natshal–I, Betkundu, Itamogra–II, Laksha–II, Satish Samanta, Garh Kamalpur, Kismat Naikundi and Natshal–II.
- Nandigram I block: Daudpur, Kalicharanpur, Nandigram, Bhakutia, Gokulnagar, Kendumari Jalpai, Samsabad, Haripur, Mahammadpur and Sona Chura.
- Nandigram II block: Amdabad–I, Birulia, Boyal–II, Khodambari–II, Amdabad–II, Boyal–I and Khodambari–I.
- Sutahata block: Ashadtalya, Guaberia, Joynagar, Chaitanyapur, Horkhali and Kukrahati.
- Haldia block: Baruttarhingli, Deulpota, Chakdwipa and Devog.

== Haldia port ==
Haldia Dock Complex is an all-weather riverine port, 60 km from the pilotage station, with an annual capacity of 41.71 million tonnes. It comprises three riverine oil jetties, fourteen berths inside an impounded dock and two riverine barge jetties. It was commissioned in 1977.

== Industry ==
=== Haldia oil refinery ===
Haldia oil refinery is one of the ten refineries of the Indian Oil Corporation. It was commissioned in 1975.

=== Haldia urban industrial complex ===
Haldia petro-chemical complex is one of the largest in India. It is a major industry which created jobs directly and indirectly in and around Haldia. Haldia Petrochemicals is the lead company. Amongst the other companies operating in the Haldia urban industrial complex are: Exide, Adani Wilmar, Haldia Energy Power Station, Shaw Wallace, Emami, Ruchi Soya, Electrosteel Castings, Tata Chemicals, Hindustan Lever and MCPI Private Limited.

== Education ==
With a literacy rate of 87.66% Purba Medinipur district ranked first amongst all districts of West Bengal in literacy as per the provisional figures of the census of India 2011. Within Purba Medinipur district, Tamluk subdivision had a literacy rate of 85.98%, Haldia subdivision 86.67%, Egra subdivision 86.18% and Contai subdivision 89.19%. All CD Blocks and municipalities in the district had literacy levels above 80%.

Given in the table below (data in numbers) is a comprehensive picture of the education scenario in Purba Medinipur district for the year 2013-14.

Subdivision	Primary school		Middle school		High school		Higher secondary school		General college, univ		Technical / professional instt		Non-formal education	
Subdivision	Institution	Student	Institution	Student	Institution	Student	Institution	Student	Institution	Student	Institution	Student	Institution	Student
Tamluk	1,084	84,258	78	5,789	77	43,408	144	171,516	6	12,728	17	2,747	2,704	112,411
Haldia	557	43,173	40	5,082	54	36,767	77	83,659	5	9,792	16	6,256	1,359	59,879
Egra	629	41,418	76	11,537	49	32,167	74	90,730	3	9,498	2	154	1,595	62,200
Contai	983	50,945	99	10,557	81	46,690	102	120,128	5	12,223	10	1,602	2,316	90,552
Purba Medinipur district	3,253	219,794	293	32,965	261	159,032	397	466,093	19	44,241	45	10,759	7,974	375,042

Note: Primary schools include junior basic schools; middle schools, high schools and higher secondary schools include madrasahs; technical schools include junior technical schools, junior government polytechnics, industrial technical institutes, industrial training centres, nursing training institutes etc.; technical and professional colleges include engineering colleges, polytechnics, medical colleges, para-medical institutes, management colleges, teachers training and nursing training colleges, law colleges, art colleges, music colleges etc. Special and non-formal education centres include sishu siksha kendras, madhyamik siksha kendras, centres of Rabindra mukta vidyalaya, recognised Sanskrit tols, institutions for the blind and other handicapped persons, Anganwadi centres, reformatory schools etc.

The following institutions are located in Haldia subdivision:

- Mahishadal Raj College at Mahishadal was established in 1946. In addition to courses in arts, science and commerce, it offers post-graduate courses in Bengali and chemistry.
- Mahishadal Girls College at Mahishadal was established in 1969. It offers courses in arts and science.
- Sitananda College at Nandigram was established in 1960. It offers courses in arts and science.
- Haldia Government College at Haldia was established in 1988. In addition to regular courses in arts and science, it offers a post-graduate course in Travel and Tourism Management.
- Haldia Law College at Haldia was established in 2002. It offers (1) Five-year integrated B.A.-Ll.B. (Hons), (2) Three-year Ll.B. and (3) Two-year Ll.M. courses.
- Haldia Institute of Technology at Haldia is a private-initiated engineering college offering degree courses. It was established in 1995.
- Vivekananda Mission Mahavidyalaya at PO Chaitanyapur, Haldia was established in 1968. It offers courses in arts, science and commerce.
- ICARE Institute of Medical Sciences and Research at Banbishnupur, PO Balughata, offers MBBS courses. It has been facing some administrative problems.

== Healthcare ==
The table below (all data in numbers) presents an overview of the medical facilities available and patients treated in the hospitals, health centres and sub-centres in 2014 in Purba Medinipur district.

Subdivision	Health & Family Welfare Deptt, WB				Other State Govt Deptts	Local bodies	Central Govt Deptts / PSUs	NGO / Private Nursing Homes	Total	Total Number of Beds	Total Number of Doctors	Indoor Patients	Outdoor Patients
Subdivision	Hospitals	Rural Hospitals	Block Primary Health Centres	Primary Health Centres	Other State Govt Deptts	Local bodies	Central Govt Deptts / PSUs	NGO / Private Nursing Homes	Total	Total Number of Beds	Total Number of Doctors	Indoor Patients	Outdoor Patients
Tamluk	1	-	7	14	-	-	-	70	92	1,506	96	61,84	1,251,099
Haldia	1	2	3	10	-	-	-	19	35	803	67	27,586	757,876
Egra	1	1	4	11	-	-	-	21	38	489	42	23,699	419,829
Contai	2	-	8	16	-	-	-	22	48	688	88	59,882	890,607
Purba Medinipur district	5	3	22	51	-	-	-	132	213	3,486	293	172,251	3,319,411

Medical facilities available in Haldia subdivision are as follows:

Hospitals: (Name, location, beds)
Haldia Subdivision Hospital, Khanjanchak, Haldia, 250 beds
Haldia Port Trust Hospital, Haldia, 47 beds
Dr. B.C. Roy Hospital, Banbishnupur, Balughata, Haldia, 700 beds
Rural Hospitals: (Name, CD block, location, beds)
Nandigram Rural Hospital, Nandigram I CD block, Nandigram, 30 beds
Reapara Rural Hospital, Nandigram II CD block, Reapara, 30 beds
Basulia Rural Hospital, Mahishadal CD block, Basulia, 30 beds
Block Primary Health Centre: (Name, block, location, beds)
Amlat BPHC, Sutahata CD block, Sutahata, 10 beds
Bargashipur BPHC, Haldia CD block, 10 beds, Barghasipur, 10 beds
Primary Health Centres: (CD block-wise)(CD block, PHC location, beds)
Nandigram I CD block: Mohammadpur, PO Nilpur (10), Mahespur, PO Parulbari (6)
Nandigram II CD block: Boyal (6), Amdabad (10)
Sutahata CD block: Joynagar, PO Dorojoynagar (6), Begunberia, PO Golapchak (10)
Haldia CD block: Debhog (10), Barsundra, PO Iswardahajalpai (2)
Mahishadal CD block: Natsal, PO Geonkhali (10), Rajarampur, PO Geonkhali (?)

== Electoral constituencies ==
Lok Sabha (parliamentary) and Vidhan Sabha (state assembly) constituencies in Purba Medinipur district were as follows:

Lok Sabha constituency	Vidhan Sabha constituency	Reservation	CD Block and/or Gram panchayats
Ghatal	Panskura Paschim	None	Panskura CD Block
	Other assembly segments in Paschim Medinipur district		
Tamluk	Tamluk	None	Tamluk municipality, Bishnubarh II, Pipulberia I, Pipulberia II and Uttar Sonamui gram panchayats of Tamluk CD Block, and Sahid Matangini CD Block
	Panskura Purba	None	Kolaghat CD Block
	Moyna	None	Moyna CD Block, Anantapur I, Anantapur II, Nilkunthia, Sreerampur I and Sreerampur II GPs of Tamluk CD Block
	Nandakumar	None	Nandakumar CD Block and Bishnubarh I, Padumpur I and Padumpur II GPs of Tamluk CD Block
	Mahisadal	None	Mahishadal and Haldia CD Blocks
	Haldia	SC	Haldia municipality and Sutahata CD Block
	Nandigram	None	Nandigram I and Nandigram II CD Blocks
Kanthi	Chandipur	None	Chandipur CD Block and Benodia, Bivisanpur, Gurgram, Kakra, Mahammadpur I and Mahammadpur II GPs of Bhagabanpur I CD Block
	Paashpur	None	Patashpur I CD Block; Khargram, Panchet, Pataspur, South Khanda and Sreerampur gram panchayats of Patashpur II CD Block
	Kanthi Uttar	None	Deshapran CD Block, Brajachauli, Debendra, Kanaidighi, Kumirda, Lauda and Marishda GPs of Contai III CD Block and Bathuari GP of Egra II CD Block
	Bhagabanpur	None	Bhagabanpur, Kajlagarh, Kotbarh and Shimulia GPs of Bhagabanpur I CD Block, Arjunnagar, Basudevberia, Baroj, Itaberia, Jukhia, Mugberia and Radhapur GPs of Bhagabanpur II CD Block, and Argoyal and Mathura GPs of Patashpur II CD Block
	Khejuri	SC	Khejuri I and Khejuri II CD Blocks, and Garbari I and Garbari II GPs of Bhagabanpur II CD Block
	Kanthi Dakshin	None	Contai municipality, Contai I CD Block, and Durmuth and Kusumpur GPs of Contai III CD Block
	Ramnagar	None	Ramnagar I and Ramnagar II CD Blocks
