= Tamil Nadu PCPIR =

The Tamil Nadu PCPIR (TNPCPIR) is a planned Petroleum, Chemicals and Petrochemicals Investment Region (PCPIR) in the Indian state of Tamil Nadu. It is to be developed in an area of 318 km^{2} along the coastal Cuddalore — Nagapattinam stretch. A special purpose vehicle (SPV) named TNPCPIR Company Ltd., would be floated for the managing the project and a TNPCPIR Development Authority would be formed to develop the area. The region is planned by the Tamil Nadu Industrial Development Corporation (TIDCO)

== Nagarjuna Petroleum Refinery ==
=== Phase I ===
Nagarjuna Oil Corp Ltd (NOCL) is setting up a six million tonnes per year crude throughput capacity petroleum refinery project costing Rs 4,790 crore. The oil refinery project has attained financial closure recently and is expected to go onstream in 2011.

=== Phase II ===
The Nagarjuna refinery is to be expanded to 15 million tonne per year by 2013-14.
