= Nandigram II =

- Community development block
- Interactive map of Nandigram II
- Coordinates: 22.0469817°N 87.9157734°E
- Country: India
- State: West Bengal
- District: Purba Medinipur

Government
  - Type: Community development block

Area
  - Total: 105.74 km^{2} (40.83 sq mi)
- Elevation: 5 m (16 ft)

Population (2011)
  - Total: 123,219
  - Density: 1,165.3/km^{2} (3,018.1/sq mi)

Languages
  - Official: Bengali, English
- Time zone: UTC+5:30 (IST)
- PIN: 721650 (Riapara)
- Area code: 03224
- ISO 3166 code: IN-WB
- Vehicle registration: WB-29, WB-30, WB-31, WB-32, WB-33
- Literacy: 89.16%
- Lok Sabha constituency: Tamluk
- Vidhan Sabha constituency: Nandigram
- Website: purbamedinipur.gov.in

Nandigram II is a community development block that forms an administrative division in Haldia subdivision of Purba Medinipur district in the Indian state of West Bengal.

== History ==
=== Historical background ===
The people of Nandigram, along with others in Medinipur district, were at the forefront of many political movements in the past. They took part in the boycott of British goods in 1901, the Khilafat and non-cooperation movements in 1921, in opposing the chowkidari tax, the Salt Satyagraha in 1930 and the Tebhaga movement in 1946. The Tebhaga movement was spearheaded by the CPI, which had developed a base in this district prior to its bifurcation.

=== Nandigram movement ===
Haldia Development Authority issued a notification for land acquisition for a chemical hub, covering both Nandigram I and Nandigram II CD Blocks, on 28 December 2006. According to one estimate some 95,000 people were going to be displaced in both the blocks. However, Nandigram I CD Block was the main area affected by land acquisition. 18,123 acres were going to be acquired there affecting 38 villages. Protests against land acquisition snowballed into a major movement, led by Bhumi Uchhed Pratirodh Committee and large scale repression. The location was later shifted to Nayachar and the proposal was finally scrapped.

== Geography ==
Purba Medinipur district is part of the lower Indo-Gangetic Plain and Eastern coastal plains. Topographically, the district can be divided into two parts – (a) almost entirely flat plains on the west, east and north, (b) the coastal plains on the south. The vast expanse of land is formed of alluvium and is composed of younger and coastal alluvial. The elevation of the district is within 10 metres above mean sea level. The district has a long coastline of 65.5 km along its southern and south eastern boundary. Five coastal CD Blocks, namely, Khejuri II, Contai II (Deshapran), Contai I, Ramnagar I and II, are occasionally affected by cyclones and tornadoes. Tidal floods are quite regular in these five CD Blocks. Normally floods occur in 21 of the 25 CD Blocks in the district. The major rivers are Haldi, Rupnarayan, Rasulpur, Bagui and Keleghai, flowing in north to south or south-east direction. River water is an important source of irrigation. The district has a low 899 hectare forest cover, which is 0.02% of its geographical area.

Khodambari, a constituent panchayat of Nandigram II block, is located at 22°02′49″N 87°54′57″E.

Nandigram II CD Block is bounded by Mahishadal and Haldia CD Blocks, across the Haldi in the north, Nandigram I CD Block in the east, Khejuri I CD Block in the south and Chandipur and Bhagabanpur II CD Blocks in the west.

It is located 33 km from Tamluk, the district headquarters.

Nandigram II CD Block has an area of 105.74 km^{2}. It has 1 panchayat samity, 7 gram panchayats, 91 gram sansads (village councils), 41 mouzas and 40 inhabited villages. Nandigram police station serves this block. Headquarters of this CD Block is at Reyepara.

Gram panchayats of Nandigram II block/ panchayat samiti are: Amdabad I, Amdabad II, Birulia, Boyal I, Boyal II, Khodambari I and Khodambari II.

== Demographics ==
=== Population ===
As per the 2011 Census of India Nandigram II CD Block had a total population of 123,219, of which 117,945 were rural and 5,274 were urban. There were 63,323 (51%) males and 59,896 (49%) females. Population below 6 years was 15,105. Scheduled Castes numbered 15,884 (12.89%) and Scheduled Tribes numbered 196 (0.16%).

As per the 2001 census, Nandigram II block had a total population of 104,620, out of which 53,239 were males and 51,381 were females. Nandigram II block registered a population growth of 9.62 per cent during the 1991-2001 decade. Decadal growth for the combined Midnapore district was 14.87 per cent. Decadal growth in West Bengal was 17.84 per cent.

Census Town in Nandigram II CD Block (2011 census figure in brackets): Ashadtalya (5,274).

Large villages (with 4,000+ population) in Nandigram II CD Block (2011 census figures in brackets): Bayal (5,543), Amratalya (5,287), Khodambari (7,359), Hanu Bhunya (4,768), Ghol Pukurya (7,053), Birulia (6,744), Subdi (5,615), Amda Bad (10,833), Bheturya (4,695) and Kamalpur (7,815).

=== Literacy ===
As per 2011 census the total number of literates in Nandigram II CD Block was 96,395 (89.16% of the population over 6 years) out of which 51,751 (93.21%) were males and 44,644 (84.88%) were females.

As per 2011 census, literacy in Purba Medinipur district was 87.02%. Purba Medinipur had the highest literacy amongst all the districts of West Bengal in 2011.

See also – List of West Bengal districts ranked by literacy rate

Literacy in CD blocks of
Purba Medinipur district
Tamluk subdivision
Tamluk – 87.06%
Sahid Matangini – 86.99%
Panskura I – 83.65%
Panskura II – 84.93%
Nandakumar – 85.56%
Chandipur – 87.81%
Moyna – 86.33%
Haldia subdivision
Mahishadal – 86.21%
Nandigram I – 84.89%
Nandigram II – 89.16%
Sutahata – 85.42%
Haldia – 85.96%
Contai subdivision
Contai I – 89.32%
Contai II – 88.33%
Contai III – 89.88%
Khejuri I – 88.90%
Khejuri II – 85.37%
Ramnagar I – 87.84%
Ramnagar II – 89.38%
Bhagabanpur II – 90.98%
Egra subdivision
Bhagabanpur I – 88.13%
Egra I – 82.83%
Egra II – 86.47%
Patashpur I – 86.58%
Patashpur II – 86.50%
2011 Census: CD Block Wise

Primary Census Abstract Data

=== Language and religion ===
Religion in Nandigram II CD block (2011)
Hinduism	87.71%
Islam	12.13%
Other or not stated	0.16%

In 2011 census Hindus numbered 108,078 and formed 87.71% of the population in Nandigram II CD Block. Muslims numbered 1,940 and formed 12.13% of the population. Others numbered 201 and formed 0.16% of the population. In 2001, Hindus made up 89.28% and Muslims 10.64% of the population respectively.

Bengali is the predominant language, spoken by 99.94% of the population.

== Rural poverty ==
The District Human Development Report for Purba Medinipur has provided a CD Block-wise data table for Modified Human Poverty Index of the district. Nandigram II CD Block registered 30.41 on the MHPI scale. The CD Block-wise mean MHPI was estimated at 24.78. Eleven out of twentyfive CD Blocks were found to be severely deprived in respect of grand CD Block average value of MHPI (CD Blocks with lower amount of poverty are better): All the CD Blocks of Haldia and Contai subdivisions appeared backward, except Ramnagar I & II, of all the blocks of Egra subdivision only Bhagabanpur I appeared backward and in Tamluk subdivision none appeared backward.

== Economy ==
=== Livelihood ===
In Nandigram II CD Block in 2011, total workers formed 34.90% of the total population and amongst the class of total workers, cultivators formed 18.15%, agricultural labourers 50.33%, household industry workers 2.42% and other workers 29.10%.

=== Infrastructure ===
There are 40 inhabited villages in Nandigram II CD block. All 40 villages (100%) have power supply. 39 villages (97.5%) have drinking water supply. 20 villages (50%) have post offices. 34 villages (85%) have telephones (including landlines, public call offices and mobile phones). 11 villages (27.50%) have a pucca (paved) approach road and 12 villages (30%) have transport communication (includes bus service, rail facility and navigable waterways). 13 villages (32.50%) have agricultural credit societies. 6 villages (15%) have banks.

In 2007-08, around 40% of rural households in the district had electricity.

In 2013-14, there were 21 fertiliser depots, 2 seed stores and 21 fair price shops in the CD Block.

=== Agriculture ===
Persons engaged in agriculture
in Nandigram II CD Block
1. Bargadars (14.7%)
2. Patta holders (11.1%)
3. Small farmers (2.71%)
4. Marginal farmers (33.2%)
5. Agricultural labourers (38.3%)

According to the District Human Development Report of Purba Medinipur: The agricultural sector is the lifeline of a predominantly rural economy. It is largely dependent on the Low Capacity Deep Tubewells (around 50%) or High Capacity Deep Tubewells (around 27%) for irrigation, as the district does not have a good network of canals, compared to some of the neighbouring districts. In many cases the canals are drainage canals which get the backflow of river water at times of high tide or the rainy season. The average size of land holding in Purba Medinipur, in 2005-06, was 0.73 hectares against 1.01 hectares in West Bengal.

In 2013-14, the total area irrigated in Nandigram II CD Block was 2,836 hectares, out of which 735 hectares were irrigated by tank water, 1,500 hectares by shallow tube wells and 600 hectares by other means.

Although the Bargadari Act of 1950 recognised the rights of bargadars to a higher share of crops from the land that they tilled, it was not implemented fully. Large tracts, beyond the prescribed limit of land ceiling, remained with the rich landlords. From 1977 onwards major land reforms took place in West Bengal. Land in excess of land ceiling was acquired and distributed amongst the peasants. Following land reforms land ownership pattern has undergone transformation. In 2013-14, persons engaged in agriculture in Nandigram II CD Block could be classified as follows: bargadars 14.65%, patta (document) holders 11.14%, small farmers (possessing land between 1 and 2 hectares) 2.71%, marginal farmers (possessing land up to 1 hectare) 33.19% and agricultural labourers 38.32%.

In 2013-14, Nandigram II CD Block produced 11,449 tonnes of Aman paddy, the main winter crop, from 8,527 hectares, 5,451 tonnes of Boro paddy, the spring crop, from 1,470 hectares, 292 tonnes of Aus paddy, the summer crop, from 143 hectares and 4,112 tonnes of potatoes from 230 hectares. It also produced pulses and oil seeds.

Betelvine is a major source of livelihood in Purba Medinipur district, particularly in Tamluk and Contai subdivisions. Betelvine production in 2008-09 was the highest amongst all the districts and was around a third of the total state production. In 2008-09, Purba Mednipur produced 2,789 tonnes of cashew nuts from 3,340 hectares of land.

Concentration of Handicraft Activities in CD Blocks
- Horn Craft - Kolaghat
- Pata Chitra - Chandipur, Nandakumar
- Sea Shell – Ramnagar I & II
- Mat & Mat Diversified Products – Ramnagar I, Egra I & II, Patashpur I
- Brass & Bell Metal – Ramnagar I, Mahisadal, Patashpur II, Egra I
- Diversified Jute Products – Ramnagar II, Nandakumar, Kolaghat, Shahid Matangini
- Cane & Bamboo Products - Chandipur, Nandakumar, Kolaghat, Shahid Matangini
- Sola Craft - Tamluk, Kolaghat
- Pottery/Terracotta - Panskura, Tamluk, Sahid Matangini, Nandakumar
- Wood Craft - Tamluk
- Zari work- Sutahta, Mahisadal, Haldia, Nandakumar

Source: District Human Development Report, Purba Medinipur, Page 97

=== Pisciculture ===
Purba Medinipur's net district domestic product derives one fifth of its earnings from fisheries, the highest amongst all the districts of West Bengal. The nett area available for effective pisciculture in Nandigram II CD Block in 2013-14 was 600.00 hectares. 3,355 persons were engaged in the profession and approximate annual production was 22,860 quintals.

=== Banking ===
In 2013-14, Nandigram II CD Block had offices of 4 commercial banks and 1 gramin bank.

=== Backward Regions Grant Fund ===
Medinipur East district is listed as a backward region and receives financial support from the Backward Regions Grant Fund. The fund, created by the Government of India, is designed to redress regional imbalances in development. As of 2012, 272 districts across the country were listed under this scheme. The list includes 11 districts of West Bengal.

== Transport ==
Nandigram II CD Block has 1 ferry service. The nearest railway station is 14 km from the block headquarters.

== Education ==
In 2013-14, Nandigram II CD Block had 92 primary schools with 7,267 students, 7 middle schools with 2,163 students, 10 high schools with 5,197 students and 13 higher secondary schools with 11,631 students. Nandigram II CD Block had 2 technical/ professional institutes with 200 students and 203 institutions for special and non-formal education with 10,998 students.

As per the 2011 census, in Nandigram II CD block, amongst the 40 inhabited villages, 4 villages did not have a school, 28 villages had two or more primary schools, 19 villages had at least 1 primary and 1 middle school and 14 villages had at least 1 middle and 1 secondary school.

== Healthcare ==
In 2014, Nandigram II CD Block had 1 rural hospital and 2 primary health centres, with total 30 beds and 10 doctors (excluding private bodies). It had 19 family welfare sub centres. 3,599 patients were treated indoor and 69,988 patients were treated outdoor in the hospitals, health centres and subcentres of the CD Block.

Reapara Rural Hospital at Reapara (with 30 beds) is the main medical facility in Nandigram II CD block. There are primary health centres at Boyal (with 6 beds) and Amdabad (with 10 beds).
