= Barda, Purba Medinipur =

Barda
- Census Town
- Location in West Bengal, India Barda (India)
- Coordinates: 22.1491°N 88.0969°E
- Country: India
- State: West Bengal
- District: Purba Medinipur

Area
  - Total: 3.3186 km^{2} (1.2813 sq mi)

Population (2011)
  - Total: 5,155
  - Density: 1,553/km^{2} (4,023/sq mi)

Languages
  - Official: Bengali, English
- Time zone: UTC+5:30 (IST)
- Lok Sabha constituency: Tamluk
- Vidhan Sabha constituency: Haldia
- Website: purbamedinipur.gov.in

Barda is a census town in Sutahata CD block in Haldia subdivision of Purba Medinipur district in the state of West Bengal, India.

== Geography ==
Cities and towns in Haldia subdivision of Purba Medinipur district
M: municipal city/ town, CT: census town, R: rural/ urban centre, S: port
Owing to space constraints in the small map, the actual locations in a larger map may vary slightly

=== Location ===
Barda is located at 22.1491°N 88.0969°E.

=== Urbanisation ===
79.19% of the population of Haldia subdivision live in the rural areas. Only 20.81% of the population live in the urban areas, and that is the highest proportion of urban population amongst the four subdivisions in Purba Medinipur district.

Note: The map alongside presents some of the notable locations in the subdivision. All places marked in the map are linked in the larger full screen map.

== Demographics ==
As per 2011 Census of India Barda had a total population of 5,155 of which 2,617 (51%) were males and 2,538 (49%) were females. Population below 6 years was 556. The total number of literates in Barda was 4,103 (89.22% of the population over 6 years).

== Infrastructure ==
As per the District Census Handbook 2011, Barda covered an area of 3.3186 km^{2}. It had the facility of a railway station and bus services in the town. Amongst the civic amenities it had 500 domestic electric connections. Amongst the medical facilities it had were a hospital with 15 beds 1 km away and 11 medicine shops. Amongst the educational facilities it had were 4 primary schools. The nearest middle school and secondary school were at Kesabpur close by. The nearest senior secondary school was at Bajitpur close by. The nearest degree college was at Keshabpur.

== Transport ==
Barda is on the Haldia-Kurahati Road. Barda railway station is situated on the Panskura-Haldia line.

== Education ==
Vivekananda Mission Mahavidyalaya at PO Chaitanyapur, located nearby, was established in 1968. It offers courses in arts, science and commerce.
