= Sona Chura =

- Village
- Location in West Bengal, India Sona Chura (India)
- Coordinates: 21°54′7.6″N 87°57′52.9″E
- Country: India
- State: West Bengal
- District: Purba Medinipur
- Elevation: 7 m (23 ft)

Population (2011)
  - Total: 5,736

Languages
  - Official: Bengali, English
- Time zone: UTC+5:30 (IST)
- PIN: 721 646 (Tekhalibazar)
- Area code: 03224
- Vehicle registration: WB
- Website: wb.gov.in

Sona Chura is a village and a Gram panchayat in Nandigram I CD Block in Purba Medinipur district in the Indian state of West Bengal.

== History ==
=== Nandigram movement ===
Sona Chura was one of the six gram panchayats mentioned in the notification issued for land acquisition of a proposed chemical hub in 2006. Protests led by Bhumi Uchhed Pratirodh Committee snowballed into a major movement and repression followed. Amongst the other affected areas were: Bhangabera, Saudkhali, Maheshpur, Gokulnagar and Adhikaripara. The location of the proposed chemical hub was later shifted to Nayachar and the proposal was finally scrapped.

== Geography ==
Cities and towns in Haldia subdivision of Purba Medinipur district
M: municipal city/ town, CT: census town, R: rural/ urban centre, S: port
Owing to space constraints in the small map, the actual locations in a larger map may vary slightly

=== Location ===
Sona Chura is located at 21°54′7.6″N 87°57′52.9″E.

=== Martyrs Memorial ===
Nandigram Andolan Sahid Smarane is a 130 ft tower that stands as a memorial to those who lost their lives at Sona Chura in 2007. It was built by Bhumi Uchhed Pratirodh Committee in 2014. There are pictures of 21 people who died, 14 of them died on 14 March 2007 when police fired upon a procession headed for Nandigram from Sona Chura, 15 km away. Another ten people disappeared from Tekhali.

=== Bhangabera Bridge ===
The Bhangabera Bridge, across the Talpati canal, near Sona Chura (3.3 km away), is located at 21°53′29″N 87°58′15″E. Talpati is a drainage canal which allows river waters to come inwards at times of tides and floods and helps in irrigation. Talpati canal served as a ‘boundary’ between Nandigram I and Khejuri II CD Blocks. When the two CD Blocks were under control of two opposing forces – Khejuri under CPI (M) and Nandigram under Trinamool Congress, Bhangabera Bridge formed a sort of a check point with flags of the two political parties fluttering on either side.

=== Urbanisation ===
79.19% of the population of Haldia subdivision live in the rural areas. Only 20.81% of the population live in the urban areas, and that is the highest proportion of urban population amongst the four subdivisions in Purba Medinipur district.

Note: The map above presents some of the notable locations in the subdivision. All places marked in the map are linked in the larger full screen map.

== Demographics ==
As per the 2011 Census of India Sona Chura had a total population of 5,736. There were 2,974 (52%) males and 2,762 (48%) females. Population below six years was 736. The number of literates were 4,239 (84.78%) of the population above six years.
