= Kukrahati =

- Village
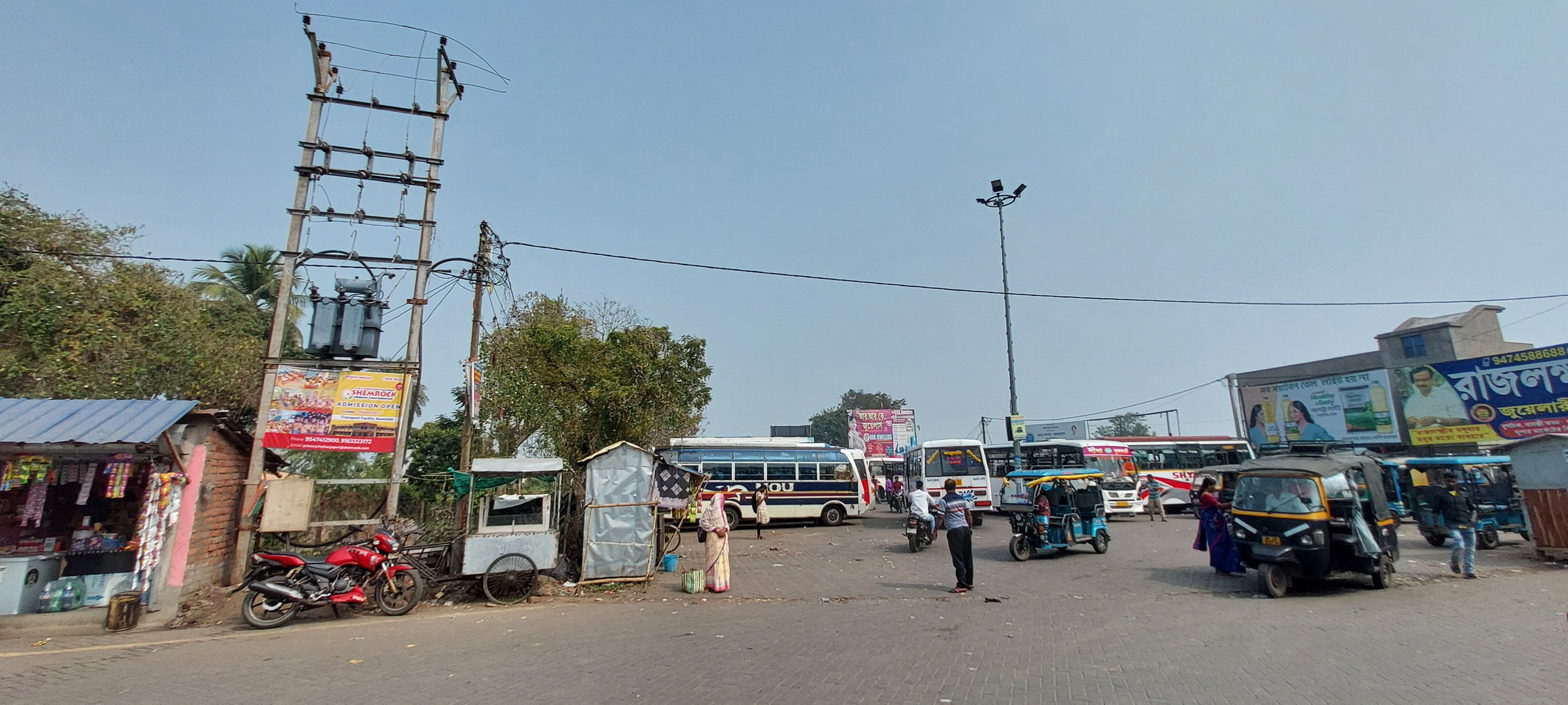
- Kukrahati bus stand

- Location in West Bengal, India Kukrahati (India)
- Coordinates: 22.1875°N 88.1182°E
- Country: India
- State: West Bengal
- District: Purba Medinipur
- Subdivision: Haldia subdivision
- CD Block: Sutahata

Languages
  - Official: Bengali, English
- Time zone: UTC+5:30 (IST)
- Website: purbamedinipur.gov.in

Kukrahati is a village in Sutahata CD block in Purba Medinipur district of the Indian state of West Bengal.

== Geography ==
Cities and towns in Haldia subdivision of Purba Medinipur district
M: municipal city/ town, CT: census town, R: rural/ urban centre, S: port
Owing to space constraints in the small map, the actual locations in a larger map may vary slightly

=== Location ===
It is located around 60 km from Kolkata, and stands on the bank of the Hooghly river, opposite Raichak in South 24 Parganas. It is the gateway to the port and industrial city of Haldia.

=== Urbanisation ===
79.19% of the population of Haldia subdivision live in the rural areas. Only 20.81% of the population live in the urban areas, and that is the highest proportion of urban population amongst the four subdivisions in Purba Medinipur district.

Note: The map alongside presents some of the notable locations in the subdivision. All places marked in the map are linked in the larger full screen map.

== Economy ==
=== Abandoned bridge proposal ===
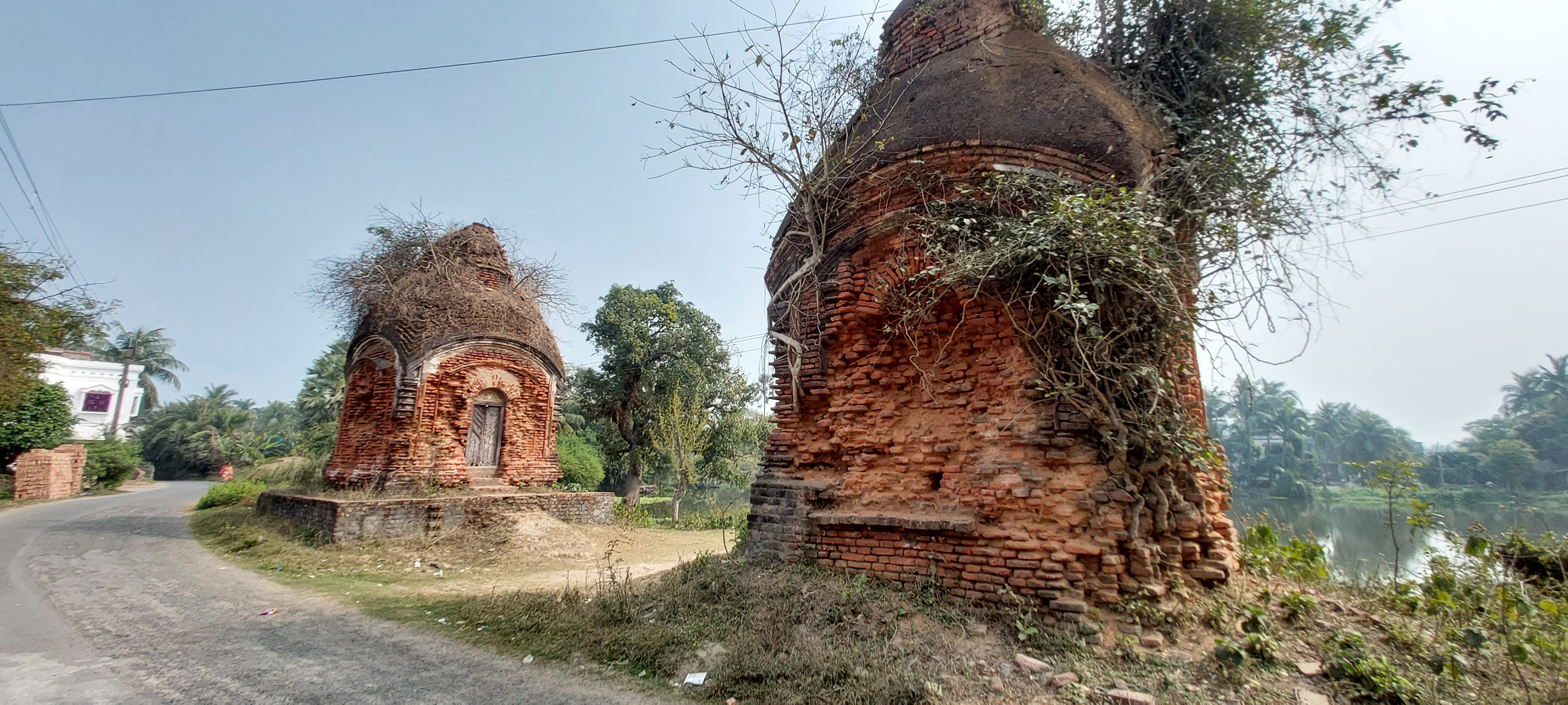
Kukrahati Jora Shiv Temple

There was a proposal to build a bridge across the Hooghly river from Kukrahati to Raichak. The four lane road bridge was expected to be complete by 2012. The construction of the Eastern Link Highway, linking Barasat with Raichak, which would have been 100 km long and 100 m wide and spread over 2,500 acres (10 km^{2}), was also on the anvil. The road would have ultimately terminated at Nandigram. The projects were to be implemented by New Kolkata International Development Private Ltd, a special purpose company that had been promoted by the Salim Group, the Universal Success Group and Unitech. The government was also agreed on acquiring 5,000 acres (20 km^{2}) for the Salim Group at Kukrahati to develop a township. The Kukrahati township was to come up on low and saline land close to the banks of the Hooghly river. The entire project and associated programmes were abandoned by the Left Front government after the Nandigram violence in 2007.

== Transport ==
- There are regular bus services between Esplanade to Raichak and between Kukrahati to Haldia.
- Regular EMU/MEMU train service also available between Diamond Harbour to Sealdah. There is also regular bus service available to Digha from Kukrahati. Approx 5.7 KM away from Kukrahati, Barda railway station, a Kolkata Suburban Railway station is located under South Eastern Railway zone, which is regular connected from Haldia, Howrah and Kharagpur
- There is a ferry service across the Hooghly between Raichak and Kukrahati. The ferry service is available every 30 minutes from 6-00 am on both sides to 8-00 pm at Kukrahati and 8-40 pm at Raichak. Another ferry service is available across the Hooghly between Diamond Harbour II CD Block and Kukrahati. The ferry service is available every 30 minutes from 5-45 am to 6-45 pm at Kukrahati and 6-30 am to 7-30 pm at Diamond Harbour.
