= Basulya Sutahata railway station =

Railway station in West Bengal, India

Basulya Sutahata

General information
- Location: Haldia–Mecheda road, Durbbabere, Sutahata, Purba Medinipur district, West Bengal; India
- Coordinates: 22°07′13″N 88°07′51″E
- System: Kolkata Suburban Railway
- Owner: Indian Railways
- Operator: South Eastern Railway zone
- Line: Panskura–Haldia branch line
- Platforms: 3
- Tracks: 3

Construction
- Structure type: Standard (on-ground station)

Other information
- Status: Functioning
- Station code: BYSA
- Division(s): Kharagpur

History
- Opened: 1968
- Electrified: 1974–76

Services
Preceding station	Kolkata Suburban Railway	Following station
Durgachak towards Haldia	South Eastern Line Panskura–Haldia line	Barda towards Howrah Junction
Route map
Location
- Location within West Bengal Location within India

Basulya Sutahata railway station is a railway station on the Panskura–Haldia branch line in South Eastern Railway zone of Indian Railways. The railway station is situated beside Haldia–Mecheda road at Durbbabere, Sutahata in Purba Medinipur district in the Indian state of West Bengal.

== History ==
The Howrah–Kharagpur line was opened in 1865 and Panskura-Durgachak line was opened in 1968, at a time when Haldia Port was being constructed. It was subsequently extended to Haldia. The Panskura–Haldia line including Basulya Sutahata railway station was electrified in 1974–76.
