= Sutahata (community development block) =

- Community development block
- Coordinates: 22.140°N 88.080°E
- Country: India
- State: West Bengal
- District: Purba Medinipur

Government
  - Type: Community development block

Area
  - Total: 79.54 km^{2} (30.71 sq mi)
- Elevation: 7 m (23 ft)

Population (2011)
  - Total: 123,784
  - Density: 1,556/km^{2} (4,031/sq mi)

Languages
  - Official: Bengali, English
- Time zone: UTC+5:30 (IST)
- PIN: 721635 (Sutahata); 721658 (Kukrahati)
- Area code: 03224
- ISO 3166 code: IN-WB
- Vehicle registration: WB-29, WB-30, WB-31, WB-32, WB-33
- Literacy: 85.42%
- Lok Sabha constituency: Tamluk
- Vidhan Sabha constituency: Haldia
- Website: purbamedinipur.gov.in

Sutahata is a community development block that forms an administrative division in Haldia subdivision of Purba Medinipur district in the Indian state of West Bengal. In earlier days this block was referred to as Sutahata I block, and Haldia block was referred to as Sutahata II block.

== History ==
Sutahata was initially a market place for the sale of handloom products.

== Geography ==
Purba Medinipur district is part of the lower Indo-Gangetic Plain and Eastern coastal plains. Topographically, the district can be divided into two parts – (a) almost entirely flat plains on the west, east and north, (b) the coastal plains on the south. The vast expanse of land is formed of alluvium and is composed of younger and coastal alluvial. The elevation of the district is within 10 metres above mean sea level. The district has a long coastline of 65.5 km along its southern and south eastern boundary. Five coastal CD Blocks, namely, Khejuri II, Contai II (Deshapran), Contai I, Ramnagar I and II, are occasionally affected by cyclones and tornadoes. Tidal floods are quite regular in these five CD Blocks. Normally floods occur in 21 of the 25 CD Blocks in the district. The major rivers are Haldi, Rupnarayan, Rasulpur, Bagui and Keleghai, flowing in north to south or south-east direction. River water is an important source of irrigation. The district has a low 899 hectare forest cover, which is 0.02% of its geographical area.

Sutahata is located at 22°08′24″N 88°04′48″E.

Sutahata CD Block is bounded by Diamond Harbour II CD Block, in South 24 Parganas district across the Hooghly, in the north, Diamond Harbour I CD Block, in South 24 Parganas district across the Hooghly, in the east, Haldia CD Block in the south and Mahishadal CD Block in the west.

Sutahata CD Block has an area of 79.54 km^{2}. It has 1 panchayat samity, 6 gram panchayats, 89 gram sansads (village councils), 81 mouzas and 78 inhabited villages. Sutahata police station serves this block. Headquarters of this CD Block is at Sutahata.

Gram panchayats of Sutahata block/ panchayat samiti are: Ashadtalia, Chaitanyapur, Deulpota, Guaberia, Horekhali, Joynagar and Kukrahati.

== Demographics ==
=== Population ===
As per 2011 Census of India Sutahata CD Block had a total population of 123,784, of which 118,629 were rural and 5,155 were urban. There were 63,509 (51%) males and 60,275 (49%) females. Population below 6 years was 15,227. Scheduled Castes numbered 37,826 (30.56%) and Scheduled Tribes numbered 47 (0.04%).

As per 2001 census, Sutahata block had a total population of 106,301, out of which 54,548 were males and 51,753 were females. Sutahata block registered a population growth of 7.30 per cent during the 1991-2001 decade. Decadal growth for the combined Midnapore district was 14.87 per cent. Decadal growth in West Bengal was 17.84 per cent.

Census Town in Sutahata CD Block (2011 census figure in brackets): Barda (5,155).

Large village (with 4,000+ population) in Sutahata CD Block (2011 census figure in brackets): Hariballabhpur (4,153).

Other villages in Sutahata CD Block (2011 census figures in brackets): Chaitanyapur (3,169), Guaberia (3,896), Ashadtalia (1,656), Jaynagar (3,610).

=== Literacy ===
As per 2011 census the total number of literates in Sutahata CD Block was 92,725 (85.42% of the population over 6 years) out of which 50,465 (54%) were males and 42,260 (46%) were females.

As per 2011 census, literacy in Purba Medinipur district was 87.02%. Purba Medinipur had the highest literacy amongst all the districts of West Bengal in 2011.

See also – List of West Bengal districts ranked by literacy rate

Literacy in CD blocks of
Purba Medinipur district
Tamluk subdivision
Tamluk – 87.06%
Sahid Matangini – 86.99%
Panskura I – 83.65%
Panskura II – 84.93%
Nandakumar – 85.56%
Chandipur – 87.81%
Moyna – 86.33%
Haldia subdivision
Mahishadal – 86.21%
Nandigram I – 84.89%
Nandigram II – 89.16%
Sutahata – 85.42%
Haldia – 85.96%
Contai subdivision
Contai I – 89.32%
Contai II – 88.33%
Contai III – 89.88%
Khejuri I – 88.90%
Khejuri II – 85.37%
Ramnagar I – 87.84%
Ramnagar II – 89.38%
Bhagabanpur II – 90.98%
Egra subdivision
Bhagabanpur I – 88.13%
Egra I – 82.83%
Egra II – 86.47%
Patashpur I – 86.58%
Patashpur II – 86.50%
2011 Census: CD Block Wise

Primary Census Abstract Data

=== Language and religion ===
Religion in Sutahata CD block (2011)
Hinduism	72.05%
Islam	27.78%
Other or not stated	0.17%

In 2011 census Hindus numbered 89,193 and formed 72.05% of the population in Sutahata CD Block. Muslims numbered 34,386 and formed 27.78% of the population. Others numbered 205 and formed 0.17% of the population. In 2001, Hindus made up 74.10% and Muslims 25.83% of the population respectively.

Bengali is the predominant language, spoken by 99.94% of the population.

== Rural poverty ==
The District Human Development Report for Purba Medinipur has provided a CD Block-wise data table for Modified Human Poverty Index of the district. Sutahata CD Block registered 29.72 on the MHPI scale. The CD Block-wise mean MHPI was estimated at 24.78. Eleven out of twentyfive CD Blocks were found to be severely deprived in respect of grand CD Block average value of MHPI (CD Blocks with lower amount of poverty are better): All the CD Blocks of Haldia and Contai subdivisions appeared backward, except Ramnagar I & II, of all the blocks of Egra subdivision only Bhagabanpur I appeared backward and in Tamluk subdivision none appeared backward.

== Economy ==
=== Livelihood ===
In Sutahata CD Block in 2011, total workers formed 32.43% of the total population and amongst the class of total workers, cultivators formed 8.21%, agricultural labourers 40.76%, household industry workers 2.95% and other workers 48.08%.

=== Infrastructure ===
There are 78 inhabited villages in Sutahata CD block. All 78 villages (100%) have power supply. All 78 villages (100%) have drinking water supply. 16 villages (20.51%) have post offices. All 78 villages (100%) have telephones (including landlines, public call offices and mobile phones). 15 villages (19.23%) have a pucca (paved) approach road and 18 villages (23.08%) have transport communication (includes bus service, rail facility and navigable waterways). 9 villages (11.54%) have agricultural credit societies. 8 villages (10.26%) have banks.

In 2007–08, around 40% of rural households in the district had electricity.

In 2013–14, there were 24 fertiliser depots, 10 seed stores and 18 fair price shops in the CD Block.

=== Agriculture ===
Persons engaged in agriculture
in Sutahata CD Block
1. Bargadars (9.41%)
2. Patta holders (9.57%)
3. Small farmers (4.10%)
4. Marginal farmers (29.5%)
5. Agricultural labourers (47.5%)

According to the District Human Development Report of Purba Medinipur: The agricultural sector is the lifeline of a predominantly rural economy. It is largely dependent on the Low Capacity Deep Tubewells (around 50%) or High Capacity Deep Tubewells (around 27%) for irrigation, as the district does not have a good network of canals, compared to some of the neighbouring districts. In many cases the canals are drainage canals which get the backflow of river water at times of high tide or the rainy season. The average size of land holding in Purba Medinipur, in 2005–06, was 0.73 hectares against 1.01 hectares in West Bengal.

In 2013–14, the total area irrigated in Sutahata CD Block was 3,500 hectares, out of which 200 hectares were irrigated by tank water and 3,300 hectares by other means.

In 2003-04 net area sown in Sutahata CD Block was 4,830 hectares and the area in which more than one crop was grown was 4,303 hectares. Although the Bargadari Act of 1950 recognised the rights of bargadars to a higher share of crops from the land that they tilled, it was not implemented fully. Large tracts, beyond the prescribed limit of land ceiling, remained with the rich landlords. From 1977 onwards major land reforms took place in West Bengal. Land in excess of land ceiling was acquired and distributed amongst the peasants. Following land reforms land ownership pattern has undergone transformation. In 2013–14, persons engaged in agriculture in Sutahata CD Block could be classified as follows: bargadars 9.41%, patta (document) holders 9.57%, small farmers (possessing land between 1 and 2 hectares) 4.10%, marginal farmers (possessing land up to 1 hectare) 29.47% and agricultural labourers 47.45%.

In 2013–14, Sutahata CD Block produced 5,803 tonnes of Aman paddy, the main winter crop, from 4,596 hectares, 3,891 tonnes of Boro paddy, the spring crop, from 1,206 hectares and 382 tonnes of potatoes from 14 hectares. It also produced pulses.

Betelvine is a major source of livelihood in Purba Medinipur district, particularly in Tamluk and Contai subdivisions. Betelvine production in 2008-09 was the highest amongst all the districts and was around a third of the total state production. In 2008–09, Purba Mednipur produced 2,789 tonnes of cashew nuts from 3,340 hectares of land.

Concentration of Handicraft Activities in CD Blocks
- Horn Craft - Kolaghat
- Pata Chitra - Chandipur, Nandakumar
- Sea Shell – Ramnagar I & II
- Mat & Mat Diversified Products – Ramnagar I, Egra I & II, Patashpur I
- Brass & Bell Metal – Ramnagar I, Mahisadal, Patashpur II, Egra I
- Diversified Jute Products – Ramnagar II, Nandakumar, Kolaghat, Shahid Matangini
- Cane & Bamboo Products - Chandipur, Nandakumar, Kolaghat, Shahid Matangini
- Sola Craft - Tamluk, Kolaghat
- Pottery/Terracotta - Panskura, Tamluk, Sahid Matangini, Nandakumar
- Wood Craft - Tamluk
- Zari work- Sutahta, Mahisadal, Haldia, Nandakumar

Source: District Human Development Report, Purba Medinipur, Page 97

=== Pisciculture ===
Purba Medinipur's net district domestic product derives one fifth of its earnings from fisheries, the highest amongst all the districts of West Bengal. The nett area available for effective pisciculture in Sutahata CD Block in 2013-14 was 473.10 hectares. 3,030 persons were engaged in the profession and approximate annual production was 18,025 quintals.

=== Banking ===
In 2013–14, Sutahata CD Block had offices of 11 commercial banks and 2 gramin banks.

=== Backward Regions Grant Fund ===
Medinipur East district is listed as a backward region and receives financial support from the Backward Regions Grant Fund. The fund, created by the Government of India, is designed to redress regional imbalances in development. As of 2012, 272 districts across the country were listed under this scheme. The list includes 11 districts of West Bengal.

== Transport ==
Sutahata CD Block has 3 ferry services and 15 originating/ terminating bus routes. There is a ferry service across the Hooghly between Raichak in Diamond Harbour II CD Block and Kukrahati in this CD Block. The ferry service is available every 30 minutes from 6-00 am on both sides to 8-00 pm at Kukrahati and 8-40 pm at Raichak. There are regular bus services between Esplanade and Raichak and between Kukrahati and Haldia.

Barda and Basuliyasutahata are stations on the Panskura-Haldia line. The line was constructed in 1968 and was electrified in 1974–76.

== Education ==
In 2013–14, Sutahata CD Block had 80 primary schools with 4,241 students, 5 middle schools with 430 students, 8 high schools with 5,406 students and 13 higher secondary schools with 15,297 students. Sutahata CD Block had 1 general college with 2,198 students, 4 technical/ professional institutes with 322 students and 221 institutions for special and non-formal education with 6,935 students.

As per the 2011 census, in Suthata CD block, amongst the 78 inhabited villages, 5 villages did not have a school, 24 villages had two or more primary schools, 20 villages had at least 1 primary and 1 middle school and 14 villages had at least 1 middle and 1 secondary school.

Vivekananda Mission Mahavidyalaya at PO Chaitanyapur, on the Haldia-Kukrahati Road, was established in 1968. It offers courses in arts, science and commerce.

== Healthcare ==
In 2014, Sutahata CD Block had 1 block primary health centre, 3 primary health centres and 2 private nursing homes with total 115 beds and 6 doctors (excluding private bodies). It had 20 family welfare sub centres. 598 patients were treated indoor and 154,662 patients were treated outdoor in the hospitals, health centres and subcentres of the CD Block.

Amlat Block Primary Health Centre at Sutahata (with 10 beds) is the main medical facility in Sutahata CD block. There are primary health centres at Joynagar, PO Dorojoynagar (with 6 beds) and Begunberia, PO Golapchak (with 10 beds).
