= Reyepara =

- Village
- Location in West Bengal, India Reyepara (India)
- Coordinates: 22°03′24.8″N 87°53′48.1″E
- Country: India
- State: West Bengal
- District: Purba Medinipur

Population (2011)
  - Total: 3,059

Languages
  - Official: Bengali, English
- Time zone: UTC+5:30 (IST)
- PIN: 721650 (Reyepara)
- Telephone/STD code: 03224
- Lok Sabha constituency: Tamluk
- Vidhan Sabha constituency: Nandigram
- Website: purbamedinipur.gov.in

Reyepara is a village, in Nandigram II CD Block in Haldia subdivision of Purba Medinipur district in the state of West Bengal, India.

== Geography ==
Cities and towns in Haldia subdivision of Purba Medinipur district
M: municipal city/ town, CT: census town, R: rural/ urban centre, S: port
Owing to space constraints in the small map, the actual locations in a larger map may vary slightly

=== CD block HQ ===
The headquarters of Nandigram II CD block are located at Reyepara.

=== Urbanisation ===
79.19% of the population of Haldia subdivision live in the rural areas. Only 20.81% of the population live in the urban areas, and that is the highest proportion of urban population amongst the four subdivisions in Purba Medinipur district.

Note: The map alongside presents some of the notable locations in the subdivision. All places marked in the map are linked in the larger full screen map.

== Demographics ==
As per 2011 Census of India Reyepara had a total population of 3,059 of which 1,528 (50%) were males and 1,531 (50%) were females. Population below 6 years was 321. The total number of literates in Reyepara was 2,439 (89.08% of the population over 6 years).

== Transport ==
The Chandipur-Nandigram Road passes through Reyepara.

== Healthcare ==
Reapara Rural Hospital at Reapara (with 30 beds) is the main medical facility in Nandigram II CD block. There are primary health centres at Boyal (with 6 beds) and Amdabad (with 10 beds).
