= Chaitanyapur =

- Village
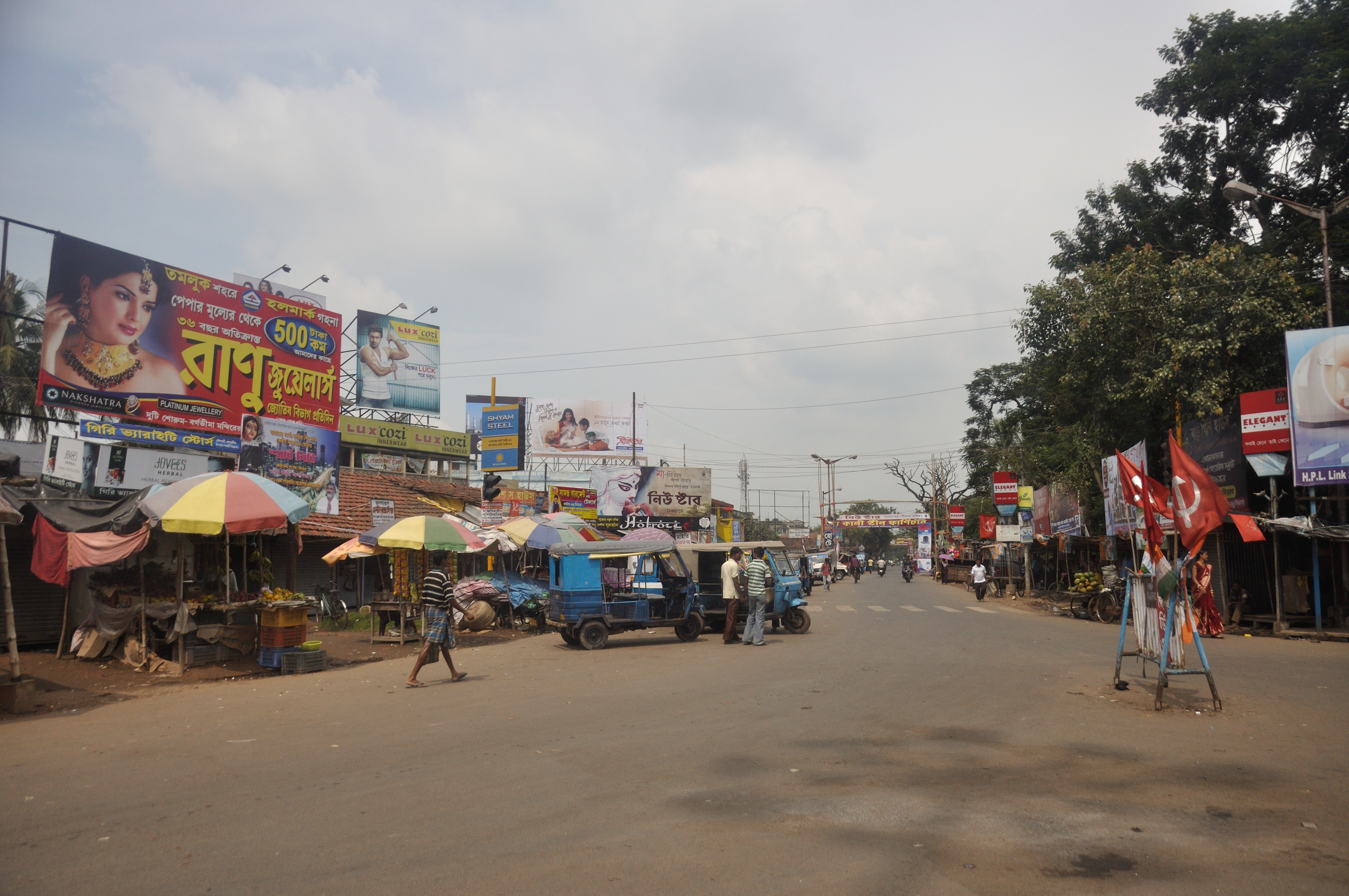

- Location in West Bengal, India Chaitanyapur (India)
- Coordinates: 22.1436°N 88.0834°E
- Country: India
- State: West Bengal
- District: Purba Medinipur
- Elevation: 7 m (23 ft)

Population (2011)
  - Total: 3,169

Languages
  - Official: Bengali, English
- Time zone: UTC+5:30 (IST)
- PIN: 721645, 721654 (Chaitanyapur)
- Telephone/STD code: 03224
- Lok Sabha constituency: Tamluk
- Vidhan Sabha constituency: Haldia
- Website: purbamedinipur.gov.in

Chaitanyapur is a village and a gram panchayat, in Sutahata CD block in Haldia subdivision of Purba Medinipur district in the state of West Bengal, India.

== Demographics ==
As per 2011 Census of India Chaitanyapur had a total population of 3,169 of which 1,660 (52%) were males and 1,509 (48%) were females. Population below 6 years was 286. The total number of literates in Chaitanyapur was 2,692 (93.38% of the population over 6 years).

== Geography ==
Cities and towns in Haldia subdivision of Purba Medinipur district
M: municipal city/ town, CT: census town, R: rural/ urban centre, S: port
Owing to space constraints in the small map, the actual locations in a larger map may vary slightly

=== Location ===
Chaitanyapur is located at 22.1436°N 88.0834°E.

=== Urbanisation ===
79.19% of the population of Haldia subdivision live in the rural areas. Only 20.81% of the population live in the urban areas, and that is the highest proportion of urban population amongst the four subdivisions in Purba Medinipur district.

Note: The map alongside presents some of the notable locations in the subdivision. All places marked in the map are linked in the larger full screen map.

== Education ==
Vivekananda Mission Mahavidyalaya at PO Chaitanyapur was established in 1968. It offers courses in arts, science and commerce. Vivekananda Mission Asram Sikshayatan and Saradamoni Vidyalaya are also notable school in chaitanyapur.

== Transport ==
Chaitanyapur is located at the crossing of Kukrahati-Haldia Road and Haldia-Tamluk-Mecheda Road.

Barda railway station nearby is a station on the Panskura-Haldia line. The line was constructed in 1968 and was electrified in 1974-76.
