= Nandigram I =

- Community development block
- Coordinates: 22.0081°N 87.9837°E
- Country: India
- State: West Bengal
- District: Purba Medinipur

Government
  - Type: Community development block

Area
  - Total: 181.84 km^{2} (70.21 sq mi)
- Elevation: 7 m (23 ft)

Population (2011)
  - Total: 207,835
  - Density: 1,143.0/km^{2} (2,960.2/sq mi)

Languages
  - Official: Bengali, English
- Time zone: UTC+5:30 (IST)
- PIN: 721631 (Nandigram); 721646 (Tekhalibazar)
- Area code: 03224
- Vehicle registration: WB-29, WB-30, WB-31, WB-32, WB-33
- Literacy: 84.89%
- Lok Sabha constituency: Tamluk
- Vidhan Sabha constituency: Nandigram
- Website: purbamedinipur.gov.in

Nandigram I is a community development block that forms an administrative division in Haldia subdivision of Purba Medinipur district in the Indian state of West Bengal.

== History ==
=== Historical background ===
The people of Nandigram, along with others in Medinipur district, were at the forefront of many political movements in the past. They took part in the boycott of British goods in 1901, the Khilafat and non-cooperation movements in 1921, in opposing the chowkidari tax, the Salt Satyagraha in 1930 and the Tebhaga movement in 1946. The Tebhaga movement was spearheaded by the CPI, which had developed a base in this district prior to its bifurcation.

=== Nandigram movement ===
Haldia Development Authority issued a notification for land acquisition for a chemical hub, covering both Nandigram I and Nandigram II CD Blocks, on 28 December 2006. According to one estimate some 95,000 people were going to be displaced in both the blocks. However, Nadigram I CD Block was the main area affected by land acquisition. 18,123 acres were going to be acquired here affecting 38 villages. The notice issued by Haldia Development Authority gave out the names of total 29 mouzas at the Nandigram I and Khejuri II CD Blocks that had primarily been shortlisted for the proposed chemical hub. It included 5 Gram Panchayats in Nandigram I CD Block namely Sona Chura, Kalicharanpur, Kendemari, Muhammadpur and Bhekutia and 1 Gram Panchayat in Khejuri II Block namely Khejuri. Protests against land acquisition snowballed into a major movement, led by Bhumi Uchhed Pratirodh Committee and large scale repression. The location of the proposed chemical hub was later shifted to Nayachar and the proposal was finally scrapped.

== Geography ==
Purba Medinipur district is part of the lower Indo-Gangetic Plain and Eastern coastal plains. Topographically, the district can be divided into two parts – (a) almost entirely flat plains on the west, east and north, (b) the coastal plains on the south. The vast expanse of land is formed of alluvium and is composed of younger and coastal alluvial. The elevation of the district is within 10 metres above mean sea level. The district has a long coastline of 65.5 km along its southern and south eastern boundary. Five coastal CD Blocks, namely, Khejuri II, Contai II (Deshapran), Contai I, Ramnagar I and II, are occasionally affected by cyclones and tornadoes. Tidal floods are quite regular in these five CD Blocks. Normally floods occur in 21 of the 25 CD Blocks in the district. The major rivers are Haldi, Rupnarayan, Rasulpur, Bagui and Keleghai, flowing in north to south or south-east direction. River water is an important source of irrigation. The district has a low 899 hectare forest cover, which is 0.02% of its geographical area.

Nandigram is located at 22°00′29″N 87°59′01″E.

Nandigram I CD Block is bounded by Haldia CD Block, across the Haldi in the north, Kakdwip and Sagar CD Blocks, both in South 24 Parganas district, across the Hooghly estuary, in the east, Khejuri I and Khejuri II CD Blocks in the south and Nandigram II CD Block in the west.

It is located 40 km from Tamluk, the district headquarters.

Nandigram I CD Block has an area of 181.84 km^{2}. It has 1 panchayat samity, 10 gram panchayats, 140 gram sansads (village councils), 99 mouzas and 98 inhabited villages. Nandigram police station serves this block. Headquarters of this CD Block is at Nandigram.

Gram panchayats of Nandigram I block or panchayat samiti are: Bhekutia, Daudpur, Gokulnagar, Haripur, Kalicharanpur, Kendemarijalpai, Mahammadpur, Nandigram, Samsabad and Sonachura.

== Demographics ==
=== Population ===
As per the 2011 Census of India Nandigram I CD Block had a total population of 207,835, of which 202,032 were rural and 5,803 were urban. There were 106,827 (51%) males and 101,008 (49%) females. Population below 6 years was 28,384. Scheduled Castes numbered 38,619 (18.58%) and Scheduled Tribes numbered 139 (0.07%).

As per the 2001 census, Nandigram I block had a total population of 174,665, out of which 88,963 were males and 85,702 were females. Nandigram I block registered a population growth of 18.18 per cent during the 1991-2001 decade. Decadal growth for the combined Midnapore district was 14.87 per cent. Decadal growth in West Bengal was 17.84 per cent.

Census Town in Nandigram I CD Block (2011 census population figure in brackets): Nandigram (5,803).

Large villages (with 4,000+ population) in Nandigram I CD Block (2011 census figures in brackets): Mahammadpur (6,322), Kenda Mari Jalpai (7,604), Gar Chakraberya (4,274), Samsabad (8,279), Haripur (4,400), Naynan (4,277), Daudpur (6,132), Amgechhya (5,333), Gokul Nagar (7,213), Jalpai Part VII (7,369), Kalicharanpur (9,257), Gangra (4,719) and Sona Chura (5,736).

Other villages in Nandigram I CD Block (2011 census figures in brackets): Bhekutya (3,352).

=== Literacy ===
As per 2011 census the total number of literates in Nandigram I CD Block was 152,339 (84.89% of the population over 6 years) out of which 81,810 (88.86%) were males and 70,529 (80.71%) were females.

As per 2011 census, literacy in Purba Medinipur district was 87.02%. Purba Medinipur had the highest literacy amongst all the districts of West Bengal in 2011.

See also – List of West Bengal districts ranked by literacy rate

Literacy in CD blocks of
Purba Medinipur district
Tamluk subdivision
Tamluk – 87.06%
Sahid Matangini – 86.99%
Panskura I – 83.65%
Panskura II – 84.93%
Nandakumar – 85.56%
Chandipur – 87.81%
Moyna – 86.33%
Haldia subdivision
Mahishadal – 86.21%
Nandigram I – 84.89%
Nandigram II – 89.16%
Sutahata – 85.42%
Haldia – 85.96%
Contai subdivision
Contai I – 89.32%
Contai II – 88.33%
Contai III – 89.88%
Khejuri I – 88.90%
Khejuri II – 85.37%
Ramnagar I – 87.84%
Ramnagar II – 89.38%
Bhagabanpur II – 90.98%
Egra subdivision
Bhagabanpur I – 88.13%
Egra I – 82.83%
Egra II – 86.47%
Patashpur I – 86.58%
Patashpur II – 86.50%
2011 Census: CD Block Wise

Primary Census Abstract Data

=== Language and religion ===
Religion in Nandigram I CD block (2011)
Hinduism	65.82%
Islam	34.04%
Other or not stated	0.14%

In 2011 census Hindus numbered 136,789 and formed 65.82% of the population in Nandigram I CD Block. Muslims numbered 70,756 and formed 34.04% of the population. Others numbered 290 and formed 0.14% of the population. In 2001, Hindus made up 68.01% and Muslims 31.92% of the population respectively.

Bengali is the predominant language, spoken by 99.97% of the population.

== Rural poverty ==
The District Human Development Report for Purba Medinipur has provided a CD Block-wise data table for Modified Human Poverty Index of the district. Nandigram I CD Block registered 25.91 on the MHPI scale. The CD Block-wise mean MHPI was estimated at 24.78. Eleven out of twentyfive CD Blocks were found to be severely deprived in respect of grand CD Block average value of MHPI (CD Blocks with lower amount of poverty are better): All the CD Blocks of Haldia and Contai subdivisions appeared backward, except Ramnagar I & II, of all the blocks of Egra subdivision only Bhagabanpur I appeared backward and in Tamluk subdivision none appeared backward.

== Economy ==
=== Livelihood ===
In Nandigram I CD Block in 2011, total workers formed 31.87% of the total population and amongst the class of total workers, cultivators formed 14.92%, agricultural labourers 43.89%, household industry workers 4.5% and other workers 36.69%.

=== Infrastructure ===
There are 98 inhabited villages in Nandigram I CD block. All 98 villages (100%) have power supply. All 98 villages (100%) have drinking water supply. 22 villages (22.45%) have post offices. All villages (100%) have telephones (including landlines, public call offices and mobile phones). All villages (100%) have more or less pucca (paved) approach road and 7 villages (7.14%) have banks.

=== Agriculture ===
Persons engaged in agriculture
in Nandigram I CD Block
1. Bargadars (13.8%)
2. Patta holders (21.5%)
3. Small farmers (1.66%)
4. Marginal farmers (29.4%)
5. Agricultural labourers (33.6%)

According to the District Human Development Report of Purba Medinipur: The agricultural sector is the lifeline of a predominantly rural economy. It is largely dependent on the Low Capacity Deep Tubewells (around 50%) or High Capacity Deep Tubewells (around 27%) for irrigation, as the district does not have a good network of canals, compared to some of the neighbouring districts. In many cases the canals are drainage canals which get the backflow of river water at times of high tide or the rainy season. The average size of land holding in Purba Medinipur, in 2005–06, was 0.73 hectares against 1.01 hectares in West Bengal.

In 2013–14, the total area irrigated in Nandigram I CD Block was 2,986 hectares, out of which 2,865 hectares were irrigated by tank water and 121 hectares by other means.

Although the Bargadari Act of 1950 recognised the rights of bargadars to a higher share of crops from the land that they tilled, it was not implemented fully. Large tracts, beyond the prescribed limit of land ceiling, remained with the rich landlords. From 1977 onwards major land reforms took place in West Bengal. Land in excess of land ceiling was acquired and distributed amongst the peasants. Following land reforms land ownership pattern has undergone transformation. In 2013–14, persons engaged in agriculture in Nandigram I CD Block could be classified as follows: bargadars 13.85%, patta (document) holders 21.46%, small farmers (possessing land between 1 and 2 hectares) 1.66%, marginal farmers (possessing land up to 1 hectare) 29.40% and agricultural labourers 33.62%.

In 2013–14, Nandigram I CD Block produced 44,514 tonnes of Aman paddy, the main winter crop, from 23,845 hectares, 3,069 tonnes of Boro paddy, the spring crop, from 810 hectares, 6,514 tonnes of Aus paddy, the summer crop, from 3,187 hectares, 41 tonnes of jute from 3 hectares and 7,209 tonnes of potatoes from 429 hectares. It also produced pulses and oil seeds.

Betelvine is a major source of livelihood in Purba Medinipur district, particularly in Tamluk and Contai subdivisions. Betelvine production in 2008-09 was the highest amongst all the districts and was around a third of the total state production. In 2008–09, Purba Mednipur produced 2,789 tonnes of cashew nuts from 3,340 hectares of land.

Concentration of Handicraft Activities in CD Blocks
- Horn Craft - Kolaghat
- Pata Chitra - Chandipur, Nandakumar
- Sea Shell – Ramnagar I & II
- Mat & Mat Diversified Products – Ramnagar I, Egra I & II, Patashpur I
- Brass & Bell Metal – Ramnagar I, Mahisadal, Patashpur II, Egra I
- Diversified Jute Products – Ramnagar II, Nandakumar, Kolaghat, Shahid Matangini
- Cane & Bamboo Products - Chandipur, Nandakumar, Kolaghat, Shahid Matangini
- Sola Craft - Tamluk, Kolaghat
- Pottery/Terracotta - Panskura, Tamluk, Sahid Matangini, Nandakumar
- Wood Craft - Tamluk
- Zari work- Sutahta, Mahisadal, Haldia, Nandakumar

Source: District Human Development Report, Purba Medinipur, Page 97

=== Pisciculture ===
Purba Medinipur's net district domestic product derives one fifth of its earnings from fisheries, the highest amongst all the districts of West Bengal. The nett area available for effective pisciculture in Nandigram I CD Block in 2013-14 was 1,040.45 hectares. 6,520 persons were engaged in the profession and approximate annual production was 40,022 quintals.

=== Banking ===
In 2013–14, Nandigram I CD Block had offices of 6 commercial banks and 1 gramin bank.

=== Backward Regions Grant Fund ===
Medinipur East district is listed as a backward region and receives financial support from the Backward Regions Grant Fund. The fund, created by the Government of India, is designed to redress regional imbalances in development. As of 2012, 272 districts across the country were listed under this scheme. The list includes 11 districts of West Bengal.

== Transport ==
Nandigram I CD Block has 6 ferry services and 22 originating/ terminating bus routes. The nearest railway station is 23 km from the block headquarters.

There are two ferry service across the Haldi River between Haldia and Nandigram – one between Haldia Township and Nandigram and the other between Pari Chak ferry ghat in Haldia and Nandigram. The ferry services are available every 20 minutes,

== Education ==
In 2013–14, Nandigram I CD Block had 121 primary schools with 9,373 students, 10 middle schools with 991 students, 10 high schools with 8,759 students and 14 higher secondary schools with 16,093 students. Nandigram I CD Block had 1 general college with 1,504 students and 329 institutions for special and non-formal education with 18,647 students.

As per the 2011 census, in Nandigram I CD block, amongst the 98 inhabited villages, 3 villages did not have a school, 53 villages had two or more primary schools, 38 villages had at least 1 primary and 1 middle school and 20 villages had at least 1 middle and 1 secondary school.

Sitananda College at Nandigram was established in 1960. It offers courses in arts and science.

== Healthcare ==
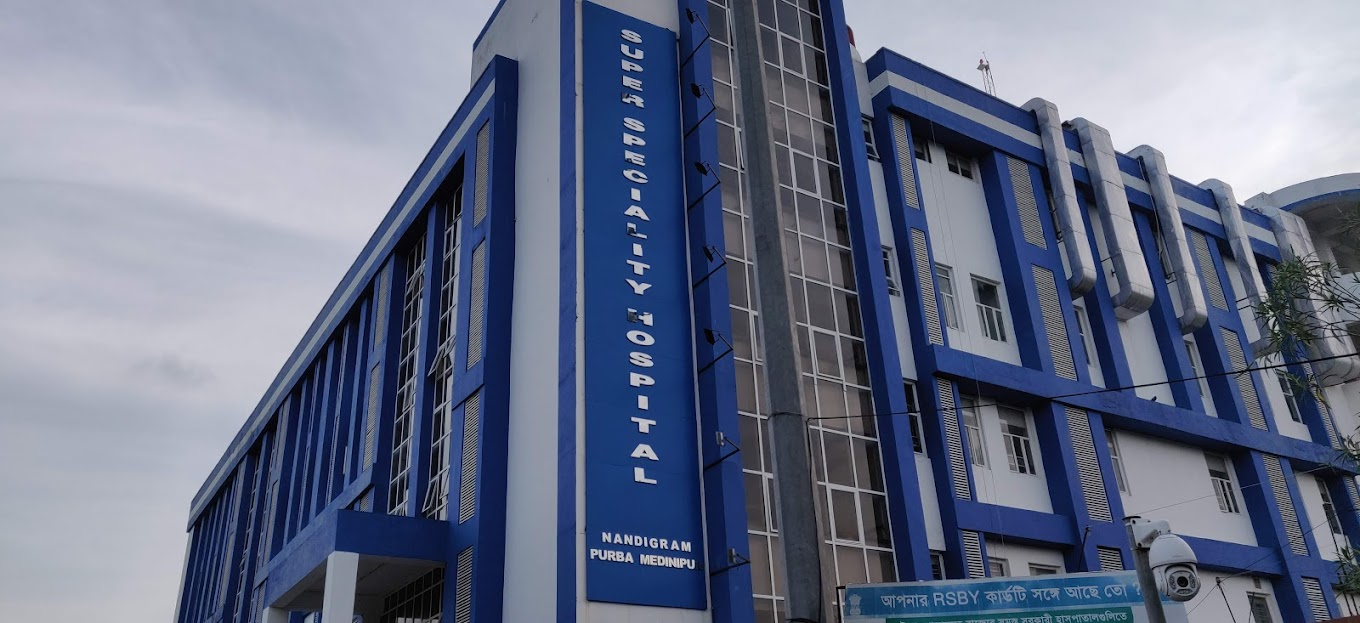
Nandigram SSH/DH

Nandigram Super Speciality Hospital or Nandigram District Hospital at Nandigram is the main medical facility in Nandigram I CD block. There are primary health centres at Mohammadpur, PO Nilpur (with 10 beds) and Mahespur, PO Parulbari (with 6 beds) and it had 30 family welfare sub centres (excluding private bodies).

== Notable people ==
- Sheikh Mohammad Illias (born 1958), member of the Legislative Assembly
