= Ashadtalya =

- Census Town
- Location in West Bengal, India Ashadtalya (India)
- Coordinates: 22.056982°N 87.945773°E
- Country: India
- State: West Bengal
- District: Purba Medinipur

Area
  - Total: 2.8571 km^{2} (1.1031 sq mi)

Population (2011)
  - Total: 5,274
  - Density: 1,846/km^{2} (4,781/sq mi)

Languages
  - Official: Bengali, English
- Time zone: UTC+5:30 (IST)
- PIN: 721656
- Lok Sabha constituency: Tamluk
- Vidhan Sabha constituency: Nandigram
- Website: purbamedinipur.gov.in

Ashadtalya is a census town in Nandigram II CD block in Haldia subdivision of Purba Medinipur district in the state of West Bengal, India.

== Geography ==
Cities and towns in Haldia subdivision of Purba Medinipur district
M: municipal city/ town, CT: census town, R: rural/ urban centre, S: port
Owing to space constraints in the small map, the actual locations in a larger map may vary slightly

=== Location ===
Ashadtalya is located at 22.056982°N 87.945773°E.

== Demographics ==
As per 2011 Census of India Asadtalya had a total population of 5,274 of which 2,722 (52%) were males and 2,552 (48%) were females. Population below 6 years was 653. The total number of literates in Asadtalya was 4,148 (89.76% of the population over 6 years).

== Infrastructure ==
As per the District Census Handbook 2011, Ashadtalya covered an area of 2.8571 km^{2}. Amongst the civic amenities it had 458 domestic electric connections. Amongst the educational facilities it had were 3 primary schools, 2 secondary schools and a senior secondary school. The nearest degree college was at Nandigram 5 km away.
