= Haldia (community development block) =

- Community development block
- Coordinates: 22.03°N 88.06°E
- Country: India
- State: West Bengal
- District: Purba Medinipur

Government
  - Type: Community development block

Area
  - Total: 65.44 km^{2} (25.27 sq mi)
- Elevation: 6 m (20 ft)

Population (2011)
  - Total: 97,992
  - Density: 1,497/km^{2} (3,878/sq mi)

Languages
  - Official: Bengali, English
- Time zone: UTC+5:30 (IST)
- PIN: 721602 (Durgachak); 721604 (Haldia); 721657 (Debhog); 721666 (Chakdwipa); 721645(Deulpota)
- Area code: 03224
- ISO 3166 code: IN-WB
- Vehicle registration: WB-29, WB-30, WB-31, WB-32, WB-33
- Literacy: 85.96%
- Lok Sabha constituency: Tamluk
- Vidhan Sabha constituency: Mahisadal
- Website: purbamedinipur.gov.in

Haldia is a community development block that forms an administrative division in Haldia subdivision of Purba Medinipur district in the Indian state of West Bengal. In earlier days this block was referred to as Sutahata II block, and Sutahata block was referred to as Sutahata I block.

== Geography ==
Purba Medinipur district is part of the lower Indo-Gangetic Plain and Eastern coastal plains. Topographically, the district can be divided into two parts – (a) almost entirely flat plains on the west, east and north, (b) the coastal plains on the south. The vast expanse of land is formed of alluvium and is composed of younger and coastal alluvial. The elevation of the district is within 10 metres above mean sea level. The district has a long coastline of 65.5 km along its southern and south eastern boundary. Five coastal CD Blocks, namely, Khejuri II, Contai II (Deshapran), Contai I, Ramnagar I and II, are occasionally affected by cyclones and tornadoes. Tidal floods are quite regular in these five CD Blocks. Normally floods occur in 21 of the 25 CD Blocks in the district. The major rivers are Haldi, Rupnarayan, Rasulpur, Bagui and Keleghai, flowing in north to south or south-east direction. River water is an important source of irrigation. The district has a low 899 hectare forest cover, which is 0.02% of its geographical area.

Haldia is located at 22°02′N 88°04′E.

Haldia CD Block is bounded by Sutahata CD Block in the north, Diamond Harbour I and Kulpi CD Blocks, both in South 24 Parganas district, across the Hooghly, in the east, Nandigram I CD Block, across the Haldi, in the south and Mahishadal CD Block in the west.

It is located 37 km from Tamluk, the district headquarters.

Haldia CD Block has an area of 65.44 km^{2}. It has 1 panchayat samity, 4 gram panchayats, 70 gram sansads (village councils), 24 mouzas and 24 inhabited villages. Durgachak police station serves this block. Headquarters of this CD Block is at Haldia.

Gram panchayats of Haldia block/ panchayat samiti are: Baruttarhingly, Chakdwipa, Debhog and Deulpota.

== Demographics ==
=== Population ===
As per 2011 Census of India Haldia CD Block had a total population of 97,992, all of which were rural. There were 50,531 (52%) males and 47,461 (48%) females. Population below 6 years was 11,601. Scheduled Castes numbered 7,477 (7.63%) and Scheduled Tribes numbered 288 (0.29%).

As per 2001 census, Haldia block had a total population of 81,585, out of which 41,880 were males and 39,705 were females. Haldia block registered a population growth of -16.69 per cent during the 1991-2001 decade. Decadal growth for the combined Midnapore district was 14.87 per cent. Decadal growth in West Bengal was 17.84 per cent.

Large villages (with 4,000+ population) in Haldia CD Block (2011 census figures in brackets): Baruttar Hingli (4,840), Kasthakhali (4,171), Iswardaha Jalpai (4,640), Banskhana Jalpai (4,326), Brajalal Chak (6,366), Kunarpur (10,516), Barabajitpur (4,751), Barabari (5,051), Kismat Shibramnagar (4,150), Deulpota (4,160), Dwari Berya (5,527), Hadia (4,240) and Bar Basudebpur (6,611).

=== Literacy ===
As per 2011 census the total number of literates in Haldia CD Block was 74,262 (85.96% of the population over 6 years) out of which 40,505 (55%) were males and 33,757 (45%) were females.

As per 2011 census, literacy in Purba Medinipur district was 87.02%. Purba Medinipur had the highest literacy amongst all the districts of West Bengal in 2011.

See also – List of West Bengal districts ranked by literacy rate

Literacy in CD blocks of
Purba Medinipur district
Tamluk subdivision
Tamluk – 87.06%
Sahid Matangini – 86.99%
Panskura I – 83.65%
Panskura II – 84.93%
Nandakumar – 85.56%
Chandipur – 87.81%
Moyna – 86.33%
Haldia subdivision
Mahishadal – 86.21%
Nandigram I – 84.89%
Nandigram II – 89.16%
Sutahata – 85.42%
Haldia – 85.96%
Contai subdivision
Contai I – 89.32%
Contai II – 88.33%
Contai III – 89.88%
Khejuri I – 88.90%
Khejuri II – 85.37%
Ramnagar I – 87.84%
Ramnagar II – 89.38%
Bhagabanpur II – 90.98%
Egra subdivision
Bhagabanpur I – 88.13%
Egra I – 82.83%
Egra II – 86.47%
Patashpur I – 86.58%
Patashpur II – 86.50%
2011 Census: CD Block Wise

Primary Census Abstract Data

=== Language and religion ===
Religion in Haldia CD block (2011)
Hinduism	82.86%
Islam	16.98%
Other or not stated	0.16%

In 2011 census Hindus numbered 81,194 and formed 82.86% of the population in Haldia CD Block. Muslims numbered 16,643 and formed 16.98% of the population. Others numbered 155 and formed 0.16% of the population. In 2001, Hindus made up 85.12% and Muslims 14.79% of the population respectively.

Bengali is the predominant language, spoken by 99.76% of the population.

== Rural poverty ==
The District Human Development Report for Purba Medinipur has provided a CD Block-wise data table for Modified Human Poverty Index of the district. Haldia CD Block registered 28.87 on the MHPI scale. The CD Block-wise mean MHPI was estimated at 24.78. Eleven out of twentyfive CD Blocks were found to be severely deprived in respect of grand CD Block average value of MHPI (CD Blocks with lower amount of poverty are better): All the CD Blocks of Haldia and Contai subdivisions appeared backward, except Ramnagar I & II, of all the blocks of Egra subdivision only Bhagabanpur I appeared backward and in Tamluk subdivision none appeared backward.

== Economy ==
=== Livelihood ===
In Haldia CD Block in 2011, total workers formed 36.51% of the total population and amongst the class of total workers, cultivators formed 15.35%, agricultural labourers 36.55%, household industry workers 2.82% and other workers 45.29%.

=== Infrastructure ===
There are 24 inhabited villages in Haldia CD block. All 24 villages (100%) have power supply. All 24 villages (100%) have drinking water supply. 11 villages (45.83%) have post offices. All 24 villages (100%) have telephones (including landlines, public call offices and mobile phones). 7 villages (29.17%) have a pucca (paved) approach road and 6 villages (25%) have transport communication (includes bus service, rail facility and navigable waterways). 3 villages (12.50%) have agricultural credit societies. 12 villages (50%) have banks.

In 2007-08, around 40% of rural households in the district had electricity.

In 2013-14, there were 11 fertiliser depots, 4 seed stores and 14 fair price shops in the CD Block.

=== Agriculture ===
Persons engaged in agriculture
in Haldia CD Block
1. Bargadars (13.3%)
2. Patta holders (16.3%)
3. Small farmers (1.30%)
4. Marginal farmers (27.7%)
5. Agricultural labourers (41.4%)

According to the District Human Development Report of Purba Medinipur: The agricultural sector is the lifeline of a predominantly rural economy. It is largely dependent on the Low Capacity Deep Tubewells (around 50%) or High Capacity Deep Tubewells (around 27%) for irrigation, as the district does not have a good network of canals, compared to some of the neighbouring districts. In many cases the canals are drainage canals which get the backflow of river water at times of high tide or the rainy season. The average size of land holding in Purba Medinipur, in 2005-06, was 0.73 hectares against 1.01 hectares in West Bengal.

In 2013-14, the total area irrigated in Haldia CD Block was 2,363 hectares, out of which 1,378 hectares were irrigated by canal water, 710 hectares by tank water, 25 hectares by deep tube well and 250 hectares by river lift irrigation.

Although the Bargadari Act of 1950 recognised the rights of bargadars to a higher share of crops from the land that they tilled, it was not implemented fully. Large tracts, beyond the prescribed limit of land ceiling, remained with the rich landlords. From 1977 onwards major land reforms took place in West Bengal. Land in excess of land ceiling was acquired and distributed amongst the peasants. Following land reforms land ownership pattern has undergone transformation. In 2013-14, persons engaged in agriculture in Haldia CD Block could be classified as follows: bargadars 13.31%, patta (document) holders 16.32%, small farmers (possessing land between 1 and 2 hectares) 1.30%, marginal farmers (possessing land up to 1 hectare) 27.71% and agricultural labourers 41.35%.

In 2013-14, Haldia CD Block produced 703 tonnes of Aman paddy, the main winter crop, from 1,571 hectares and 1,369 tonnes of Boro paddy, the spring crop, from 432 hectares. It also produced pulses.

Betelvine is a major source of livelihood in Purba Medinipur district, particularly in Tamluk and Contai subdivisions. Betelvine production in 2008-09 was the highest amongst all the districts and was around a third of the total state production. In 2008-09, Purba Mednipur produced 2,789 tonnes of cashew nuts from 3,340 hectares of land.

Concentration of Handicraft Activities in CD Blocks
- Horn Craft - Kolaghat
- Pata Chitra - Chandipur, Nandakumar
- Sea Shell – Ramnagar I & II
- Mat & Mat Diversified Products – Ramnagar I, Egra I & II, Patashpur I
- Brass & Bell Metal – Ramnagar I, Mahisadal, Patashpur II, Egra I
- Diversified Jute Products – Ramnagar II, Nandakumar, Kolaghat, Shahid Matangini
- Cane & Bamboo Products - Chandipur, Nandakumar, Kolaghat, Shahid Matangini
- Sola Craft - Tamluk, Kolaghat
- Pottery/Terracotta - Panskura, Tamluk, Sahid Matangini, Nandakumar
- Wood Craft - Tamluk
- Zari work- Sutahta, Mahisadal, Haldia, Nandakumar

Source: District Human Development Report, Purba Medinipur, Page 97

=== Pisciculture ===
Purba Medinipur's net district domestic product derives one fifth of its earnings from fisheries, the highest amongst all the districts of West Bengal. The net area available for effective pisciculture in Haldia CD Block in 2013-14 was 750.30 hectares. 3,156 persons were engaged in the profession and approximate annual production was 28,586 quintals.

=== Banking ===
In 2013-14, Haldia CD Block had offices of 1 commercial bank and 3 gramin banks.

=== Haldia port ===
Haldia Dock Complex is an all-weather riverine port, 60 km from the pilotage station, with an annual capacity of 41.71 million tonnes. It comprises 3 riverine oil jetties, 14 berths inside an impounded dock and two riverine barge jetties. It was commissioned in 1977. It is located outside Haldia CD Block.

=== Haldia oil refinery ===
Haldia oil refinery is one of the ten refineries of the Indian Oil Corporation. It was commissioned in 1975. It is located outside Haldia CD Block.

=== Haldia urban industrial complex ===
Haldia petro-chemical complex is one of the largest in India. It is a major industry which created jobs directly and indirectly in and around Haldia. Haldia Petrochemicals is the lead company. Amongst the other companies operating in the Haldia urban industrial complex are: Exide, Shaw Wallace, Tata Chemicals, Hindustan Lever and Mitsubishi Chemical Corporation. The entire industrial complex is located outside Haldia CD Block.

=== Backward Regions Grant Fund ===
Medinipur East district is listed as a backward region and receives financial support from the Backward Regions Grant Fund. The fund, created by the Government of India, is designed to redress regional imbalances in development. As of 2012, 272 districts across the country were listed under this scheme. The list includes 11 districts of West Bengal.

== Transport ==
Haldia CD Block has 1 ferry service and 73 originating/ terminating bus routes.

NH 116, from Kolaghat to Haldia, passes through this block.

== Education ==
In 2013-14, Haldia CD Block had 58 primary schools with 4,053 students, 10 middle schools with 1,035 students, 9 high schools with 4,347 students and 5 higher secondary schools with 5,518 students. Haldia CD Block had 177 institutions for special and non-formal education with 6,980 students.

As per the 2011 census, in Haldia CD block, amongst the 24 inhabited villages, all villages had schools, 22 villages had two or more primary schools, 19 villages had at least 1 primary and 1 middle school and 11 villages had at least 1 middle and 1 secondary school.

== Healthcare ==
In 2014, Haldia CD Block had 1 block primary health centre and 2 primary health centres with total 20 beds and 5 doctors (excluding private bodies). It had 17 family welfare sub centres. 598 patients were treated indoor and 154,662 patients were treated outdoor in the hospitals, health centres and subcentres of the CD Block.

Bargashipur Block Primary Health Centre at Barghasipur (with 10 beds) is the main medical facility in Haldia CD block. There are primary health centres at Debhog (with 10 beds) and Barsundra, PO Iswardahajalpai (with 2 beds).
