= Geonkhali =

- Village
- Location within West Bengal Location within India
- Coordinates: 22°12′0″N 88°3′0″E
- Country: India
- State: West Bengal
- District: East Midnapore
- Subdistrict: Mahishadal
- Time zone: UTC+05:30 (IST)

Geonkhali is a village and scenic tourist spot in the Mahishadal Block of East Midnapore district of West Bengal.

== Geography ==
Cities and towns in Haldia subdivision of Purba Medinipur district
M: municipal city/ town, CT: census town, R: rural/ urban centre, S: port
Owing to space constraints in the small map, the actual locations in a larger map may vary slightly

=== Location ===
It is located 130 km to the south of Kolkata at the confluence of the rivers Hooghly, Rupnarayan and Damodar. At the confluence, the river is so wide as to resemble the sea, making for a spectacular sight. Geonkhali is connected to Gadiara and Noorpur by regular launch services.

=== National Waterway ===
Geonkhali lies at the head of the 623-km long National Waterway 5 that includes the Hijli Tidal Canal and the East Coast Canal linking it to Orissa's Paradip and Dhamra ports and the Matai, Brahmani and Mahanadi rivers.

=== Urbanisation ===
79.19% of the population of Haldia subdivision live in the rural areas. Only 20.81% of the population live in the urban areas, and that is the highest proportion of urban population amongst the four subdivisions in Purba Medinipur district.

Note: The map alongside presents some of the notable locations in the subdivision. All places marked in the map are linked in the larger full screen map.

== Economy ==
=== Water Treatment Plants ===
Geonkhali houses several water treatment plants that supply fresh water to Haldia where the water is saline.

=== Abandoned proposal of a shipyard project ===
A proposed ₹2,200-crore shipyard project by the Apeejay and Bharti groups at Geonkhali was abandoned in the aftermath of the Singur and Nandigram incidents following opposition by local residents to acquisition of their fertile agricultural lands. The village affected were: Bhangagora, Deulpota, Badur, Babupur, Ichhapur and Hariballavpur.
