= Sutahata =

- Neighbourhood in Haldia municipality
- Location in West Bengal, India Sutahata (India)
- Coordinates: 22°07′28.0″N 88°06′41.0″E
- Country: India
- State: West Bengal
- District: East Midnapore

Languages
  - Official: Bengali, English
- Time zone: UTC+5:30 (IST)
- PIN: 721635 (Sutahata)
- Telephone/STD code: 03224
- Lok Sabha constituency: Tamluk
- Vidhan Sabha constituency: Haldia
- Website: eastmidnapore.gov.in

Sutahata is in Ward No. 1 of Haldia municipality in Haldia subdivision of East Midnapore district in the state of West Bengal, India.

== Geography ==
Cities and towns in Haldia subdivision of East Midnapore district
M: municipal city/ town, CT: census town, R: rural/ urban centre, S: port
Owing to space constraints in the small map, the actual locations in a larger map may vary slightly

=== CD block HQ ===
The headquarters of the Sutahata CD block is located at Sutahata.

=== Police station ===
Sutahata police station has jurisdiction over Sutahata CD block. Sutahata police station covers an area of 125 km^{2} with a population of 120,000. Sutahata PS is located in village Sutahata in Ward No. 1 of Haldia municipality.

=== Urbanisation ===
79.19% of the population of Haldia subdivision live in the rural areas. Only 20.81% of the population live in the urban areas, and that is the highest proportion of urban population amongst the four subdivisions in East Midnapore district.

Note: The map alongside presents some of the notable locations in the subdivision. All places marked in the map are linked in the larger full screen map.

== Transport ==
The Haldia-Tamluk-Mecheda Road passes through Sutahata.

Basulya Sutahata railway station is situated on the Panskura-Haldia line.

== Healthcare ==
Amlat Block Primary Health Centre at Sutahata (with 10 beds) is the main medical facility in Sutahata CD block. There are primary health centres at Joynagar, PO Dorojoynagar (with 6 beds) and Begunberia, PO Golapchak (with 10 beds).
