= Mahishadal =

Mahishadal Garh Kamalpur
- Town
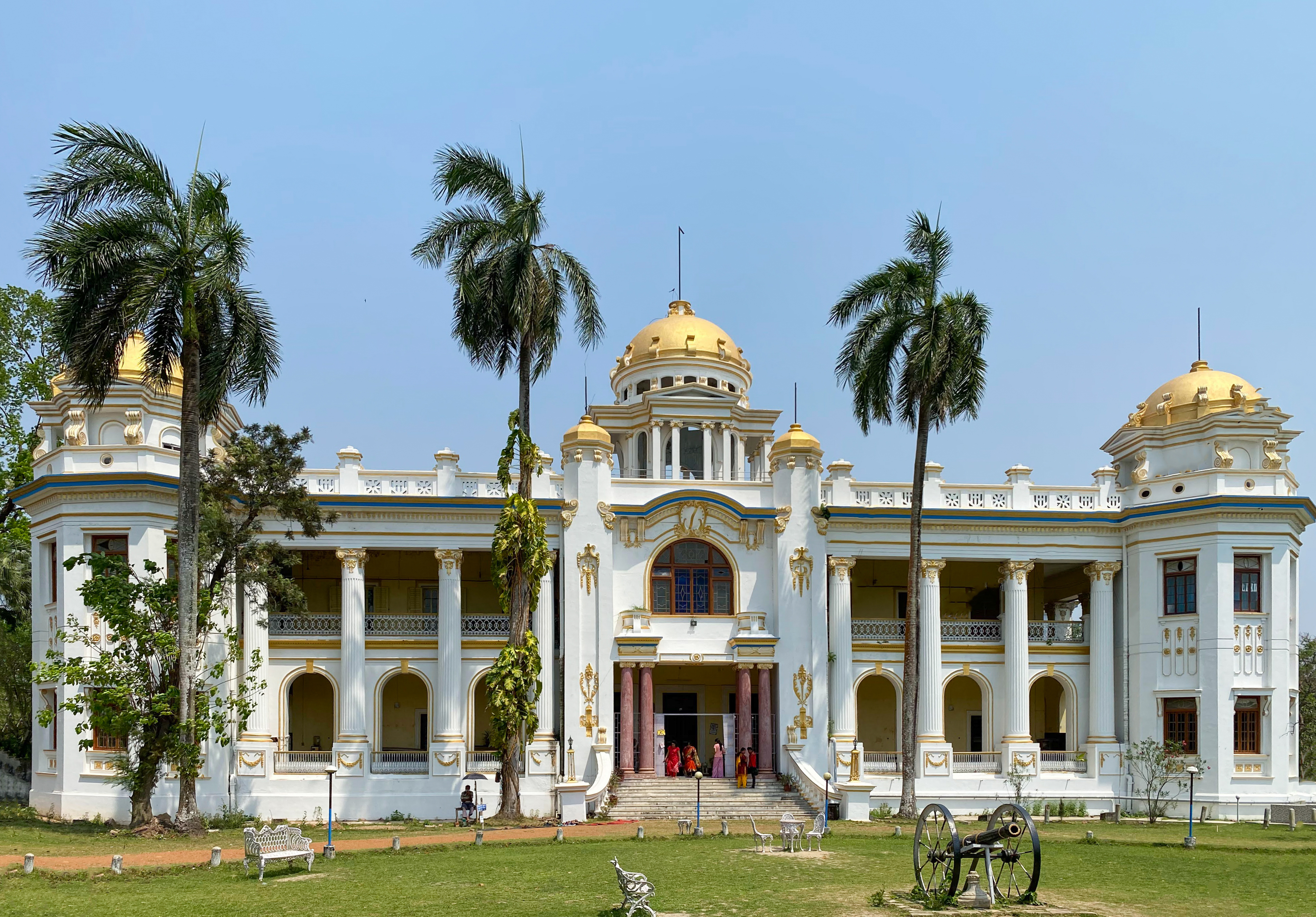
- Mahishadal New Rajbari

- Location in West Bengal, India Mahishadal (India)
- Coordinates: 22°11′00.0″N 87°59′00.0″E
- Country: India
- State: West Bengal
- District: Purba Medinipur

Languages
  - Official: Bengali, English
- Time zone: UTC+5:30 (IST)
- PIN: 721628 (Rangibasan)
- Telephone/STD code: 03224
- Lok Sabha constituency: Tamluk
- Vidhan Sabha constituency: Mahisadal
- Website: purbamedinipur.gov.in

Mahishadal is a town in Mahishadal CD block in Haldia subdivision of Purba Medinipur district in the state of West Bengal, India.

== Culture ==
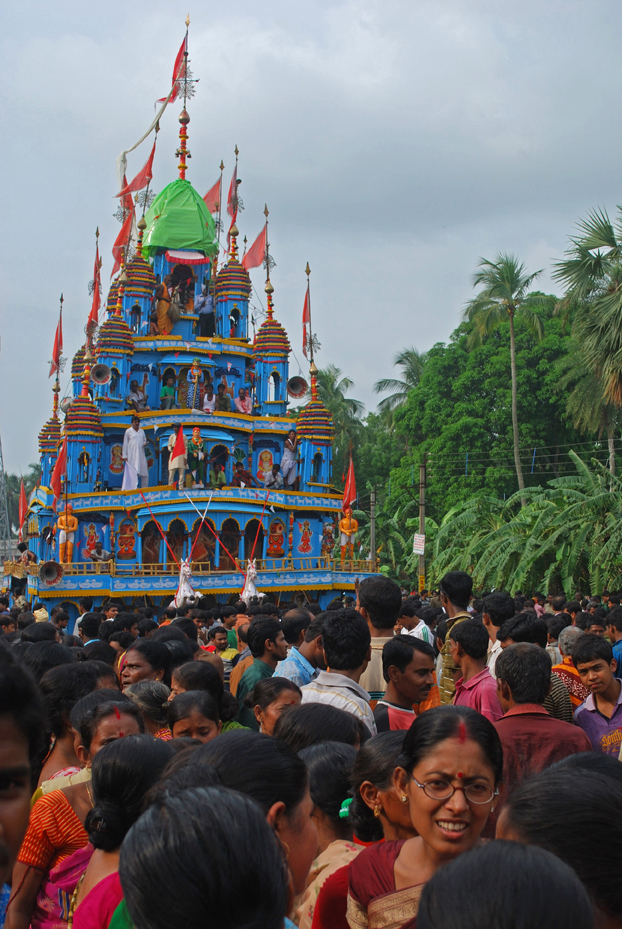
Mahisadal Rathyatra 2012

David J. McCutchion mentions the Madan Gopala temple as a West Bengal nava-ratna, plain and renovated, measuring about 39’ square.

== Demographics ==
As per the map of Mahishadal CD block and subsequent alphabetical list of villages in the District Census Handbook, Purba Medinipur, Mahishadal is a part of Rangibasan village.

As per 2011 Census of India Rangibasan had a total population of 2,570 of which 1,321 (51%) were males and 1,249 (49%) were females. Population below 6 years was 231. The total number of literates in Rangibasan was 2,134 (91.24% of the population over 6 years).

== Geography ==
Cities and towns in Haldia subdivision of Purba Medinipur district
M: municipal city/ town, CT: census town, R: rural/ urban centre, S: port
Owing to space constraints in the small map, the actual locations in a larger map may vary slightly

=== Mahishadal Rajbari ===
Like other Raj families of East Midnapore, Mahisadal Raj also belonged to a Mahishya family (arguably the word Mahishadal itself originated from the word "Mahishya"). It was founded by Bhuiya Ray Mahapatra, whose sixth descendant, Kalyan Ray, could not realize the revenue and had to furnish Janardan Upadhaya, a Brahmin of substance, as his security. The zamindari was held over a century by this Brahmin family till the Permanent Settlement. During the days of Rani Janaki Devi, it reached its zenith in the 18th century. There are two palaces – the old one was built in 1840 and the new one in 1935. One can see stuffed animals, hunting weapons of the 16th and 17th century, paintings and furniture. Gopaljew and Ramjew temples are popular with tourists. The place is half an hours drive from Haldia.

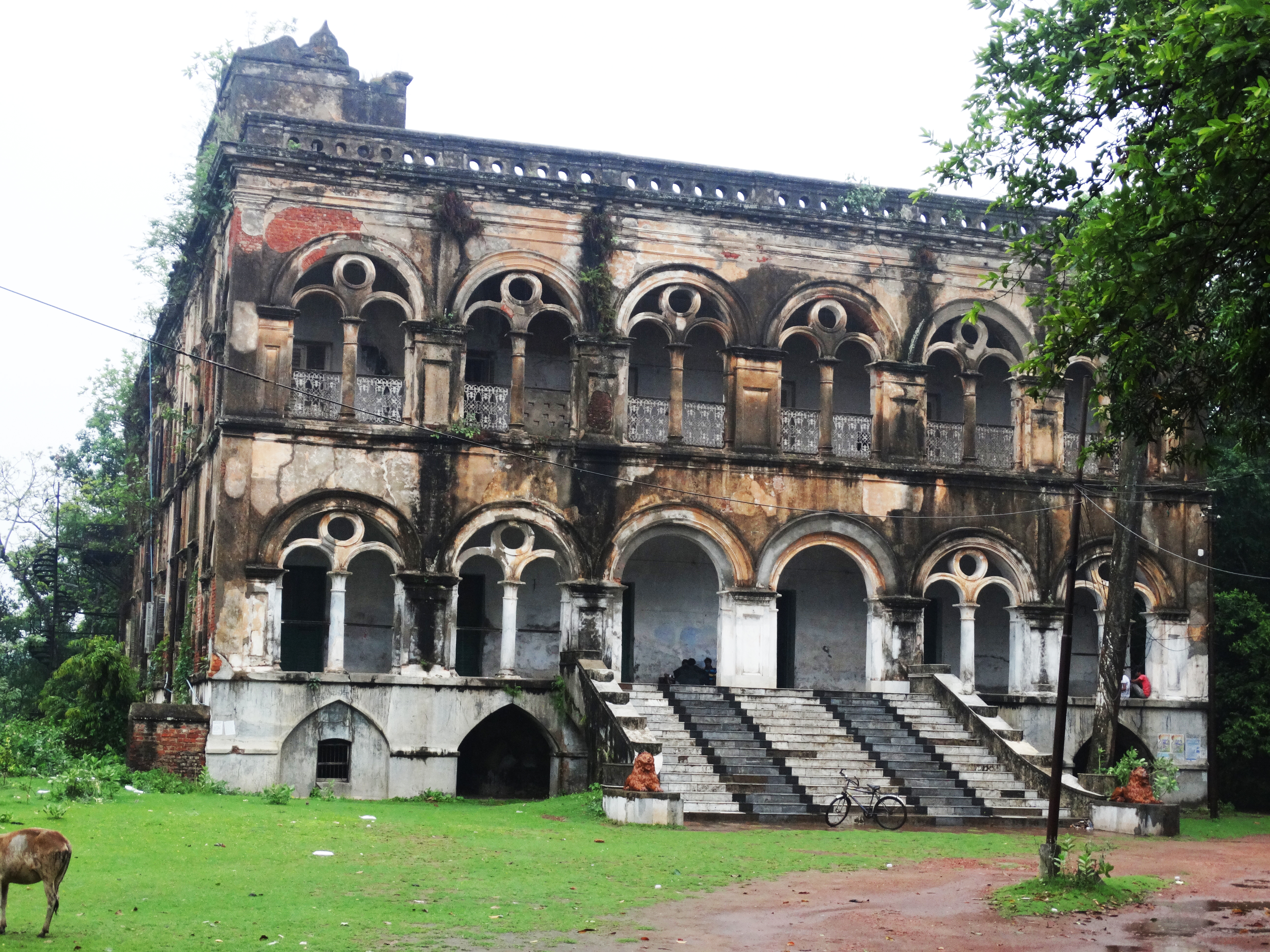
Mahishadal's old rajbari

=== Police station ===
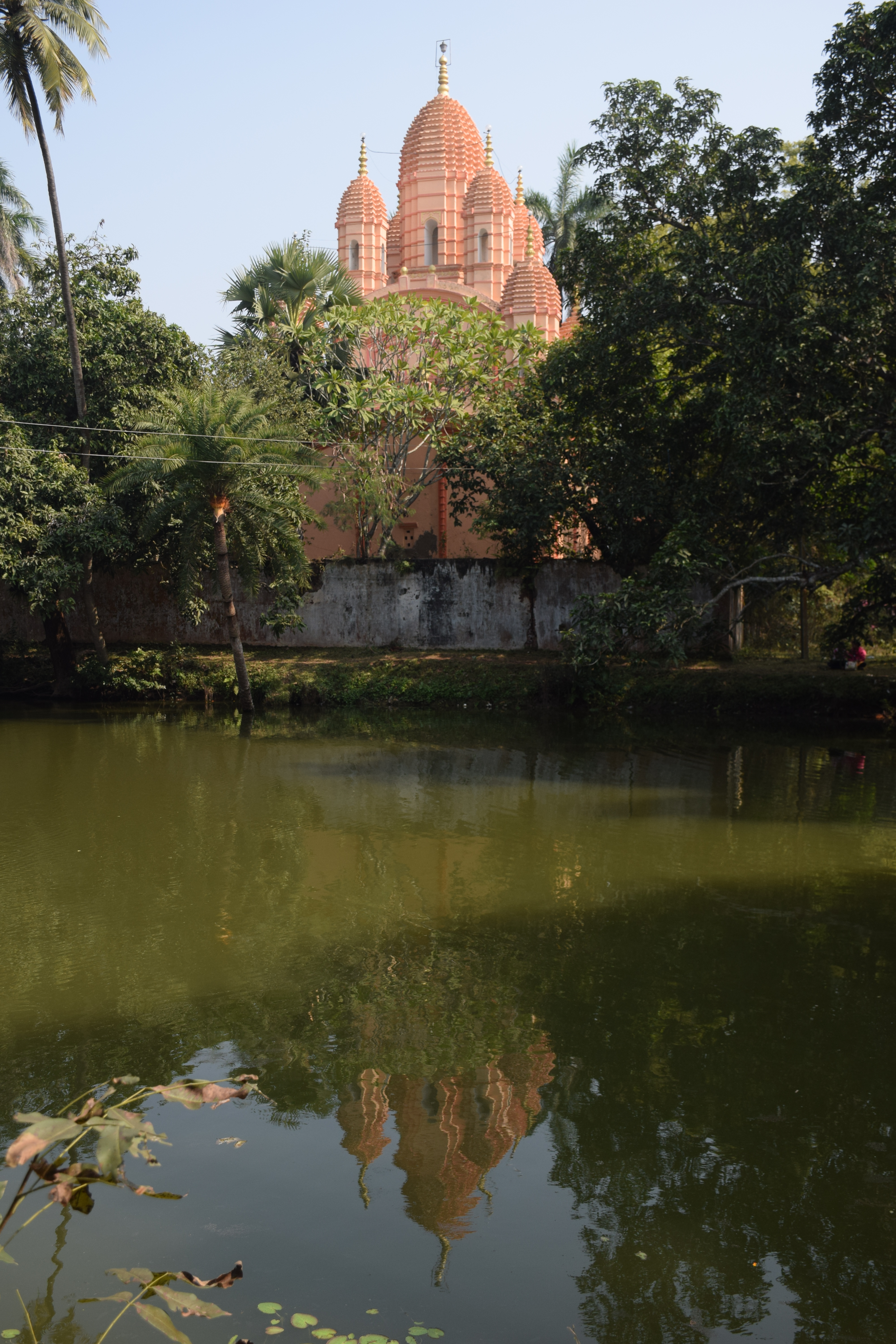
Gopaljiu temple

Mahishadal police station has jurisdiction over Mahishadal CD block. Mahishadal police station covers an area of 135 km^{2} with a population of 182,365. The police station is located at Garh Kamalpur mouza.

=== CD block HQ ===
The headquarters of Mahishadal CD block are located at Rangibasan.

=== Urbanisation ===
79.19% of the population of Haldia subdivision live in the rural areas. Only 20.81% of the population live in the urban areas, and that is the highest proportion of urban population amongst the four subdivisions in Purba Medinipur district.

Note: The map above presents some of the notable locations in the subdivision. All places marked in the map are linked in the larger full screen map.

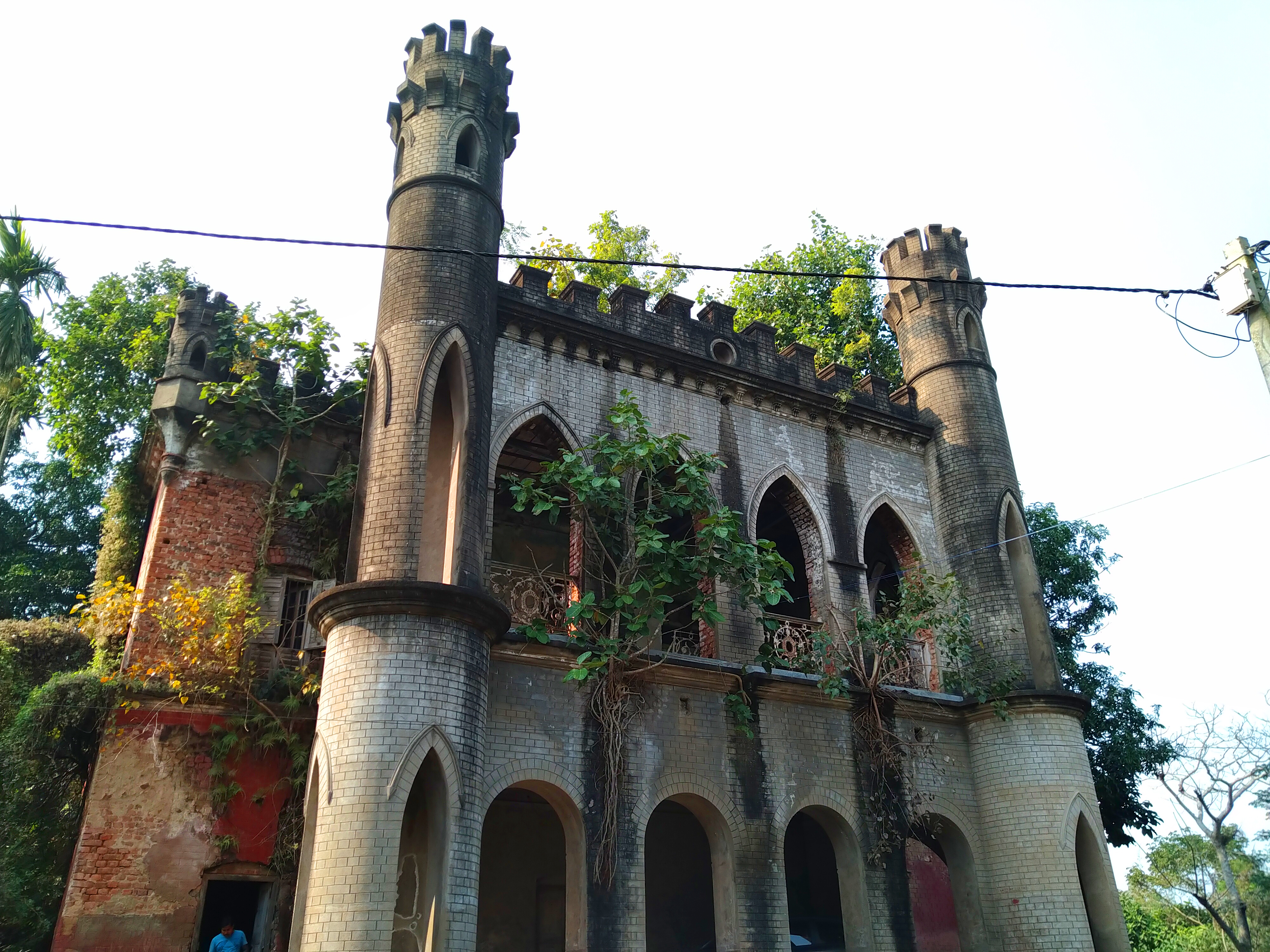
Façade of Dewan Bari, within the Mahisadal Rajbari.

== Education ==
- Mahishadal Girls College was established in 1969 with the initiative of Dr. Satyendranath Bhuniya, Rabindranath Singha, Dr. Haridas Sarkar, Gopal Chandra Mondal and others. Affiliated to Vidyasagar University, it offers courses in arts and science.
- Mahishadal Raj College was established at Garh Kamalpur in 1946. A coeducational institution, it is affiliated to Vidyasagar University. It offers courses in arts, science and commerce.

== Healthcare ==
Basulia Rural Hospital located at nearby Basulia (with 30 beds) is the main medical facility in Mahishadal CD block. There are primary health centres at Natsal, PO Geonkhali (with 10 beds) and Rajarampur, PO Geonkhali (with ? beds).

== Transport ==
The Mecheda-Tamluk-Haldia Road passes through Mahishadal.

Mahishadal railway station and Satish Samanta Halt railway station are railway stations on the Panskura-Haldia line.

== Eminent personalities ==
- Satish Chandra Samanta – Indian independence movement activist.
- Suryakant Tripathi 'Nirala' – one of the most significant poets of modern Hindi literature. He went to school at Mahishadal and was fluent in Bengali.

== See also ==
- Mahishadal (community development block)
- Mahisadal (Vidhan Sabha constituency)
