= Satish Samanta Halt railway station =

Railway station in West Bengal, India

Satish Samanta Halt

General information
- Location: Mahishadal-Geonkhali Road, Rangibasan, Mahishadal, Purba Medinipur district, West Bengal; India
- Coordinates: 22°11′35″N 87°59′24″E
- Elevation: 8 metres (26 ft)
- System: Kolkata Suburban Railway station
- Owner: Indian Railways
- Operator: South Eastern Railway zone
- Line: Panskura–Haldia branch line
- Platforms: 2
- Tracks: 2

Construction
- Structure type: Standard (on-ground station)

Other information
- Status: Functioning
- Station code: SSPH
- Division(s): Kharagpur

History
- Opened: 1968
- Electrified: 1974–76

Services
Preceding station	Kolkata Suburban Railway	Following station
Mahishadal towards Haldia	South Eastern Line Panskura–Haldia line	Keshabpur towards Howrah Junction
Route map
Location
- Location within West Bengal Location within India

Satish Samanta Halt railway station is a halt railway station on the Panskura–Haldia branch line in South Eastern Railway zone of Indian Railways. The railway station is situated beside Mahishadal-Geonkhali Road, Rangibasan at Mahishadal in Purba Medinipur district in the Indian state of West Bengal. This railway station is named after Bengali freedom fighter Satish Chandra Samanta.

== History ==
The Howrah–Kharagpur line was opened in 1865 and Panskura-Durgachak line was opened in 1968, at a time when Haldia Port was being constructed. It was subsequently extended to Haldia. The Panskura–Haldia line including Satish Samanta Halt railway station was electrified in 1974–76.
