= Durgachak =

- Neighbourhood in Haldia municipality
- Location in West Bengal, India
- Coordinates: 22°4′0″N 88°8′0″E
- Country: India
- State: West Bengal
- District: Purba Medinipur
- Elevation: 1 m (3.3 ft)

Languages
  - Official: Bengali, English
- Time zone: UTC+5:30 (IST)
- PIN: 721602

Durgachak is a town in Purba Medinipur district, West Bengal, India.

== Geography ==
Cities and towns in Haldia subdivision of Purba Medinipur district
M: municipal city/ town, CT: census town, R: rural/ urban centre, S: port
Owing to space constraints in the small map, the actual locations in a larger map may vary slightly

=== Location ===
It is located at an elevation of 1 m from MSL.

=== Police station ===
Durgachak police station has jurisdiction over Haldia CD Block. Durgachak police station covers an area of 44,21 km^{2} with a population of 71,067. Durgachak police station is located in Haldia municipality.

=== Urbanisation ===
79.19% of the population of Haldia subdivision live in the rural areas. Only 20.81% of the population live in the urban areas, and that is the highest proportion of urban population amongst the four subdivisions in Purba Medinipur district.

Note: The map alongside presents some of the notable locations in the subdivision. All places marked in the map are linked in the larger full screen map.

=== Places of interest ===
- Balughata
- Gopaljew Temple
- Shiva Mandir
- Township Riverside
- Patikhali Riverside

== Transport ==
Durgachak railway station and Durgachak Town railway station are situated on the Panskura-Haldia line.
