= Barda railway station =

Railway station in West Bengal, India

Barda

General information
- Location: Kukrahati Road, Chaitannyapur, Barda, Purba Medinipur district, West Bengal; India
- Coordinates: 22°09′10″N 88°05′15″E
- Elevation: 7 metres (23 ft)
- System: Kolkata Suburban Railway
- Owner: Indian Railways
- Operator: South Eastern Railway zone
- Line: Panskura–Haldia branch line
- Platforms: 3
- Tracks: 3

Construction
- Structure type: Standard (on-ground station)

Other information
- Status: Functioning
- Station code: BRDB
- Division(s): Kharagpur

History
- Opened: 1968
- Electrified: 1974–76

Services
| Preceding station | Kolkata Suburban Railway | Following station |
|---|---|---|
| Basulya Sutahata towards Haldia | South Eastern Line Panskura–Haldia line | Mahishadal towards Howrah Junction |
Route map
Location
- Location within West Bengal Location within India

Barda railway station is a railway station on the Panskura–Haldia branch line in South Eastern Railway zone of Indian Railways. The railway station is situated beside Kukrahati Road, Chaitannyapur at Barda in Purba Medinipur district in the Indian state of West Bengal.

== History ==
The Howrah–Kharagpur line was opened in 1865 and Panskura-Durgachak line was opened in 1968, at a time when Haldia Port was being constructed. It was subsequently extended to Haldia. The Panskura–Haldia line including Barda railway station was electrified in 1974–76.
