= Petroleum, Chemicals and Petrochemicals Investment Region =

In India, Petroleum, Chemicals and Petrochemicals Investment Regions (PCPIRs), originally known as Mega-Chemical Industrial Estates (MCIES) or chemical hubs, are special economic zones intended to facilitate production of petroleum and petrochemicals. The Government of India introduced the concept of chemical hubs in 2005. In 2007, the concept was reworked and expanded under the name PCPIRs. States with existing PCPIRs include Gujarat. In January 2022, public hearings regarding a proposed PCPIR in Paradeep, Odisha, drew controversy.

== Nandigram movement ==
In 2006, a proposal by the Haldia Development Authority for a chemical hub covering both Nandigram I and Nandigram II community development blocks, prompted concern and controversy among residents. The HDA intended to expropriate some 10,000 acres (4,000 ha) of land owned by farmers in the region. By 2007, protests by the affected farmers had snowballed into a major movement led by the Bhumi Uchhed Pratirodh Committee; clashes between the protestors and police were later known as the Nandigram violence. The location of the proposed chemical hub was later shifted to Nayachar and the proposal was eventually scrapped.
