= Nayachar =

Coordinates: 22.03°N 88.06°E

- Location within West Bengal

Geography
- Location: Bay of Bengal
- Archipelago: Sundarbans

Administration
- India
- State: West Bengal
- District: Purba Medinipur

Demographics
- Population: 2500

Nayachar is an island in the Hooghly River, off Haldia in Purba Medinipur in the Indian state of West Bengal. The island inhabited by few fishermen, has shot into the larger public view as the proposed site of the major chemical hub initiated by the erstwhile Left Front alliance led West Bengal Government. The hub was earlier proposed at Nandigram. Following the West Bengal State Assembly Election in 2011, the All India Trinamool Congress and Indian National Congress coalition under Mamata Banerjee led new West Bengal Government announced on 19 August 2011 that this project will be scrapped.

== Etymology ==
The Bengali word char means a strip of sandy land rising out of the bed of a river or the sea above water-level. Naya means new.

== Description ==
The island is approximately 64 km^{2} (25 sq mi). As of 2007, the island had approximately 2500 residents across 400 families. The island is officially classed as uninhabited by the government, so residents lack residential rights, addresses, and the ability to vote.

== History ==
In December 1987, Benoy Choudhury, then the West Bengali minister of land and land reforms, gave the island to the state's fisheries department for redevelopment. In 2000, the government set up 13 fishing cooperatives on the island, providing assistance by digging 315 ponds for farming of tiger prawns. In 2007, the government cancelled the contracts for the cooperatives, as they had not been profitable. This left the farmers working illegally.

=== Proposed chemical hub ===
In 2006, it was proposed that a large special economic zone called a chemical hub would be set up in Nandigram, West Bengal. The proposal led to protests in the region, which erupted into the Nandigram violence in 2007; the project was shelved in March 2007 as a result. On 3 September 2007, chief minister Buddhadeb Bhattacharjee stated that the government proposed to relocate the project to Nayachar, which was state-owned and technically uninhabited. As a result, the project would neither entail land acquisition nor require significant population displacement.

The chemical hub would have been a joint venture between West Bengal Industrial Development Corporation (WBIDC) and New Kolkata International Development, a group comprising three companies including the Salim Group of Indonesia. Indian Oil Corporation would have been an anchor investor.

The project encountered difficulties. Nayachar comes under the Coastal Regulation Zone where industries are not permitted for environmental reasons. A bridge would have been required to link the island to Haldia.

The state fisheries department had sought the opinion of the Geological Survey of India regarding the island. GSI had said that the soft land of the island was vulnerable to earthquakes, cyclones and tsunamis, although it had not completed a site-specific survey, and geological data in the area had last been updated in 1985. Additionally, the fisheries department demanded Rs 220 million from the WBIDC for cancelling its work on Nayachar, to repay a loan it had taken from the Government of India for the purpose.

State Industries Minister Nirupam Sen stated that "The technology to consolidate the soil on such islands is available. They have done it on an island in Singapore," referring to the Salim Group's work on Jurong Island in Singapore. On 14 September 2007, it was reported that Geological Survey of India would take at least six months to complete a detailed geological study in Nayachar after the Government of West Bengal approved a geo-technical survey.

In 2011, the project was officially scrapped.
