= Hincha Gerya =

- Census Town
- Location in West Bengal, India Hincha Gerya (India)
- Coordinates: 22.0603°N 87.7995°E
- Country: India
- State: West Bengal
- District: Purba Medinipur

Area
  - Total: 2.0266 km^{2} (0.7825 sq mi)

Population (2011)
  - Total: 4,958
  - Density: 2,446/km^{2} (6,336/sq mi)

Languages
  - Official: Bengali, English
- Time zone: UTC+5:30 (IST)
- Lok Sabha constituency: Kanthi
- Vidhan Sabha constituency: Bhagabanpur
- Website: purbamedinipur.gov.in

Hincha Gerya is a census town in Bhagabanpur I CD block in Egra subdivision of Purba Medinipur district in the state of West Bengal, India.

== Geography ==
Cities and towns in Egra subdivision of Purba Medinipur district
M: municipal city/ town, CT: census town, R: rural/ urban centre, H: historical/ religious centre.
Owing to space constraints in the small map, the actual locations in a larger map may vary slightly

=== Location ===
Hincha Gerya is located at 22.0603°N 87.7995°E.

=== Urbanisation ===
96.96% of the population of Egra subdivision live in the rural areas. Only 3.04% of the population live in the urban areas, and that is the lowest proportion of urban population amongst the four subdivisions in Purba Medinipur district.

Note: The map alongside presents some of the notable locations in the subdivision. All places marked in the map are linked in the larger full screen map.

== Demographics ==
As per 2011 Census of India Hincha Gerya had a total population of 4,958 of which 2,464 (50%) were males and 2,394 (48%) were females. Population below 6 years was 771. The total number of literates in Hincha Gerya was 3,478 (83.07% of the population over 6 years).

== Infrastructure ==
As per the District Census Handbook 2011, Hincha Gerya covered an area of 2.0266 km^{2}. Deshapran railway station is located 3 km away and bus routes at Kismat Bajkul 3 km away. Amongst the civic amenities it had 450 domestic electric connections. Amongst the medical facilities it had a hospital 9 km away. Amongst the educational facilities it had were 2 primary schools. The nearest middle school was at Narayandai 1.5 km away. The secondary school and senior secondary school were at Kajlagarh 3 km away. The nearest degree college was at Kismat Bajkul 3 km away.

== Transport ==
Local roads link Hincha Gerya to Egra-Bajkul Road.

== Education ==
Bajkul Milani Mahavidyalaya, established at Tethi Bari mouza, PO Kismat Bajkul, in 1964, is located close by.

== Healthcare ==
Bhagabanpur Rural Hospital at Bhagabanpur (with 30 beds), the main medical facility in Bhagabanpur I CD block, is located not very far away.
