= Benudia =

- Census Town
- Location in West Bengal, India Benudia (India)
- Coordinates: 22.0974°N 87.7478°E
- Country: India
- State: West Bengal
- District: Purba Medinipur

Area
  - Total: 2.2824 km^{2} (0.8812 sq mi)

Population (2011)
  - Total: 6,797
  - Density: 2,978/km^{2} (7,713/sq mi)

Languages
  - Official: Bengali, English
- Time zone: UTC+5:30 (IST)
- Lok Sabha constituency: Kanthi
- Vidhan Sabha constituency: Chandipur
- Website: purbamedinipur.gov.in

Benudia is a census town in Bhagabanpur I CD block in Egra subdivision of Purba Medinipur district in the state of West Bengal, India.

== Geography ==
Cities and towns in Egra subdivision of Purba Medinipur district
M: municipal city/ town, CT: census town, R: rural/ urban centre, H: historical/ religious centre.
Owing to space constraints in the small map, the actual locations in a larger map may vary slightly

=== Location ===
Benudia is located at 22.0974°N 87.7478°E.

=== Urbanisation ===
96.96% of the population of Egra subdivision live in the rural areas. Only 3.04% of the population live in the urban areas, and that is the lowest proportion of urban population amongst the four subdivisions in Purba Medinipur district.

Note: The map alongside presents some of the notable locations in the subdivision. All places marked in the map are linked in the larger full screen map.

== Demographics ==
As per 2011 Census of India Benudia had a total population of 6,797 of which 3,509 (52%) were males and 3,288 (48%) were females. Population below 6 years was 940. The total number of literates in Benudia was 4,874 (83.22% of the population over 6 years).

== Infrastructure ==
As per the District Census Handbook 2011, Benudia covered an area of 2.2824 km^{2}. It had the facility of a railway station at Deshapran 13 km away and bus routes in the town. Amongst the civic amenities it had 23 road lighting points and 764 domestic electric connections. Amongst the educational facilities it had were 4 primary schools, 1 middle school and 1 secondary school. The nearest senior secondary school is at Bhagabanpur 1 km away. The nearest degree college was at Kismat Bajkul 3 km away. Amongst the recreational and cultural facilities, a cinema theatre was there in the town.

== Transport ==
Benudia is on the Egra-Bajkul Road.

== Education ==
The nearest degree college, Bajkul Milani Mahavidyalaya was established at Tethi Bari mouza, PO Kismat Bajkul, in 1964.

The nearest higher secondary school, Bhagwanpur High School at Bhagabanpur was established in 1923.

== Healthcare ==
Bhagabanpur Rural Hospital, the main medical facility in Bhagabanpur I CD block, is located nearby.

== Notable people ==
Dr Sheikh Taslim Ali, Professor (Asst.) of Epidemiology and Biostatistics, School of Public Health, The University of Hong Kong; a Commonwealth scholar at Imperial College London, the United Kingdom for his doctoral program.
