= Bhagabanpur =

- Village
- Location in West Bengal, India Bhagabanpur (India)
- Coordinates: 22.0997°N 87.7512°E
- Country: India
- State: West Bengal
- District: Purba Medinipur

Population (2011)
  - Total: 2,566

Languages
  - Official: Bengali, English
- Time zone: UTC+5:30 (IST)
- PIN: 721601 (Bhagwanpur)
- Telephone/STD code: 03228
- Lok Sabha constituency: Kanthi
- Vidhan Sabha constituency: Bhagabanpur
- Website: purbamedinipur.gov.in

Bhagabanpur is a village, in Bhagabanpur I CD block in Egra subdivision of Purba Medinipur district in the state of West Bengal, India.

== Geography ==
Cities and towns in Egra subdivision of Purba Medinipur district
M: municipal city/ town, CT: census town, R: rural/ urban centre, H: historical/ religious centre.
Owing to space constraints in the small map, the actual locations in a larger map may vary slightly

=== Location ===
Bhagabanpur is located at 22.0997°N 87.7512°E.

=== Police station ===
Bhagabanpur police station has jurisdiction over Bhagabanpur I CD block. Bhagabanpur police station covers an area of 179.95 km^{2} with a population of 2,288.68. The police station is located at Bhagabanpur.

=== Urbanisation ===
96.96% of the population of Egra subdivision live in the rural areas. Its 3.04% urban population constitutes the lowest proportion of urban population amongst the four subdivisions in Purba Medinipur district.

Note: The map alongside presents some of the notable locations in the subdivision. All places marked in the map are linked in the larger full screen map.

== Demographics ==
As per 2011 Census of India Bhagabanpur had a total population of 2,566 of which 1,294 (50%) were males and 1,272 (50%) were females. Population below 6 years was 348. The total number of literates in Bhagabanpur was 1,968 (88.73% of the population over 6 years).

== Transport ==
The road from Bazkul to Patashpur passes through Bhagabanpur. At Patashpur, one road leads to Egra on SH 5, and another to Debra on NH 16.

== Education ==
Bhagwanpur High School at Bhagabanpur is a Bengali-medium higher secondary school established in 1923.

The nearest degree college, Bajkul Milani Mahavidyalaya, was established at Tethi Bari mouza, PO Kismat Bajkul, in 1964.

== Culture ==
David J. McCutchion mentions the Kali temple as a 19th-century at-chala where a tiny but a fully developed upper tower is perched on what is basically a char-chala design.

== Dakhsina Kali Temple picture gallery ==
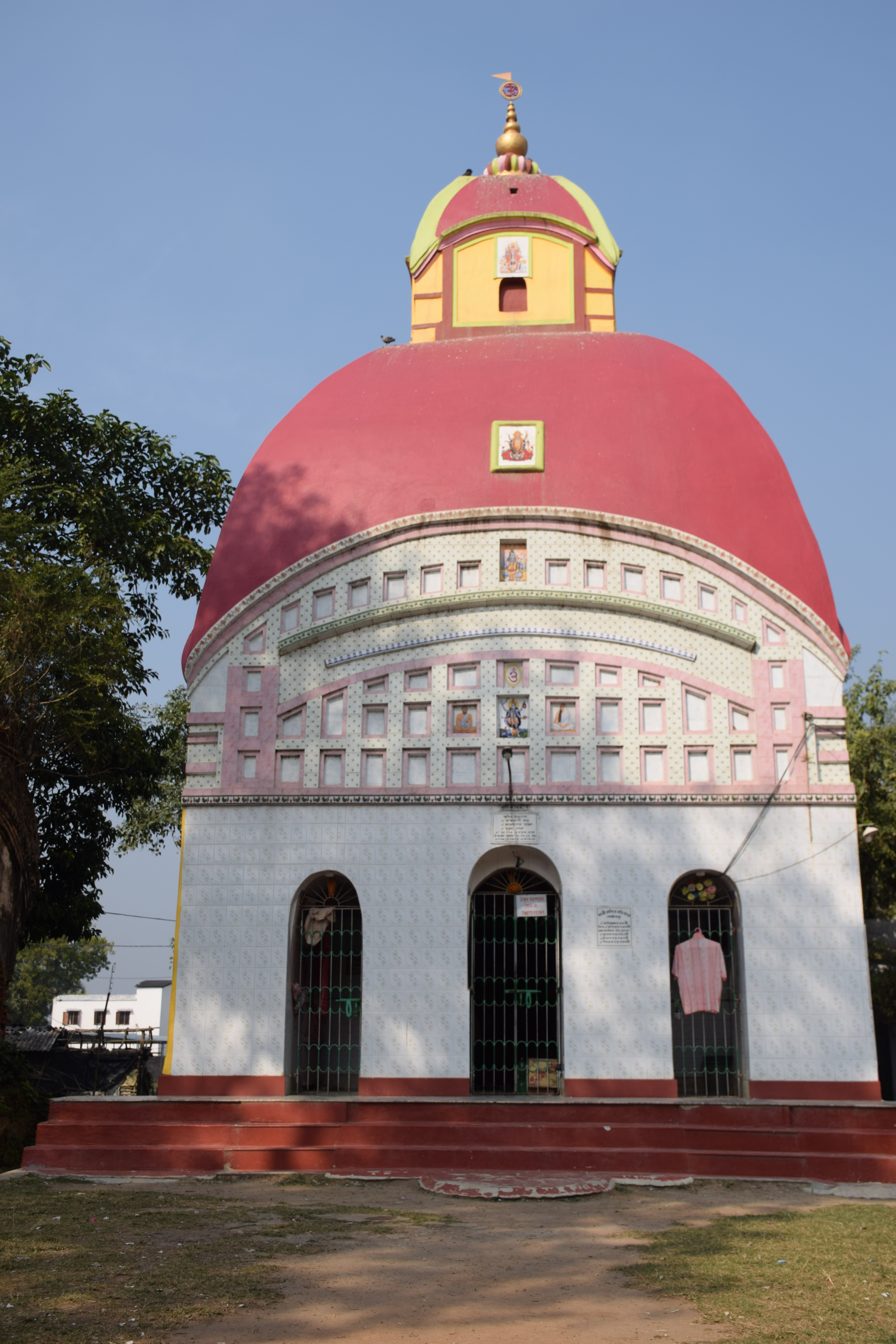
The main at-chala Dakhsina Kali temple

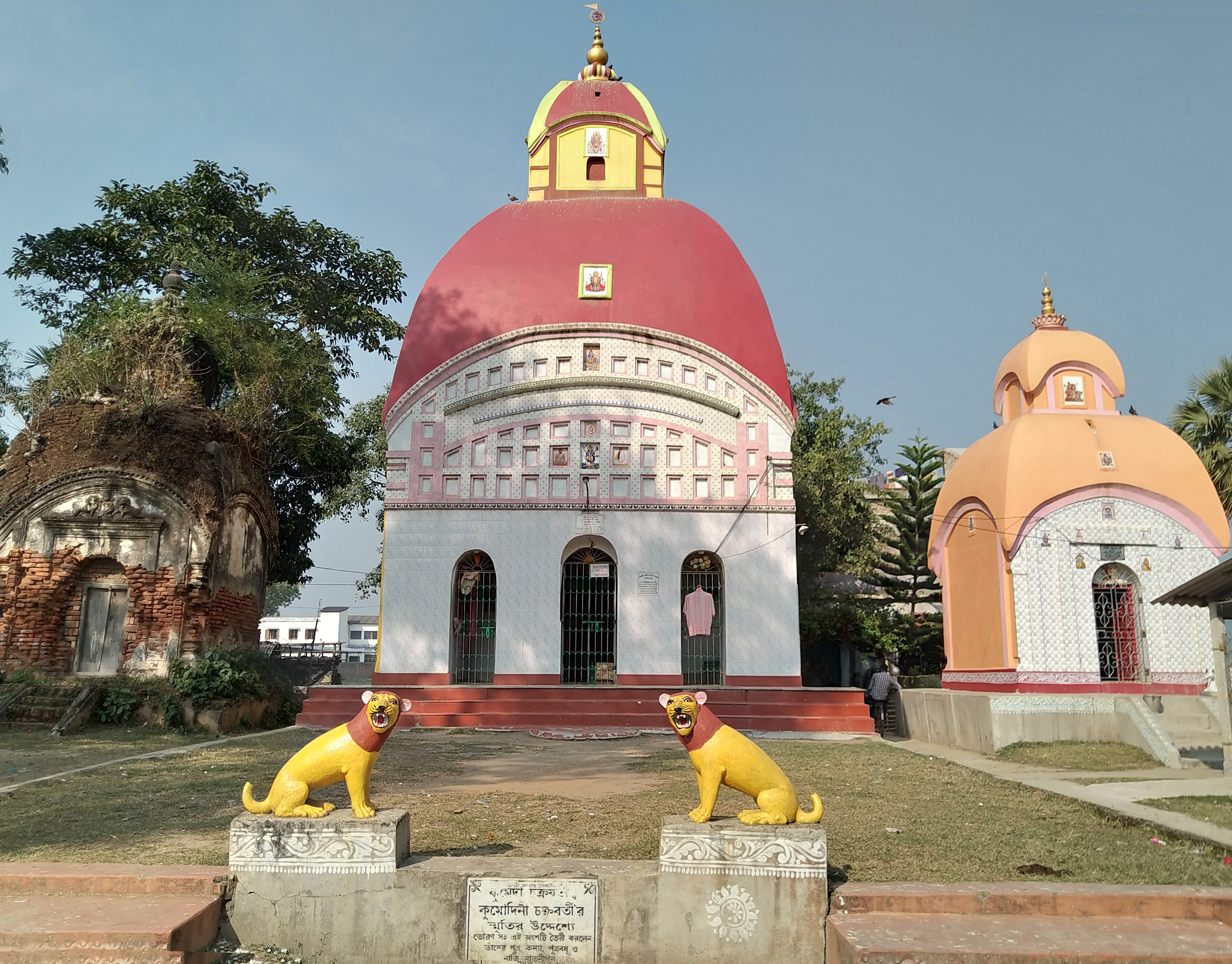
The main temple with two other temples

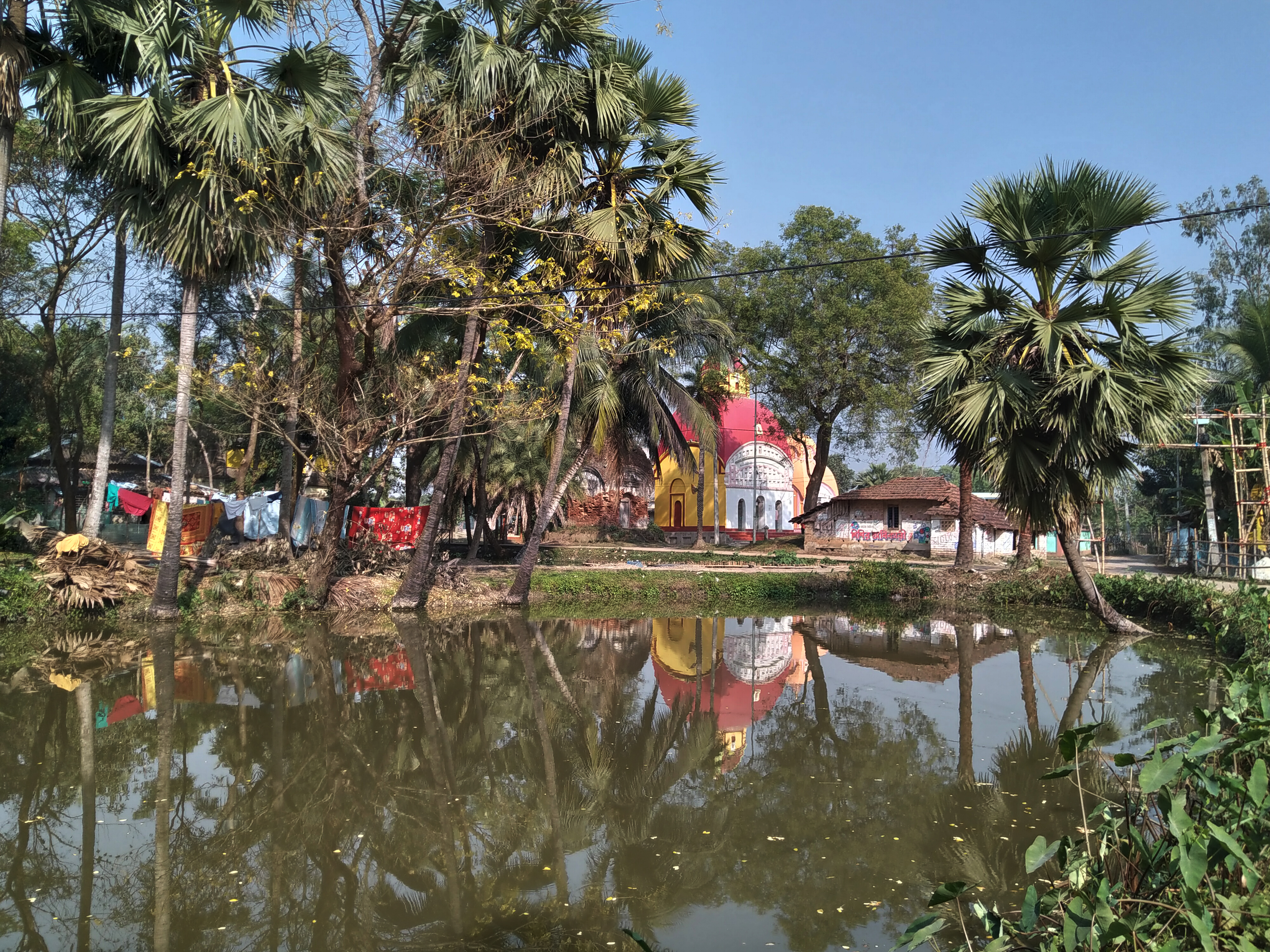
The temples from across the pond

== Healthcare ==
Bhagabanpur Rural Hospital at Bhagabanpur (with 30 beds) is the main medical facility in Bhagabanpur I CD block. There are primary health centres at Bibhisanpur (with 10 beds), Kajlagarh (with 6 beds) and Seulipur, PO Paschimbarh (with 6 beds).

== Notable people ==
Dr Sheikh Taslim Ali, Professor (Asst.) of Epidemiology and Biostatistics, School of Public Health, The University of Hong Kong; a Commonwealth scholar at Imperial College London, the United Kingdom for his doctoral program.
