= Deshapran railway station =

Railway station in West Bengal, India

Deshapran
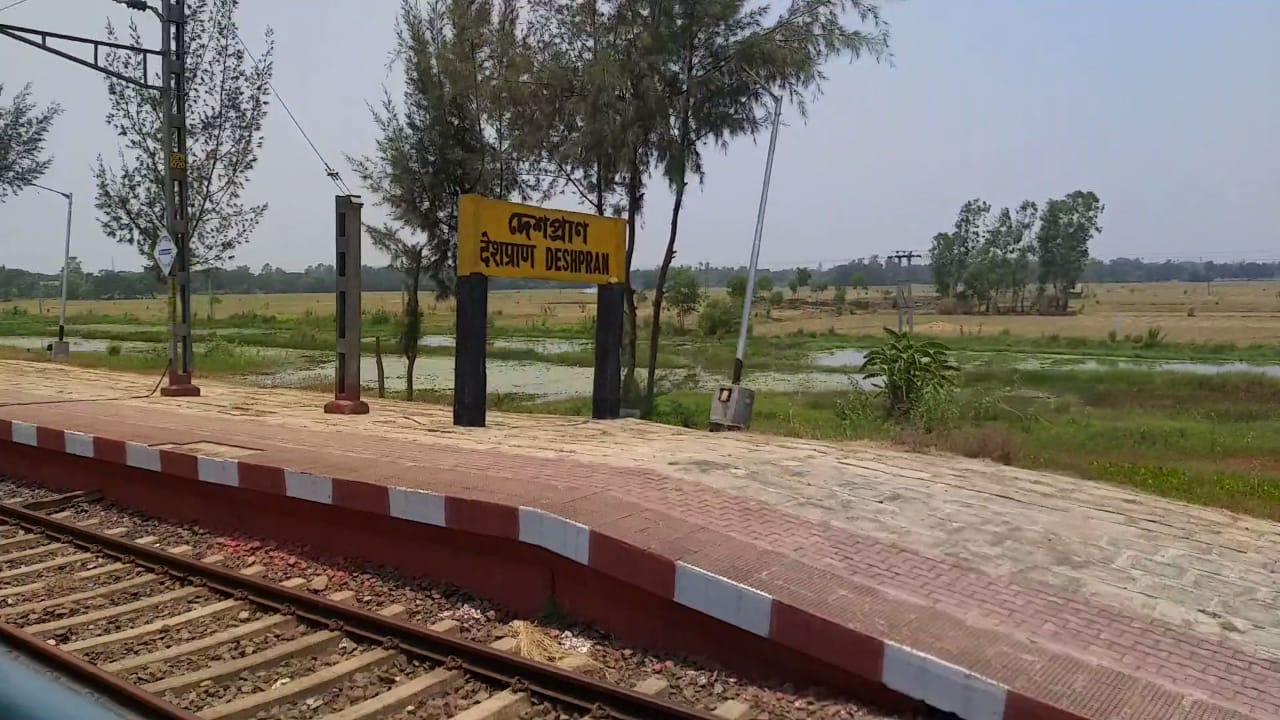

General information
- Location: Contai–Nandakumar Road, Bajkul, Purba Medinipur district, West Bengal; India
- Coordinates: 22°01′47″N 87°49′04″E
- Elevation: 5 metres (16 ft)
- System: Kolkata Suburban Railway station
- Owner: Indian Railways
- Operator: South Eastern Railway
- Line: Tamluk–Digha branch line
- Platforms: 2
- Tracks: 3

Construction
- Structure type: Standard (on-ground station)
- Parking: No

Other information
- Status: Functioning
- Station code: DSPN
- Zone(s): Kolkata Suburban Railway
- Division(s): Kharagpur

History
- Opened: 2004
- Closed: present
- Electrified: 2012–13

Services
Preceding station	Kolkata Suburban Railway	Following station
Henria towards Digha	South Eastern Line Tamluk–Digha branch line	Lavan Satyagrah Smarak towards Howrah Junction
Route map
Location
- Location within West Bengal Location within India

Deshapran railway station is a railway station on the Tamluk–Digha branch line of South Eastern Railway zone of Indian Railways. The railway station is situated beside Contai–Nandakumar Road, at Bajkul in Purba Medinipur district in the Indian state of West Bengal. This railway station is named after Bengali nationalist Deshapran Birendranath Sasmal. It serves Bajkul, Kismat Bajkul, Kajlagarh, Tethi Bari, Hincha Gerya, Kalaberia and other places in Bhagabanpur I CD block.

== History ==
The Tamluk–Digha line was sanctioned in 1984–85 Railway Budget at an estimated cost of around Rs 74 crore. Finally this line was opened in 2004. This track including Deshapran railway station was electrified in 2012–13.
