= Erashal =

- Census Town
- Location in West Bengal, India Erashal (India)
- Coordinates: 22.0862°N 87.8722°E
- Country: India
- State: West Bengal
- District: Purba Medinipur

Area
  - Total: 3.7505 km^{2} (1.4481 sq mi)

Population (2011)
  - Total: 5,332
  - Density: 1,422/km^{2} (3,682/sq mi)

Languages
  - Official: Bengali, English
- Time zone: UTC+5:30 (IST)
- Lok Sabha constituency: Kanthi
- Vidhan Sabha constituency: Chandipur
- Website: purbamedinipur.gov.in

Erashal is a census town in Chandipur CD block in Tamluk subdivision of Purba Medinipur district in the state of West Bengal, India.

== Geography ==
Cities and towns in Tamluk subdivision of Purba Medinipur district
M: municipal city/ town, CT: census town, R: rural/ urban centre, H: historical/ religious centre
Owing to space constraints in the small map, the actual locations in a larger map may vary slightly

=== Location ===
Erashal is located at 22.0862°N 87.8722°E.

=== Urbanisation ===
94.08% of the population of Tamluk subdivision live in the rural areas. Only 5.92% of the population live in the urban areas, and that is the second lowest proportion of urban population amongst the four subdivisions in Purba Medinipur district, just above Egra subdivision.

Note: The map alongside presents some of the notable locations in the subdivision. All places marked in the map are linked in the larger full screen map.

== Demographics ==
As per 2011 Census of India Erashal had a total population of 5,332 of which 2,641 (50%) were males and 2,691 (50%) were females. Population below 6 years was 601. The total number of literates in Erashal was 4,153 (87.78% of the population over 6 years).

== Infrastructure ==
As per the District Census Handbook 2011, Erashal covered an area of 3.7505 km^{2}. It had the facility of a railway station at Kamdapasara 3 km away. Amongst the civic amenities it had 25 road lighting points and 458 domestic electric connections. Amongst the educational facilities it had were 4 primary schools, 1 secondary school and 1 senior secondary school. The nearest degree college was at Kismat Bajkul 6 km away.

== Transport ==
Erashal is on Chandipur-Nandigram Road.

== Healthcare ==
Erashal Rural Hospital at Erashal, PO Math Chandipur (with 30 beds) is the main medical facility in Chandipur CD block. There are primary health centres at Gokhuri, PO Majnaberia (with 2 beds) and Baraghuni (with 10 beds).
