= Paikbheri =

Paikbheri Paik Bheri
- Village
- Location in West Bengal, India Paikbheri (India)
- Coordinates: 22.1025°N 87.7234°E
- Country: India
- State: West Bengal
- District: Purba Medinipur

Population (2011)
  - Total: 1,124

Languages
  - Official: Bengali, English
- Time zone: UTC+5:30 (IST)
- PIN: 721601
- Telephone/STD code: 03228
- Lok Sabha constituency: Kanthi
- Vidhan Sabha constituency: Bhagabanpur
- Website: purbamedinipur.gov.in

Paikbheri (also written as Paik Bheri) is a village in the Bhagabanpur I CD block in the Egra subdivision of the Purba Medinipur district in the state of West Bengal, India.

== Geography ==
Cities and towns in Egra subdivision of Purba Medinipur district
M: municipal city/ town, CT: census town, R: rural/ urban centre. H: historical/ religious centre.
Owing to space constraints in the small map, the actual locations in a larger map may vary slightly

=== Location ===
Paikbheri is located at 22.1025°N 87.7234°E.

=== Urbanisation ===
96.96% of the population of Egra subdivision live in the rural areas. Only 3.04% of the population live in the urban areas, and that is the lowest proportion of urban population amongst the four subdivisions in Purba Medinipur district.

Note: The map alongside presents some of the notable locations in the subdivision. All places marked in the map are linked in the larger full screen map.

== Demographics ==
According to the 2011 Census of India, Paikbheri had a total population of 1,124, of which 577 (51%) were males and 547 (49%) were females. There were 985 persons in the age range of 0–6 years. The total number of literate persons in Paikbheri was 910 (92.39% of the population over 6 years).

== Culture ==
David J. McCutchion mentions the Shyama Sundara temple as a plain flat-roofed structure with pancha-ratna superstructure measuring 28’9" x 25’7" and possibly built in 1730. There is a char-chala porch measuring 19’4" sq plus 17’9" sq attached to a deul.

== Paikbheri picture gallery ==
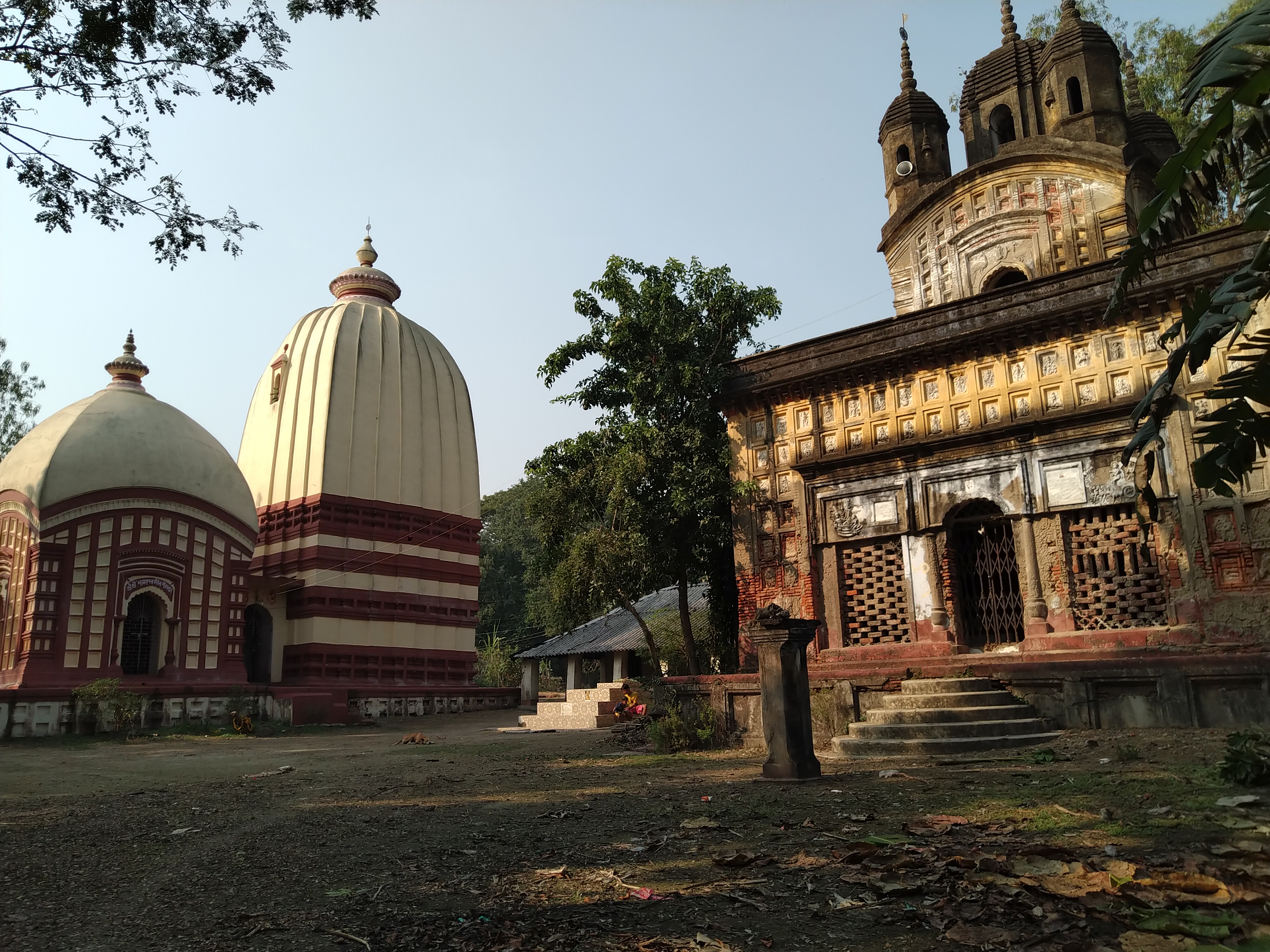
Shyma Sundara deul and flat-roofed temple

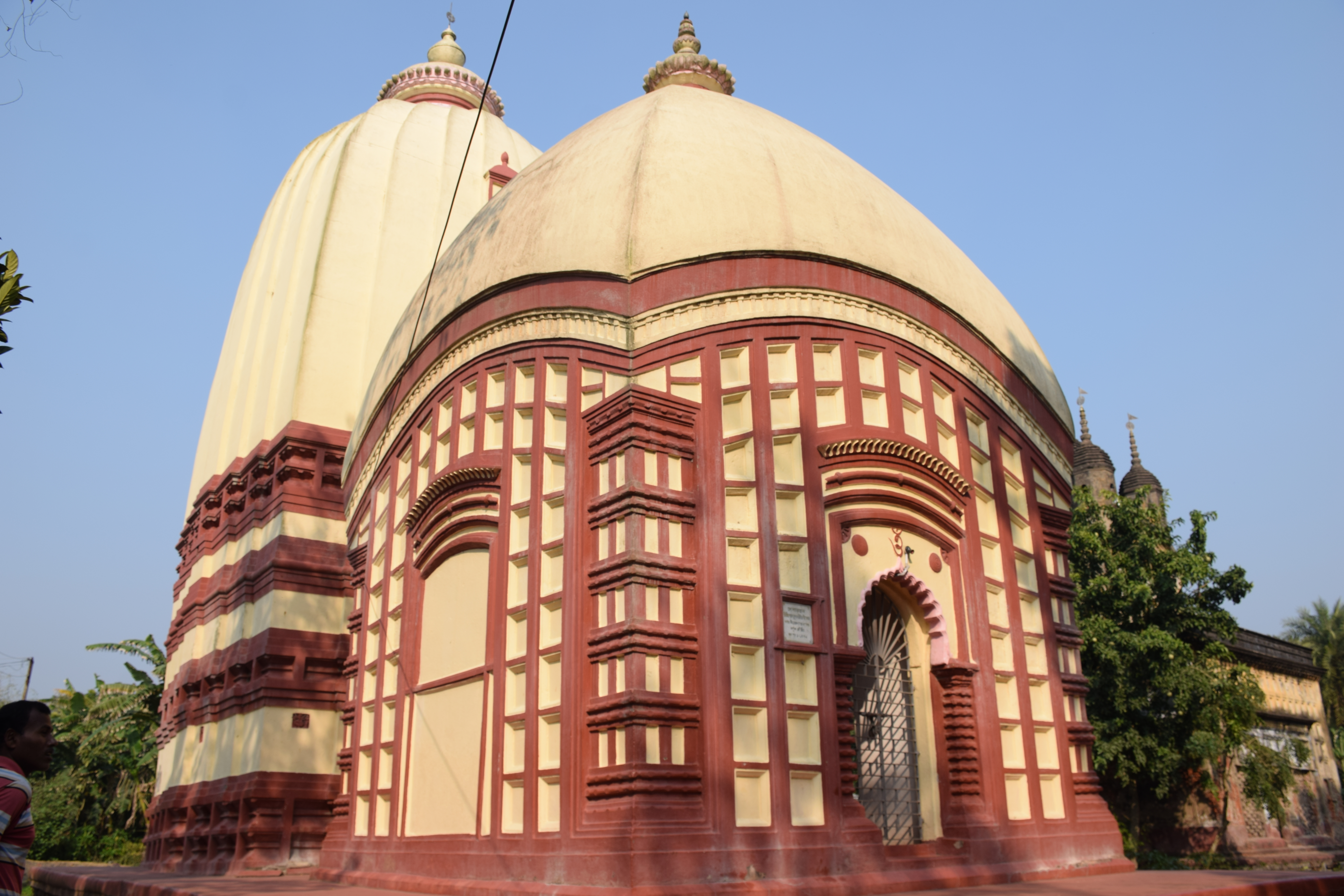
Shyama Sundara deul with char-chala porch in front

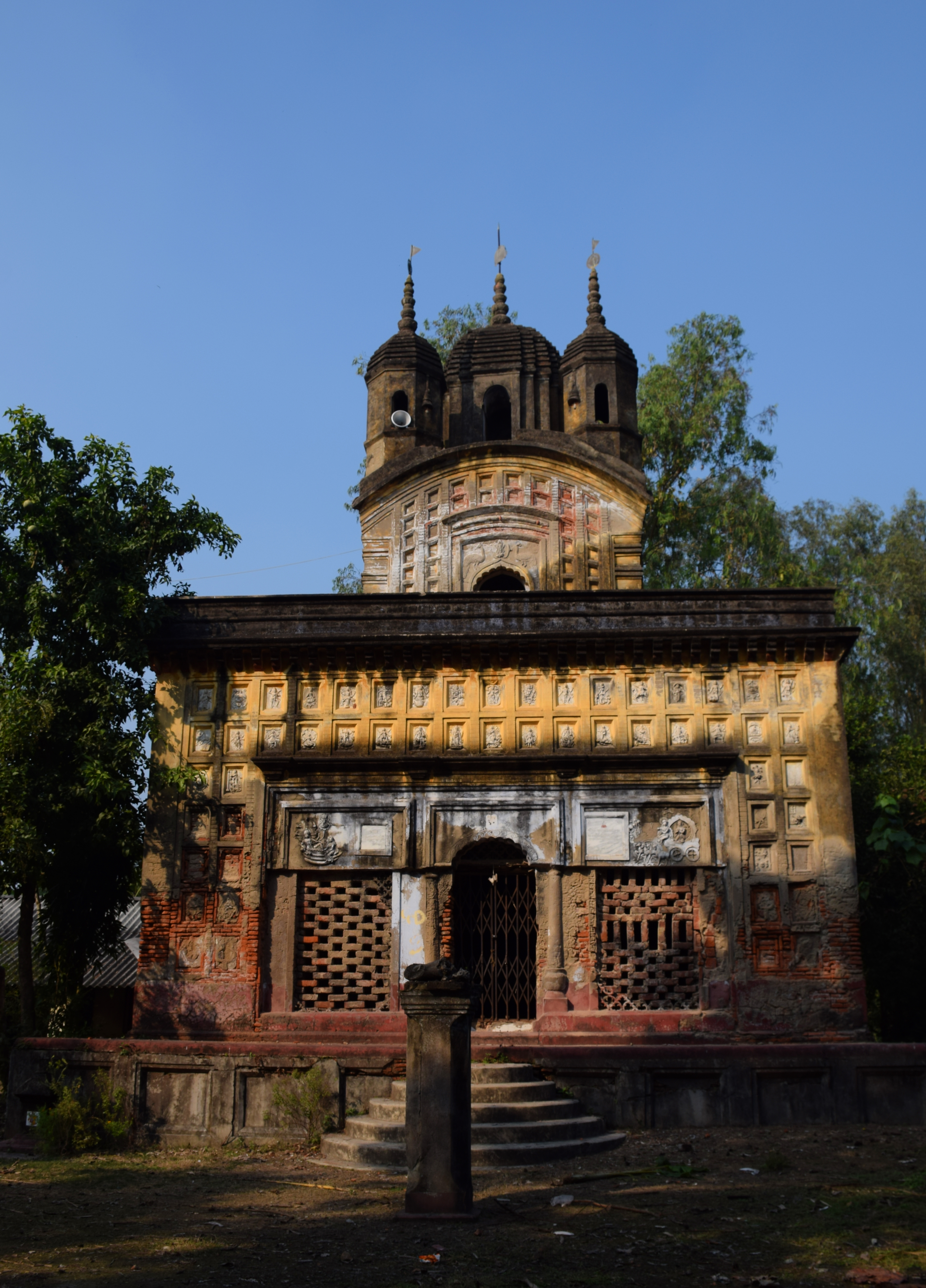
Shyama Sundara flat-roofed temple with pancha-ratna
