= Kalaberia =

- Village
- Location in West Bengal, India Kalaberia (India)
- Coordinates: 22.0615°N 87.7832°E
- Country: India
- State: West Bengal
- District: Purba Medinipur

Population (2011)
  - Total: 3,276

Languages
  - Official: Bengali, English
- Time zone: UTC+5:30 (IST)
- PIN: 721626
- Lok Sabha constituency: Kanthi
- Vidhan Sabha constituency: Bhagabanpur
- Website: purbamedinipur.gov.in

Kalaberia is a village in Bhagabanpur I CD block in Egra subdivision of Purba Medinipur district, West Bengal, India. It comes under the control of Bhagwanpur police station.

== Demographics ==
As per 2011 Census of India Kalaberia had a total population of 3,276 of which 1,695 (52%) were males and 1,581 (48%) were females. Population below 6 years was 353. The total number of literates in Kalaberia was 2,756 (94.29% of the population over 6 years).

== Economy ==
There are many banks: State Bank, Punjab Bank, BGVB etc.

== Education ==
The education system is well developed. Many nursery and government primary schools are there: Kalaberia Old Primary School, Mahatma Gandhi Sishu Siksha Sadan. Secondary education is represented by Kalaberia Prasanna Kumar High School and Charabath Girls High School.

== Culture ==
Many Hindu temples are located here such as the Lord Shiba Temple, Maa Shitala Mandir and others.
