= Kotbar =

Kotbar Kotebarh
- Census Town
- Location in West Bengal, India Kotbar (India)
- Coordinates: 22.1252°N 87.8120°E
- Country: India
- State: West Bengal
- District: Purba Medinipur

Area
  - Total: 1.143 km^{2} (0.441 sq mi)

Population (2011)
  - Total: 6,083
  - Density: 5,322/km^{2} (13,780/sq mi)

Languages
  - Official: Bengali, English
- Time zone: UTC+5:30 (IST)
- PIN: 721633 (Kotebarh)
- Lok Sabha constituency: Kanthi
- Vidhan Sabha constituency: Chandipur
- Website: purbamedinipur.gov.in

Kotbar (also spelled Kotebarh) is a census town in Chandipur CD block in Tamluk subdivision of Purba Medinipur district in the state of West Bengal, India.

== Geography ==
Cities and towns in Tamluk subdivision of Purba Medinipur district
M: municipal city/ town, CT: census town, R: rural/ urban centre, H: historical/ religious centre
Owing to space constraints in the small map, the actual locations in a larger map may vary slightly

=== Location ===
Kotbar is located at 22.1252°N 87.8120°E.

=== Urbanisation ===
94.08% of the population of Tamluk subdivision live in the rural areas. Only 5.92% of the population live in the urban areas, and that is the second lowest proportion of urban population amongst the four subdivisions in Purba Medinipur district, just above Egra subdivision.

Note: The map alongside presents some of the notable locations in the subdivision. All places marked in the map are linked in the larger full screen map.

== Demographics ==
As per 2011 Census of India Kotbar had a total population of 6,083 of which 3,140 (52%) were males and 2,943 (48%) were females. Population below 6 years was 916. The total number of literates in Kotbar was 4,371 (84.59% of the population over 6 years).

== Infrastructure ==
As per the District Census Handbook 2011, Kotbar covered an area of 1.143 km^{2}. Amongst the civic amenities it had 478 domestic electric connections. Amongst the medical facilities it had a hospital 2 km away. Amongst the educational facilities it had were 3 primary schools. The nearest middle school and secondary school were at Attatar 1 km away. The nearest senior secondary school was at Gikhuri 2 km away. The nearest degree college was at Nandakumar 15 km away.

== Transport ==
Kotabar is on Kayal Chak-Dhaka Chora Road.
