= Gangadharbar =

- Village
- Location in West Bengal, India Gangadharbar (India)
- Coordinates: 21.8914°N 87.6406°E
- Country: India
- State: West Bengal
- District: Purba Medinipur

Population (2011)
  - Total: 1,392

Languages
  - Official: Bengali, English
- Time zone: UTC+5:30 (IST)
- PIN: 721422 (Pirijkhanbar)
- Telephone/STD code: 03228
- Lok Sabha constituency: Medinipur
- Vidhan Sabha constituency: Egra
- Website: purbamedinipur.gov.in

Gangadharbar is a village in Egra II CD block in Egra subdivision of Purba Medinipur district in the state of West Bengal, India.

== Geography ==
Cities and towns in Egra subdivision of Purba Medinipur district
M: municipal city/ town, CT: census town, R: rural/ urban centre, H: historical/ religious centre.
Owing to space constraints in the small map, the actual locations in a larger map may vary slightly

=== Location ===
Gangadharbar is located at 21.8914°N 87.6406°E .

=== Urbanisation ===
96.96% of the population of Egra subdivision live in the rural areas. Only 3.04% of the population live in the urban areas, and that is the lowest proportion of urban population amongst the four subdivisions in Purba Medinipur district.

Note: The map alongside presents some of the notable locations in the subdivision. All places marked in the map are linked in the larger full screen map.

== Demographics ==
As per 2011 Census of India Gangadharbar had a total population of 1,392 of which 709 (51%) were males and 683 (49%) were females. Population below 6 years was 164. The total number of literates in Gangadharbar was 1,101 (89.66% of the population over 6 years).

== Transport ==
Gangadharbar is on the Pratapdighi-Jinandapur Road.

== Healthcare ==
Gangadharbar Rural Hospital at Gangadharbar, PO Pirijkhanbar (with 30 beds) is the main medical facility in Egra II CD block. There are primary health centres at Paniparul (with 10 beds), Betamaheshpur, PO Maheshpur (with 10 beds) and Shyampur, PO Bidurpur (with 2 beds).
