= Madhabpur, Purba Medinipur =

Madhabpur
- Village
- Location in West Bengal, India Madhabpur (India)
- Coordinates: 21°52′32.2″N 87°35′04.9″E
- Country: India
- State: West Bengal
- District: Purba Medinipur

Population (2011)
  - Total: 669

Languages
  - Official: Bengali, English
- Time zone: UTC+5:30 (IST)
- Lok Sabha constituency: Kanthi
- Vidhan Sabha constituency: Egra
- Website: purbamedinipur.gov.in

Madhabpur is a village, in Egra II CD block in Egra subdivision of Purba Medinipur district in the state of West Bengal, India.

== Geography ==
Cities and towns in Egra subdivision of Purba Medinipur district
M: municipal city/ town, CT: census town, R: rural/ urban centre, H: historical/ religious centre.
Owing to space constraints in the small map, the actual locations in a larger map may vary slightly

=== Location ===
Madhabpur is located at 21°52′32.2″N 87°35′04.9″E.

=== CD block HQ ===
The headquarters of Egra II CD block are located at Madhabpur.

=== Urbanisation ===
96.96% of the population of Egra subdivision live in the rural areas. Only 3.04% of the population live in the urban areas, and that is the lowest proportion of urban population amongst the four subdivisions in Purba Medinipur district.

Note: The map alongside presents some of the notable locations in the subdivision. All places marked in the map are linked in the larger full screen map.

== Demographics ==
As per 2011 Census of India Madhabpur had a total population of 669 of which 333 (50%) were males and 336 (50%) were females. Population below 6 years was 63. The total number of literates in Madhabpur was 568 (93.73% of the population over 6 years).

== Transport ==
A short stretch of a local road links Madhabpur to State Highway 5.
