= Patashpur II =

- Community development block
- Coordinates: 21.96667°N 87.63335°E
- Country: India
- State: West Bengal
- District: Purba Medinipur
- Headquarters: Pratapdighi

Government
  - Type: Community development block

Area
  - Total: 191.74 km^{2} (74.03 sq mi)
- Elevation: 4 m (13 ft)

Population (2011)
  - Total: 175,056
  - Density: 912.99/km^{2} (2,364.6/sq mi)

Languages
  - Official: Bengali, English
- Time zone: UTC+5:30 (IST)
- PIN: 721439 (Patashpur); 721456 (Argoal)
- ISO 3166 code: IN-WB
- Vehicle registration: WB-29, WB-30, WB-31, WB-32, WB-33
- Literacy: 86.50%
- Lok Sabha constituency: Kanthi
- Vidhan Sabha constituency: Patashpur, Bhagabanpur
- Website: purbamedinipur.gov.in

Patashpur II (also spelled as Potashpur) is a community development block that forms an administrative division in Egra subdivision of Purba Medinipur district in the Indian state of West Bengal.The headquarters in Pratapdighi.

== Geography ==
Purba Medinipur district is part of the lower Indo-Gangetic Plain and Eastern coastal plains. Topographically, the district can be divided into two parts – (a) almost entirely flat plains on the west, east and north, (b) the coastal plains on the south. The vast expanse of land is formed of alluvium and is composed of younger and coastal alluvial. The elevation of the district is within 10 metres above mean sea level. The district has a long coastline of 65.5 km along its southern and south eastern boundary. Five coastal CD Blocks, namely, Khejuri II, Contai II (Deshapran), Contai I, Ramnagar I and II, are occasionally affected by cyclones and tornadoes. Tidal floods are quite regular in these five CD Blocks. Normally floods occur in 21 of the 25 CD Blocks in the district. The major rivers are Haldi, Rupnarayan, Rasulpur, Bagui and Keleghai, flowing in north to south or south-east direction. River water is an important source of irrigation. The district has a low 899 hectare forest cover, which is 0.02% of its geographical area.

Argoal, a constituent panchayat of Patashpur II block, is located at 21°58′00″N 87°38′00″E.

Patashpur II CD Block is bounded by Patashpur I CD Block in the north, Bhagabanpur II CD Block in the east, Egra I and Egra II CD Blocks in the south and Dantan II CD Block, in Paschim Medinipur district, in the west.

It is located 58 km from Tamluk, the district headquarters.

Patashpur II CD Block has an area of 191.74 km^{2}. It has 1 panchayat samity, 7 gram panchayats, 124 gram sansads (village councils), 151 mouzas and 144 inhabited villages. Patashpur police station serves this block.

Gram panchayats of Patashpur II block/ panchayat samiti are: Argoal, Khar, Mathura, Panchet, Patashpur, South Khanda and Srirampur.

== Demographics ==
=== Population ===
As per 2011 Census of India Potashpur II CD Block had a total population of 175,056, all of which were rural. There were 90,319 (52%) males and 84,737 (48%) females. Population below 6 years was 20,438. Scheduled Castes numbered 21,077 (12.04%) and Scheduled Tribes numbered 1,388 (o.79%).

As per 2001 census, Patashpur II block had a total population of 154,719, out of which 79,360 were males and 75,359 were females. Patashpur II block registered a population growth of 16.58 per cent during the 1991-2001 decade. Decadal growth for the combined Midnapore district was 14.87 per cent. Decadal growth in West Bengal was 17.84 per cent.

Large villages (with 4,000+ population) in Patashpur II CD Block (2011 census figures in brackets): Kasbapatapur (5,853), Kharat Katbar (5,961), Khar (6,654), Panchet (4,106) and Balgobindapur (4,368).

Other villages in Patashpur II CD Block (2011 census figures in brackets): Argoal (2,377), Mathura (3,860) and Srirampur (2,442).

=== Literacy ===
As per the 2011 census the total number of literates in Patashpur II CD Block was 133,742 (86.50% of the population over 6 years) out of which 73,495 (55%) were males and 60,247 (45%) were females.

As per the 2011 census, literacy in Purba Medinipur district was 87.02%. Purba Medinipur had the highest literacy amongst all the districts of West Bengal in 2011. See also – List of West Bengal districts ranked by literacy rate

Literacy in CD blocks of
Purba Medinipur district
Tamluk subdivision
Tamluk – 87.06%
Sahid Matangini – 86.99%
Panskura I – 83.65%
Panskura II – 84.93%
Nandakumar – 85.56%
Chandipur – 87.81%
Moyna – 86.33%
Haldia subdivision
Mahishadal – 86.21%
Nandigram I – 84.89%
Nandigram II – 89.16%
Sutahata – 85.42%
Haldia – 85.96%
Contai subdivision
Contai I – 89.32%
Contai II – 88.33%
Contai III – 89.88%
Khejuri I – 88.90%
Khejuri II – 85.37%
Ramnagar I – 87.84%
Ramnagar II – 89.38%
Bhagabanpur II – 90.98%
Egra subdivision
Bhagabanpur I – 88.13%
Egra I – 82.83%
Egra II – 86.47%
Patashpur I – 86.58%
Patashpur II – 86.50%
2011 Census: CD Block Wise

Primary Census Abstract Data

=== Language and religion ===
Religion in Patashpur II CD block (2011)
Hinduism	87.62%
Islam	12.23%
Other or not stated	0.15%

In the 2011 census Hindus numbered 153,385 and formed 87.62% of the population in Patashpur II CD Block. Muslims numbered 21,400 and formed 12.23% of the population. Others numbered 271 and formed 0.15% of the population. In 2001, Hindus made up 89.35% and Muslims 10.62% of the population respectively.

Languages of Patashpur II CD block (2011)
1. Bengali (95.7%)
2. Urdu (2.39%)
3. Hindi (1.59%)
4. Others (0.36%)

According to the 2011 census, 95.66% of the population spoke Bengali, 2.39% Urdu and 1.59% Hindi as their first language.

== Rural poverty ==
The District Human Development Report for Purba Medinipur has provided a CD Block-wise data table for Modified Human Poverty Index of the district. Patashpur II CD Block registered 20.72 on the MHPI scale. The CD Block-wise mean MHPI was estimated at 24.78. Eleven out of twentyfive CD Blocks were found to be severely deprived in respect of grand CD Block average value of MHPI (CD Blocks with lower amount of poverty are better): All the CD Blocks of Haldia and Contai subdivisions appeared backward, except Ramnagar I & II, of all the blocks of Egra subdivision only Bhagabanpur I appeared backward and in Tamluk subdivision none appeared backward.

== Economy ==
=== Livelihood ===
In Patashpur II CD Block in 2011, total workers formed 38.12% of the total population and amongst the class of total workers, cultivators formed 30.91%, agricultural labourers 44.58%, household industry workers 4.07% and other workers 20.44%.

=== Infrastructure ===
There are 144 inhabited villages in Patashpur II CD block. All 144 villages (100%) have power supply. 143 villages (99.31%) have drinking water supply. 19 villages (13.19%) have post offices. 141 villages (97.92%) have telephones (including landlines, public call offices and mobile phones). 22 villages (15.28%) have a pucca (paved) approach road and 41 villages (28.47%) have transport communication (includes bus service, rail facility and navigable waterways). 14 villages (9.72%) have agricultural credit societies. 5 villages (3.47%) have banks.

In 2007–08, around 40% of rural households in the district had electricity.

In 2013–14, there were 134 fertiliser depots, 4 seed stores and 30 fair price shops in the CD Block.

=== Agriculture ===
Persons engaged in agriculture
in Patashpur II CD Block
1. Bargadars (8.26%)
2. Patta holders (13.9%)
3. Small farmers (2.53%)
4. Marginal farmers (35.0%)
5. Agricultural labourers (40.4%)

According to the District Human Development Report of Purba Medinipur: The agricultural sector is the lifeline of a predominantly rural economy. It is largely dependent on the Low Capacity Deep Tubewells (around 50%) or High Capacity Deep Tubewells (around 27%) for irrigation, as the district does not have a good network of canals, compared to some of the neighbouring districts. In many cases the canals are drainage canals which get the backflow of river water at times of high tide or the rainy season. The average size of land holding in Purba Medinipur, in 2005–06, was 0.73 hectares against 1.01 hectares in West Bengal.

In 2013–14, the total area irrigated in Patashpur II CD Block was 10,915 hectares, out of which 20 hectares were irrigated by canal water, 1,430 hectares by tank water, 1,525 hectares by deep tube well and 7,940 hectares by shallow tube well.

Although the Bargadari Act of 1950 recognised the rights of bargadars to a higher share of crops from the land that they tilled, it was not implemented fully. Large tracts, beyond the prescribed limit of land ceiling, remained with the rich landlords. From 1977 onwards major land reforms took place in West Bengal. Land in excess of land ceiling was acquired and distributed amongst the peasants. Following land reforms land ownership pattern has undergone transformation. In 2013–14, persons engaged in agriculture in Patashpur II CD Block could be classified as follows: bargadars 8.26%, patta (document) holders 13.90%, small farmers (possessing land between 1 and 2 hectares) 2.53%, marginal farmers (possessing land up to 1 hectare) 34.95% and agricultural labourers 40.36%.

In 2013–14, Patashpur II CD Block produced 60,151 tonnes of Aman paddy, the main winter crop, from 29,950 hectares, 25,042 tonnes of Boro paddy, the spring crop, from 9,209 hectares, 2.950 tonnes of Aus paddy, the summer cop, from 949 hectares, 501 tonnes of jute from 37 hectares and 1,066 tonnes of potatoes from 36 hectares. It also produced pulses and oilseeds.

Betelvine is a major source of livelihood in Purba Medinipur district, particularly in Tamluk and Contai subdivisions. Betelvine production in 2008-09 was the highest amongst all the districts and was around a third of the total state production. In 2008–09, Purba Mednipur produced 2,789 tonnes of cashew nuts from 3,340 hectares of land.

Concentration of Handicraft Activities in CD Blocks
- Horn Craft - Kolaghat
- Pata Chitra - Chandipur, Nandakumar
- Sea Shell – Ramnagar I & II
- Mat & Mat Diversified Products – Ramnagar I, Egra I & II, Patashpur I
- Brass & Bell Metal – Ramnagar I, Mahisadal, Patashpur II, Egra I
- Diversified Jute Products – Ramnagar II, Nandakumar, Kolaghat, Shahid Matangini
- Cane & Bamboo Products - Chandipur, Nandakumar, Kolaghat, Shahid Matangini
- Sola Craft - Tamluk, Kolaghat
- Pottery/Terracotta - Panskura, Tamluk, Sahid Matangini, Nandakumar
- Wood Craft - Tamluk
- Zari work- Sutahta, Mahisadal, Haldia, Nandakumar

Source: District Human Development Report, Purba Medinipur, Page 97

=== Pisciculture ===
Purba Medinipur's net district domestic product derives one fifth of its earnings from fisheries, the highest amongst all the districts of West Bengal. The nett area available for effective pisciculture in Patashpur II CD Block in 2013-14 was 825.00 hectares. 31,433 persons were engaged in the profession and approximate annual production was 70,315 quintals.

=== Banking ===
In 2013–14, Patashpur II CD Block had offices of 4 commercial banks and 2 gramin banks.

=== Backward Regions Grant Fund ===
Medinipur East district is listed as a backward region and receives financial support from the Backward Regions Grant Fund. The fund, created by the Government of India, is designed to redress regional imbalances in development. As of 2012, 272 districts across the country were listed under this scheme. The list includes 11 districts of West Bengal.

== Transport ==
Patashpur II CD Block has 7 originating/ terminating bus routes. The nearest railway station is 20 km from the block headquarters.

== Education ==
In 2013–14, Patashpur II CD Block had 121 primary schools with 7,624 students, 18 middle schools with 4,073 students, 11 high schools with 6,810 students and 18 higher secondary schools with 18,218 students. Patashpur II CD Block had 1 technical/ professional institution with 54 students and 289 institutions for special and non-formal education with 11,201 students.

As per the 2011 census, in Patashpur II CD block, amongst the 134 inhabited villages, 17 villages did not have a school, 27 villages had two or more primary schools, 29 villages had at least 1 primary and 1 middle school and 33 villages had at least 1 middle and 1 secondary school.

== Healthcare ==
In 2014, Patashpur II CD Block had 1 block primary health centre, 2 primary health centres and 2 nursing homes with total 40 beds and 6 doctors (excluding private bodies). It had 27 family welfare sub centres. 564 patients were treated indoor and 79,600 patients were treated outdoor in the hospitals, health centres and subcentres of the CD Block.

Patashpur Rural Hospital at Patashpur (with 30 beds) is the main medical facility in Patashpur II CD block. There are primary health centres at Pratapdighi (with 10 beds) and Argoal (with 10 beds).
