= Ramchandrapur, Purba Medinipur =

Ramchandrapur
- Village
- Location in West Bengal, India Ramchandrapur (India)
- Coordinates: 21.8084°N 87.4982°E
- Country: India
- State: West Bengal
- District: Purba Medinipur

Population (2011)
  - Total: 711

Languages
  - Official: Bengali, English
- Time zone: UTC+5:30 (IST)
- PIN: 721448 (Negua)
- Telephone/STD code: 03220
- Lok Sabha constituency: Midnapore
- Vidhan Sabha constituency: Egra
- Website: purbamedinipur.gov.in

Ramchandrapur is a village in Egra I CD block in Egra subdivision of Purba Medinipur district in the state of West Bengal, India.

== Geography ==
Cities and towns in Egra subdivision of Purba Medinipur district
M: municipal city/ town, CT: census town, R: rural/ urban centre, H: historical/ religious centre.
Owing to space constraints in the small map, the actual locations in a larger map may vary slightly

=== Location ===
Ramchandrapur is located at 21.8084°N 87.4982°E .

=== Urbanisation ===
96.96% of the population of Egra subdivision live in the rural areas. Only 3.04% of the population live in the urban areas, and that is the lowest proportion of urban population amongst the four subdivisions in Purba Medinipur district.

Note: The map alongside presents some of the notable locations in the subdivision. All places marked in the map are linked in the larger full screen map.

== Demographics ==
As per 2011 Census of India Ramchandrapur had a total population of 711 of which 371 (52%) were males and 340 (48%) were females. Population below 6 years was 83. The total number of literates in Ramchandrapur was 522 (83.12% of the population over 6 years).

== Transport ==
Ramchandrapur is on Kudi Paniparui Ramnagar Road.

== Healthcare ==
Ramchandrapur Block Primary Health Centre at Ramchandrapur, PO Kharbandhi (with 10 beds) is the main medical facility in Egra I CD block. There are primary health centres at Chatla (with 2 beds) and Kasabagola, PO Panchrol (with 2 beds).
