= Egra II =

- Community development block
- Coordinates: 21.8616581°N 87.6399994°E
- Country: India
- State: West Bengal
- District: Purba Medinipur

Government
  - Type: Community development block

Area
  - Total: 184.71 km^{2} (71.32 sq mi)
- Elevation: 5 m (16 ft)

Population (2011)
  - Total: 178,763
  - Density: 967.80/km^{2} (2,506.6/sq mi)

Languages
  - Official: Bengali, English
- Time zone: UTC+5:30 (IST)
- PIN: 721422 (Balighai); 721448 (Paniparul) 721452 (Satmile)
- Area code: 03229
- ISO 3166 code: IN-WB
- Vehicle registration: WB-29, WB-30, WB-31, WB-32, WB-33
- Literacy: 86.47%
- Lok Sabha constituency: Medinipur
- Vidhan Sabha constituency: Egra, Kanthi Uttar
- Website: purbamedinipur.gov.in

Egra II is a community development block that forms an administrative division in Egra subdivision of Purba Medinipur district in the Indian state of West Bengal.

== Geography ==
Purba Medinipur district is part of the lower Indo-Gangetic Plain and Eastern coastal plains. Topographically, the district can be divided into two parts – (a) almost entirely flat plains on the west, east and north, (b) the coastal plains on the south. The vast expanse of land is formed of alluvium and is composed of younger and coastal alluvial. The elevation of the district is within 10 metres above mean sea level. The district has a long coastline of 65.5 km along its southern and south eastern boundary. Five coastal CD Blocks, namely, Khejuri II, Contai II (Deshapran), Contai I, Ramnagar I and II, are occasionally affected by cyclones and tornadoes. Tidal floods are quite regular in these five CD Blocks. Normally floods occur in 21 of the 25 CD Blocks in the district. The major rivers are Haldi, Rupnarayan, Rasulpur, Bagui and Keleghai, flowing in north to south or south-east direction. River water is an important source of irrigation. The district has a low 899 hectare forest cover, which is 0.02% of its geographical area.

Bathuary, a constituent panchayat of Egra II block, is located at 21°51′42″N 87°38′24″E.

Egra II CD Block is bounded by Patashpur II CD Block in the north, Contai III and Contai I CD Blocks in the east, Ramnagar II CD Block in the south and Egra I CD Block in the west.

It is located 69 km from Tamluk, the district headquarters.

Egra II CD Block has an area of 184.71 km^{2}. It has 1 panchayat samity, 8 gram panchayats, 134 gram sansads (village councils), 117 mouzas and 115 inhabited villages. Egra police station serves this block. Headquarters of this CD Block is at Madhabpur.

Gram panchayats of Egra II block/ panchayat samiti are: Basudevpur, Bathuary, Deshbandhu, Dubda, Manjushree, Paniparul, Sarbodaya and Vivekananda.

== Demographics ==
=== Population ===
As per 2011 Census of India Egra II CD Block had a total population of 178,763, all of which were rural. There were 92,578 (52%) males and 86,185 (48%) females. Population below 6 years was 19,596. Scheduled Castes numbered 36,376 (10.93%) and Scheduled Tribes numbered 428 (0.24%).

As per 2001 census, Egra II block had a total population of 156,413, out of which 80,102 were males and 76,311 were females. Egra II block registered a population growth of 12.63 per cent during the 1991-2001 decade. Decadal growth for the combined Midnapore district was 14.87 per cent. Decadal growth in West Bengal was 17.84 per cent.

Large villages (with 4,000+ population) in Egra II CD Block (2011 census figures in brackets): Khejurda (5,265), Erenda (4,208), Dubda (12,885), Paniparul (10,469), Khagda (4,149), Uttar Daidpur (4,133), Bathuari (4,127), Tajpur (5,672), Basudebpur (9,129) and Shyamhari Bar (4,106).

=== Literacy ===
As per the 2011 census the total number of literates in Egra II CD Block was 137,635 (86.47% of the population over 6 years) out of which 76,579 (56%) were males and 60,876 (44%) were females.

As per the 2011 census, literacy in Purba Medinipur district was 87.02%. Purba Medinipur had the highest literacy amongst all the districts of West Bengal in 2011.

See also – List of West Bengal districts ranked by literacy rate

Literacy in CD blocks of
Purba Medinipur district
Tamluk subdivision
Tamluk – 87.06%
Sahid Matangini – 86.99%
Panskura I – 83.65%
Panskura II – 84.93%
Nandakumar – 85.56%
Chandipur – 87.81%
Moyna – 86.33%
Haldia subdivision
Mahishadal – 86.21%
Nandigram I – 84.89%
Nandigram II – 89.16%
Sutahata – 85.42%
Haldia – 85.96%
Contai subdivision
Contai I – 89.32%
Contai II – 88.33%
Contai III – 89.88%
Khejuri I – 88.90%
Khejuri II – 85.37%
Ramnagar I – 87.84%
Ramnagar II – 89.38%
Bhagabanpur II – 90.98%
Egra subdivision
Bhagabanpur I – 88.13%
Egra I – 82.83%
Egra II – 86.47%
Patashpur I – 86.58%
Patashpur II – 86.50%
2011 Census: CD Block Wise

Primary Census Abstract Data

=== Language and religion ===
Religion in Egra II CD block (2011)
Hinduism	93.57%
Islam	6.33%
Other or not stated	0.10%

In the 2011 census Hindus numbered 167,273 and formed 93.57% of the population in Egra II CD Block. Muslims numbered 11,317 and formed 6.33% of the population. Others numbered 173 and formed 0.10% of the population. In 2001, Hindus made up 94.35% and Muslims 5.60% of the population respectively.

Languages of Egra II CD block (2011)
1. Bengali (97.1%)
2. Urdu (2.11%)
3. Others (0.76%)

According to the 2011 census, 97.13% of the population spoke Bengali and 2.11% Urdu as their first language.

== Rural poverty ==
The District Human Development Report for Purba Medinipur has provided a CD Block-wise data table for Modified Human Poverty Index of the district. Egra II CD Block registered 24.56 on the MHPI scale. The CD Block-wise mean MHPI was estimated at 24.78. Eleven out of twentyfive CD Blocks were found to be severely deprived in respect of grand CD Block average value of MHPI (CD Blocks with lower amount of poverty are better): All the CD Blocks of Haldia and Contai subdivisions appeared backward, except Ramnagar I & II, of all the blocks of Egra subdivision only Bhagabanpur I appeared backward and in Tamluk subdivision none appeared backward.

== Economy ==
=== Livelihood ===
In Egra II CD Block in 2011, total workers formed 37.51% of the total population and amongst the class of total workers, cultivators formed 24.42%, agricultural labourers 47.46%, household industry workers 4.29% and other workers 23.83.%.

=== Infrastructure ===
There are 115 inhabited villages in Egra II CD block. All 115 villages (100%) have power supply. 113 villages (98.26%) have drinking water supply. 24 villages (20.87%) have post offices. 113 villages (98.26%) have telephones (including landlines, public call offices and mobile phones). 34 villages (29.57%) have a pucca (paved) approach road and 37 villages (32.16%) have transport communication (includes bus service, rail facility and navigable waterways). 29 villages (25.22%) have agricultural credit societies. 7 villages (6.09%) have banks.

In 2007-08, around 40% of rural households in the district had electricity.

All 117 mouzas in Egra II CD Block had drinking water facilities in 2013-14, there were 67 fertiliser depots, 20 seed stores and 31 fair price shops in the CD Block.

=== Agriculture ===
Persons engaged in agriculture
in Egra II CD Block
1. Bargadars (6.78%)
2. Patta holders (16.4%)
3. Small farmers (2.38%)
4. Marginal farmers (31.6%)
5. Agricultural labourers (42.9%)

According to the District Human Development Report of Purba Medinipur: The agricultural sector is the lifeline of a predominantly rural economy. It is largely dependent on the Low Capacity Deep Tubewells (around 50%) or High Capacity Deep Tubewells (around 27%) for irrigation, as the district does not have a good network of canals, compared to some of the neighbouring districts. In many cases the canals are drainage canals which get the backflow of river water at times of high tide or the rainy season. The average size of land holding in Purba Medinipur, in 2005-06, was 0.73 hectares against 1.01 hectares in West Bengal.

In 2013-14, the total area irrigated in Egra II CD Block was 9,680 hectares, out of which 550 hectares were irrigated by canal water, 175 hectares by tank water, 7,735 hectares by deep tube well, 920 hectares by shallow tube well and 300 hectares by other means.

Although the Bargadari Act of 1950 recognised the rights of bargadars to a higher share of crops from the land that they tilled, it was not implemented fully. Large tracts, beyond the prescribed limit of land ceiling, remained with the rich landlords. From 1977 onwards major land reforms took place in West Bengal. Land in excess of land ceiling was acquired and distributed amongst the peasants. Following land reforms land ownership pattern has undergone transformation. In 2013-14, persons engaged in agriculture in Egra II CD Block could be classified as follows: bargadars 6.78%, patta (document) holders 16.39%, small farmers (possessing land between 1 and 2 hectares) 2.38%, marginal farmers (possessing land up to 1 hectare) 31.58% and agricultural labourers 42.86%.

In 2013-14, Egra II CD Block produced 79,675 tonnes of Aman paddy, the main winter crop, from 29,728 hectares, 19,048 tonnes of Boro paddy, the spring crop, from 4,759 hectares and 1,386 tonnes of potatoes from 48 hectares. It also produced oilseeds.

Betelvine is a major source of livelihood in Purba Medinipur district, particularly in Tamluk and Contai subdivisions. Betelvine production in 2008-09 was the highest amongst all the districts and was around a third of the total state production. In 2008-09, Purba Mednipur produced 2,789 tonnes of cashew nuts from 3,340 hectares of land.

Concentration of Handicraft Activities in CD Blocks
- Horn Craft - Kolaghat
- Pata Chitra - Chandipur, Nandakumar
- Sea Shell – Ramnagar I & II
- Mat & Mat Diversified Products – Ramnagar I, Egra I & II, Patashpur I
- Brass & Bell Metal – Ramnagar I, Mahisadal, Patashpur II, Egra I
- Diversified Jute Products – Ramnagar II, Nandakumar, Kolaghat, Shahid Matangini
- Cane & Bamboo Products - Chandipur, Nandakumar, Kolaghat, Shahid Matangini
- Sola Craft - Tamluk, Kolaghat
- Pottery/Terracotta - Panskura, Tamluk, Sahid Matangini, Nandakumar
- Wood Craft - Tamluk
- Zari work- Sutahta, Mahisadal, Haldia, Nandakumar

Source: District Human Development Report, Purba Medinipur, Page 97

=== Pisciculture ===
Purba Medinipur's net district domestic product derives one fifth of its earnings from fisheries, the highest amongst all the districts of West Bengal. The nett area available for effective pisciculture in Egra II CD Block in 2013-14 was 2700.45 hectares. 6,720 persons were engaged in the profession and approximate annual production was 102,887 quintals, the highest amongst all the CD Blocks in Purba Medinipur district.

=== Banking ===
In 2013-14, Egra II CD Block had offices of 5 commercial banks and 3 gramin banks.

=== Backward Regions Grant Fund ===
Medinipur East district is listed as a backward region and receives financial support from the Backward Regions Grant Fund. The fund, created by the Government of India, is designed to redress regional imbalances in development. As of 2012, 272 districts across the country were listed under this scheme. The list includes 11 districts of West Bengal.

== Transport ==
Egra II CD Block has 3 originating/ terminating bus routes. The nearest railway station is 23 km from the CD Block headquarters.

SH 5 connecting Rupnarayanpur (in Bardhaman district) and Junput (in Purba Medinipur district) passes through Egra.

== Education ==
In 2013-14, Egra II CD Block had 110 primary schools with 5,565 students, 12 middle schools with 659 students, 8 high schools with 4,259 students and 15 higher secondary schools with 21,080 students. Egra II CD Block had 328 institutions for special and non-formal education with 11,455 students.

As per the 2011 census, in Egra II CD block, amongst the 115 inhabited villages, 20 villages did not have a school, 50 villages had two or more primary schools, 35 villages had at least 1 primary and 1 middle school and 22 villages had at least 1 middle and 1 secondary school.

== Healthcare ==
In 2014, Egra II CD Block had 1 block primary health centre and 3 primary health centres with total 50 beds and 5 doctors (excluding private bodies). It had 28 family welfare sub centres. 2,597 patients were treated indoor and 76,615 patients were treated outdoor in the hospitals, health centres and subcentres of the CD Block.

Gangadharbar Rural Hospital at Gangadharbar, PO Pirijkhanbar (with 30 beds) is the main medical facility in Egra II CD block. There are primary health centres at Paniparul (with 10 beds), Betamaheshpur, PO Maheshpur (with 10 beds) and Shyampur, PO Bidurpur (with 2 beds).
