= Egra subdivision =

- Subdivision
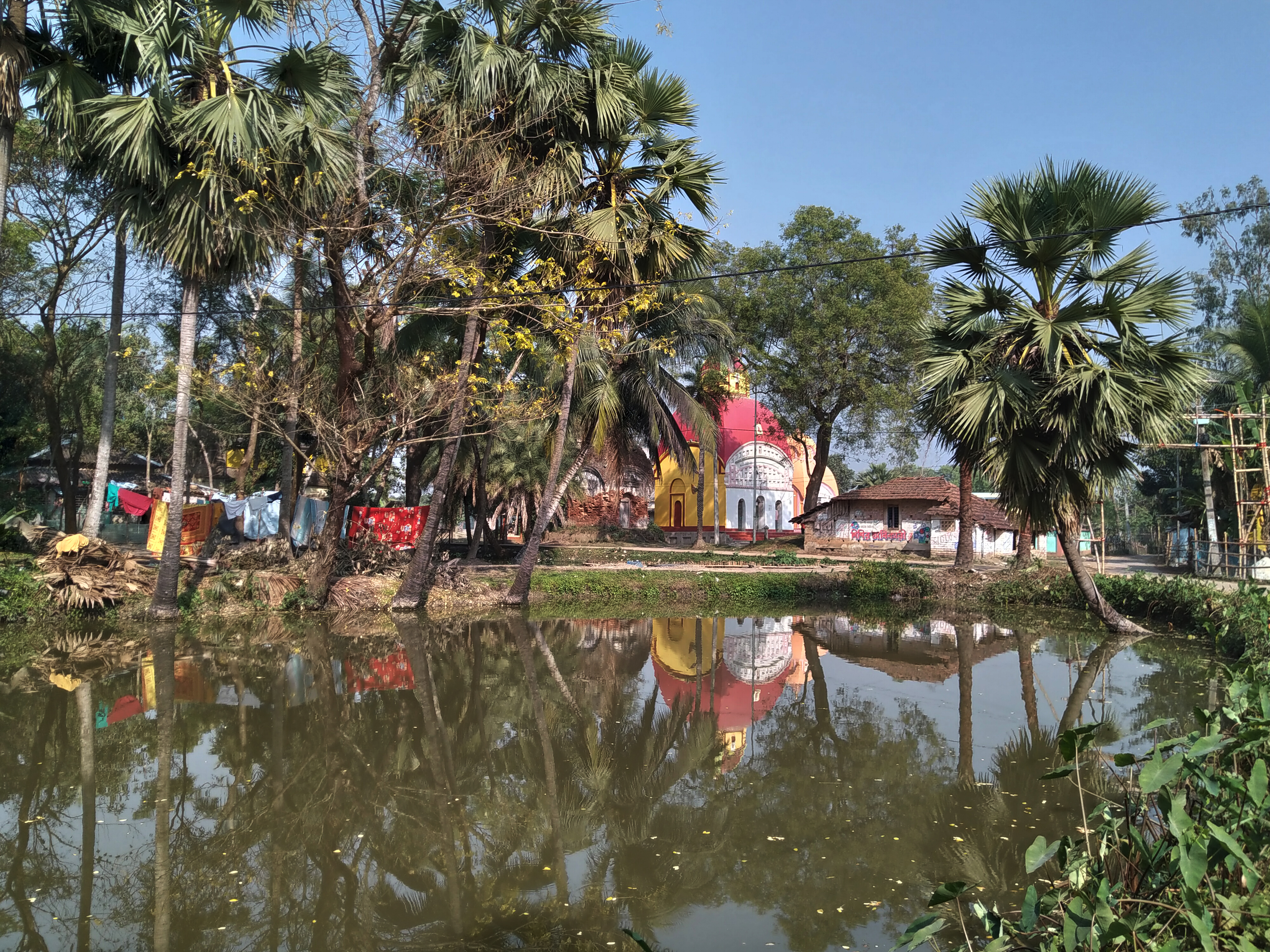
- The 19th century Dakhsina Kali temple at Bhagabanpur

- Coordinates: 21.90°N 87.53°E
- Country: India
- State: West Bengal
- District: Purba Medinipur
- Headquarters: Egra

Area
  - Total: 940.96 km^{2} (363.31 sq mi)

Population
  - Total: 958,939
  - Density: 1,019.1/km^{2} (2,639.5/sq mi)

Languages
  - Official: Bengali, English
- Time zone: UTC+5:30 (IST)
- ISO 3166 code: IN-WB
- Vehicle registration: WB
- Website: wb.gov.in

Egra subdivision is a subdivision of the Purba Medinipur district in the state of West Bengal, India.

== Subdivisions ==
Purba Medinipur district is divided into the following administrative subdivisions:

Subdivision	Headquarters	Area km^{2}	Population (2011)	Rural population % (2001)	Urban population % (2001)
Tamluk	Tamluk	1084.30	1,791,695	94.08	5.92
Haldia	Haldia	683.94	959,934	79.19	20.81
Egra	Egra	940.96	958,939	96.96	3.04
Contai	Contai	1251.21	1,385,307	93.55	6.45
Purba Medinipur district	Tamluk	4,713.00	5,095,875	91.71	8.29

== Administrative units ==
Cities and towns in Egra subdivision of Purba Medinipur district
M: municipal city/ town, CT: census town, R: rural/ urban centre, H: historical/ religious centre.
Owing to space constraints in the small map, the actual locations in a larger map may vary slightly

Egra subdivision has 3 police stations, 5 community development blocks, 5 panchayat samitis, 42 gram panchayats, 708 mouzas, 682 inhabited villages, 1 municipality and 3 census towns. The municipality is: Egra. The census towns are: Amarshi Kasba, Benudia and Hincha Gerya. The subdivision has its headquarters at Egra.

Note: The map alongside presents some of the notable locations in the subdivision. All places marked in the map are linked in the larger full screen map.

== Area ==
Egra subdivision has an area of 940.96 km^{2}, population in 2011 of 958,939 and density of population of 1,019 per km^{2}. 18.82% of the population of the district resides in this subdivision.

== Police stations ==
Police stations in Egra subdivision have the following features and jurisdiction:

Police Station	Area covered km^{2} *	Inter-state border	Municipal Town	CD Block
Patashpur	354.09	-	-	Patashpur I, Patashpur II
Bhagabanpur	179.95	-	-	Bhagabanpur I
Egra	431.5	Baleshwar district of Odisha on the south-west	Egra	Egra I, Egra II

*The data for area is as per the website of Purba Medinipur Police, but it appears that it has not been updated for a long time.

== Blocks ==
Community development blocks in Egra subdivision are:

CD Block	Headquarters	Area km^{2}	Population (2011)	SC %	ST %	Literacy rate %	Census Towns
Patashpur I	Amarshi Kasba	172.26	173,377	14.04	0.65	86.58	1
Patashpur II	Pratapdighi	191.74	175,056	12.04	0.79	86.50	-
Bhagabanpur I	Kajlagarh	174.24	234,432	14.26	0.18	88.13	2
Egra I	Egra	197.10	167,163	9.25	1.57	82.83	-
Egra II	Madhabpur	184.71	178,763	10.96	0.24	86.47	-

== Gram Panchayats ==
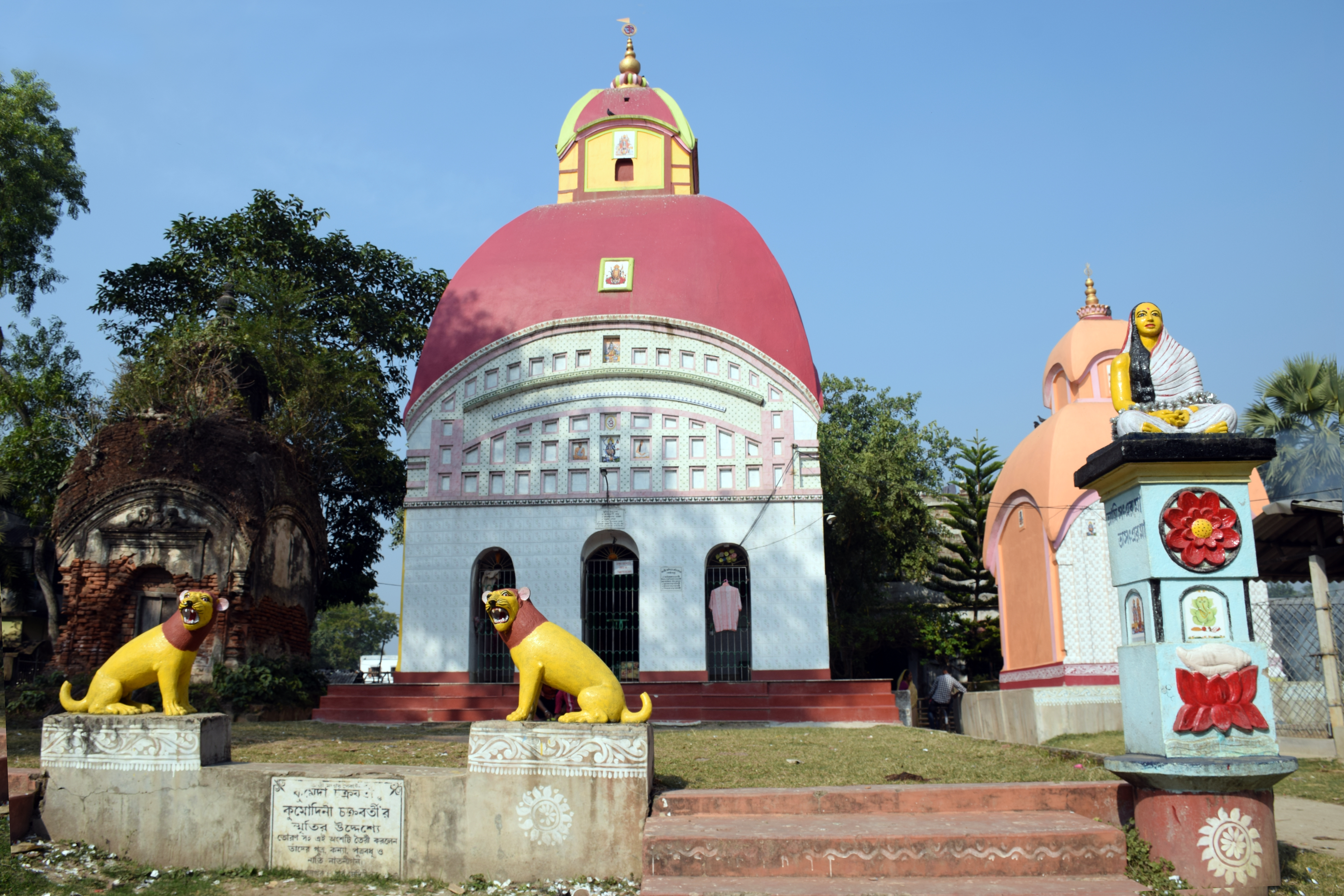
Front view of Aatchala Dakhsina Kali temple at Bhagabanpur

The subdivision contains 42 gram panchayats under 5 community development blocks:

- Bhagabanpur I block: Benodia, Gurgram, Kalaberia, Shimulia, Bhagwanpur, Kajlagarh, Mahammadpur–I, Bivisanpur, Kakra and Mahammadpur–II.
- Egra I Barida, Jumki, Rishi Bankimchandra, Chatri, Kasba–Egra, Jerthan, Panchrol and Saharha.
- Egra II block: Basudevpur, Bibekananda, Dubda, Paniparul, Bathuari, Deshbandhu, Manjusree and Sarbaday.
- Patashpur I block: Amarshi–I, Brajalalpur, Gokulpur, Amarshi–II, Chistipur–I, Gopalpur, Barhat, Chistipur–II and Naipur.
- Patashpur II block: Argoyal, Mathura, Pataspur, Sreerampur, Khargram, Panchet and South Khanda.

== Education ==
With a literacy rate of 87.66% Purba Medinipur district ranked first amongst all districts of West Bengal in literacy as per the provisional figures of the census of India 2011. Within Purba Medinipur district, Tamluk subdivision had a literacy rate of 85.98%, Haldia subdivision 86.67%, Egra subdivision 86.18% and Contai subdivision 89.19%. All CD Blocks and municipalities in the district had literacy levels above 80%.

Given in the table below is a comprehensive picture of the education scenario in Purba Medinipur district for the year 2013-14.

Subdivision	Primary School		Middle School		High School		Higher Secondary School		General College, Univ		Technical / Professional Instt		Non-formal Education	
Subdivision	Institution	Student	Institution	Student	Institution	Student	Institution	Student	Institution	Student	Institution	Student	Institution	Student
Tamluk	1,084	84,258	78	5,789	77	43,408	144	171,516	6	12,728	17	2,747	2,704	112,411
Haldia	557	43,173	40	5,082	54	36,767	77	83,659	5	9,792	16	6,256	1,359	59,879
Egra	629	41,418	76	11,537	49	32,167	74	90,730	3	9,498	2	154	1,595	62,200
Contai	983	50,945	99	10,557	81	46,690	102	120,128	5	12,223	10	1,602	2,316	90,552
Purba Medinipur district	3,253	219,794	293	32,965	261	159,032	397	466,093	19	44,241	45	10,759	7,974	375,042

Note: Primary schools include junior basic schools; middle schools, high schools and higher secondary schools include madrasahs; technical schools include junior technical schools, junior government polytechnics, industrial technical institutes, industrial training centres, nursing training institutes etc.; technical and professional colleges include engineering colleges, polytechnics, medical colleges, para-medical institutes, management colleges, teachers training and nursing training colleges, law colleges, art colleges, music colleges etc. Special and non-formal education centres include sishu siksha kendras, madhyamik siksha kendras, centres of Rabindra mukta vidyalaya, recognised Sanskrit tols, institutions for the blind and other handicapped persons, Anganwadi centres, reformatory schools etc.

The following institutions are located in Egra subdivision:

- Egra Sarada Shashi Bhusan College was established at Egra in 1968. It is affiliated to Vidyasagar University and offers undergraduate courses in arts, science and commerce, It has hostel facilities.
- Bajkul Milani Mahavidyalaya was established at Tethi Bari mouza, PO Kismat Bajkul, in 1964. It is affiliated to Vidyasagar University.
- Yogoda Satsanga Palpara Mahavidyalaya was established in 1964 at Palpara. It offers undergraduate, as well as B.Ed. and M.Ed. courses,

== Healthcare ==
The table below (all data in numbers) presents an overview of the medical facilities available and patients treated in the hospitals, health centres and sub-centres in 2014 in Purba Medinipur district.

Subdivision	Health & Family Welfare Deptt, WB				Other State Govt Deptts	Local bodies	Central Govt Deptts / PSUs	NGO / Private Nursing Homes	Total	Total Number of Beds	Total Number of Doctors	Indoor Patients	Outdoor Patients
Subdivision	Hospitals	Rural Hospitals	Block Primary Health Centres	Primary Health Centres	Other State Govt Deptts	Local bodies	Central Govt Deptts / PSUs	NGO / Private Nursing Homes	Total	Total Number of Beds	Total Number of Doctors	Indoor Patients	Outdoor Patients
Tamluk	1	-	7	14	-	-	-	70	92	1,506	96	61,84	1,251,099
Haldia	1	2	3	10	-	-	-	19	35	803	67	27,586	757,876
Egra	1	1	4	11	-	-	-	21	38	489	42	23,699	419,829
Contai	2	-	8	16	-	-	-	22	48	688	88	59,882	890,607
Purba Medinipur district	5	3	22	51	-	-	-	132	213	3,486	293	172,251	3,319,411

Medical facilities available in Egra subdivision are as follows:

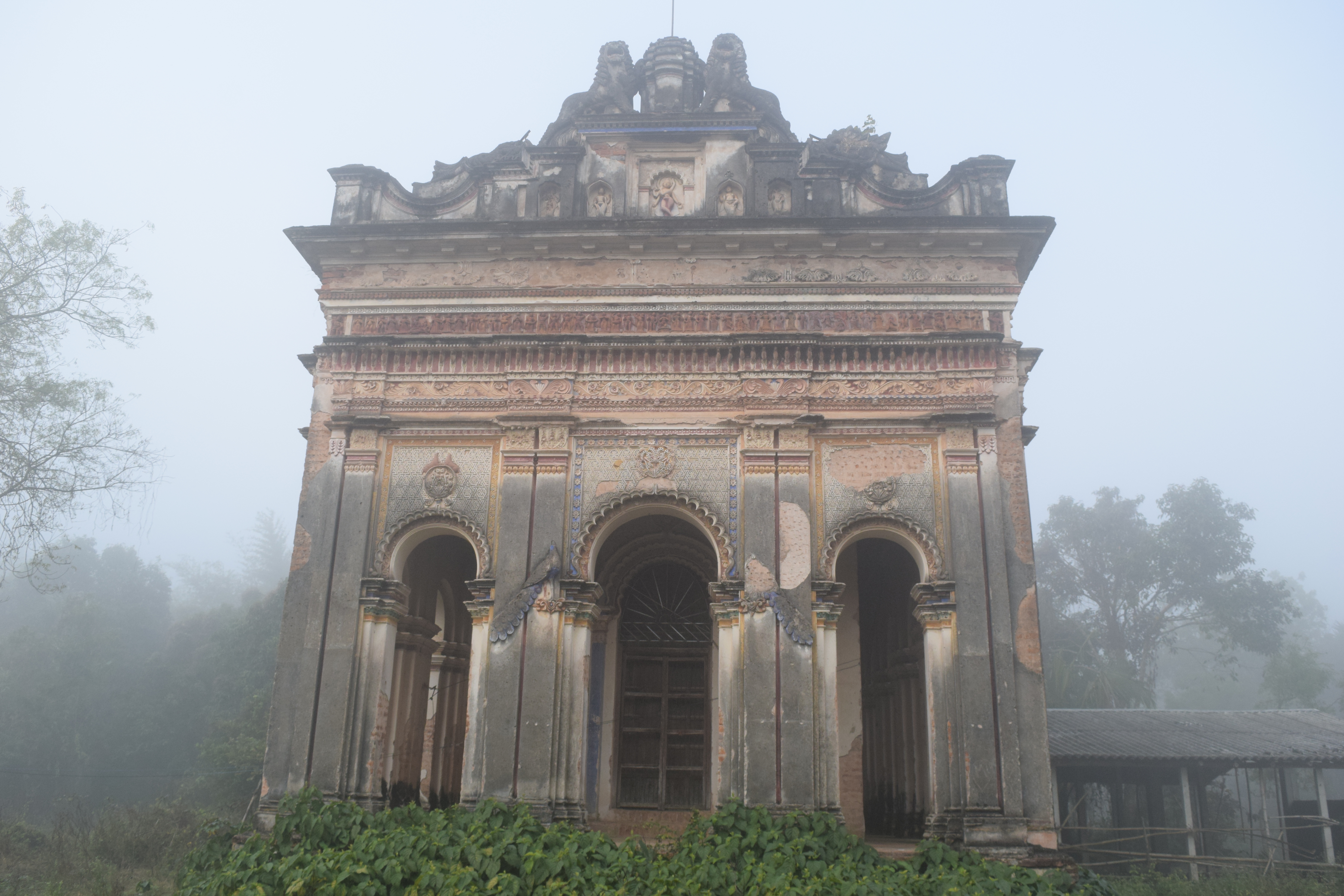
Sharabhuja Gauranga Dalan temple at Panchrol, Egra subdivision

Hospitals: (Name, location, beds)
Egra Subdivision Hospital, Egra, 68 beds
Rural Hospitals: (Name, CD block, location, beds)
Bhagabanpur Rural Hospital, Bhagabanpur I CD block, Bhagabanpur, 30 beds
Gangadharbar Rural Hospital, Egra II CD block, Gangadharbar, PO Pirijkhanbar, 30 beds
Patashpur Rural Hospital, Patashpur II CD block, Patashpur, 30 beds
Block Primary Health Centre: (Name, block, location, beds)
Gonara BPHC, Patashpur I CD Block, Golara Nij, PO Manglamaro, 10 beds
Ramchandrapur BPHC, Egra I CD Block, Ramchandrapur, PO Kharbandhi, 10 beds
Primary Health Centres: (CD block-wise)(CD block, PHC location, beds)
Egra I CD block: Chatla (2), Kasabagola, PO Panchrol (2)
Egra II CD block: Paniparul (10), Betamaheshpur, PO Maheshpur (10), Shyampur, PO Bidurpur (2)
Patashpur I CD block: Borhat, PO Katranka (6)
Patashpur II CD block: Pratapdighi (10), Argoal (10)
Bhagabanpur I CD block: Bibhisanpur (10), Kajalgarh (6), Seulipur, PO Paschimbarh (6)

== Electoral constituencies ==
Lok Sabha (parliamentary) and Vidhan Sabha (state assembly) constituencies in Purba Medinipur district were as follows:

Lok Sabha constituency	Vidhan Sabha constituency	Reservation	CD Block and/or Gram panchayats
Ghatal	Panskura Paschim	None	Panskura CD Block
	Other assembly segments in Paschim Medinipur district		
Tamluk	Tamluk	None	Tamluk municipality, Bishnubarh II, Pipulberia I, Pipulberia II and Uttar Sonamui gram panchayats of Tamluk CD Block, and Sahid Matangini CD Block
	Panskura Purba	None	Kolaghat CD Block
	Moyna	None	Moyna CD Block, Anantapur I, Anantapur II, Nilkunthia, Sreerampur I and Sreerampur II GPs of Tamluk CD Block
	Nandakumar	None	Nandakumar CD Block and Bishnubarh I, Padumpur I and Padumpur II GPs of Tamluk CD Block
	Mahisadal	None	Mahisadal and Haldia CD Blocks
	Haldia	SC	Haldia municipality and Sutahata CD Block
	Nandigram	None	Nandigram I and Nandigram II CD Blocks
Kanthi	Chandipur	None	Chandipur CD Block and Benodia, Bivisanpur, Gurgram, Kakra, Mahammadpur I and Mahammadpur II GPs of Bhagabanpur I CD Block
	Paashpur	None	Patashpur I CD Block; Khargram, Panchet, Pataspur, South Khanda and Sreerampur gram panchayats of Patashpur II CD Block
	Kanthi Uttar	None	Deshapran CD Block, Brajachauli, Debendra, Kanaidighi, Kumirda, Lauda and Marishda GPs of Contai III CD Block and Bathuari GP of Egra II CD Block
	Bhagabanpur	None	Bhagabanpur, Kajlagarh, Kalaberia and Shimulia GPs of Bhagabanpur I CD Block, Arjunnagar, Basudevberia, Baroj, Itaberia, Jukhia, Mugberia and Radhapur GPs of Bhagabanpur II CD Block, and Argoyal and Mathura GPs of Patashpur II CD Block
	Khejuri	SC	Khejuri I and Khejuri II CD Blocks, and Garbari I and Garbari II GPs of Bhagabanpur II CD Block
	Kanthi Dakshin	None	Contai municipality, Contai I CD Block, and Durmuth and Kusumpur GPs of Contai III CD Block
	Ramnagar	None	Ramnagar I and Ramnagar II CD Blocks
