= Bhagabanpur I =

- Community development block
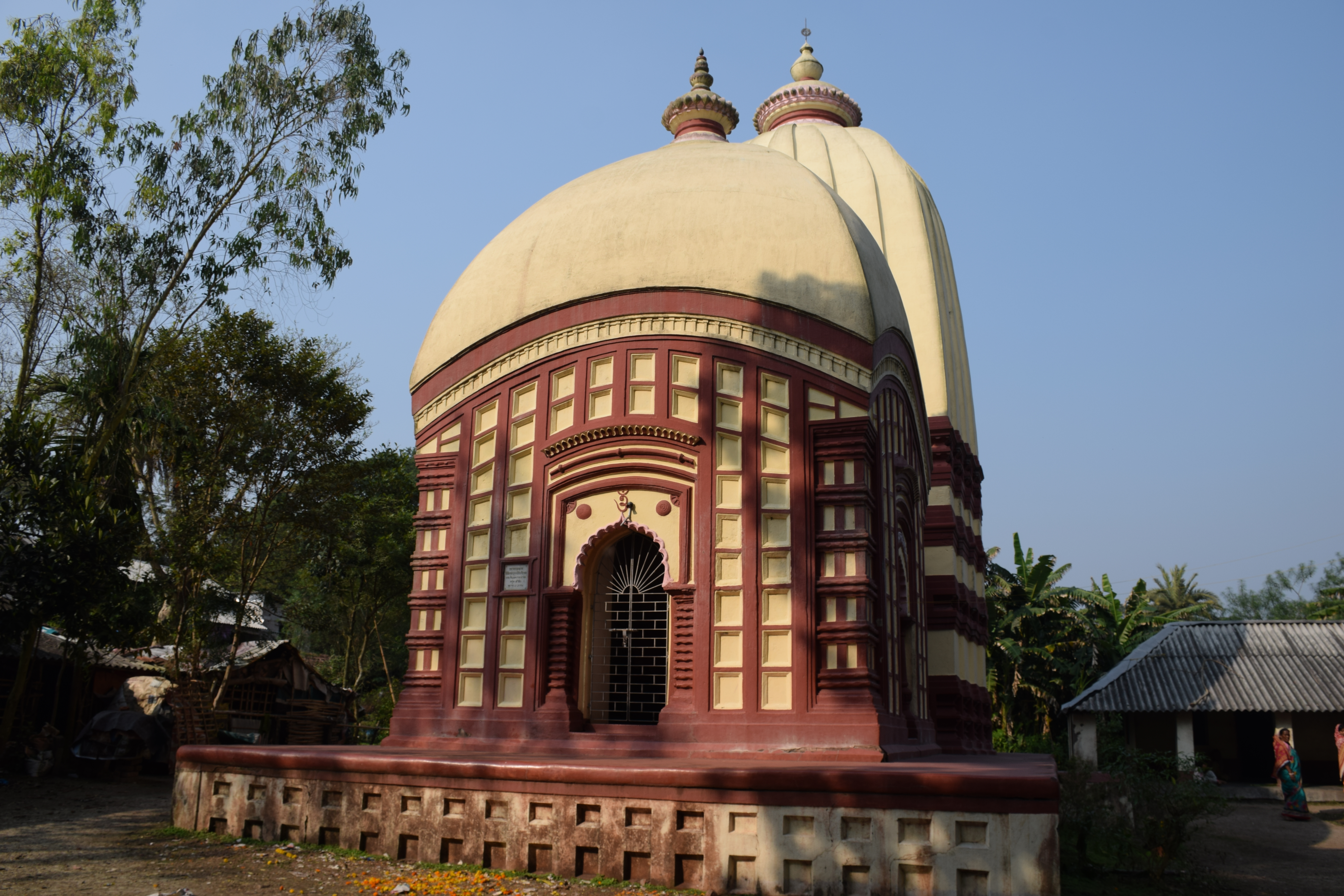
- The Shyama Sundara deul with porch in front at Paikbheri built in 1730

- Location in West Bengal, India
- Coordinates: 22.094°N 87.759°E
- Country: India
- State: West Bengal
- District: Purba Medinipur

Government
  - Type: Community development block

Area
  - Total: 174.24 km^{2} (67.27 sq mi)
- Elevation: 5 m (16 ft)

Population (2011)
  - Total: 234,432
  - Density: 1,345.5/km^{2} (3,484.7/sq mi)

Languages
  - Official: Bengali, English
- Time zone: UTC+5:30 (IST)
- PIN: 721601 (Bhagwanpur); 721626 (Kajlagarh)
- Area code: 03220
- ISO 3166 code: IN-WB
- Vehicle registration: WB-29, WB-30, WB-31, WB-32, WB-33
- Literacy: 88.13%
- Lok Sabha constituency: Kanthi
- Vidhan Sabha constituency: Bhagabanpur, Chandipur
- Website: purbamedinipur.gov.in

Bhagabanpur I (also spelt as Bhagawanpur) is a community development block that forms an administrative division in Egra subdivision of Purba Medinipur district in the Indian state of West Bengal.

== Geography ==
Purba Medinipur district is part of the lower Indo-Gangetic Plain and Eastern coastal plains. Topographically, the district can be divided into two parts – (a) almost entirely flat plains on the west, east and north, (b) the coastal plains on the south. The vast expanse of land is formed of alluvium and is composed of younger and coastal alluvial. The elevation of the district is within 10 metres above mean sea level. The district has a long coastline of 65.5 km along its southern and south eastern boundary. Five coastal CD Blocks, namely, Khejuri II, Contai II (Deshapran), Contai I, Ramnagar I and II, are occasionally affected by cyclones and tornadoes. Tidal floods are quite regular in these five CD Blocks. Normally floods occur in 21 of the 25 CD Blocks in the district. The major rivers are Haldi, Rupnarayan, Rasulpur, Bagui and Keleghai, flowing in north to south or south-east direction. River water is an important source of irrigation. The district has a low 899 hectare forest cover, which is 0.02% of its geographical area.

Bhagabanpur is located at 22°05′38″N 87°45′32″E.

Bhagabanpur I CD Block is bounded by Moyna CD Block in the north, Chandipur CD Block in the east, Bhagabanpur II CD Block in the south and Sabang CD Block, in Paschim Medinipur district, and Patashpur II CD Block in the west.

It is located 27 km from Tamluk, the district headquarters.

Bhagabanpur I CD Block has an area of 174.24 km^{2}. It has 1 panchayat samity, 10 gram panchayats, 167 gram sansads (village councils), 167 mouzas and 164 inhabited villages. Bhagabanpur police station serves this block. Headquarters of this CD Block is at Kajlagarh.

Gram panchayats of Bhagabanpur I block are: Benudia, Bhagabanpur, Bibhisanpur, Gurgram, Kajlagarh, Kakra, Koatbarh, Mahammadpur I, Mahammadpur II and Simulia.

Sites in the area, which attract tourists, include: Kali Temple, Ram Temple, Bhagabanpur Masjid, Syed Mazar, Kajlagarh Raj Palace and the temple at Bhimeswari. Apart from these there is a 'Sahid Bedi'. That is a temple like bedi, the top of which contains a pot. Myths say this 'bedi' is in the memory of the freedom fighters who died during a fight with the British Police in 1942 and the pot contains blood of those freedom fighters). A children's park is going to be set up 2 km from the Shib Bazar bus stand.

== Demographics ==
=== Population ===
As per 2011 Census of India Bhagawanpur I CD Block had a total population of 234,432, of which 222,677 were rural and 11,755 were urban. There were 121,301 (52%) males and 113,131 (48%) females. Population below 6 years was 28,910. Scheduled Castes numbered 33,435 (14.26%) and Scheduled Tribes numbered 411 (0.18%).

As per 2001 census, Bhagabanpur I block had a total population of 198,868, out of which 101,548 were males and 97,320 were females. Bhagabanpur I block registered a population growth of 13.59% during the 1991-2001 decade. Decadal growth for the combined Midnapore district was 14.87%. Decadal growth in West Bengal was 17.84%.

Census towns in Bhagabanpur I CD Block (2011 census figures in brackets): Benudia (6,797) and Hincha Gerya (4,958).

Large villages (with 4,000+ population) in Bhagabanpur I CD Block (2011 census figures in brackets): Mahammadpur (9,438), Gur Gram (9,028), Kakra (4,887), Bibhisanpur (6,311), Simulia (4,733), Betulya Chaklalpur (4,653), Kotbar (4,737), Sar Berya (5,903) and Narayan Danri (5,069).

Other villages in Bhagabanpur CD Block (2011 census figure in brackets) : Bhagabanpur (2,566), Kalaberia (3,276), Paikbheri (1,124).

=== Literacy ===
As per 2011 census the total number of literates in Bhagabanpur I CD Block was 181,121 (88.13% of the population over 6 years) out of which 99,276 (55%) were males and 81,845 (45%) were females.

As per 2011 census, literacy in Purba Medinipur district was 87.02%. Purba Medinipur had the highest literacy amongst all the districts of West Bengal in 2011.

See also – List of West Bengal districts ranked by literacy rate

Literacy in CD blocks of
Purba Medinipur district
Tamluk subdivision
Tamluk – 87.06%
Sahid Matangini – 86.99%
Panskura I – 83.65%
Panskura II – 84.93%
Nandakumar – 85.56%
Chandipur – 87.81%
Moyna – 86.33%
Haldia subdivision
Mahishadal – 86.21%
Nandigram I – 84.89%
Nandigram II – 89.16%
Sutahata – 85.42%
Haldia – 85.96%
Contai subdivision
Contai I – 89.32%
Contai II – 88.33%
Contai III – 89.88%
Khejuri I – 88.90%
Khejuri II – 85.37%
Ramnagar I – 87.84%
Ramnagar II – 89.38%
Bhagabanpur II – 90.98%
Egra subdivision
Bhagabanpur I – 88.13%
Egra I – 82.83%
Egra II – 86.47%
Patashpur I – 86.58%
Patashpur II – 86.50%
2011 Census: CD Block Wise

Primary Census Abstract Data

=== Language and religion ===
Religion in Bhagabanpur I CD block (2011)
Hinduism	86.08%
Islam	13.82%
Other or not stated	0.10%

In 2011 census Hindus numbered 201,802 and formed 86.08% of the population in Bhagabanpur I CD Block. Muslims numbered 32,389 and formed 13.82% of the population. Others numbered 241 and formed 0.10% of the population. In 2001, Hindus made up 87.56% and Muslims 12.41% of the population respectively.

Languages of Bhagabanpur I CD block (2011)
1. Bengali (97.7%)
2. Khortha (1.95%)
3. Others (0.33%)

According to the 2011 census, 97.71% of the population spoke Bengali and 1.96% Khortha as their first language.

== Rural poverty ==
The District Human Development Report for Purba Medinipur has provided a CD Block-wise data table for Modified Human Poverty Index of the district. Bhagabanpur I CD Block registered 27.81 on the MHPI scale. The CD Block-wise mean MHPI was estimated at 24.78. Eleven out of twentyfive CD Blocks were found to be severely deprived in respect of grand CD Block average value of MHPI (CD Blocks with lower amount of poverty are better): All the CD Blocks of Haldia and Contai subdivisions appeared backward, except Ramnagar I & II, of all the blocks of Egra subdivision only Bhagabanpur I appeared backward and in Tamluk subdivision none appeared backward.

== Economy ==
=== Livelihood ===
In Bhagabapur I CD Block in 2011, total workers formed 38.56% of the total population and amongst the class of total workers, cultivators formed 15.87%, agricultural labourers 48.98%, household industry workers 10.24% and other workers 24.90%.

=== Infrastructure ===
There are 164 inhabited villages in Bhagabanpur I CD block. All 164 villages (100%) have power supply. 163 villages (99.39%) have drinking water supply. 35 villages (21.34%) have post offices. 154 villages (93.9%) have telephones (including landlines, public call offices and mobile phones). 22 villages (13.41%) have a pucca (paved) approach road and 50 villages (30.49%) have transport communication (includes bus service, rail facility and navigable waterways). 38 villages (23.17%) have agricultural credit societies. 6 villages (3.66%) have banks.

In 2007–08, around 40% of rural households in the district had electricity.

In 2013–14, there were 47 fertiliser depots, 5 seed stores and 37 fair price shops in the CD Block.

=== Agriculture ===
Persons engaged in agriculture
in Bhagabanpur I CD Block
1. Bargadars (10.7%)
2. Patta holders (10.4%)
3. Small farmers (1.64%)
4. Marginal farmers (33.4%)
5. Agricultural labourers (43.8%)

According to the District Human Development Report of Purba Medinipur: The agricultural sector is the lifeline of a predominantly rural economy. It is largely dependent on the Low Capacity Deep Tubewells (around 50%) or High Capacity Deep Tubewells (around 27%) for irrigation, as the district does not have a good network of canals, compared to some of the neighbouring districts. In many cases the canals are drainage canals which get the backflow of river water at times of high tide or the rainy season. The average size of land holding in Purba Medinipur, in 2005–06, was 0.73 hectares against 1.01 hectares in West Bengal.

In 2013–14, the total area irrigated in Bhagabanpur I CD Block was 9,910 hectares, out of which 260 hectares were irrigated by canal water, 2,200 hectares by tank water and 7,450 hectares by deep tube well.

Although the Bargadari Act of 1950 recognised the rights of bargadars to a higher share of crops from the land that they tilled, it was not implemented fully. Large tracts, beyond the prescribed limit of land ceiling, remained with the rich landlords. From 1977 onwards major land reforms took place in West Bengal. Land in excess of land ceiling was acquired and distributed amongst the peasants. Following land reforms land ownership pattern has undergone transformation. In 2013–14, persons engaged in agriculture in Bhagabanpur I CD Block could be classified as follows: bargadars 10.74%, patta (document) holders 10.42%, small farmers (possessing land between 1 and 2 hectares) 1.64%, marginal farmers (possessing land up to 1 hectare) 33.39% and agricultural labourers 43.81%.

In 2013–14, Bhagabanpur I CD Block produced 9,783 tonnes of Aman paddy, the main winter crop, from 10,275 hectares, 33,686 tonnes of Boro paddy, the spring crop, from 11,946 hectares, 332 tonnes of Aus paddy, the summer crop, from 476 hectares, 14 tonnes of jute from 1 hectares and 1,221 tonnes of potatoes from 85 hectares. It also produced pulses and oilseeds.

Betelvine is a major source of livelihood in Purba Medinipur district, particularly in Tamluk and Contai subdivisions. Betelvine production in 2008-09 was the highest amongst all the districts and was around a third of the total state production. In 2008–09, Purba Mednipur produced 2,789 tonnes of cashew nuts from 3,340 hectares of land.

Concentration of Handicraft Activities in CD Blocks
- Horn Craft - Kolaghat
- Pata Chitra - Chandipur, Nandakumar
- Sea Shell – Ramnagar I & II
- Mat & Mat Diversified Products – Ramnagar I, Egra I & II, Patashpur I
- Brass & Bell Metal – Ramnagar I, Mahisadal, Patashpur II, Egra I
- Diversified Jute Products – Ramnagar II, Nandakumar, Kolaghat, Shahid Matangini
- Cane & Bamboo Products - Chandipur, Nandakumar, Kolaghat, Shahid Matangini
- Sola Craft - Tamluk, Kolaghat
- Pottery/Terracotta - Panskura, Tamluk, Sahid Matangini, Nandakumar
- Wood Craft - Tamluk
- Zari work- Sutahta, Mahisadal, Haldia, Nandakumar

Source: District Human Development Report, Purba Medinipur, Page 97

=== Pisciculture ===
Purba Medinipur's net district domestic product derives one fifth of its earnings from fisheries, the highest amongst all the districts of West Bengal. The nett area available for effective pisciculture in Bhagabanpur I CD Block in 2013-14 was 900.23 hectares. 5,668 persons were engaged in the profession and approximate annual production was 34,299 quintals.

=== Banking ===
In 2013–14, Bhagabanpur I CD Block had offices of 6 commercial banks and 3 gramin banks.

=== Backward Regions Grant Fund ===
Medinipur East district is listed as a backward region and receives financial support from the Backward Regions Grant Fund. The fund, created by the Government of India, is designed to redress regional imbalances in development. As of 2012, 272 districts across the country were listed under this scheme. The list includes 11 districts of West Bengal.

== Transport ==
Bhagabanpur I CD Block has 2 ferry services and 3 originating/ terminating bus routes.

Deshapran railway station is on the Tamluk-Digha line, constructed in 2003–04.

SH 4 passes through this block.

== Education ==
In 2013–14, Bhagabanpur I CD Block had 159 primary schools with 12,893 students, 12 middle schools with 1,784 students, 9 high schools with 7,435 students and 17 higher secondary schools with 18,798 students. Bhagabanpur I CD Block had 1 general college with 3,235 students and 328 institutions for special and non-formal education with 14,285 students.

As per the 2011 census, in Bhagabanpur I CD block, amongst the 164 inhabited villages, 29 villages did not have a school, 77 villages had two or more primary schools, 42 villages had at least 1 primary and 1 middle school and 25 villages had at least 1 middle and 1 secondary school.

Bajkul Milani Mahavidyalaya was established at Tethi Bari mouza, PO Kismat Bajkul, in 1964. It is affiliated to Vidyasagar University.

== Healthcare ==
In 2014, Bhagabanpur I CD Block had 1 rural hospital, 3 primary health centres and 3 nursing homes with total 60 beds and 5 doctors (excluding private bodies). It had 35 family welfare sub centres.

Bhagabanpur Rural Hospital at Bhagabanpur (with 30 beds) is the main medical facility in Bhagabanpur I CD block. There are primary health centres at Bibhisanpur, Kajlagarh and Seulipur, PO Paschimbarh.
