= Chandipur (community development block) =

Chandipur Nandigram III
- Community development block
- Coordinates: 22.0922°N 87.8562°E
- Country: India
- State: West Bengal
- District: Purba Medinipur

Government
  - Type: Community development block

Area
  - Total: 137.58 km^{2} (53.12 sq mi)
- Elevation: 5 m (16 ft)

Population (2011)
  - Total: 188,119
  - Density: 1,367.3/km^{2} (3,541.4/sq mi)

Languages
  - Official: Bengali, English
- Time zone: UTC+5:30 (IST)
- PIN: 721659 (Math Chandipur)
- Area code: 03228
- ISO 3166 code: IN-WB
- Vehicle registration: WB-29, WB-30, WB-31, WB-32, WB-33
- Literacy: 87.81%
- Lok Sabha constituency: Kanthi
- Vidhan Sabha constituency: Chandipur
- Website: purbamedinipur.gov.in

Chandipur (Caṇḍīpura, Bengali pronunciation: [t͡ʃoɳɖipuɾ]; also referred to as Nandigram III) is a community development block that forms an administrative division in Tamluk subdivision of Purba Medinipur district in the Indian state of West Bengal.

== Geography ==
Purba Medinipur district is part of the lower Indo-Gangetic Plain and Eastern coastal plains. Topographically, the district can be divided into two parts – (a) almost entirely flat plains on the west, east and north, (b) the coastal plains on the south. The vast expanse of land is formed of alluvium and is composed of younger and coastal alluvial. The elevation of the district is within 10 metres above mean sea level. The district has a long coastline of 65.5 km along its southern and south eastern boundary. Five coastal CD Blocks, namely, Khejuri II, Contai II (Deshapran), Contai I, Ramnagar I and II, are occasionally affected by cyclones and tornadoes. Tidal floods are quite regular in these five CD Blocks. Normally floods occur in 21 of the 25 CD Blocks in the district. The major rivers are Haldi, Rupnarayan, Rasulpur, Bagui and Keleghai, flowing in north to south or south-east direction. River water is an important source of irrigation. The district has a low 899 hectare forest cover, which is 0.02% of its geographical area.

Math Chandipur, the largest urban area in the block, is located at 22°05′21″N 87°51′25″E.

Chandipur CD Block is bounded by Nandakumar CD Block in the north, Mahishadal and Nandigram II CD Blocks in the east, Bhagabanpur II CD Block in the south and Bhagabanpur I CD Block in the west.

It is located 27 km from Tamluk, the district headquarters.

Chandipur CD Block has an area of 137.58 km^{2}. It has 1 panchayat samity, 10 gram panchayats, 134 gram sansads (village councils), 114 mouzas and 111 inhabited villages. Chandipur police station serves this block. Headquarters of this CD Block is at Chandipur.

Gram panchayats of Chandipur block/ panchayat samiti are: Brajalalchak, Brindabanpur I, Brindabanpur II, Chowkhali, Dibakarpur, Iswarpur, Jalpai, Kulbari, Nandapur-Baraghuni and Usmanpur.

== Demographics ==
=== Population ===
As per 2011 Census of India Chandipur CD Block had a total population of 188,119, of which 176,704 were rural and 11,415 were urban. There were 97,123 (52%) males and 90,996 (48%) females. Population below 6 years was 23,106. Scheduled Castes numbered 19,095 (10.15%) and Scheduled Tribes numbered 200 (0.11%).

As per 2001 census, Chandipur block had a total population of 159,792, out of which 82,155 were males and 77,637 were females. Chandipur block registered a population growth of 13.43 per cent during the 1991-2001 decade. Decadal growth for the combined Midnapore district was 14.87 per cent. Decadal growth in West Bengal was 17.84 per cent.

Census Towns in Chandipur CD Block (2011 census figures in brackets): Kotbar (6,083) and Erashal (5,332).

Large villages (with 4,000+ population) in Chandipur CD Block (2011 census figures in brackets): Brajalalchak (9,612), Nandapur (7,397), Bara Ghuni (7,000), Khagda (4,827), Jalpai Part I (4,042), Jalpai Part II (3,627) and Kulbari (6,906).

Other villages in Chandipur CD Block (2011 census figures in brackets): Chandipur (2,343), Brindabanpur (2,676), Usmanpur (1,322) and Dibakarpur (3,466).

=== Literacy ===
As per 2011 census the total number of literates in Chandipur CD Block was 144,893 (87.81% of the population over 6 years) out of which 78,686 (54%) were males and 66,207 (46%) were females.

As per 2011 census, literacy in Purba Medinipur district was 87.02%. Purba Medinipur had the highest literacy amongst all the districts of West Bengal in 2011.

See also – List of West Bengal districts ranked by literacy rate

Literacy in CD blocks of
Purba Medinipur district
Tamluk subdivision
Tamluk – 87.06%
Sahid Matangini – 86.99%
Panskura I – 83.65%
Panskura II – 84.93%
Nandakumar – 85.56%
Chandipur – 87.81%
Moyna – 86.33%
Haldia subdivision
Mahishadal – 86.21%
Nandigram I – 84.89%
Nandigram II – 89.16%
Sutahata – 85.42%
Haldia – 85.96%
Contai subdivision
Contai I – 89.32%
Contai II – 88.33%
Contai III – 89.88%
Khejuri I – 88.90%
Khejuri II – 85.37%
Ramnagar I – 87.84%
Ramnagar II – 89.38%
Bhagabanpur II – 90.98%
Egra subdivision
Bhagabanpur I – 88.13%
Egra I – 82.83%
Egra II – 86.47%
Patashpur I – 86.58%
Patashpur II – 86.50%
2011 Census: CD Block Wise

Primary Census Abstract Data

=== Language and religion ===
Religion in Chandipur CD block (2011)
Hinduism	86.07%
Islam	13.85%
Other or not stated	0.08%

In 2011 census Hindus numbered 161,915 and formed 86.07% of the population in Chandipur CD Block. Muslims numbered 26,063 and formed 13.85% of the population. Others numbered 141 and formed 0.08% of the population. In 2001, Hindus made up 87.92% and Muslims 12.02% of the population respectively.

Bengali is the predominant language, spoken by 99.82% of the population.

== Rural poverty ==
The District Human Development Report for Purba Medinipur has provided a CD Block-wise data table for Modified Human Poverty Index of the district. Chandipur CD Block registered 21.84 on the MHPI scale. The CD Block-wise mean MHPI was estimated at 24.78. Eleven out of twentyfive CD Blocks were found to be severely deprived in respect of grand CD Block average value of MHPI (CD Blocks with lower amount of poverty are better): All the CD Blocks of Haldia and Contai subdivisions appeared backward, except Ramnagar I & II, of all the blocks of Egra subdivision only Bhagabanpur I appeared backward and in Tamluk subdivision none appeared backward.

== Economy ==
=== Livelihood ===
In Chandipur CD Block in 2011, total workers formed 36.10% of the total population and amongst the class of total workers, cultivators formed 13.46%, agricultural labourers 40.90%, household industry workers 10.59% and other workers 35.06%.

=== Infrastructure ===
There are 111 inhabited villages in Chandipur CD block. All 111 villages (100%) have power supply. 109 villages (98.2%) have drinking water supply. 18 villages (16.22%) have post offices. 101 villages (90.99%) have telephones (including landlines, public call offices and mobile phones). 23 villages (20.72%) have a pucca (paved) approach road and 35 villages (31.53%) have transport communication (includes bus service, rail facility and navigable waterways). 22 villages (19.82%) have agricultural credit societies. 6 villages (5.41%) have banks.

In 2007-08, around 40% of rural households in the district had electricity.

In 2013-14, there were 23 fertiliser depots, 6 seed stores and 30 fair price shops in the CD Block.

=== Agriculture ===
Persons engaged in agriculture
in Chandipur CD Block
1. Bargadars (13.2%)
2. Patta holders (12.1%)
3. Small farmers (2.27%)
4. Marginal farmers (29.6%)
5. Agricultural labourers (42.8%)

According to the District Human Development Report of Purba Medinipur: The agricultural sector is the lifeline of a predominantly rural economy. It is largely dependent on the Low Capacity Deep Tubewells (around 50%) or High Capacity Deep Tubewells (around 27%) for irrigation, as the district does not have a good network of canals, compared to some of the neighbouring districts. In many cases the canals are drainage canals which get the backflow of river water at times of high tide or the rainy season. The average size of land holding in Purba Medinipur, in 2005-06, was 0.73 hectares against 1.01 hectares in West Bengal.

In 2013-14, the total area irrigated in Chandipur CD Block was 5,390 hectares, out of which 130 hectares were irrigated with canal water, 2,350 hectares by tank water and 2,910 hectares by deep tube wells.

Although the Bargadari Act of 1950 recognised the rights of bargadars to a higher share of crops from the land that they tilled, it was not implemented fully. Large tracts, beyond the prescribed limit of land ceiling, remained with the rich landlords. From 1977 onwards major land reforms took place in West Bengal. Land in excess of land ceiling was acquired and distributed amongst the peasants. Following land reforms land ownership pattern has undergone transformation. In 2013-14, persons engaged in agriculture in Chandipur CD Block could be classified as follows: bargadars 13.22%, patta (document) holders 12.06%, small farmers (possessing land between 1 and 2 hectares) 2.27%, marginal farmers (possessing land up to 1 hectare) 29.60% and agricultural labourers 42.84%.

In 2013-14, Chandipur CD Block produced 773 tonnes of Aman paddy, the main winter crop, from 2,248 hectares, 8,682 tonnes of Boro paddy, the spring crop, from 2,462 hectares, 593 tonnes of Aus paddy, the summer crop, from 1,243 hectares, 27 tonnes of jute from 2 hectares and 3,354 tonnes of potatoes from 121 hectares. It also produced pulses and oil seeds.

Betelvine is a major source of livelihood in Purba Medinipur district, particularly in Tamluk and Contai subdivisions. Betelvine production in 2008-09 was the highest amongst all the districts and was around a third of the total state production. In 2008-09, Purba Mednipur produced 2,789 tonnes of cashew nuts from 3,340 hectares of land.

Concentration of Handicraft Activities in CD Blocks
- Horn Craft - Kolaghat
- Pata Chitra - Chandipur, Nandakumar
- Sea Shell – Ramnagar I & II
- Mat & Mat Diversified Products – Ramnagar I, Egra I & II, Patashpur I
- Brass & Bell Metal – Ramnagar I, Mahisadal, Patashpur II, Egra I
- Diversified Jute Products – Ramnagar II, Nandakumar, Kolaghat, Shahid Matangini
- Cane & Bamboo Products - Chandipur, Nandakumar, Kolaghat, Shahid Matangini
- Sola Craft - Tamluk, Kolaghat
- Pottery/Terracotta - Panskura, Tamluk, Sahid Matangini, Nandakumar
- Wood Craft - Tamluk
- Zari work - Sutahta, Mahisadal, Haldia, Nandakumar

Source: District Human Development Report, Purba Medinipur, Page 97

=== Pisciculture ===
Purba Medinipur's net district domestic product derives one fifth of its earnings from fisheries, the highest amongst all the districts of West Bengal. The nett area available for effective pisciculture in Chandipur CD Block in 2013-14 was 1050.00 hectares. 6,440 persons were engaged in the profession and approximate annual production was 40,005 quintals.

=== Banking ===
In 2013-14, Chandipur CD Block had offices of 6 commercial banks and 1 gramin bank.

=== Backward Regions Grant Fund ===
Medinipur East district is listed as a backward region and receives financial support from the Backward Regions Grant Fund. The fund, created by the Government of India, is designed to redress regional imbalances in development. As of 2012, 272 districts across the country were listed under this scheme. The list includes 11 districts of West Bengal.

== Transport ==
Chandipur CD Block has 6 originating/ terminating bus routes.

Lavan Satygraha Smarak railway station is a station on the Tamluk-Digha line, constructed in 2003-04.

SH 4 connecting Jhalda (in Purulia district) and Digha (in Purba Medinipur district) passes through Chandipur.

== Education ==
In 2013-14, Chandipur CD Block had 121 primary schools with 9,247 students, 3 middle schools with 530 students, 15 high schools with 7,339 students and 16 higher secondary schools with 16,672 students. Chandipur CD Block had 1 technical/ professional institution with 99 students, 283 institutions for special and non-formal education with 12,890 students.

As per the 2011 census, in Chandipur CD block, amongst the 111 inhabited villages, 9 villages did not have a school, 48 villages had two or more primary schools, 33 villages had at least 1 primary and 1 middle school and 25 villages had at least 1 middle and 1 secondary school.

== Healthcare ==
In 2014, Chandipur CD Block had 1 block primary health centre, 2 primary health centres, and 8 private nursing homes with total 165 beds and 5 doctors (excluding private bodies). It had 28 family welfare sub centres. 2,786 patients were treated indoor and 113,257 patients were treated outdoor in the hospitals, health centres and subcentres of the CD Block. A

Erashal Rural Hospital at Erashal, PO Math Chandipur (with 30 beds) is the main medical facility in Chandipur CD block. There are primary health centres at Gokhuri, PO Majnaberia (with 2 beds) and Baraghuni (with 10 beds). A multispeciality hospital is also functional in Chandipur.
