= Patashpur =

- Town
- Location in West Bengal, India Patashpur (India)
- Coordinates: 22°01′17.8″N 87°32′32.3″E
- Country: India
- State: West Bengal
- District: Purba Medinipur

Population (2011)
  - Total: 200,000

Languages
  - Official: Bengali, English
- Time zone: UTC+5:30 (IST)
- PIN: 721439 (Patashpur)
- Lok Sabha constituency: Kanthi
- Vidhan Sabha constituency: Patashpur
- Website: purbamedinipur.gov.in

Patashpur is a Town in Patashpur II CD block in patashpur Police Station of Purba Medinipur district in the state of West Bengal, India.

== History ==
According to Binoy Ghosh, the Bargis ruled in Patashpur for many years. At that time Patashpur was not in Medinipur district. In 1760, Medinipur district came under control of the East India Company, and the Bargis used Patashpur as a base for looting the Medinipur area. In 1803, Odisha, along with Patashpur, came under control of the British.

== Geography ==
Cities and towns in Egra subdivision of Purba Medinipur district
M: municipal city/ town, CT: census town, R: rural/ urban centre, H: historical/ religious centre.
Owing to space constraints in the small map, the actual locations in a larger map may vary slightly

=== Police station ===
Patashpur police station has jurisdiction over Patashpur I and Patashpur II CD blocks. Patashpur police station covers an area of 354.09 km^{2} with a population of 302,153. The police station is located at Kasba Patashpur.

=== Urbanisation ===
96.96% of the population of Egra subdivision live in the rural areas. Only 3.04% of the population live in the urban areas, and that is the lowest proportion of urban population amongst the four subdivisions in Purba Medinipur district.

Note: The map alongside presents some of the notable locations in the subdivision. All places marked in the map are linked in the larger full screen map.

== Demographics ==
As per the map of Patashpur II CD block and subsequent alphabetical list of villages in the District Census Handbook, Purba Medinipur, Patashpur is a part of Kasbapatapur village.

As per 2011 Census of India Kasbapatapur had a total population of 5,853 of which 3,037 (52%) were males and 2,816 (48%) were females. Population below 6 years was 918. The total number of literates in Kasbapatapur was 3,769 (76.37% of the population over 6 years).

== Transport ==
The Patashpur-Temathani Road meets Egra-Patashpur-Amarshi-Bhagabanpur-Bajkul Road at Patashpur.

== Healthcare ==
Patashpur Rural Hospital at Patashpur (with 30 beds) is the main medical facility in Patashpur II CD block. There are primary health centres at Pratapdighi (with 10 beds) and Argoal (with 10 beds).
