= Brajalalchak =

- Village
- Location in West Bengal, India Brajalalchak (India)
- Coordinates: 22°03′52.6″N 87°51′34.3″E
- Country: India
- State: West Bengal
- District: Purba Medinipur

Population (2011)
  - Total: 6,366

Languages
  - Official: Bengali, English
- Time zone: UTC+5:30 (IST)
- PIN: 721659
- Telephone/STD code: 03228
- Lok Sabha constituency: Tamluk
- Vidhan Sabha constituency: Haldia
- Website: purbamedinipur.gov.in

Brajalalchak is a village, in HaldiaCD Block in Haldia subdivision of Purba Medinipur district in the state of West Bengal, India. It is located on NH-41 and marks the entry to Haldia.

== Demographics ==
As per 2011 Census of India Brajalalchak had a total population of 6,366 of which 3,311 (52%) were males and 3,055 (48%) were females. Population below 6 years was 779. The total number of literates in Brajalalchak was 4,875 (87.26% of the population over 6 years).

== Transport ==
SH 4 connecting Jhalda (in Purulia district) and Digha (in Purba Medinipur district) passes through Brajalalchak.
