= Pratapdighi =

- Village
- Location in West Bengal, India Pratapdighi (India)
- Coordinates: 21°59′11.8″N 87°36′08.3″E
- Country: India
- State: West Bengal
- District: Purba Medinipur

Population (2011)
  - Total: 3,046

Languages
  - Official: Bengali, Hindi, English
- Time zone: UTC+5:30 (IST)
- PIN: 721440 (Pratapdighi)
- Lok Sabha constituency: Kanthi
- Vidhan Sabha constituency: Patashpur
- Website: purbamedinipur.gov.in

Pratapdighi is a village in Patashpur II CD block in Egra subdivision of Purba Medinipur district in the state of West Bengal, India.

== Geography ==
Cities and towns in Egra subdivision of Purba Medinipur district
M: municipal city/ town, CT: census town, R: rural/ urban centre, H: historical/ religious centre.
Owing to space constraints in the small map, the actual locations in a larger map may vary slightly

=== Location ===
Pratapdighi is located at 21°59′11.8″N 87°36′08.3″E.

=== CD block HQ ===
The headquarters of Patashpur II CD block are located at Pratapdighi.

=== Urbanisation ===
96.96% of the population of Egra subdivision live in the rural areas. Only 3.04% of the population live in the urban areas, and that is the lowest proportion of urban population amongst the four subdivisions in Purba Medinipur district.

Note: The map alongside presents some of the notable locations in the subdivision. All places marked in the map are linked in the larger full screen map.

== Demographics ==
As per 2011 Census of India Pratapdighi had a total population of 3,046 of which 1,560 (51%) were males and 1,486 (49%) were females. Population before 6 years was 363. The total number of literates in Pratapdighi was 2,329 (86.81% of the population over 6 years).

== Transport ==
The Lalat-Janka Road passes through Pratapdighi, which connects the village with Khraimore, Argoal, Itaberia. Nowadays lots of buses are available on Howrah Kolkata Digha Contai route. Pratapdighi Bridge known as Rajendra Setu has a very important role in total transportation via Lalat Janka Road.

== Healthcare ==
There is a primary health centre at Pratapdighi (with 10 beds).
