= Kajlagarh =

- Village
- Location in West Bengal, India Kajlagarh (India)
- Coordinates: 22.0343°N 87.7986°E
- Country: India
- State: West Bengal
- District: Purba Medinipur

Languages
  - Official: Bengali, English
- Time zone: UTC+5:30 (IST)
- PIN: 721626
- Lok Sabha constituency: Kanthi
- Vidhan Sabha constituency: Bhagabanpur
- Website: purbamedinipur.gov.in

Kajlagarh is a village and a gram panchayat in Bhagabanpur I CD block in Egra subdivision of Purba Medinipur district in the state of West Bengal, India.

== History ==
Kajlagarh or "Sujamutha" was a historic Kingdom ruled by the Mahishya Chowdhury family under the suzerainty of the powerful Hijli state. About nearly 400 hundred years ago the ruling house was founded by one Govardhan Ranajhamp, a local Mahishya chieftain, and a descendant of Raja Haridas, was bestowed upon the honorific title Chowdhury, by the Nawab of Gauḍa, for the military and administrative services he rendered to him. He was succeeded by his subsequent generations such as Madhab Chandra, Sri Narayan, Gopal Narayan, Gorachand et cetera. Mahendra Narayan, his 10th generation descendant is credited with the establishment of the "Nabaratna" and "Rajprasada" in Kajlagarh in 1769 AD. Mahendra Narayan is also, recorded to have donated lands to the Mahanta Goswamis of Gopiballavpur. The next king, Debendra Narayan granted lands to many Brahmins and learned scholars, notable among them was Ramkanai Vachaspati. Unfortunately in 1860 AD, due to the absence of male heirs the kingdom was annexed by the Court of Wards, and male heirs from cadet branches were not allowed to succeed, consequently the Zamindari purchased by the Queen Narayan Kumari Devi of Bardhaman Raj. However, the descendants of the royal family still live in the area.

The poet and playwright, Dwijendralal Ray, was posted here as a revenue officer for the Court of Wards in the division in 1890.

== Geography ==
Cities and towns in Egra subdivision of Purba Medinipur district
M: municipal city/ town, CT: census town, R: rural/ urban centre, H: historical/ religious centre.
Owing to space constraints in the small map, the actual locations in a larger map may vary slightly

=== Location ===
Kajlagarh is located at 22.0343°N 87.7986°E.

=== Urbanisation ===
96.96% of the population of Egra subdivision live in the rural areas. Only 3.04% of the population live in the urban areas, and that is the lowest proportion of urban population amongst the four subdivisions in Purba Medinipur district.

== Civic administration ==
=== CD block HQ ===
The headquarters of Bhagabanpur I CD block are located at Kajlagarh.

== Transport ==
Kajlagarh is on Egra-Bajkul Road.

The nearest railway station, Deshapran railway station, is on the Tamluk-Digha line, constructed in 2003–04.

== Education ==
Bajkul Milani Mahavidyalaya was established at Tethi Bari mouza, PO Kismat Bajkul, in 1964. It is affiliated to Vidyasagar University.

== Culture ==
David J. McCutchion mentions the Gopala temple as an 18th-century West Bengal Navaratna, measuring 35' 3" square, having slight terracotta.

== Kajlagarh picture gallery ==
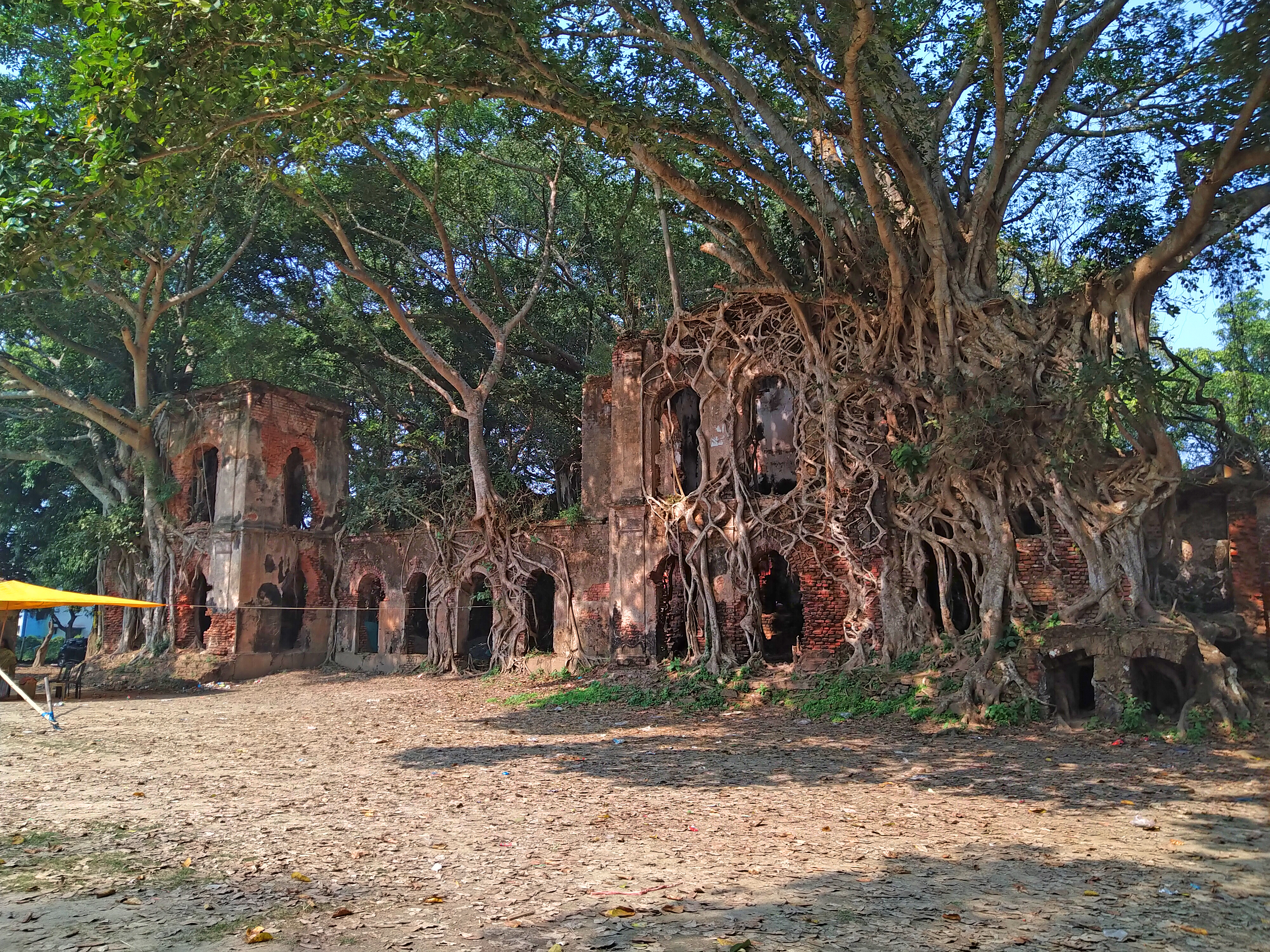
Rajbari temple

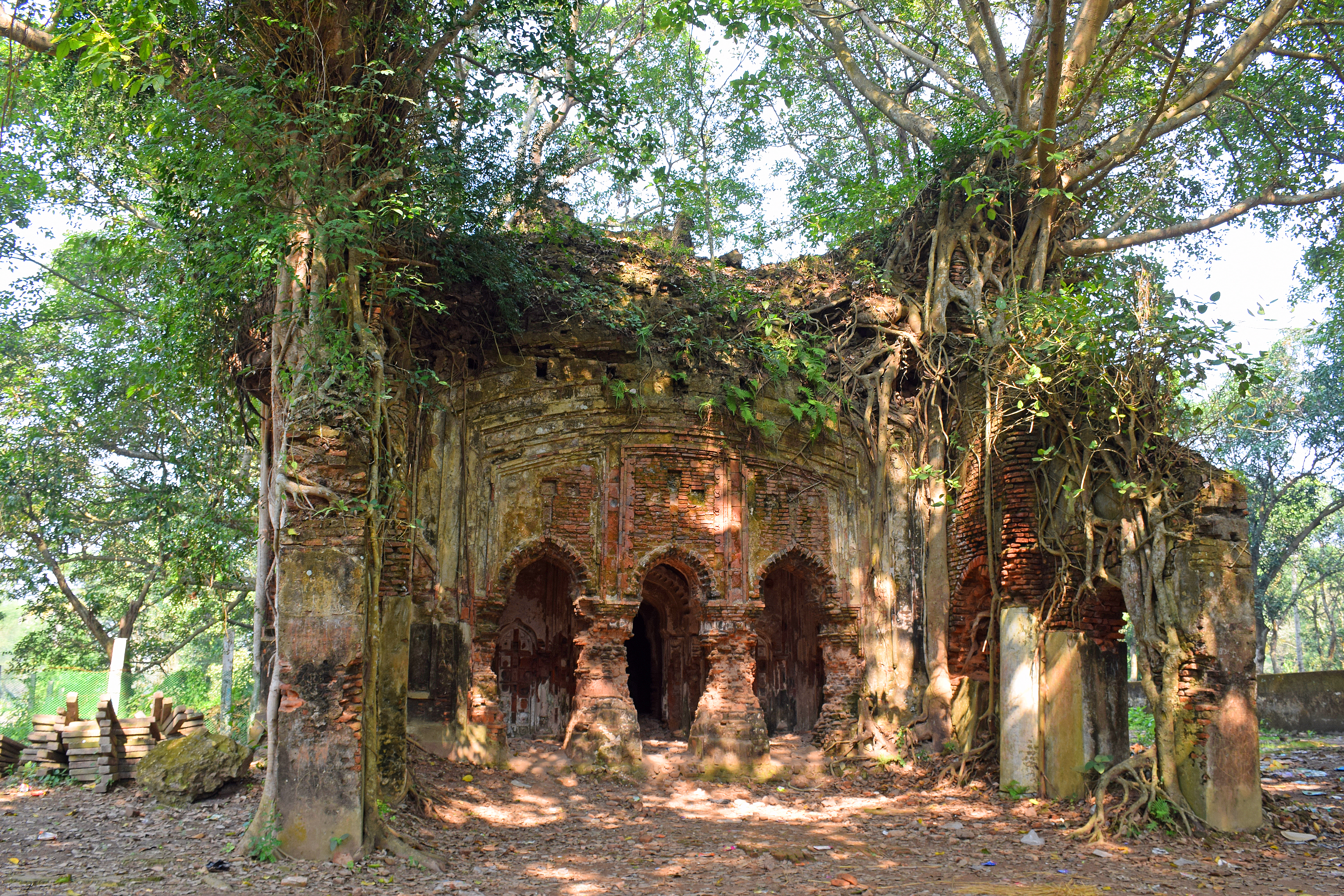
Gopala temple of Chowdhury family

== Healthcare ==
There is a primary health centre at Kajlagarh (with 6 beds).
