= Tethi Bari =

- Village
- Location in West Bengal, India Tethi Bari (India)
- Coordinates: 22.0373°N 87.8075°E
- Country: India
- State: West Bengal
- District: Purba Medinipur

Population (2011)
  - Total: 2,420

Languages
  - Official: Bengali, English
- Time zone: UTC+5:30 (IST)
- Lok Sabha constituency: Kanthi
- Vidhan Sabha constituency: Bhagabanpur
- Website: purbamedinipur.gov.in

Tethi Bari is a village, in Bhagabanpur I CD Block in Egra subdivision of Purba Medinipur district in the state of West Bengal, India.

== Geography ==
Cities and towns in Egra subdivision of Purba Medinipur district
M: municipal city/ town, CT: census town, R: rural/ urban centre, H: historical/ religious centre.
Owing to space constraints in the small map, the actual locations in a larger map may vary slightly

=== Location ===
Tethi Bari is located at 22.0373°N 87.8075°E.

=== Urbanisation ===
96.96% of the population of Egra subdivision live in the rural areas. Only 3.04% of the population live in the urban areas, and that is the lowest proportion of urban population amongst the four subdivisions in Purba Medinipur district.

Note: The map alongside presents some of the notable locations in the subdivision. All places marked in the map are linked in the larger full screen map.

== Demographics ==
As per 2011 Census of India Tethi Bari had a total population of 2,420 of which 1,259 (52%) were males and 1,161 (48%) were females. Population below 6 years was 268. The total number of literates in Tethi Bari was 2,022 (93.96 % of the population over 6 years).

== Transport ==
Deshapran railway station, located nearby, is on the Tamluk-Digha line, constructed in 2003-04.

== Education ==
Bajkul Milani Mahavidyalaya was established at Tethibari mouza, PO Kismat Bajkul, in 1964. It is affiliated to Vidyasagar University.

== Healthcare ==
There is primary health centres at Kajlagarh (with 6 beds).
