= Kismat Bajkul =

- Village
- Location in West Bengal, India Kismat Bajkul (India)
- Coordinates: 22.0173°N 87.8115°E
- Country: India
- State: West Bengal
- District: Purba Medinipur

Population (2011)
  - Total: 17,964

Languages
  - Official: Bengali, English
- Time zone: UTC+5:30 (IST)
- Lok Sabha constituency: Kanthi
- Vidhan Sabha constituency: Bhagabanpur
- Website: purbamedinipur.gov.in

Kismat Bajkul is a village, in Bhagabanpur I CD block in Egra subdivision of Purba Medinipur district in the state of West Bengal, India.

== Geography ==
Cities and towns in Egra subdivision of Purba Medinipur district
M: municipal city/ town, CT: census town, R: rural/ urban centre, H: historical/ religious centre.
Owing to space constraints in the small map, the actual locations in a larger map may vary slightly

=== Location ===
Kismat Bajkul is located at 22.0173°N 87.8115°E.

=== Urbanisation ===
96.96% of the population of Egra subdivision live in the rural areas. Only 3.04% of the population live in the urban areas, and that is the lowest proportion of urban population amongst the four subdivisions in Purba Medinipur district.

Note: The map alongside presents some of the notable locations in the subdivision. All places marked in the map are linked in the larger full screen map.

== Demographics ==
As per 2011 Census of India Kismat Bajkul had a total population of 17,964 of which 9,306 (52%) were males and 8,658 (48%) were females. Population below 6 years was 1994. The total number of literates in Kismat Bajkul was 14,781 (92.55 % of the population over 6 years).

== Transport ==
SH 4 connecting Jhalda (in Purulia district) and Digha (in Purba Medinipur district) passes through Kismat Bajkul.

The nearest railway station is Deshapran railway station situated on the Tamluk-Digha line, constructed in 2003-04.

== Education ==
Bajkul Milani Mahavidyalaya was established at Tethi Bari mouza, PO Kismat Bajkul, pin-721655, in 1964. It is affiliated to Vidyasagar University.

== Healthcare ==
There is primary health centres at Kajlagarh (with 6 beds).
