= List of villages in Purba Medinipur district =

This is an alphabetical list of villages in Purba Medinipur district, West Bengal, India.

== A–C ==
- Astichak
- Alangiri
- Bara Bankuya
- Baratala
- Bathuary
- Bargoda
- Balighai
- Bhabanipur
- Bhagabanpur
- Bhogpur
- Bhupatinagar
- Brajalalchak
- Chaitanyapur
- Chak Srikrishnapur
- Chandipur
- Chatara

== D ==
- Daisai
- Dakshin Maynadal
- Dalimbachak
- Dariapur
- Depal
- Dholmari
- Dihibahiri
- Durmut

== G–J ==
- Gangadharbar
- Geonkhali
- Golara Nij
- Jabda
- Janka
- Janu Basan
- Jukhia
- Junput

== Kukurmuri ==
- Kajlagarh
- Kalaberia
- Kamarda
- Kharipukuria
- Khejuri
- Kishorchak
- Kismat Bajkul
- Kukrahati

== M–P ==
- Madhabpur
- Mahishadal
- Majna
- Mandarmani
- Marishda
- Moyna
- Namalbarh
- Nandakumar
- Nayachar
- Palpara
- Panchetgarh
- Panchrol
- Patashpur
- Pratapdighi
- Purbba Gopalpur

== R–U ==
- Ramchandrapur
- Ramnagar
- Reyepara
- Shankarpur
- Shipur
- Shyamsundarpur Patna
- Silaberia
- Sona Chura
- Srigouri
- Srikantha
- Sutahata
- Tethi Bari
- Tilkhoja
- Uttar Mechogram
