= Amarshi Kasba =

Census town in West Bengal, India

- Census Town
- Location in West Bengal, India Amarshi Kasba (India)
- Coordinates: 22°03′47.2″N 87°36′08.6″E
- Country: India
- State: West Bengal
- District: Purba Medinipur

Population (2011)
  - Total: 6,400

Languages
  - Official: Bengali, English
- Time zone: UTC+5:30 (IST)
- PIN: 721454 (Amarshi)
- Telephone/STD code: 03229
- Lok Sabha constituency: Kanthi
- Vidhan Sabha constituency: Patashpur
- Website: purbamedinipur.gov.in

Amarshi Kasba is a census town in Patashpur I CD block in Egra subdivision of Purba Medinipur district in the state of West Bengal, India.

== History ==
Binoy Ghosh notes that during the Muslim rule, the word 'Kasba', meaning human settlement, was attached to the names of many villages. Kasba-i-Amarshi was one of them. There is a popular folklore about the place. There was once a king named Amar Singh. He was very oppressive and did not even treat his subjects as human beings. He also was a Muslim-hater. At the entrance gate of his palace, footwear of his was hung, the objective being that visitors to the palace would first show respect to the footwear and then enter the palace. Towards the end of the 17th century, Makdum Saheb of the Chishti Order was visiting Bengal. One day, he came to visit the king, and as usual was asked to show respect to the footwear hung at the gate. He refused and a fight ensued, in which not only the guards, but also the king was killed. The news of Makdum Saheb's bravery spread fast and the oppressed subjects felt relieved.

== Geography ==
Cities and towns in Egra subdivision of Purba Medinipur district
M: municipal city/ town, CT: census town, R: rural/ urban centre, H: historical/ religious centre.
Owing to space constraints in the small map, the actual locations in a larger map may vary slightly

=== CD block HQ ===
The headquarters of Patashpur I CD block are located at Amarshi Kasba.

=== Urbanisation ===
96.96% of the population of Egra subdivision live in the rural areas. Only 3.04% of the population live in the urban areas, and that is the lowest proportion of urban population amongst the four subdivisions in Purba Medinipur district.

Note: The map alongside presents some of the notable locations in the subdivision. All places marked in the map are linked in the larger full screen map.

== Demographics ==
As per 2011 Census of India Amarshi Kasba had a total population of 6,400 of which 3,275 (51%) were males and 3,125 (49%) were females. Population below 6 years was 835. The total number of literates in Amarshi Kasba was 4,306 (77.38% of the population over 6 years).

== Infrastructure ==
As per the District Census Handbook 2011, Amarshi Kasba covered an area of 0.8253 km^{2}. It had the facility of a railway station at Balichak 52 km away and bus routes in the town. Amongst the civic amenities it had 10 road lighting points and 350 domestic electric connections. Amongst the medical facilities it had a hospital 3 km away and 11 medicine shops in the town. Amongst the educational facilities it had were 6 primary schools, 2 secondary schools and 1 senior secondary school. The nearest degree college was at Palpara 10 km away. Amongst the recreational and cultural facilities, a public library and a reading room were there in the town.

== Transport ==
The Egra-Patashpur-Amarshi-Bhagabanpur-Bajkul Road passes through Amarshi Kasba.

== Education ==
The nearest degree college, Yogoda Satsanga Palpara Mahavidyalaya at Palpara, was established in 1964.

== Healthcare ==
Gonara Block Primary Health Centre at Golara Nij, PO Manglamaro (with 10 beds), the main medical facility in Patashpur I CD block, is located nearby.
