= Dihibahiri =

Dihibahiri Dihi Bahiri
- Village
- Location in West Bengal, India Dihibahiri (India)
- Coordinates: 21.8569°N 87.7755°E
- Country: India
- State: West Bengal
- District: Purba Medinipur

Population (2011)
  - Total: 161

Languages
  - Official: Bengali, English
- Time zone: UTC+5:30 (IST)
- Lok Sabha constituency: Kanthi
- Vidhan Sabha constituency: Kanthi Uttar
- Website: purbamedinipur.gov.in

Dihibahiri is a village in the Contai III CD block in the Contai subdivision of the Purba Medinipur district in the state of West Bengal, India.

== History ==
When the largest man-made waterbody in the area, Bhimsagar, was being dug, many antiquities were recovered and some were believed to belong to the Shunga-Kushan era (around 1st BC to 1st century AD). Much later, the Contai area was a part of the Hijli Kingdom, which existed between 1687 and 1886.

== Geography ==
Cities and towns in Contai subdivision of Purba Medinipur district
M: municipal city/ town, CT: census town, R: rural/ urban centre, centre, H: historical/ religious S: port, sea-beach
Owing to space constraints in the small map, the actual locations in a larger map may vary slightly

=== Location ===
Dihibahiri is located at 21.8569°N 87.7755°E.

Marishda is about 10 km from Contai on the Contai-Nandakumar Road (National Highway 116B). Dihibahiri is linked with Marishda by a short stretch of local roads.

Note: The map alongside presents some of the notable locations in the subdivision. All places marked in the map are linked in the larger full screen map.

== Demographics ==
According to the 2011 Census of India, Dihibahiri had a total population of 161, of which 79 (49%) were males and 82 (51%) were females.

== Culture ==
According to the board put up by the Archaeological Survey of India at Dihibahiri, the temple of Jagannath was built in 1584. It further says that it was heard that Bhimsen Mahapatra, King of Odisha, built this temple. It is a rekha-type structure with jagmohana (pirha type) in the front. (A picture of the board is provided. It can be enlarged to verify the information).

Dihibahiri Jagannath temple is a state protected monument.

== Dihibahiri picture gallery ==
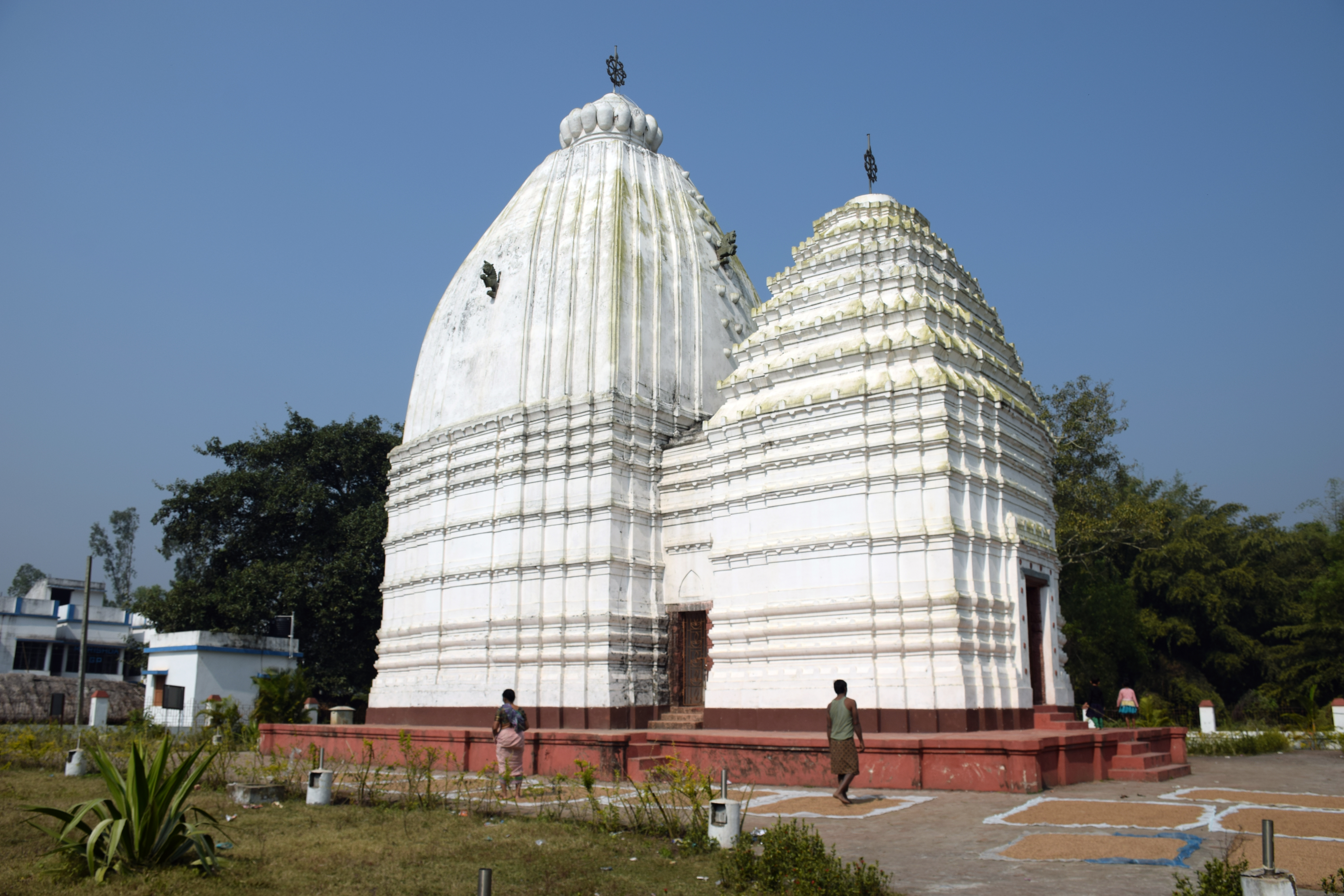
Jagannath deul temple

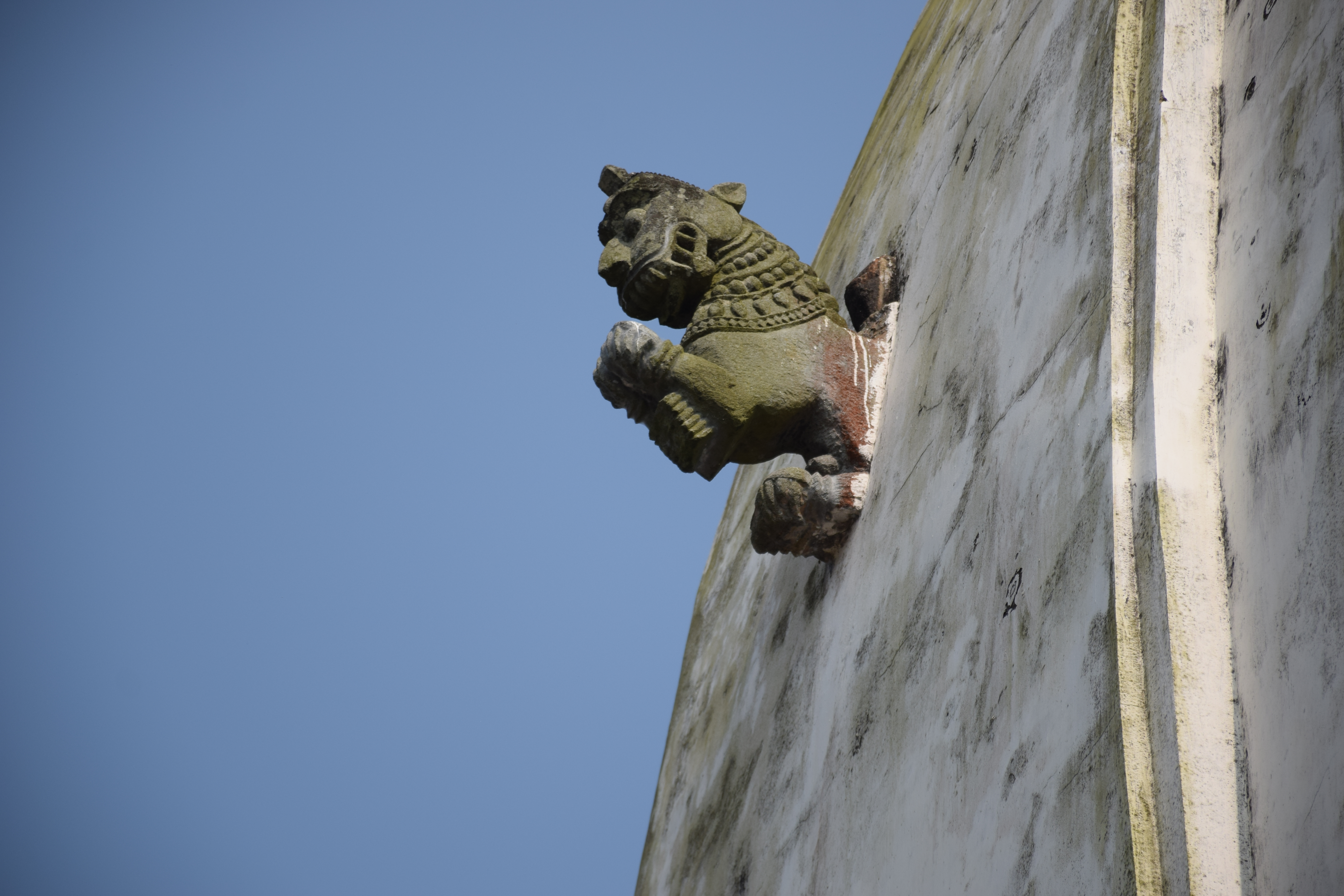
Jumping lion on the temple wall

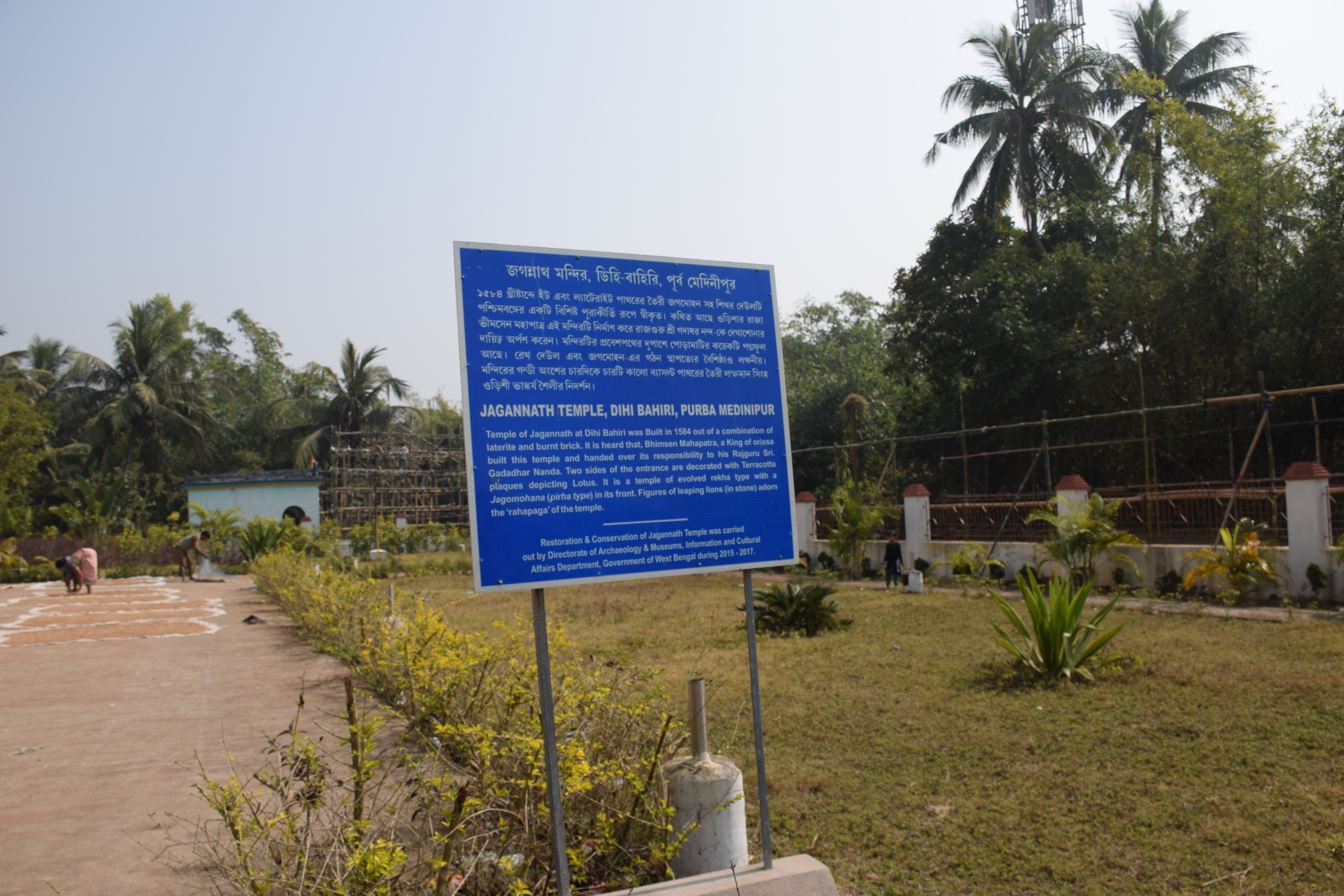
ASI information board

== Healthcare ==
Kharipukuria Block Primary Health Centre at Kharipukuria, PO Nachinda Bazar (with 10 beds) is the main government medical facility in Contai III CD block.
