= Dakshin Baguan =

- Census Town
- Location in West Bengal, India Dakshin Baguan (India)
- Coordinates: 22.32°N 87.83°E
- Country: India
- State: West Bengal
- District: Purba Medinipur

Area
  - Total: 0.64 km^{2} (0.25 sq mi)

Population (2011)
  - Total: 5,180
  - Density: 8,100/km^{2} (21,000/sq mi)

Languages
  - Official: Bengali, English
- Time zone: UTC+5:30 (IST)
- PIN: 721653
- Vehicle registration: WB
- Lok Sabha constituency: Tamluk
- Vidhan Sabha constituency: Tamluk
- Website: purbamedinipur.gov.in

Dakshin Baguan is a census town in Tamluk CD Block in Purba Medinipur district in the state of West Bengal, India.

== Geography ==
Cities and towns in Tamluk subdivision of Purba Medinipur district
M: municipal city/ town, CT: census town, R: rural/ urban centre, H: historical/ religious centre
Owing to space constraints in the small map, the actual locations in a larger map may vary slightly

=== Location ===
Dakshin Baguan is located at 22.32°N 87.83°E.

=== Urbanisation ===
94.08% of the population of Tamluk subdivision live in the rural areas. Only 5.92% of the population live in the urban areas, and that is the second lowest proportion of urban population amongst the four subdivisions in Purba Medinipur district, just above Egra subdivision.

Note: The map alongside presents some of the notable locations in the subdivision. All places marked in the map are linked in the larger full screen map.

== Demographics ==
As per 2011 Census of India Dakshin Baguan had a total population of 5,180 of which 2,705 (52%) were males and 2,475 (48%) were females. Population below 6 years was 696. The total number of literates in Dakshin Baguan was 4,074 (90.86% of the population over 6 years).

== Infrastructure ==
As per the District Census Handbook 2011, Dakshin Baguan covered an area of 0.64 km^{2}. It had bus routes in the town. Amongst the civic amenities it had 50 road light points and 900 domestic electric connections. Amongst the medical facilities it had 4 nursing homes with 40 beds and 15 medicine shops in the town. Amongst the educational facilities it had were 4 primary schools, 1 middle school, 1 secondary school and 1 senior secondary school in the town. The nearest degree college was at Tamluk 12 km away. Amongst the recreational and cultural facilities a cinema theatre was there at Radhamani 5 km away and an auditorium/ community hall was there in the town.

== Transport ==
Dakshin Baguan is on State Highway 4.

== Education ==
Chanserpur High School, PO Chanserpur, is a Bengali-medium boys only higher secondary school, established in 1914. It has arrangements for teaching from class VI to XII. It has a library and a play ground.

Ananatapur Bani Niketan Girls High School is a girls only higher secondary school affiliated to the West Bengal Council of Higher Secondary Education.

== Healthcare ==
Anantapur Rural Hospital at Anantapur, PO Chanserpur (with 30 beds) is the main medical facility in Tamluk CD block.
