= Kishorchak =

Village in West Bengal, India

Kishorchak is a village in Bhogpur (Purba Medinipur) Gram panchayat in Kolaghat block of Tamluk sub-division of Purba Medinipur district in the state of West Bengal. Nearest town is Panskura.The village is surrounded by Namalbarh in west side, Bhogpur (Purba Medinipur) in east side and South Eastern Railway Zone in north and Kaminachak village in south. This village is situated near Bhogpur railway station. This railway station is main mode of transport for this village as well as other neighbouring village. Though NH6 is 5 km away from this village but people this village used it for only goods transportation, because there is no mode of public transport is available through NH6 from this village. Kishorchak Banamali High School is situated in the western side of the village and also a Bengali medium primary school is located in same side was established in 1927.

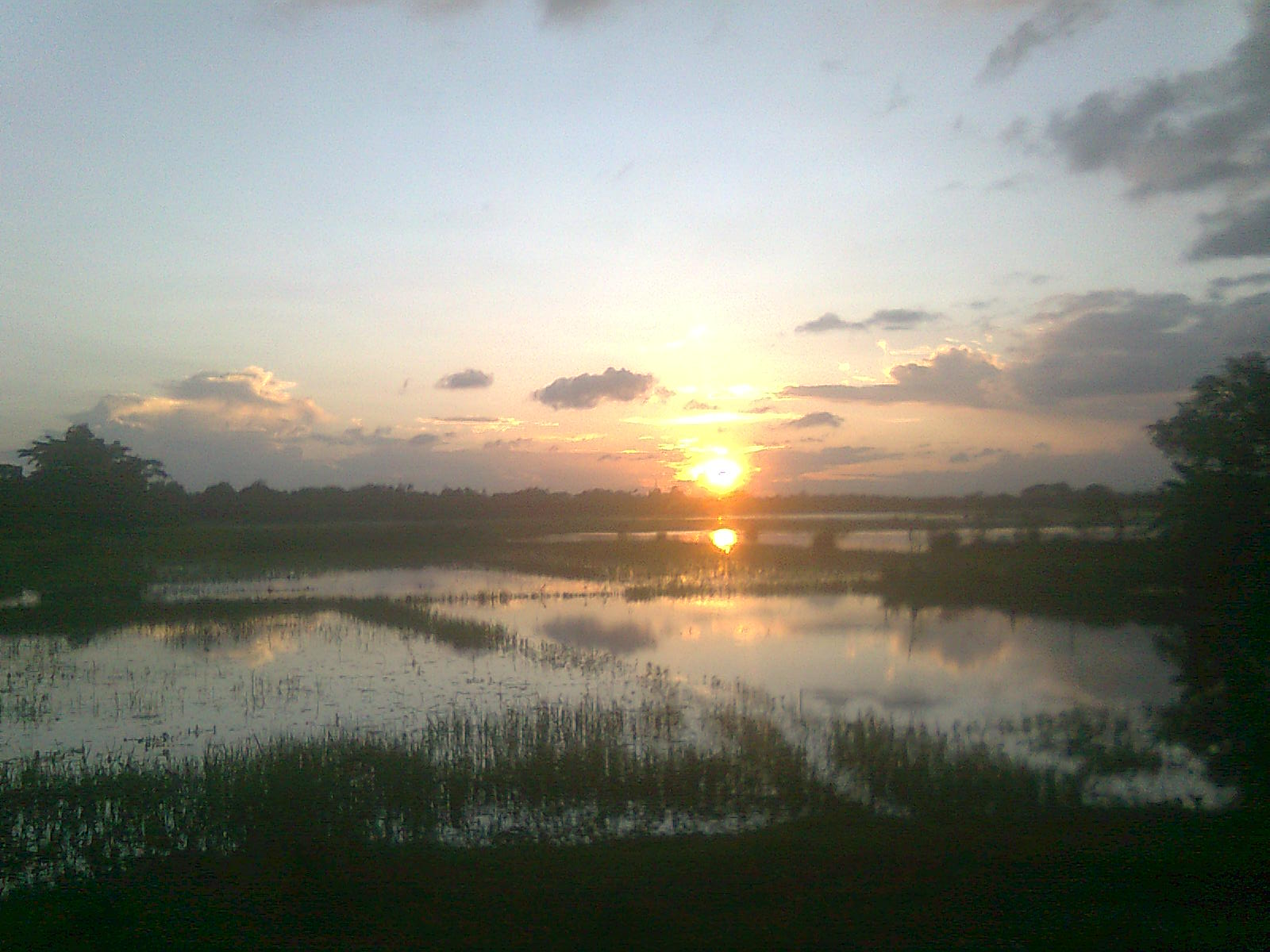
Sun set in village of Kishorchak

== Festival ==
The villagers used to have lot of festival. Charak festival or Charak Puja is used to take place in the last day of every Bengali year that is the last day of Choitro month in this village and for this a holy Gajan (festival) is celebrated for the last 7 days of the Bengali year and in the last day it commit with the Charak festival. This Charak festival started in the 1950s and is still celebrated with same passion and holiness. This festival is very popular in this zone, the villager from other side are used to take part in this festival. A fair is used to rake place in this occasion in the afternoon of the Cahitra Sankranti. Nearly 25000 – 30000 people come to see the single day fair. After this festival villagers welcome the New Year in the night with some kind of cultural activity. They celebrate Pohela Boishakh with the traditional way, the traditional greeting for Bengali New Year is "Shubho Noboborsho" (Bengali: শুভ নববর্ষ). people wear new clothes and go about socialising. Prayers are offered for the well-being and prosperity of the family.

Durga Puja, Holi, Jagaddhatri puja, Ganesh Chaturthi, Maha Shivaratri, Makar Sankranti, Krishna Janmashtami, Rama Navami, Raksha Bandhan, Diwali, Basanti Puja are the other Hindu festival is celebrated here.

Maximum population of the village is Hindu but a few Muslims community are there and they also celebrate Eid al-Fitr and other Islamic festivals.
