= Narayan Pakuria Murail railway station =

Railway station in West Bengal, India

Narayan Pakuria Murail

General information
- Location: Canal Road, Panskura, Purba Medinipur district, West Bengal; India
- Coordinates: 22°23′59″N 87°46′27″E
- Elevation: 5 metres (16 ft)
- System: Kolkata Suburban Railway station
- Owner: Indian Railways
- Line: Howrah–Kharagpur line
- Platforms: 2

Construction
- Structure type: Standard on-ground station
- Parking: No
- Cycle facilities: yes

Other information
- Station code: NPMR
- Fare zone: South Eastern Railway

History
- Opened: 1900
- Electrified: 1967–69

Services
Preceding station	Kolkata Suburban Railway	Following station
Panskura Junction towards Midnapore	South Eastern Line Howrah–Kharagpur line	Bhogpur towards Howrah Junction
Route map
Location
- Location within West Bengal

The Narayan Pakuria Murail railway station in the Indian state of West Bengal, serves Murail, India in Purba Medinipur district. It is on the Howrah–Kharagpur line. It is 67 km (42 mi) from Howrah Station.

== History ==
It is a small railway station between Howrah and Kharagpur. Local EMU trains stop here. The Howrah–Kharagpur line was opened in 1900. The Howrah–Panskura stretch has three lines. The Howrah–Kharagpur line was electrified in 1967–69.
