= Contai III =

- Community development block
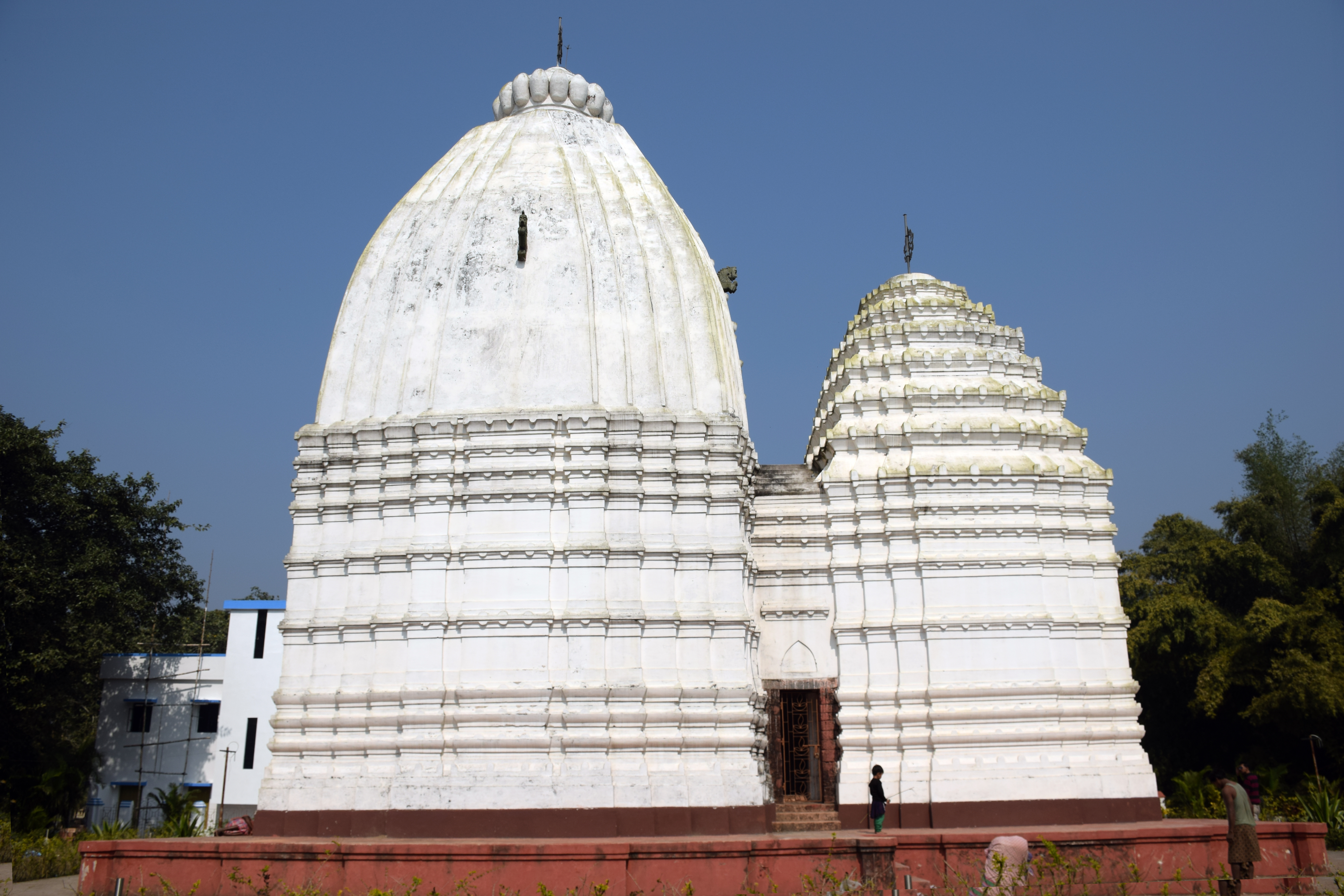
- Jagannath deul at Dihibahiri built in 1584

- Location in West Bengal, India
- Coordinates: 21.8235763°N 87.7285767°E
- Country: India
- State: West Bengal
- District: Purba Medinipur

Government
  - Type: Community development block

Area
  - Total: 155.52 km^{2} (60.05 sq mi)
- Elevation: 4 m (13 ft)

Population (2011)
  - Total: 157,793
  - Density: 1,014.6/km^{2} (2,627.8/sq mi)

Languages
  - Official: Bengali, English
- Time zone: UTC+5:30 (IST)
- PIN: 721449 (Marisda)
- Area code: 03224
- ISO 3166 code: IN-WB
- Vehicle registration: WB-29, WB-30, WB-31, WB-32, WB-33
- Literacy: 89.88%
- Lok Sabha constituency: Kanthi
- Vidhan Sabha constituency: Kanthi Dakshin, Kanthi Uttar
- Website: purbamedinipur.gov.in

Contai III (also known as Kanthi III block) is a community development block that forms an administrative division in Contai subdivision of Purba Medinipur district in the Indian state of West Bengal.

== Geography ==
Purba Medinipur district is part of the lower Indo-Gangetic Plain and Eastern coastal plains. Topographically, the district can be divided into two parts – (a) almost entirely flat plains on the west, east and north, (b) the coastal plains on the south. The vast expanse of land is formed of alluvium and is composed of younger and coastal alluvial. The elevation of the district is within 10 metres above mean sea level. The district has a long coastline of 65.5 km along its southern and south eastern boundary. Five coastal CD Blocks, namely, Khejuri II, Contai II (Deshapran), Contai I, Ramnagar I and II, are occasionally affected by cyclones and tornadoes. Tidal floods are quite regular in these five CD Blocks. Normally floods occur in 21 of the 25 CD Blocks in the district. The major rivers are Haldi, Rupnarayan, Rasulpur, Bagui and Keleghai, flowing in north to south or south-east direction. River water is an important source of irrigation. The district has a low 899 hectare forest cover, which is 0.02% of its geographical area.

Durmuth, a constituent panchayat of Contai III block, is located at 21°49′25″N 87°43′43″E.

Contai III CD Block is bounded by Bhagabanpur II and Khejuri I CD Blocks in the north, Deshapran CD Block in the east, Contai I CD Block in the south and Egra II CD Block in the west.

It is located 59 km from Tamluk, the district headquarters.

Contai III CD Block has an area of 160.52 km^{2}. It has 1 panchayat samity, 8 gram panchayats, 117 gram sansads (village councils), 165 mouzas and 166 inhabited villages. Marishda police station serves this block. Headquarters of this CD Block is at Marishda.

Gram panchayats of Contai III block/ panchayat samiti are: Bhajachauli, Debendra, Durmuth, Kaniadighi, Kumirda, Kusumpur, Lauda and Marishda.

== Demographics ==
=== Population ===
As per 2011 Census of India Contai III CD Block had a total population of 157,793, all of which were rural. There were 81,143 (51%) males and 76,650 (49%) females. Population below 6 years was 17,985. Scheduled Castes numbered 20,832 (13.20%) and Scheduled Tribes numbered 144 (0.09%).

As per 2001 census, Contai III block had a total population of 137,364, out of which 70,418 were males and 66,946 were females. Contai III block registered a population growth of 12.52 per cent during the 1991-2001 decade. Decadal growth for the combined Midnapore district was 14.87 per cent. Decadal growth in West Bengal was 17.84 per cent.

Large villages (with 4,000+ population) in Contai III CD Block (2011 census figures in brackets): Marishda (5,953), Kanaidighi (8,783).

Other villages in Contai III CD Block (2011 census figures in brackets): Bhaja Chauli (2,541), Kumirda (3,625), Lauda (1,124), Dihibahiri (161).

=== Literacy ===
As per 2011 census the total number of literates in Contai III CD Block was 125,656 (89.88% of the population over 6 years) out of which 68,135 (54%) were males and 57,541 (46%) were females.

As per 2011 census, literacy in Purba Medinipur district was 87.02%. Purba Medinipur had the highest literacy amongst all the districts of West Bengal in 2011.

See also – List of West Bengal districts ranked by literacy rate

Literacy in CD blocks of
Purba Medinipur district
Tamluk subdivision
Tamluk – 87.06%
Sahid Matangini – 86.99%
Panskura I – 83.65%
Panskura II – 84.93%
Nandakumar – 85.56%
Chandipur – 87.81%
Moyna – 86.33%
Haldia subdivision
Mahishadal – 86.21%
Nandigram I – 84.89%
Nandigram II – 89.16%
Sutahata – 85.42%
Haldia – 85.96%
Contai subdivision
Contai I – 89.32%
Contai II – 88.33%
Contai III – 89.88%
Khejuri I – 88.90%
Khejuri II – 85.37%
Ramnagar I – 87.84%
Ramnagar II – 89.38%
Bhagabanpur II – 90.98%
Egra subdivision
Bhagabanpur I – 88.13%
Egra I – 82.83%
Egra II – 86.47%
Patashpur I – 86.58%
Patashpur II – 86.50%
2011 Census: CD Block Wise

Primary Census Abstract Data

=== Language and religion ===
Religion in Contai III CD block (2011)
Hinduism	96.35%
Islam	3.54%
Other or not stated	0.11%

In the 2011 census Hindus numbered 152,038 and formed 96.35% of the population in Contai III CD Block. Muslims numbered 5,584 and formed 3.54% of the population. Others numbered 171 and formed 0.11% of the population. In 2001, Hindus made up 96.39% and Muslims 3.54% of the population respectively.

Bengali is the predominant language, spoken by 98.55% of the population.

== Rural poverty ==
The District Human Development Report for Purba Medinipur has provided a CD Block-wise data table for Modified Human Poverty Index of the district. Contai III CD Block registered 29.68 on the MHPI scale. The CD Block-wise mean MHPI was estimated at 24.78. Eleven out of twentyfive CD Blocks were found to be severely deprived in respect of grand CD Block average value of MHPI (CD Blocks with lower amount of poverty are better): All the CD Blocks of Haldia and Contai subdivisions appeared backward, except Ramnagar I & II, of all the blocks of Egra subdivision only Bhagabanpur I appeared backward and in Tamluk subdivision none appeared backward.

== Economy ==
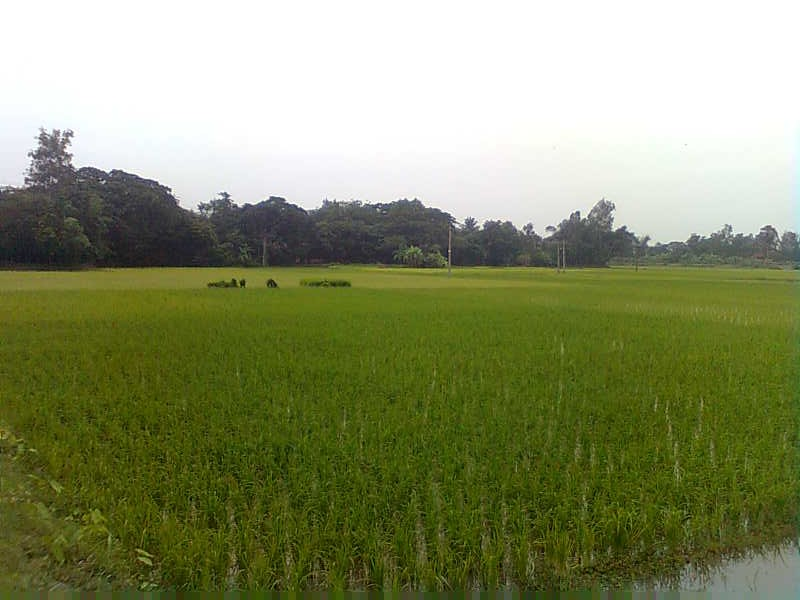
Paddy field at Daisai

=== Livelihood ===
In Contai III CD Block in 2011, total workers formed 41.29% of the total population and amongst the class of total workers, cultivators formed 19.18%, agricultural labourers 33.94%, household industry workers 7.18% and other workers 39.70.%.

=== Infrastructure ===
There are 166 inhabited villages in Contai III CD block. All 166 villages (100%) have power supply. 164 villages (98.8%) have drinking water supply. 27 villages (16.27%) have post offices. 155 villages (93.37%) have telephones (including landlines, public call offices and mobile phones). 25 villages (15.06%) have a pucca (paved) approach road and 31 villages (18.67%) have transport communication (includes bus service, rail facility and navigable waterways). 35 villages (31.08%) have agricultural credit societies. 13 villages (7.83%) have banks.

In 2007–08, around 40% of rural households in the district had electricity.

In 2013–14, there were 71 fertiliser depots, 12 seed stores and 32 fair price shops in the CD Block.

=== Agriculture ===
Persons engaged in agriculture
in Contai III CD Block
1. Bargadars (7.19%)
2. Patta holders (27.3%)
3. Small farmers (2.66%)
4. Marginal farmers (29.4%)
5. Agricultural labourers (33.4%)

According to the District Human Development Report of Purba Medinipur: The agricultural sector is the lifeline of a predominantly rural economy. It is largely dependent on the Low Capacity Deep Tubewells (around 50%) or High Capacity Deep Tubewells (around 27%) for irrigation, as the district does not have a good network of canals, compared to some of the neighbouring districts. In many cases the canals are drainage canals which get the backflow of river water at times of high tide or the rainy season. The average size of land holding in Purba Medinipur, in 2005–06, was 0.73 hectares against 1.01 hectares in West Bengal.

In 2013–14, the total area irrigated in Contai III CD Block was 4,953 hectares, out of which 2,543 hectares were irrigated by tank water, 1,710 hectares by deep tube well and 700 hectares by shallow tube well.

Although the Bargadari Act of 1950 recognised the rights of bargadars to a higher share of crops from the land that they tilled, it was not implemented fully. Large tracts, beyond the prescribed limit of land ceiling, remained with the rich landlords. From 1977 onwards major land reforms took place in West Bengal. Land in excess of land ceiling was acquired and distributed amongst the peasants. Following land reforms land ownership pattern has undergone transformation. In 2013–14, persons engaged in agriculture in Contai III CD Block could be classified as follows: bargadars 7.19%, patta (document) holders 27.28%, small farmers (possessing land between 1 and 2 hectares) 2.66%, marginal farmers (possessing land up to 1 hectare) 29.45% and agricultural labourers 33.42%.

In 2013–14, Contai III CD Block produced 18,098 tonnes of Aman paddy, the main winter crop, from 13,195 hectares, 6,413 tonnes of Boro paddy, the spring crop, from 2,095 hectares and 118 tonnes of potatoes from 164 hectares. It also produced oil seeds.

Betelvine is a major source of livelihood in Purba Medinipur district, particularly in Tamluk and Contai subdivisions. Betelvine production in 2008-09 was the highest amongst all the districts and was around a third of the total state production. In 2008–09, Purba Mednipur produced 2,789 tonnes of cashew nuts from 3,340 hectares of land.

Concentration of Handicraft Activities in CD Blocks
- Horn Craft - Kolaghat
- Pata Chitra - Chandipur, Nandakumar
- Sea Shell – Ramnagar I & II
- Mat & Mat Diversified Products – Ramnagar I, Egra I & II, Patashpur I
- Brass & Bell Metal – Ramnagar I, Mahisadal, Patashpur II, Egra I
- Diversified Jute Products – Ramnagar II, Nandakumar, Kolaghat, Shahid Matangini
- Cane & Bamboo Products - Chandipur, Nandakumar, Kolaghat, Shahid Matangini
- Sola Craft - Tamluk, Kolaghat
- Pottery/Terracotta - Panskura, Tamluk, Sahid Matangini, Nandakumar
- Wood Craft - Tamluk
- Zari work- Sutahta, Mahisadal, Haldia, Nandakumar

Source: District Human Development Report, Purba Medinipur, Page 97

=== Pisciculture ===
Purba Medinipur's net district domestic product derives one fifth of its earnings from fisheries, the highest amongst all the districts of West Bengal. The nett area available for effective pisciculture in Contai III CD Block in 2013-14 was 750.60 hectares. 2,755 persons were engaged in the profession and approximate annual production was 28,598 quintals.

=== Banking ===
In 2013–14, Contai III CD Block had offices of 4 commercial banks and 3 gramin banks.

=== Backward Regions Grant Fund ===
Medinipur East district is listed as a backward region and receives financial support from the Backward Regions Grant Fund. The fund, created by the Government of India, is designed to redress regional imbalances in development. As of 2012, 272 districts across the country were listed under this scheme. The list includes 11 districts of West Bengal.

== Transport ==
Contai III CD Block has 3 ferry services, 3 originating/ terminating bus routes.

== Education ==
In 2013–14, Contai III CD Block had 132 primary schools with 5,934 students, 14 middle schools with 828 students, 8 high schools with 6,216 students and 11 higher secondary schools with 12,443 students. Contai III CD Block had 1 general college with 538 students and 290 institutions for special and non-formal education with 12,305 students.

As per the 2011 census, in Contai III CD block, amongst the 166 inhabited villages, 21/22 villages did not have a school, 49 villages had two or more primary schools, 35 villages had at least 1 primary and 1 middle school and 23 villages had at least 1 middle and 1 secondary school.

== Healthcare ==
In 2014, Contai III CD Block had 1 block primary health centre and 2 primary health centres with total 10 beds and 5 doctors (excluding private bodies). It had 24 family welfare sub centres. 515 patients were treated indoor and 126,451 patients were treated outdoor in the hospitals, health centres and subcentres of the CD Block.

Kharipukuria Block Primary Health Centre at Kharipukuria, PO Nachinda Bazar (with 10 beds) is the main medical facility in Contai III CD block. There are primary health centres at Banamalichatta (with 10 beds), Bhaitgarh (with ? beds) and Deulbarh (with 2 beds).
