= Mecheda railway station =

Railway station in West Bengal, India

Mecheda
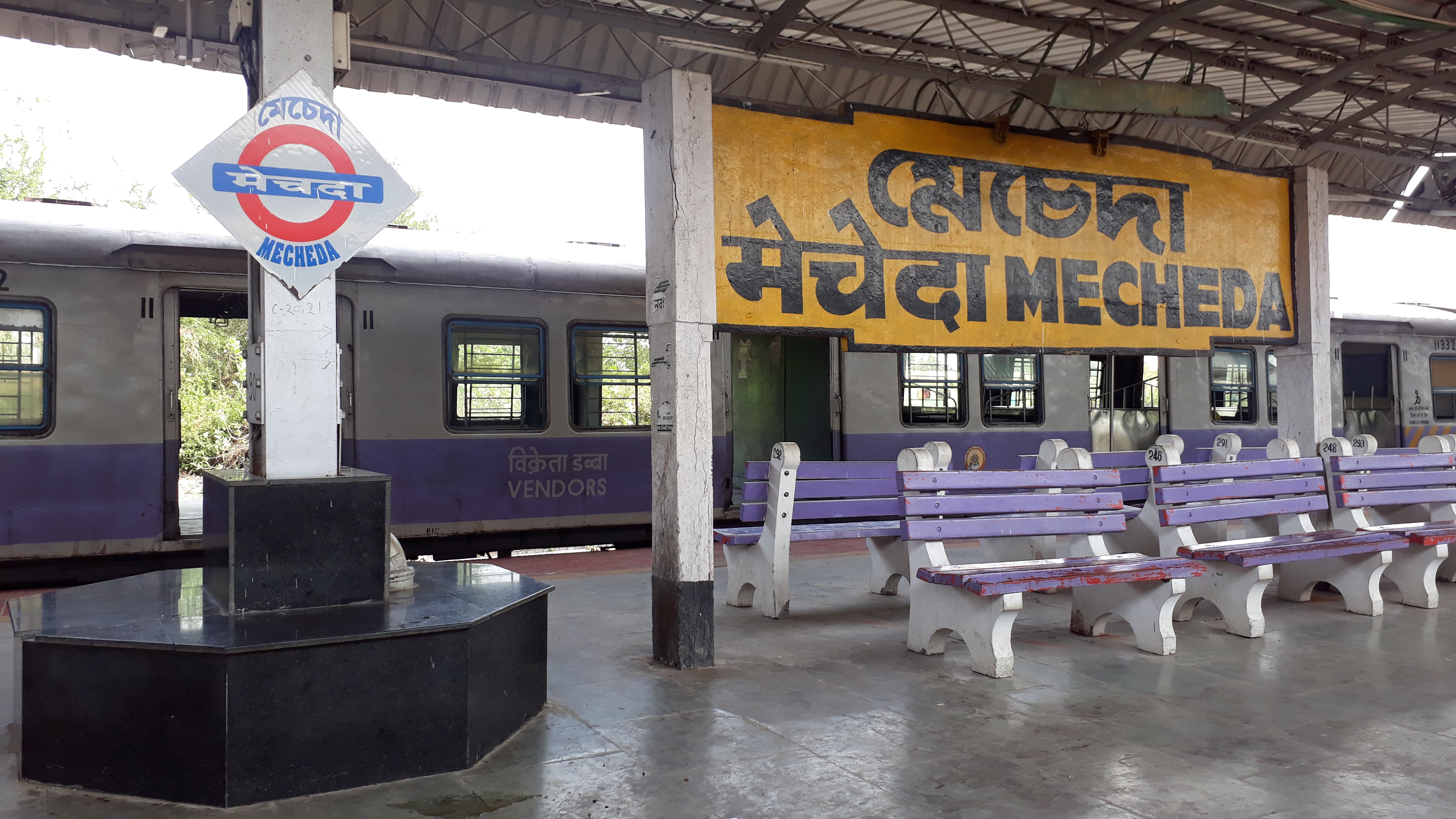
- Mecheda railway station

General information
- Location: Mecheda, Purba Medinipur district, West Bengal; India
- Coordinates: 22°24′49″N 87°51′23″E
- Elevation: 10 metres (33 ft)
- System: Kolkata Suburban Railway station
- Owner: Indian Railways
- Line: Howrah–Kharagpur line
- Platforms: 6

Construction
- Structure type: At grade
- Parking: yes
- Cycle facilities: yes

Other information
- Station code: MCA
- Zone(s): Eastern Railway
- Division(s): Kharagpur
- Fare zone: South Eastern Railway

History
- Opened: 1900
- Electrified: 1967–69

Services
Preceding station	Kolkata Suburban Railway	Following station
Nandaigajan towards Midnapore	South Eastern Line Howrah–Kharagpur line	Kolaghat towards Howrah Junction
Route map
Location
- Location within West Bengal

Mecheda railway station in the Indian state of West Bengal, serves Mecheda, India in Purba Medinipur district. It is on the Howrah–Kharagpur line. It is 58 km (36 mi) from Howrah Station.

== History ==
It serves Mecheda town. It is a major railway station between Howrah and Kharagpur. Special EMU trains are available here, and local EMU trains Howrah–Panskura, Howrah–Balichak, Howrah–Kharagpur, Howrah–Medinipur, Howrah–Haldia stop here. The Howrah–Kharagpur line was opened in 1900. The Howrah–Panskura stretch has three lines. The Howrah–Kharagpur line was electrified in 1967–69.
