= Patashpur I =

- Community development block
- Coordinates: 22.0591°N 87.6371°E
- Country: India
- State: West Bengal
- District: Purba Medinipur

Government
  - Type: Community development block

Area
  - Total: 172.26 km^{2} (66.51 sq mi)
- Elevation: 15 m (49 ft)

Population (2011)
  - Total: 173,337
  - Density: 1,006.3/km^{2} (2,606.2/sq mi)

Languages
  - Official: Bengali, English
- Time zone: UTC+5:30 (IST)
- PIN: 721454 (Amarshi)
- Area code: 03229
- ISO 3166 code: IN-WB
- Vehicle registration: WB-29, WB-30, WB-31, WB-32, WB-33
- Literacy: 86.58%
- Lok Sabha constituency: Kanthi
- Vidhan Sabha constituency: Patashpur
- Website: purbamedinipur.gov.in

Patashpur I (also spelled as Potashpur) is a community development block that forms an administrative division in Egra subdivision of Purba Medinipur district in the Indian state of West Bengal.

== Geography ==
Purba Medinipur district is part of the lower Indo-Gangetic Plain and Eastern coastal plains. Topographically, the district can be divided into two parts – (a) almost entirely flat plains on the west, east, and north, (b) the coastal plains on the south. The vast expanse of land is formed of alluvium and is composed of younger and coastal alluvial. The elevation of the district is within 10 metres above mean sea level. The district has a long coastline of 65.5 km along its southern and south eastern boundary. Five coastal CD Blocks, namely, Khejuri II, Contai II (Deshapran), Contai I, Ramnagar I and II, are occasionally affected by cyclones and tornadoes. Tidal floods are quite regular in these five CD Blocks. Normally floods occur in 21 of the 25 CD Blocks in the district. The major rivers are Haldi, Rupnarayan, Rasulpur, Bagui and Keleghai, flowing in north to south or south-east direction. River water is an important source of irrigation. The district has a low 899 hectare forest cover, which is 0.02% of its geographical area.

Barhat, a constituent panchayat of Patashpur I block, is located at 22°03′33″N 87°38′14″E.

Patashpur I CD Block is bounded by Sabang CD Block, in Paschim Medinipur district in the north, Bhagabanpur I and Bhagabanpur II CD Blocks in the east, Patashpur II CD Block in the south and Narayangarh and Dantan II CD Blocks, in Paschim Medinipur district, in the west.

It is located 54 km from Tamluk, the district headquarters.

Patashpur I CD Block has an area of 172.26 km^{2}. It has 1 panchayat samity, 9 gram panchayats, 127 gram sansads (village councils), 140 mouzas and 136 inhabited villages. Patashpur police station serves this block. Headquarters of this CD Block is at Amarshi Kasba.

Gram panchayats of Patashpur I block/ panchayat samiti are: Amarshi I, Amarshi II, Barhat, Brajalalpur, Chistipur I, Chistipur II, Gokulpur, Gopalpur and Naipur.

== Demographics ==
=== Population ===
As per 2011 Census of India Potashpur I CD Block had a total population of 173,377, of which 166,977 were rural dwellers while 6,400 were urban. There were 89,555 (52%) males and 83,822 (48%) females. Population below 6 years was 19,008. Scheduled Castes numbered 24,341 (14.04%) and Scheduled Tribes numbered 1,124 (0.65%).

As per 2001 census, Patashpur I block had a total population of 151,605, out of which 77,640 were males and 73,965 were females. Patashpur I block registered a population growth of 13.28 per cent during the 1991-2001 decade. Decadal growth for the combined Midnapore district was 14.87 per cent. Decadal growth in West Bengal was 17.84 per cent.

Census Town in Patashpur I CD Block (2011 census figure in brackets): Amarshi Kasba (6,400).

Large villages (with 4,000+ population) in Patashpur I CD Block (2011 census figures in brackets): Amarpur (4,388), Gokulpur (5,967), Selmabad (5,266), Gopalpur (4,405) and Taladiha (4,599).

Other villages in Patashpur I CD Block (2011 census figures in brackets) : Naipur (3,800), Brajalalpur (1,144), Chistipur (3,019), Barhat (2,781) and Golara Nij (3,001).

=== Literacy ===
As per 2011 census the total number of literates in Patashpur I CD Block was 132,781 (86.58% of the population over 6 years) out of which 73,302 (55%) were males and 59,479 (45%) were females.

As per 2011 census, literacy in Purba Medinipur district was 87.02%. Purba Medinipur had the highest literacy amongst all the districts of West Bengal in 2011.

See also – List of West Bengal districts ranked by literacy rate

Literacy in CD blocks of
Purba Medinipur district
Tamluk subdivision
Tamluk – 87.06%
Sahid Matangini – 86.99%
Panskura I – 83.65%
Panskura II – 84.93%
Nandakumar – 85.56%
Chandipur – 87.81%
Moyna – 86.33%
Haldia subdivision
Mahishadal – 86.21%
Nandigram I – 84.89%
Nandigram II – 89.16%
Sutahata – 85.42%
Haldia – 85.96%
Contai subdivision
Contai I – 89.32%
Contai II – 88.33%
Contai III – 89.88%
Khejuri I – 88.90%
Khejuri II – 85.37%
Ramnagar I – 87.84%
Ramnagar II – 89.38%
Bhagabanpur II – 90.98%
Egra subdivision
Bhagabanpur I – 88.13%
Egra I – 82.83%
Egra II – 86.47%
Patashpur I – 86.58%
Patashpur II – 86.50%
2011 Census: CD Block Wise

Primary Census Abstract Data

=== Language and religion ===
Religion in Patashpur I CD block (2011)
Hinduism	93.23%
Islam	6.66%
Other or not stated	0.11%

In 2011 census Hindus numbered 161,639 and formed 93.23% of the population in Patashpur I CD Block. Muslims numbered 11,548 and formed 6.66% of the population. Others numbered 190 and formed 0.11% of the population. In 2001, Hindus made up 94.22% and Muslims 5.74% of the population respectively.

Languages of Patashpur I CD block (2011)
1. Bengali (98.3%)
2. Hindi (1.33%)
3. Others (0.38%)

According to the 2011 census, 98.29% of the population spoke Bengali and 1.33% Hindi as their first language.

== Rural poverty ==
The District Human Development Report for Purba Medinipur has provided a CD Block-wise data table for Modified Human Poverty Index of the district. Patashpur I CD Block registered 20.81 on the MHPI scale. The CD Block-wise mean MHPI was estimated at 24.78. Eleven out of twentyfive CD Blocks were found to be severely deprived in respect of grand CD Block average value of MHPI (CD Blocks with lower amount of poverty are better): All the CD Blocks of Haldia and Contai subdivisions appeared backward, except Ramnagar I & II, of all the blocks of Egra subdivision only Bhagabanpur I appeared backward and in Tamluk subdivision none appeared backward.

== Economy ==
=== Livelihood ===
In Patashpur I CD Block in 2011, total workers formed 42.22% of the total population and amongst the class of total workers, cultivators formed 32.75%, agricultural labourers 43.45%, household industry workers 7.39% and other workers 16.42%.

=== Infrastructure ===
There are 136 inhabited villages in Patashpur I CD block. All 136 villages (100%) have power supply. 135 villages (99.26%) have drinking water supply. 27 villages (19.85%) have post offices. 127 villages (93.38%) have telephones (including landlines, public call offices and mobile phones). 31 villages (22.79%) have a pucca (paved) approach road and 44 villages (32.35%) have transport communication (includes bus service, rail facility and navigable waterways). 39 villages (28.68%) have agricultural credit societies. 6 villages (4.41%) have banks.

In 2007-08, around 40% of rural households in the district had electricity.

In 2013-14, there were 69 fertiliser depots, 4 seed stores and 27 fair price shops in the CD Block.

=== Agriculture ===
Persons engaged in agriculture
in Patashpur I CD Block
1. Bargadars (6.98%)
2. Patta holders (11.6%)
3. Small farmers (1.90%)
4. Marginal farmers (33.7%)
5. Agricultural labourers (45.9%)

According to the District Human Development Report of Purba Medinipur: The agricultural sector is the lifeline of a predominantly rural economy. It is largely dependent on the Low Capacity Deep Tubewells (around 50%) or High Capacity Deep Tubewells (around 27%) for irrigation, as the district does not have a good network of canals, compared to some of the neighbouring districts. In many cases the canals are drainage canals which get the backflow of river water at times of high tide or the rainy season. The average size of land holding in Purba Medinipur, in 2005-06, was 0.73 hectares against 1.01 hectares in West Bengal.

In 2013-14, the total area irrigated in Patashpur I CD Block was 10,630 hectares, out of which 598 hectares were irrigated by canal water, 686 hectares by tank water, 4,215 hectares by deep tube well, 4,736 hectares by shallow tube well and 395 hectares by river lift irrigation.

Although the Bargadari Act of 1950 recognised the rights of bargadars to a higher share of crops from the land that they tilled, it was not implemented fully. Large tracts, beyond the prescribed limit of land ceiling, remained with the rich landlords. From 1977 onwards major land reforms took place in West Bengal. Land in excess of land ceiling was acquired and distributed amongst the peasants. Following land reforms land ownership pattern has undergone transformation. In 2013-14, persons engaged in agriculture in Patashpur I CD Block could be classified as follows: bargadars 6.98%, patta (document) holders 11.56%, small farmers (possessing land between 1 and 2 hectares) 1.90%, marginal farmers (possessing land up to 1 hectare) 33.71% and agricultural labourers 45.86%.

In 2013-14, Patashpur I CD Block produced 31,032 tonnes of Aman paddy, the main winter crop, from 17,281 hectares, 47,540 tonnes of Boro paddy, the spring crop, from 10,565 hectares, 11,875 tonnes of Aus paddy, the summer cop, from 4,682 hectares and 3,424 toones of potatoes, from 114 hectares. It also produced pulses and oilseeds.

Betelvine is a major source of livelihood in Purba Medinipur district, particularly in Tamluk and Contai subdivisions. Betelvine production in 2008-09 was the highest amongst all the districts and was around a third of the total state production. In 2008-09, Purba Mednipur produced 2,789 tonnes of cashew nuts from 3,340 hectares of land.

Concentration of Handicraft Activities in CD Blocks
- Horn Craft - Kolaghat
- Pata Chitra - Chandipur, Nandakumar
- Sea Shell – Ramnagar I & II
- Mat & Mat Diversified Products – Ramnagar I, Egra I & II, Patashpur I
- Brass & Bell Metal – Ramnagar I, Mahisadal, Patashpur II, Egra I
- Diversified Jute Products – Ramnagar II, Nandakumar, Kolaghat, Shahid Matangini
- Cane & Bamboo Products - Chandipur, Nandakumar, Kolaghat, Shahid Matangini
- Sola Craft - Tamluk, Kolaghat
- Pottery/Terracotta - Panskura, Tamluk, Sahid Matangini, Nandakumar
- Wood Craft - Tamluk
- Zari work- Sutahta, Mahisadal, Haldia, Nandakumar

Source: District Human Development Report, Purba Medinipur, Page 97

=== Pisciculture ===
Purba Medinipur's net district domestic product derives one fifth of its earnings from fisheries, the highest amongst all the districts of West Bengal. The nett area available for effective pisciculture in Patashpur I CD Block in 2013-14 was 1,845.53 hectares. 8,530 persons were engaged in the profession and approximate annual production was 70,315 quintals.

=== Banking ===
In 2013-14, Patashpur I CD Block had offices of 6 commercial banks like SBI Bank, PNB bank are very popular here and 1 gramin bank.

=== Backward Regions Grant Fund ===
Medinipur East district is listed as a backward region and receives financial support from the Backward Regions Grant Fund. The fund, created by the Government of India, is designed to redress regional imbalances in development. As of 2012, 272 districts across the country were listed under this scheme. The list includes 11 districts of West Bengal.

== Transport ==
Patashpur I CD Block has 8 ferry service and 14 originating/ terminating bus routes. The nearest railway station is Balichak Rail Station 39 km from Patashpur Town the block headquarters.

== Education ==
In 2013-14, Patashpur I CD Block had 124 primary schools with 7,368 students, 9 middle schools with 2,317 students, 11 high schools with 6,043 students and 11 higher secondary schools with 13,531 students. Patashpur I CD Block had 1 general college with 2,279 students, 1 technical/ professional institution with 100 students and 309 institutions for special and non-formal education with 12,107 students.

As per the 2011 census, in Patashpur I CD block, amongst the 136 inhabited villages, 10 villages did not have a school, 31 villages had two or more primary schools, 32 villages had at least 1 primary and 1 middle school and 17 villages had at least 1 middle and 1 secondary school.

Yogoda Satsanga Palpara Mahavidyalaya was established in 1964 at Palpara. It offers undergraduate, as well as B.Ed. and M.Ed. courses,

== Healthcare ==
In 2014, Patashpur I CD Block had 1 block primary health centre, 1 primary health centre and 3 nursing homes with total 40 beds and 4 doctors (excluding private bodies). It had 27 family welfare sub centres. 1,296 patients were treated indoor and 48,668 patients were treated outdoor in the hospitals, health centres and subcentres of the CD Block.

Gonara Block Primary Health Centre at Golara Nij, PO Manglamaro (with 10 beds) is the main medical facility in Patashpur I CD block. There is a primary health centre at Borhat, PO Katranka (with 6 beds).
