= Jukhia =

- Village
- Location in West Bengal, India Jukhia (India)
- Coordinates: 21.982713°N 87.764136°E
- Country: India
- State: West Bengal
- District: Purba Medinipur

Population (2011)
  - Total: 4,291

Languages
  - Official: Bengali, English
- Time zone: UTC+5:30 (IST)
- PIN: 721430
- Telephone/STD code: 03228
- Lok Sabha constituency: Kanthi
- Vidhan Sabha constituency: Bhagabanpur
- Website: purbamedinipur.gov.in

Jukhia is a village and a gram panchayat in the Bhagabanpur II CD block in the Contai subdivision of the Purba Medinipur district in the state of West Bengal, India.

== Geography ==
Cities and towns in Contai subdivision of Purba Medinipur district
M: municipal city/ town, CT: census town, R: rural/ urban centre, H: historical/ religious centre, S: port, sea-beach
Owing to space constraints in the small map, the actual locations in a larger map may vary slightly

=== Location ===
Jukhia is located at 21.982713°N 87.764136°E.

=== Urbanisation ===
93.55% of the population of Contai subdivision live in the rural areas. Only 6.45% of the population live in the urban areas and it is considerably behind Haldia subdivision in urbanization, where 20.81% of the population live in urban areas.

Note: The map alongside presents some of the notable locations in the subdivision. All places marked in the map are linked in the larger full screen map.

== Demographics ==
According to the 2011 Census of India, Jukhia had a total population of 4,291, of which 2,226 (52%) were males and 2,065 (48%) were females. There were 462 persons in the age range of 0–6 years. The total number of literate persons in Jukhia was 3,524 (92.03% of the population over 6 years).

== Education ==
The nearest college, Mugberia Gangadhar Mahavidyalaya at Mugberia, near Bhupatinagar was established in 1964. In addition to the courses in arts, science and commerce, it offers degree and post-graduate courses in physical education.

== Culture ==
David J. McCutchion mentions the Radha-Govinda temple as a West Bengal navaratna temple with turrets having curved ridging, measuring 31’ 6" square, and having been built in 1891–1901, rebuilt reincorporating terracotta carvings. The place is mentioned as Dheloa, possibly a neighbouring village with a similar name.

== Jukhia picture gallery ==
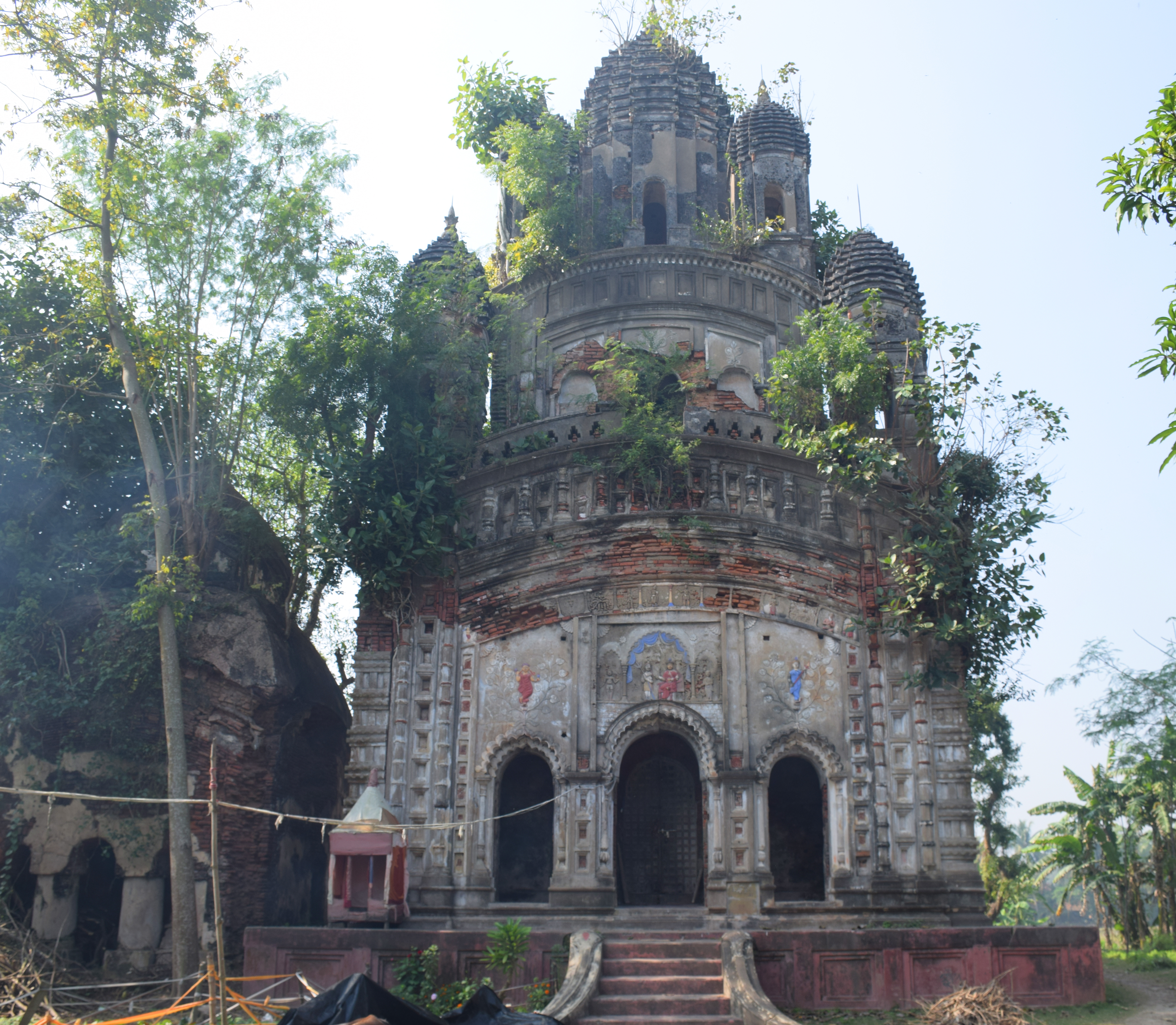
Radha Govinda temple

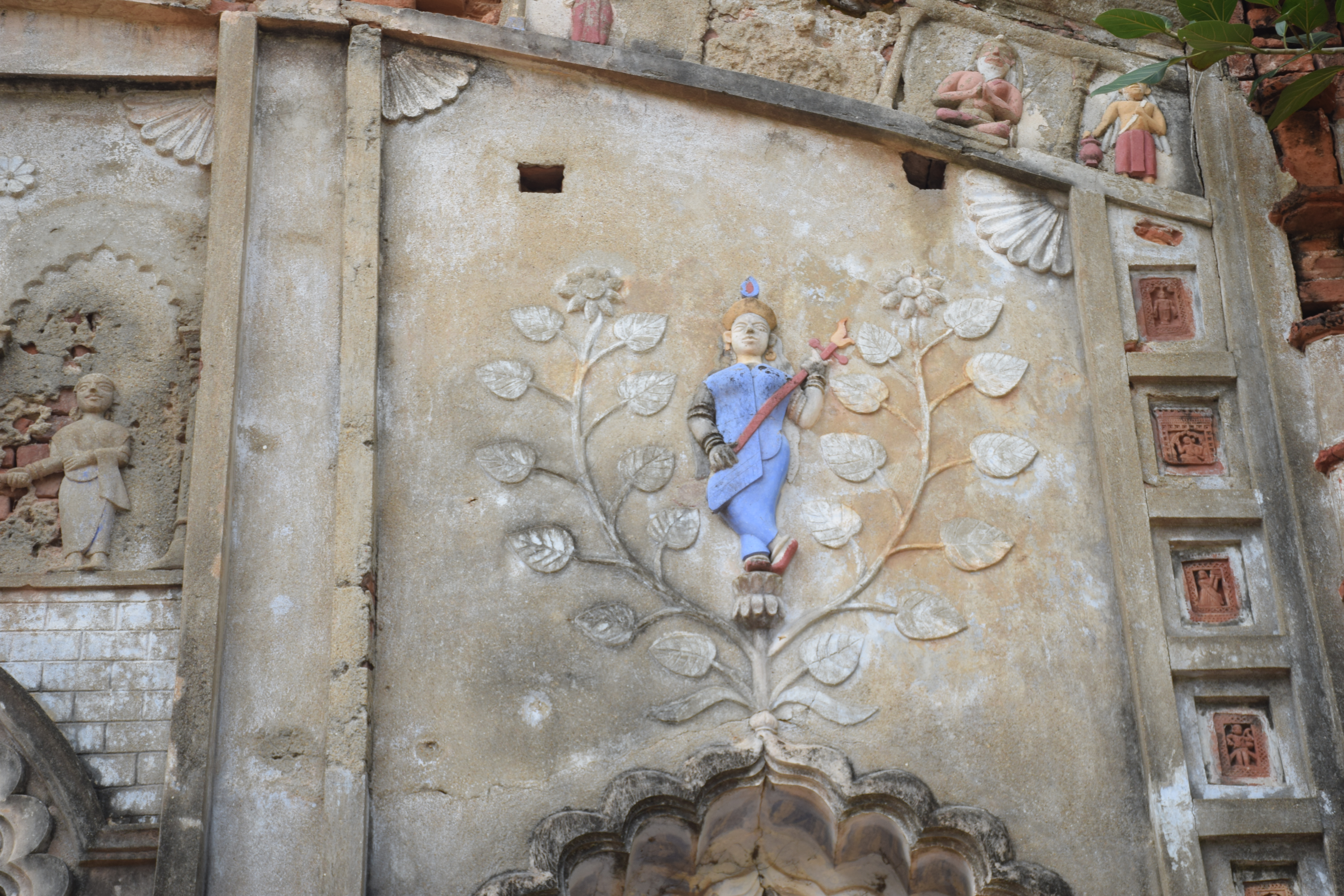
Decorations in Radha Govinda temple

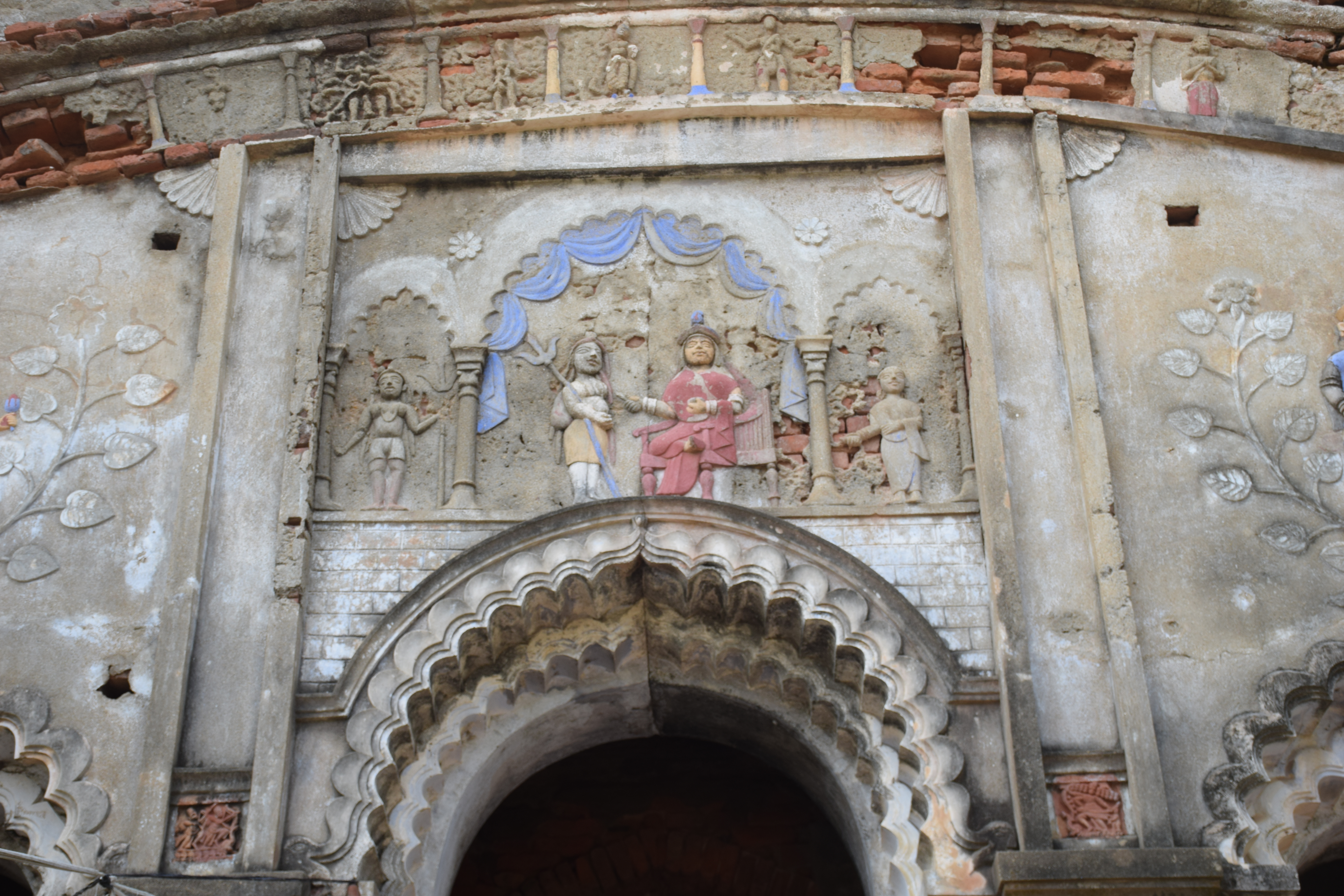
Decorations in Radha Govinda temple

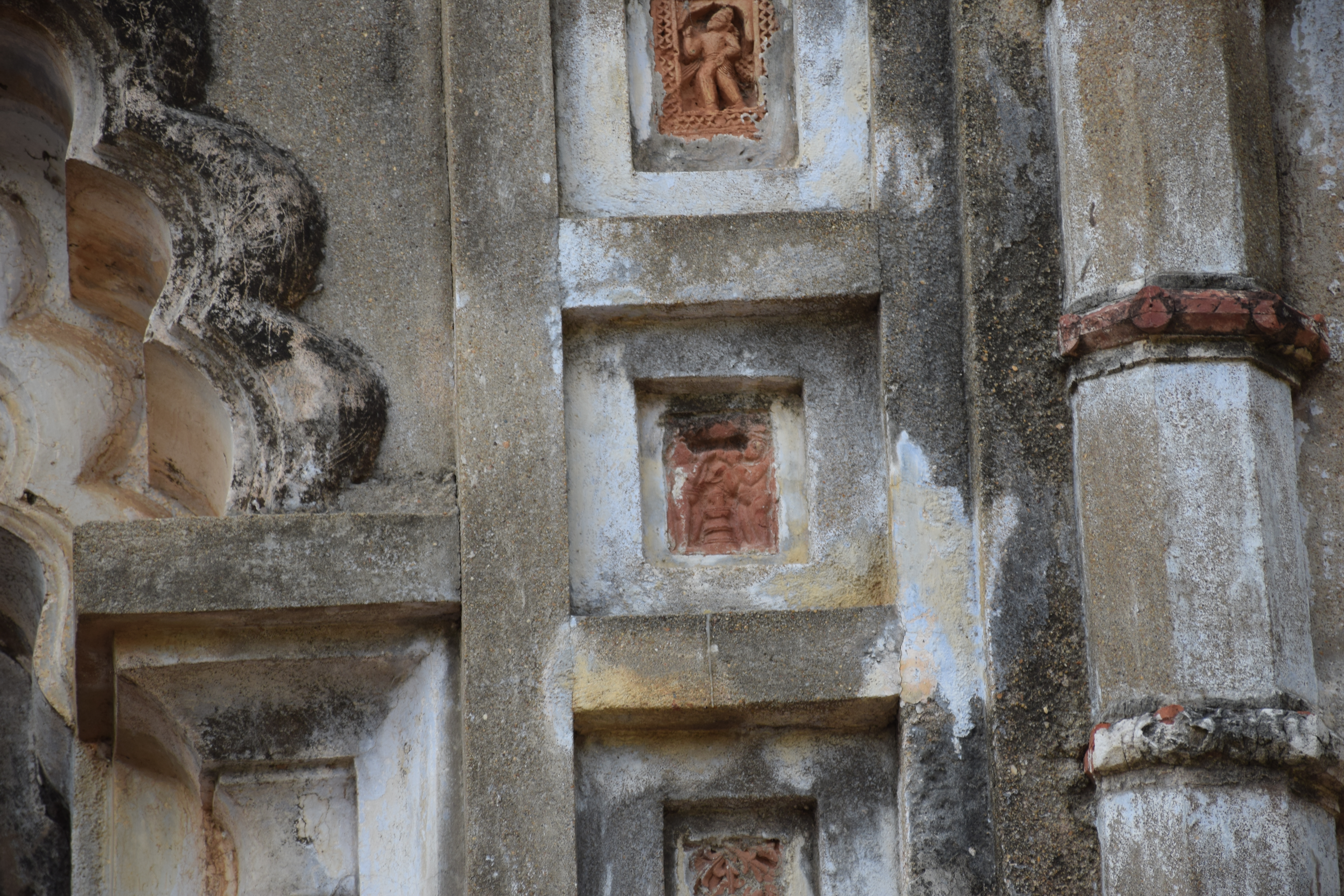
Decorations in Radha Govinda temple

== Healthcare ==
Bhupatinagar Mugberia Rural Hospital at Bhupatinagar (with 30 beds) is the major government medical facility in Bhagabanpur II CD block.
