= Panchetgarh =

- Village
- Location in West Bengal, India Panchetgarh (India)
- Coordinates: 21°57′20″N 87°33′37″E
- Country: India
- State: West Bengal
- District: Purba Medinipur

Government
  - Body: Gram panchayat

Languages
  - Official: Bengali, English
- Time zone: UTC+5:30 (IST)
- ISO 3166 code: IN-WB
- Vehicle registration: WB
- Website: wb.gov.in

Panchetgarh (also known as Panchet) is a village in Patashpur II CD Block in Egra subdivision in Purba Medinipur district of state of West Bengal in India.

== Demographics ==
As per 2011 Census of India Panchet had a total population of 4,106 of which 2,120 (52%) were males and 1,986 (48%) were females. Population below 6 years was 454. The total number of literates in Panchet was 3,010 (82.42% of the population over 6 years).
