= Dalimbachak =

Dalimbachak is a village under Chakdwipa, Anchal in Haldia Panchayet Samiti, India.
