= Daisai =

Village in West Bengal, India

- Small town
- Location in West Bengal, India Daisai (India)
- Coordinates: 21°50′05.6″N 87°44′40.2″E
- Country: India
- State: West Bengal
- District: Purba Medinipur

Population (2011)
  - Total: 3,170

Languages
  - Official: Bengali, English
- Time zone: UTC+5:30 (IST)
- PIN: 721 449
- Telephone/STD code: 91-3220
- Vehicle registration: WB-33-xxxx, WB-34-xxxx
- Lok Sabha constituency: Kanthi
- Vidhan Sabha constituency: Kanthi Dakshin
- Website: purbamedinipur.gov.in

Daisai is a small town in Contai III CD Block in Contai subdivision in the district of East Medinipur, in the state of West Bengal, India.

== Etymology ==
The previous name of Daisai was Dadhi Patna, which was then under the Bahiri Mutha Pargana. The legend has it that due to the scarcity of water and widespread salinity in ground water during that period, every family had to have their own water pond in which rainwater from the rainy season would be stored for the year long consumption. When a newly wed son of a villager wished to start a family with his bride in a separate household than that of his father, the old man being willing to gift him a pond hired a few hired hands as diggers. After a few days of digging, the hired hands unearthed an object that seemed like the part of a huge wooden structure. They could not immediately recognize the structure as the most it was still hidden in the soil, mud and earth. Persevering day after day they finally uncovered not only the said structure but a hidden treasure: gold and silver coins, idols and precious gems along with it. In the full view the wooden structure was recognized as the deck beam of a ship which had been probably sunk a long time ago, when the area had been submerged under the sea water of the Bay of Bengal. In the native language of the villagers (which is different from both Bengali and Oriya, yet is influenced by both the languages) the deck beam had been called 'Sai'. After this incident the village was called by its new name - Daisai - 'Dai' being the easier and aberrated form of the Sanskrit name Dadhi and 'Sai' being the deck beam of the sunken ship.

== Demographics ==
As per 2011 Census of India Daisai had a total population of 3,170 of which 1,624 (51%) were males and 1,546 (49%) were females. Population below 6 years was 334. The total number of literates in Daisai was 2,338 (82.44% of the population over 6 years).

== Economy ==
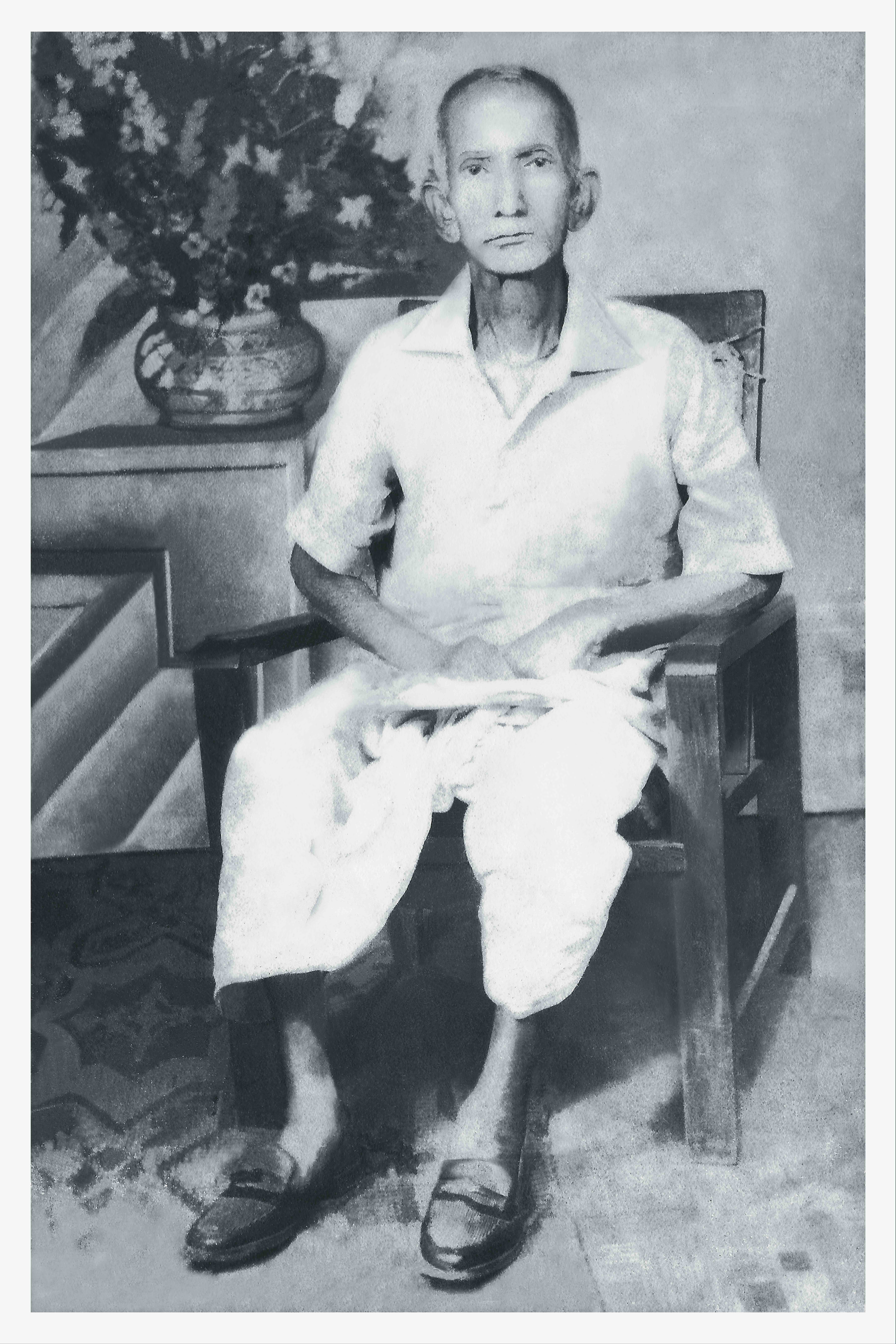
Portrait of Kalipada Paria, co-founder and first secretary of Daisai Krishi Unnyan Samiti Ltd.

Till the year 2000, small scale industry as Iron made home utensils were manufactured that gave employment to many villagers. After the year 2000, these industries were sick and shut down causing unemployment. Since income from agricultural land was not sufficient for dwelling, many villagers migrated to different parts of India as an unskilled labor for their livelihood.

An Agricultural Credit Society (Daisai Krishi Unnyan Samiti Ltd.) was formed in 1952 by Kalipada Paria, and his two friends, Gobinda Prasad Mandal and Bhuthanath Ghorai. That society is the only source of loans to the villagers and it also performs banking activities.

== Education ==
List of schools in Daisai

1. Daisai Board Primary School
2. Daisai Dakshin Sishu Siksha Kendra
3. Marishda B.K.J Banipith (H.S)
4. Daisai A.G Church ITI

== Transport ==
NH 116B connecting Nandakumar, Purba Medinipur (junction with NH 41) and Chandaneswar, Balasore district in Orissa passes through Daisai.
