= Bargoda =

Village in Purba Medinipur, West Bengal, India

Coordinates: 22°14′13.1″N 87°49′9.7″E

Bargoda is a village in the Purba Medinipur district of West Bengal, India. It is located in the Nandakumar block.

== Demography ==
Bargoda is situated on the bank of Kansabati river. It is part of Nandakumar Police Station area. The village has three primary schools and one high school. The population of the village is approximately 4500.
