= Anantapur, Purba Medinipur =

Anantapur
- Census town
- Location in West Bengal, India Anantapur (India)
- Coordinates: 22.3251°N 87.8203°E
- Country: India
- State: West Bengal
- District: Purba Medinipur

Area
  - Total: 1.3557 km^{2} (0.5234 sq mi)

Population (2011)
  - Total: 5,532
  - Density: 4,081/km^{2} (10,570/sq mi)

Languages
  - Official: Bengali, English
- Time zone: UTC+5:30 (IST)
- PIN: 721653 (Chanserpur)
- Telephone/STD code: 03228
- Lok Sabha constituency: Tamluk
- Vidhan Sabha constituency: Moyna
- Website: purbamedinipur.gov.in

Anantapur is a census town and a gram panchayat, in Tamluk CD block in Tamluk subdivision of Purba Medinipur district in the state of West Bengal, India.

== Geography ==
Cities and towns in Tamluk subdivision of Purba Medinipur district
M: municipal city/ town, CT: census town, R: rural/ urban centre, H: historical/ religious centre
Owing to space constraints in the small map, the actual locations in a larger map may vary slightly

=== Location ===
Anantapur is located at 22.3251°N 87.8203°E.

=== Urbanisation ===
94.08% of the population of Tamluk subdivision live in the rural areas. Only 5.92% of the population live in the urban areas, and that is the second lowest proportion of urban population amongst the four subdivisions in Purba Medinipur district, just above Egra subdivision.

Note: The map alongside presents some of the notable locations in the subdivision. All places marked in the map are linked in the larger full screen map.

== Demographics ==
As per 2011 Census of India Anantapur had a total population of 5,532 of which 2,849 (52%) were males and 2,683 (48%) were females. Population below 6 years was 701. The total number of literates in Anantapur was 4,328 (89.59% of the population over 6 years).

== Infrastructure ==
As per the District Census Handbook 2011, Anantapur covered an area of 1.3557 km^{2}. It had the facility of a railway station at Raghunathbari 4 km away and bus route in the town. Amongst the civic amenities it had 613 domestic electric connections. Amongst the medical facilities it had 3 medicine shops in the town. Amongst the educational facilities it had were 5 primary schools, 3 middle schools, 1 secondary school and 1 senior secondary school in the town. The nearest degree college was at Tamluk 10 km away. Amongst the recreational and cultural facilities a cinema theatre was there at Radhamani 4 km away.

== Transport ==
Anantapur is on State Highway 4.

== Education ==
Ananatapur Bani Niketan Girls High School is a girls only higher secondary school affiliated to the West Bengal Council of Higher Secondary Education.

Chanserpur High School, PO Chanserpur, is a Bengali-medium boys only higher secondary school, established in 1914. It has arrangements for teaching from class VI to XII. It has a library and a play ground.

== Healthcare ==
Anantapur Rural Hospital at Anantapur, PO Chanserpur (with 30 beds) is the main medical facility in Tamluk CD block. There is a primary health centre at Kelomal Purbanakha, PO Putputia (with 10 beds).
