= Srigouri =

Srigouri is a small village at Haripur Gram Panchat under Nandigram Block-1, in Purba Medinipur district of West Bengal, India. As of 2009, the village had a population of 1,155.Here mainly two religious people (Hindu, Muslim) live together. 70% of people from the village are educated. The majority live on agriculture.
