= Namalbarh =

- Village
- Country: India
- State: West Bengal
- District: Purba Medinipur

Population (2011)
  - Total: 2,900

Languages
  - Official: Bengali, English
- Time zone: UTC+5:30 (IST)
- PIN: 721151
- ISO 3166 code: IN-WB
- Vehicle registration: WB
- Lok Sabha constituency: Tamluk
- Vidhan Sabha constituency: Panskura Purba
- Website: wb.gov.in

Namalbarh is a small village in Bhogpur (Purba Medinipur), Gram panchayat, in the Kolaghat block of the Tamluk sub-division in the district of Purba Medinipur in the West Bengal state. The nearest railway station is Bhogpur railway station.
