= Bhogpur, Purba Medinipur =

Bhogpur
- Village
- Location in West Bengal, India
- Coordinates: 22.405°N 87.818°E
- Country: India
- State: West Bengal
- District: Purba Medinipur
- Elevation: 9 m (30 ft)

Languages
  - Official: Bengali, English
- Time zone: UTC+5:30 (IST)
- PIN: 721151
- Telephone code: 03228

Bhogpur is a village and a Gram panchayat in the district of Purba Medinipur in the state of West Bengal. It is situated in Tamluk subdivision under Kolaghat block. Bhogpur railway station is located here. This is the main lifeline of this village, as well as other subsequent villages. Two more rail stations, Nandaigajan and Narayan Pakuria Murail, are under this gram panchayat. People of Nandaigajan, Naryan Pakuria use the nearest station, although Bhogpur railway station is used more than these two. Bhogpur market is the main market of this Gram panchayat. The village under this Gram panchayat is Bhogpur itself and Kishorchak, Namalbarh, Kodalia, Nandaigajan, and Naryan Pakuria. Three banks provide service here, two of them are nationalized and one is the Gramin bank. The Gramin Bank is Bangiya Gramin Vikash Bank and two nationalized banks are Union Bank of India and United Bank of India. There is also a post office named Bhogpur S.O.(721151).

== Education ==
Bhogpur K. M. High School is located in Bhogpur, near Bhogpur railway station which was established by the local people with help from Pannalal Sasmal. Another high school is Kishorchak Banamali High School, situated in the village of Kishorchak, established by Banamali Charan Khatua, a local man from the village of Namalbarh under this Gram panchayat. He was also the founder of Panskura Banamali College in Panskura 9 km away from here. A few primary schools are situated in this village, as well as in adjacent villages. Though two secondary and higher secondary schools are Gram panchayat government-aided, but not all primary schools are. There are few non-government primary schools located here.
