= Jabda =

- village
- Location in West Bengal
- Coordinates: 21°58′11″N 87°39′34″E
- Country: India
- State: West Bengal
- District: Purba Medinipur
- Time zone: UTC+5:30 (IST)

Jabda is a small village in the Purba Medinipur district in the Indian state of West Bengal.

== Economy ==
Eighty percent of the population work in agriculture, primarily grain and paddy.

== Education ==
One high school and four primary schools serve the village.

== Festivals ==
The largest fair is Rash Mela, a ten-day event held in November. Cultural functions are held and singers, dancers and musicians come from all parts of the south-state to participate.

The Rash Yatra Festival is celebrated to remember the love story of Lord Krishna and his beloved Radha, including the glorious days that he spent in Brindyavan. It presents various stalls of delicacies of papad, Jilipi, Goja, Satpuri and many other Bengali dishes.
