= Golara Nij =

- Village
- Location in West Bengal, India Golara Nij (India)
- Coordinates: 22.0781°N 87.6461°E
- Country: India
- State: West Bengal
- District: Purba Medinipur

Population (2011)
  - Total: 3,001

Languages
  - Official: Bengali, English
- Time zone: UTC+5:30 (IST)
- PIN: 721434 (Manglamaro)
- Telephone/STD code: 03220
- Lok Sabha constituency: Kanthi
- Vidhan Sabha constituency: Patashpur
- Website: purbamedinipur.gov.in

Golara Nij is a village in Patashpur I CD block in Contai subdivision of Purba Medinipur district in the state of West Bengal, India.

== Geography ==
Cities and towns in Egra subdivision of Purba Medinipur district
M: municipal city/ town, CT: census town, R: rural/ urban centre, H: historical/ religious centre.
Owing to space constraints in the small map, the actual locations in a larger map may vary slightly

=== Location ===
Golara Nij is located at 22.0781°N 87.6461°E.

=== Urbanisation ===
96.96% of the population of Egra subdivision live in the rural areas. Only 3.04% of the population live in the urban areas, and that is the lowest proportion of urban population amongst the four subdivisions in Purba Medinipur district.

Note: The map alongside presents some of the notable locations in the subdivision. All places marked in the map are linked in the larger full screen map.

== Demographics ==
As per 2011 Census of India Golara Nij had a total population of 3,001 of which 1,542 (51%) were males and 1,459 (49%) were females. Population below 6 years was 278. The total number of literates in Golara Nij was 2,327 (85.46% of the population over 6 years).

== Transport ==
Golara Nij is on Egra-Bajkul Road.

== Education ==
The nearest degree college, Yogoda Satsanga Palpara Mahavidyalaya at Palpara, was established in 1964.

== Healthcare ==
Gonara Block Primary Health Centre at Golara Nij, PO Manglamaro (with 10 beds) is the main medical facility in Patashpur I CD block. There is a primary health centre at Borhat, PO Katranka (with 6 beds).
