= Chak Srikrishnapur =

- Village
- Location in West Bengal, India Chak Srikrishnapur (India)
- Coordinates: 22.2785°N 87.9031°E
- Country: India
- State: West Bengal
- District: Purba Medinipur

Population (2011)
  - Total: 2,001

Languages
  - Official: Bengali, English
- Time zone: UTC+5:30 (IST)
- PIN: 721649
- Lok Sabha constituency: Tamluk
- Vidhan Sabha constituency: Tamluk
- Website: purbamedinipur.gov.in

Chak Srikrishnapur is a village in Tamluk CD block in Tamluk subdivision of Purba Medinipur district in the state of West Bengal, India.

== Geography ==
Cities and towns in Tamluk subdivision of Purba Medinipur district
M: municipal city/ town, CT: census town, R: rural/ urban centre, H: historical/ religious centre
Owing to space constraints in the small map, the actual locations in a larger map may vary slightly

=== Location ===
Chak Srikrishnapur is located at 22.2785°N 87.9031°E.

=== Urbanisation ===
94.08% of the population of Tamluk subdivision live in the rural areas. Only 5.92% of the population live in the urban areas, and that is the second lowest proportion of urban population amongst the four subdivisions in Purba Medinipur district, just above Egra subdivision.

Note: The map alongside presents some of the notable locations in the subdivision. All places marked in the map are linked in the larger full screen map.

== Demographics ==
As per 2011 Census of India Chak Srikrishnapur had a total population of 2,100 of which 1,035 (49%) were males and 1,065 (51%) were females. Population below 6 years was 309. The total number of literates in Chak Srikrishnapur was 1,525 (85.15% of the population over 6 years).

== Transport ==
Chak Srikrishnapur is on the Tamluk-Srirampur Road.

== Education ==
Shahid Matangini Hazra Government College for Women was established in 2015 at Chaksrikrishnapur, PO Kulberia. Affiliated to the Vidyasagar University, it offers honours courses in Bengali, English, Sanskrit, political science, philosophy, physics, chemistry, mathematics, statistics, geology, geography and economics, and general courses in arts and science.
