= Shipur =

- Village
- Location within West Bengal Location within India
- Coordinates: 21.7749°N 87.4729°E
- Country: India
- State: West Bengal
- District: Purba Medinipur

Population (2011)
  - Total: 8,881

Languages
  - Official: Bengali, English
- Time zone: UTC+5:30 (IST)
- Postal code: 721448
- ISO 3166 code: IN-WB

Shipur is a fast growing village under Egra I community development block of Purba Medinipur district in the state of West Bengal, India. Famous for its annual Charak, this village has well-developed social facilities like schools, post office, market, co-operative society, telecommunication, ATM, playground, children's park etc. A health centre is also functioning in this village. As per Constitution of India and Panchayati Raj Act, Shipur village is administrated by Sarpanch (Gram Pradhan) who is the elected representative of village. Shipur is under the administration of Sahara Gram Panchayat.

== Geography ==
It is located at 21.7749°N 87.4729°E, 18 km from the northern side of the Bay of Bengal.

Though officially Shipur is a small single village, Greater Shipur is considered as a group of seven small villages or Mouzas including Shipur. itself along with Shunia., Sinduria., Satkania., Hatbar., Pandua. and Tahalia.

=== Demography ===
As per 2011 Census of India, total population of Greater Shipur is 8881. However, as per electoral roll database as on 30.04.2023, total number of verified electors in the seven mouzas is 7305. Details of the electors is tabulated below.

Name of Mouza	Number of Male Electors	Number of Female Electors
Shipur	472	466
Shunia	915	875
Sinduria	512	494
Satkania	483	430
Dakshin Shipur	503	510
Tahalia	441	410
Pandua and Hatbar	398	390
Total	3730	3575

The village has higher literacy rate compared to West Bengal. In 2011, literacy rate of Greater Shipur was 87.65% compared to 76.26% of West Bengal. In Greater Shipur Male literacy stood at 93.60% while female literacy rate was 81.45%.

Most of the people here are cultivators or related to agricultural work.

=== Climate ===
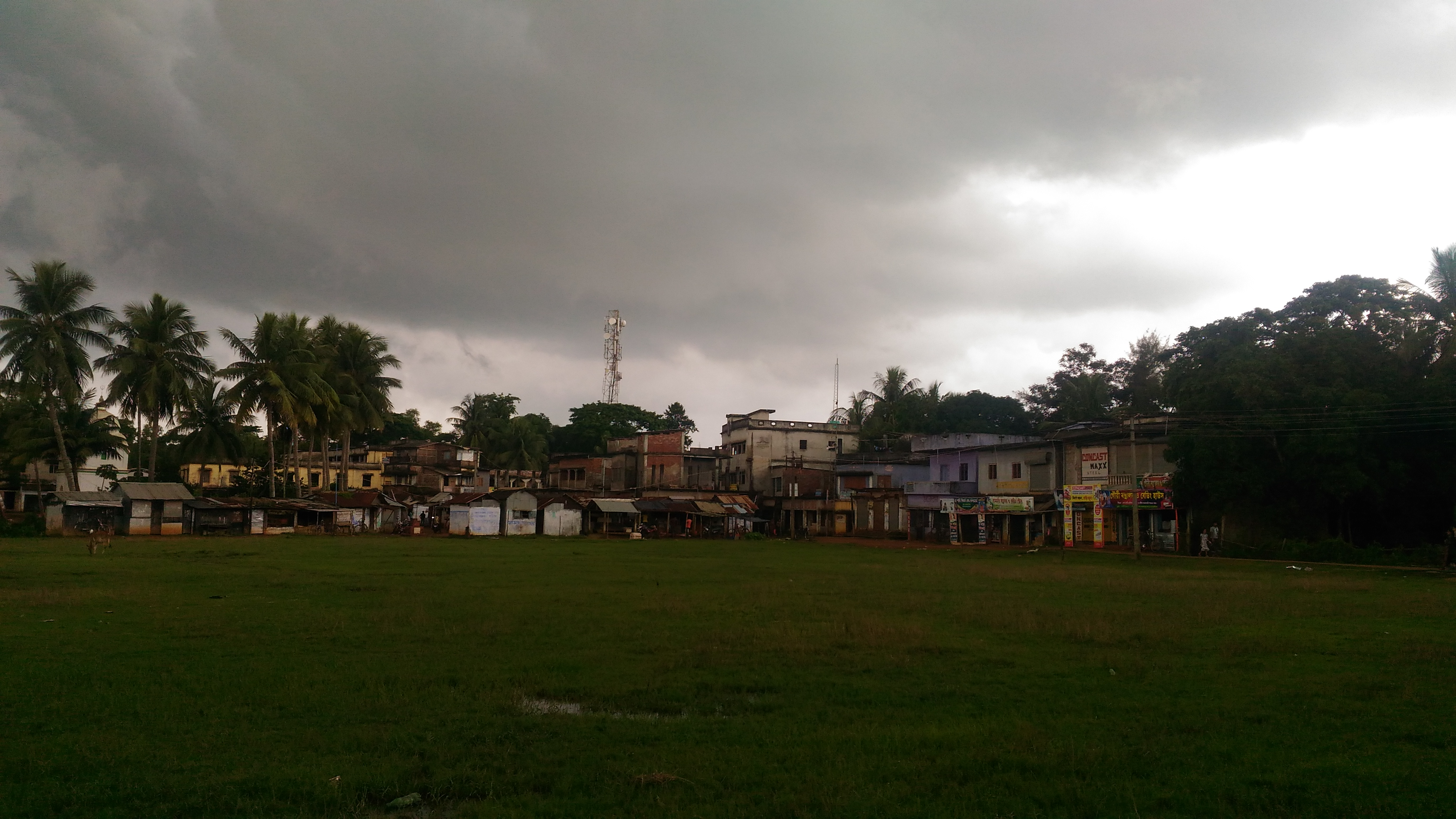
Monsoon cloud over playground

There are mainly three seasons in Shipur, namely Summer, Monsoon and Winter. Summer starts in April and continues till June with a maximum temperature of 38 °C. But due to proximity of sea, cold wind keeps the weather pleasant in this time. Next comes monsoon in July and lasts till the end of September. Shipur generally experiences an average rainfall with high humidity in the monsoon season. Winter sets in November and lasts till February with temperature ranging from 24-7 °C.

== Transport ==
Egra, a well-known municipal town situated at 19.1 kilometer north-east of Shipur, works as the main connector for it.

=== Bus service ===
There is bus service from Shipur to Kolkata/Howrah via Egra. It is almost a 5-hour journey to Kolkata. There is no direct bus service to the other parts of West Bengal and for this reason people come to Egra first to board a bus for other destinations. Although Digha, the famous beach-town, is only a few kilometers away (27.9 km via Egra - Ramnagar Road, 20.3 km via Mirgoda) it is not directly accessible by public transport. People usually take multiple public transports or arrange for their own mode of transport to go to Digha and other nearby places. Trekkers, Autos and Totos (E-Rickshaw) are some other popular mode of transportation.

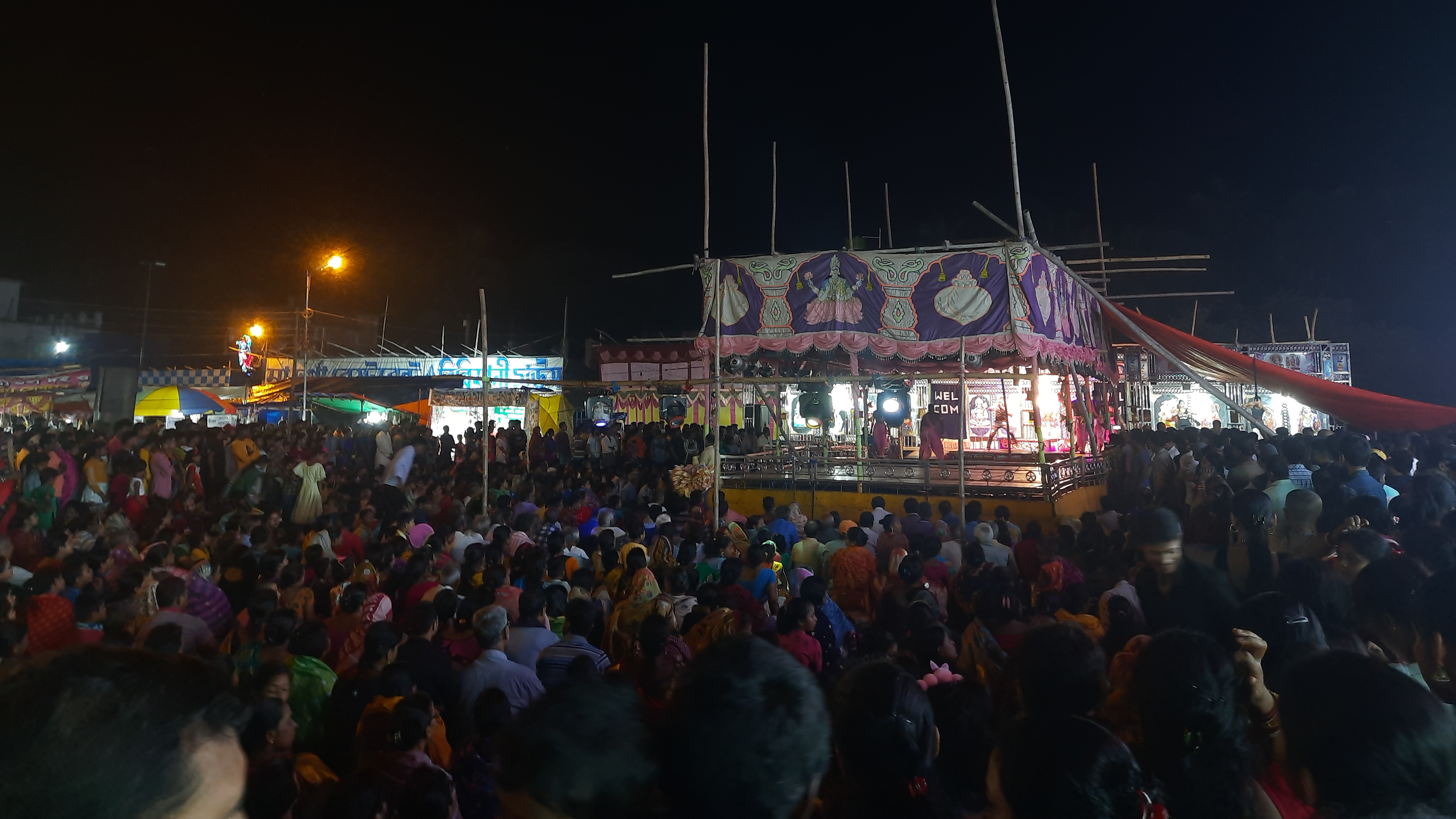
A glimpse of the Charak Festival of Shipur

=== Trains ===
There is no train route to Shipur. Nearest railway station is Ramnagar

=== Nearby places of interest ===
Due to proximity of the Bay of Bengal there are many places to visit during the weekend. Among them Digha, Shankarpur, Mandarmani, Talsari Beach, Subarnarekha River are famous for their tourist attraction.

== Festivals ==
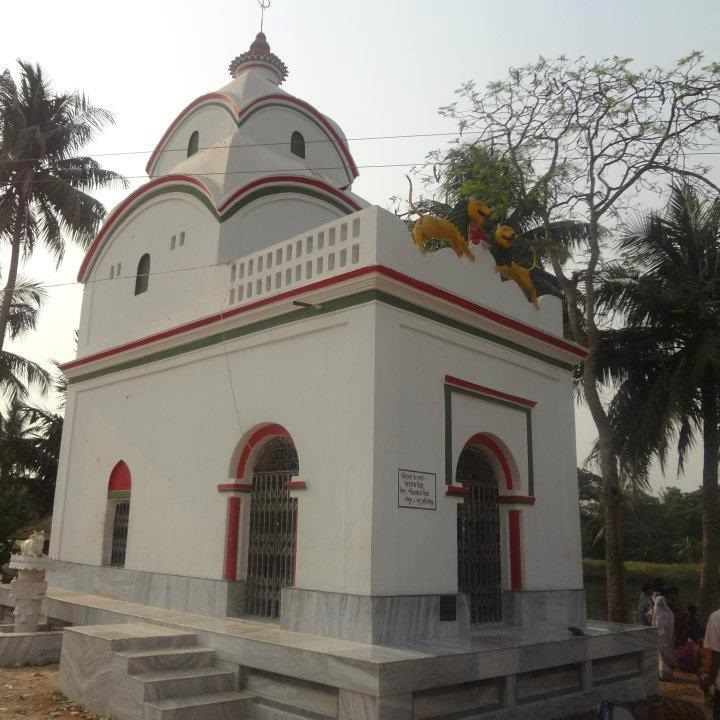
Shipur Keshabeswar Jiu Temple

Shipur is famous for its Charak Puja which is celebrated here with much enthusiasm every year during the last week of April for five days. Hindu Lord Shiva is named here as Lord Keshabeswar and this enchanting festival, as people believe, is organized to satisfy him.
