= Bhogpur railway station =

Railway station in West Bengal, India

Bhogpur
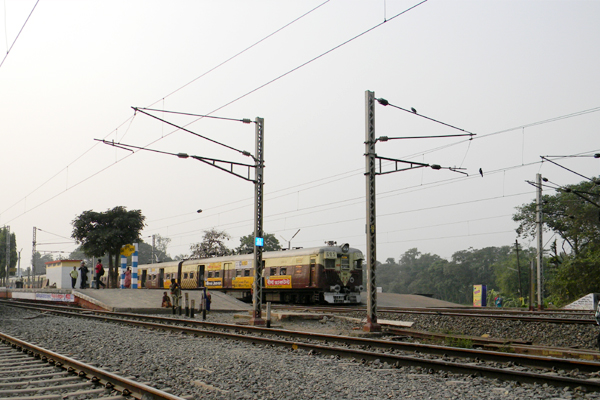
- Bhogpur railway station

General information
- Location: Bhogpur, Purba Medinipur district
- Coordinates: 22°24′07″N 87°48′34″E
- System: Kolkata Suburban Railway station
- Owner: Indian Railways
- Line: Howrah–Kharagpur line
- Platforms: 4

Construction
- Structure type: Standard on-ground station
- Parking: No
- Cycle facilities: No

Other information
- Station code: BOP
- Fare zone: South Eastern Railway

Services
Preceding station	Kolkata Suburban Railway	Following station
Narayan Pakuria Murail towards Midnapore	South Eastern Line Howrah–Kharagpur line	Nandaigajan towards Howrah Junction
Route map
Location
- Location within West Bengal Location within India

The Bhogpur railway station is situated in Bhogpur in the district of Purba Medinipur in West Bengal in the South Eastern Railway Zone, India. The station lies between Howrah and Kharagpur. Special EMU trains are available here, and local EMU trains Howrah–Panskura, Howrah–Balichak, Howrah–Kharagpur, Howrah–Medinipur, Howrah–Haldia stop here. Also a few MEMU and passenger trains are available here, MEMU trains to TATA, BELDA are available here. Also trains to Digha and Puri also stop here. One pair of Santragachi–Digha and Mecheda–Digha trains are available here. The station has four platforms.

Approximately 15 villages use this station. people use this station to reach Kolkata. Local trains take 1.5 hours to reach to Howrah station. This station is in between Nandaigazan and Naryan pakuriya Murail Rail station. Panskura and Mecheda are large rail stations situated near this station. The first train to Howrah is at 3.09 am and last train to Howrah is 11.44 pm. The first train to Kharagpur is at 3.54 am and last is at 1.41 am.

Bhogpur railway station was opened in 1900.
