= Kharipukuria =

- Location in West Bengal, India Kharipukuria (India)
- Coordinates: 21.895576°N 87.750577°E
- Country: India
- State: West Bengal
- District: Purba Medinipur

Population (2011)
  - Total: 0

Languages
  - Official: Bengali, English
- Time zone: UTC+5:30 (IST)
- PIN: 721444 (Nachinda Bazar)
- Telephone/STD code: 03220
- Lok Sabha constituency: Kanthi
- Vidhan Sabha constituency: Kanthi Uttar
- Website: purbamedinipur.gov.in

Kharipukuria is a village in Contai III CD block in Contai subdivision of Purba Medinipur district in the state of West Bengal, India.

== Geography ==
Cities and towns in Contai subdivision of Purba Medinipur district
M: municipal city/ town, CT: census town, R: rural/ urban centre, H: historical/ religious entre, S: port, sea-beach
Owing to space constraints in the small map, the actual locations in a larger map may vary slightly

=== Location ===
Kharipukuria is located at 21.895576°N 87.750577°E .

=== Urbanisation ===
93.55% of the population of Contai subdivision live in the rural areas. Only 6.45% of the population live in the urban areas and it is considerably behind Haldia subdivision in urbanization, where 20.81% of the population live in urban areas.

Note: The map alongside presents some of the notable locations in the subdivision. All places marked in the map are linked in the larger full screen map.

== Demographics ==
As per 2011 Census of India Kharipukuria had a total population of 2,470 of which 0 (0%) were males and 2,470 (100%) were females. Population below 6 years was 257. The total number of literates in Kharipukuria was 2,069 (93.49% of the population over 6 years).

== Transport ==
Kharipukuria is off National Highway 116B, locally popular as Digha Road.

== Healthcare ==
Kharipukuria Block Primary Health Centre at Kharipukuria, PO Nachinda Bazar (with 10 beds) is the main medical facility in Contai III CD block. There are primary health centres at Banamalichatta (with 10 beds), Bhaitgarh (with ? beds) and Deulbarh (with 2 beds).
