= Marishda =

- Village
- Location in West Bengal, India Marishda (India)
- Coordinates: 21°51′10.6″N 87°44′36.6″E
- Country: India
- State: West Bengal
- District: Purba Medinipur

Population (2011)
  - Total: 5,953

Languages
  - Official: Bengali, English
- Time zone: UTC+5:30 (IST)
- PIN: 721449 (Marishda)
- Telephone/STD code: 03224
- Lok Sabha constituency: Kanthi
- Vidhan Sabha constituency: Kanthi Uttar
- Website: purbamedinipur.gov.in

Marishda is a village, in Contai III CD block in Contai subdivision of Purba Medinipur district in the state of West Bengal, India.

== Geography ==
Cities and towns in Contai subdivision of Purba Medinipur district
M: municipal city/ town, CT: census town, R: rural/ urban centre, H: historical/ religious centre, S: port, sea-beach
Owing to space constraints in the small map, the actual locations in a larger map may vary slightly

=== Police station ===
Marishda police station has jurisdiction over Contai III CD block. It covers an area of 155.52 km^{2} with a population of 133,079. It is located at Marishda Bazar.

=== CD block HQ ===
The headquarters of Contai III CD block are located at Marishda.

=== Urbanisation ===
93.55% of the population of Contai subdivision live in the rural areas. Only 6.45% of the population live in the urban areas and it is considerably behind Haldia subdivision in urbanization, where 20.81% of the population live in urban areas.

Note: The map alongside presents some of the notable locations in the subdivision. All places marked in the map are linked in the larger full screen map.

== Demographics ==
As per 2011 Census of India Marishda had a total population of 5,953 of which 3,049 (51%) were males and 2,904 (49%) were females. Population below 6 years was 619. The total number of literates in Marishda was 4,571 (85.70% of the population over 6 years).

== Transport ==
SH 4 connecting Jhalda (in Purulia district) and Digha (in Purba Medinipur district) passes through Marishda.
