= Bhupatinagar =

- Village
- Location in West Bengal, India Bhupatinagar (India)
- Coordinates: 22°00′02.4″N 87°43′41.3″E
- Country: India
- State: West Bengal
- District: Purba Medinipur

Population (2011)
  - Total: 5,149

Languages
  - Official: Bengali, English
- Time zone: UTC+5:30 (IST)
- PIN: 721425 (Bhupatinagar)
- Lok Sabha constituency: Kanthi
- Vidhan Sabha constituency: Bhagabanpur
- Website: purbamedinipur.gov.in

Bhupatinagar is a village, in Bhagabanpur II CD block in Contai subdivision of Purba Medinipur district in the state of West Bengal, India.

== Geography ==
Cities and towns in Contai subdivision of Purba Medinipur district
M: municipal city/ town, CT: census town, R: rural/ urban centre, H: historical/ religious centre, S: port, sea-beach
Owing to space constraints in the small map, the actual locations in a larger map may vary slightly

=== Police station ===
Bhupatinagar police station has jurisdiction over Bhagabanpur II CD block. It covers an area of 179.23 km^{2} with a population of 14,258.

=== CD block HQ ===
The headquarters of Bhagabanpur II CD block are located at Bhupatinagar.

=== Urbanisation ===
93.55% of the population of Contai subdivision live in the rural areas. Only 6.45% of the population live in the urban areas and it is considerably behind Haldia subdivision in urbanization, where 20.81% of the population live in urban areas.

Note: The map alongside presents some of the notable locations in the subdivision. All places marked in the map are linked in the larger full screen map.

== Demographics ==
As per 2011 Census of India Bhupatinagar had a total population of 5,149 of which 2,661 (52%) were males and 2,488 (48%) were females. Population below 6 years was 468. The total number of literates in Bhupatinagar was 4,413 (94.27% of the population over 6 years).

== Transport ==
Lalat-Janka Road passes through Bhupatinagar.

== Education ==
Mugberia Gangadhar Mahavidyalaya was established in 1964. It is affiliated to Vidyasagar University and offers courses in arts, science and commerce. It also offers degree and post-graduate courses in physical education. The college is named after Raisaheb Gangadhar Nanda.

== Healthcare ==
Bhupatinagar Mugberia Rural Hospital at Bhupatinagar (with 30 beds) is the main medical facility in Bhagabanpur II CD block. There are primary health centres at Barberia (with 10 beds) and Simulia (with 6 beds).
