= Palpara, Purba Medinipur =

Palpara
- Village
- Location in West Bengal, India Palpara (India)
- Coordinates: 22°04′59.2″N 87°39′55.1″E
- Country: India
- State: West Bengal
- District: Purba Medinipur

Population (2011)
  - Total: 7,007

Languages
  - Official: Bengali, English
- Time zone: UTC+5:30 (IST)
- Telephone/STD code: 03220
- Lok Sabha constituency: Kanthi
- Vidhan Sabha constituency: Patashpur
- Website: purbamedinipur.gov.in

Palpara is a village, in Patashpur I CD Block in Egra subdivision of Purba Medinipur district in the state of West Bengal, India.

== Geography ==
Cities and towns in Egra subdivision of Purba Medinipur district
M: municipal city/ town, CT: census town, R: rural/ urban centre, H: historical/ religious centre.
Owing to space constraints in the small map, the actual locations in a larger map may vary slightly

=== Location ===
Palpara is located at 22°04′59.2″N 87°39′55.1″E.

=== Urbanisation ===
96.96% of the population of Egra subdivision live in the rural areas. Only 3.04% of the population live in the urban areas, and that is the lowest proportion of urban population amongst the four subdivisions in Purba Medinipur district.

Note: The map alongside presents some of the notable locations in the subdivision. All places marked in the map are linked in the larger full screen map.

== Demographics ==
As per 2011 Census of India Palpara had a total population of 7,007 of which 3,559 (51%) were males and 3,448 (49%) were females. Population below 6 years was 889. The total number of literates in Palpara was 5,135 (83.93% of the population over 6 years).

== Transport ==
The Egra-Patashpur-Amarshi-Bhagabanpur-Bajkul Road passes through Palpara.

== Education ==
Yogoda Satsanga Palpara Mahavidyalaya was established in 1964. It is affiliated to Vidyasagar University and offers courses in science and arts, and B.Ed. Janardan Sahu contributed substantially to the establishment of the college.

== Healthcare ==
Gonara Block Primary Health Centre at Golara Nij, PO Manglamaro (with 10 beds), the main medical facility in Patashpur I CD block, is located nearby.
