= Tamralipta Kingdom =

Ancient port city of Bengal, India

Tamralipta
- Tamralipti shown in eastern India, c. 375 CE
- Historical era: Ancient India
- Today part of: India

Tamralipta or Tamralipti (Pali: Tāmaliti) was an ancient port city, located on the coast of the Bay of Bengal. It was the capital of ancient Suhma and Vanga kingdom in Bengal. The Tamluk town in present-day Purba Medinipur, West Bengal, is generally identified as the site of Tamralipti.

It was located near the Rupnarayan river. It gets its name from the Sanskrit term "Tāmra", or copper, which was mined nearby at Ghatsila in the Singbhum region of the Chota Nagpur Plateau and traded through this port. During the Gupta dynasty, Tamralipta was the main emporium, serving as a point of departure for trade with Ceylon, Java, and China, as well as the west. It was linked by roads with the major cities of ancient India of that time, i.e., Rajagriha, Shravasti, Pataliputra, Varanasi, Champa, Kaushambi, and Taxila.

== History ==
Tamralipta was surrounded in the south by the Bay of Bengal, east by the river Rupnarayana, and west by the river Subarnarekha. The Bay of Bengal, along with these incredible waterways, and their innumerable branches, built up an affluent and easy water navigation framework that cultivated commerce, culture, and early contacts with people from other parts of the world. The origins of Tamralipta are obscure. Many historians date its settlement to the seventh century B.C., but archaeological remains indicate its continuous settlement from about the third century B.C. Several literary sources, archaeological finds, epigraphy, and numismatic evidence are studied to construct the history of Tamralipta.

=== Literary Sources ===
In early Indian literary works, Tamralipta, with its other "dialectical variants", was mentioned. (Note: i.e., Tamralipti, Tamalitti, Tamalitta, Damalipta, Tamraliptika, etc. Abhidhānachintāmani confirms that, Dāmalipta,Tāmralipta,Tāmalinī,Stambhapura and Vishnugriha are synonyms to Tāmraliptī.) It was also mentioned by the Greek astronomer-geographer Ptolemy, the Roman author and philosopher Pliny, and the Chinese monk travellers Faxian, Xuanzang, and Yijing. The Kurma-vibhaga segment of the Atharva-veda Parisista incorporates the primal testimony to Tamralipta in Indian literary sources. The Mahabharata distinguishes this ancient city from Suhma, but a later work, Dashakumaracharita, adds "Damalipta" within the Suhma kingdom. It is said that Tamralipta was the capital of Suhma. In the Raghuvamsha, it is described as being located on the bank of the river Kapisa. The Kathsaritsagara observes Tamralipta as an important maritime port and trading center. Some Pali literature identifies it as "Tamalitti" or "Tamalitthi" and describes it as a port. Tamralipti is mentioned numerous times in the Arthasastra as an imperative center of maritime exchange. The Brihat-Samhita distinguishes "Tamraliptika" from "Gaudaka" and mentions the sailing of ships from Yavana to the port of "Damalipta". Ptolemy mentions "Tāmralipta" (Note: In the map of the Greek geographer Ptolemy, "Tāmralipta" appears as Tamalities.) as a significant town and royal residence. Pliny denotes Tamralipti as 'Taluctae'. The earliest meticulous description of Tamralipta appears in Buddhist literature. (Note: Tamralipta had a deep connection with Buddhism. It is said that Bodhidrum was sent to Ceylon from Tamralipti. Jataka often mentions trade and missionary voyages from Tamralipta to Suvarnabhumi (Myanmar/Southeast Asia). Pandit, Shashwati (2021), Bargabhima temple: seeking an unknown mystery., p. 1599) In the early fifth century CE, the Chinese Buddhist monk Fa-Hien reported seeing twenty Buddhist monasteries in Tamralipta. Fa-Hien traces Tamralipta, as situated on the seaboard. Whereas Hiuen-Tsang describes that Tamralipta (Note: Hiuen-Tsang denoted Tāmralipta as "Tan-mo-li-ti".) was situated on a creek relatively away from the main Bay of Bengal. According to Hiuen-Tsang, this port town spanned approximately 250 miles and served as the point of convergence of the land and sea trade routes. According to him, the main exports from Tamralipta port were indigo, silk, and copper. In c. 675, the Chinese Buddhist monk YiJing reached the east coast of India. He spent five months in Tamralipti and learned Sanskrit. Yijing travelled up the Ganga from Tamralipti to the Buddhist monastery complex of Nalanda, which was the home of thirty-five hundred monks at that time. According to Mahavamsa, an epic history of Sri Lanka, it was the exit point for Ruler Vijaya's voyage to conquer Sri Lanka and the Buddhist mission propelled to Sri Lanka by the Mauryan emperor Ashoka. (Note: In Mahavamsa Tamralipta is denoted as "Tamalitti".) Tamralipta is mentioned in Dipavamsa as well. The Vanga is referred to as possessing the city of Tamralipta in one of the Jaina Upangas called Prajñāpanā. (Note: The Prajñāpanā denoted Tāmralipta as "Tamalitti".) According to the Jain texts, Tamralipta was the capital of the kingdom of Vanga. Tamralipta is mentioned as one of the Jaina ascetic orders in the Jaina Kalpasūtra.

=== Archaeological finds ===
Archaeological explorations have unveiled a chronology of habitations extending back to a period in which stone axes and rudimentary pottery were in use. Excavations in the Indian state of West Bengal have revealed a steatite seal with hieroglyphic and pictographic signs, thought to be of the Mediterranean root. Terracotta figurines, spindle-whorls and earthenware are accepted to be from Crete and Egypt. Findings in Tamralipta unearthed potteries characterized by rouletted ware, grey ware, redware, black polished ware, and northern black polished ware. The excavation carried out by the Archaeological Survey of India (ASI) discovered rammed floor levels and ring wells. Coins and terracotta figurines dating back to the Sunga period (3rd century B.C.) have been discovered during excavations at a site in Tamralipti. (Note: The Tamluk Museum's holdings include terracotta sculptures of yaksis, animals, and plaques showing the daily lives of ordinary men and women. The famous Yaksi figurine is now preserved in the Ashmolean Museum in Oxford.) A brick-built stepped tank, dating back to the 2nd–3rd century A.D., was unearthed among the ancient structural remains of Tamralipta. Excavations at Moghalmari confirmed the presence of Buddhist vihars in the area, which was mentioned by Chinese travellers Fa Hien and Hiuen Tsang.

=== Epigraphy and numismatic evidence ===
Coins with engraved boat symbols, issued by the Satavahana Kings, were found on the Andhra coast. Punch mark coins with similar motifs were also excavated from different sites in Bengal. (Note: Two types of cast coins are found: 1. the rectangular type and 2. the round type.) This evidence confirms brisk maritime activity in Bengal. The Roman gold coins found in Tamralipta indicate contact with the Romans. The terracotta seals, protected in the Tamralipta museum as examined by Mukherjee, are inscribed in the Kharoshti Brahmi script of the early centuries of the Christian era. The vessel depicted on the seal of Bangarh is a bowl-shaped sailing boat filled with corn. The bows of the vessel at both ends are decorated with "Makaramukhas". A seal found at Chandraketugarh has a boat with a single mast portrayed on it and bears the Kharoshti-Brahmi inscription. The ship motif found on the coin of Gautamiputra Yajna Satkarni and the boat motif painted in the cave of Ajanta are identical to this vessel. An archaeological excavation in Birbhum unearthed several pieces of evidence, including coins and other artefacts. In an inscription from Java, the merchant Budhagupta is mentioned as a resident of Raktamrittika. (Note: Raktamrittika mahavihara is presently situated in the Chiruti region of the Murshidabad District.) Most likely, Budhagupta sailed down the Ganga and took a ship from Tamralipta. The Dudhpani rock inscription of Udayman is probably the last South Asian inscription that contains the record of Tamralipta as a port city in 8th-century C.E.

=== Interpretation ===
The textual references have prompted academics to identify Tamralipti as one of the most prominent hubs of trade and commerce of early historic India. (Note: Tamralipti used to be the principal trade hub of the large territory between China and Alexandria.) According to Darian, with the rise of the Mauryan Empire, Tamralipti rose to universal popularity as the chief harbour of the entire basin. Ships from Ceylon, Southeast Asia, western India, and the Middle East used to arrive at this port. The brick-built stepped tank, found in an archaeological excavation, indicates the prosperity of Tamralipta. At least from the beginning of the Christian era until the 11th or 12th century A.D., Tamralipti was an important port for the sea-borne trade of Bengal. Three significant routes of foreign exchange were transmitted from Tamralipti : one to Burma and beyond through the Arakan coast; a second to the Malaya peninsula and the Distant East via Paloura, near Chicacole; and a third to South India and Ceylon through Kalinga and the Coromandal coast. Tamralipta appears to have been connected by distinct routes with Pataliputra and Kausambi. The southern route, passing through Tamralipta and proceeding to the coastal region of Orissa, also reached as far as Kanchi in the south. Through the southern route, extra inland trade corridors in Kalinga were connected with Tamralipta. Tamralipta had multidirectional connections with diverse geographical locations of South Asia. It served as a gateway to countries such as Indonesia and as a departure point for excursions to Sri Lanka. Archaeological finds suggest the overseas connection of the Tamralipti with the Romans. According to the evidence of Kan-Tai (Fu-nan-chuan), a regular maritime route existed between China and Tamralipti in the middle of the third century A.D. A comparison between the Chandraketugarh terracottas and those recovered from Tamluk would imply that the former contained significantly more indigenous motifs, whereas at the latter site, several non-indigenous motifs have been unearthed. The existence of the Kharoshthi script in some of the inscriptions at Chandraketugarh suggests close interaction with the north-western part of the subcontinent, where this script was prominent. According to Sengupta, the difference in descriptions of the location of Tamralipta as made by Fa-Hien and Hiuen-Tsang indicates a profound geographical change that had occurred in between their visits. According to Chattopadhyay, in comparison to Chandraketugarh, the settlement aspects of Tamralipti addressed by the area of Tamluk on the right bank of the Rupnarayan, a feeder of the Bhagirathi, are as yet unclear. The existence of Painted Grey Ware and Northern Black Polished Ware in the places near the waterways of Ghaghara, Ganga and Yamuna indicate the utilization of riverine channels for the ancient commerce networks. According to Dasgupta, Despite the undeniable significance of Tamralipta, little is known about its rulers and administration. According to him, both Fa-Hien and Hiuen-Tsang, the two Chinese travellers who stayed in Tamralipta, never revealed anything about the state organization or administration.

=== Causes of decline ===
Man-made issues such as political disorder, taxes, and foreign attack, as well as natural factors such as alteration in the courses of rivers, siltation, and erosion, have all contributed to the progressive deterioration of the Tamralipta port. The Saraswati river flowed through various courses until the seventh century A.D., when it discharged through the Rupnarayan estuary. Tamralipta was located on the right bank of the Rupnarayan river. The Saraswati branch that connects it to the Rupnarayan has been identified on a recent satellite image, and a map is being prepared. Fergusson also described this channel. The eastward flight of the flow from its off-take at Tribeni, as well as rapid sedimentation, contributed to the collapse of the channel. Since 700 A.D., the Saraswati had abandoned its allegiance to the Rupnarayan and migrated eastwards, opening a new outlet along the Sankrail, resulting in the decline of the port of Tamralipta. Saptagram (colloquially known as Satgaon) emerged as a prominent port, following the demise of Tamralipta.

== Tamluk Raj ==
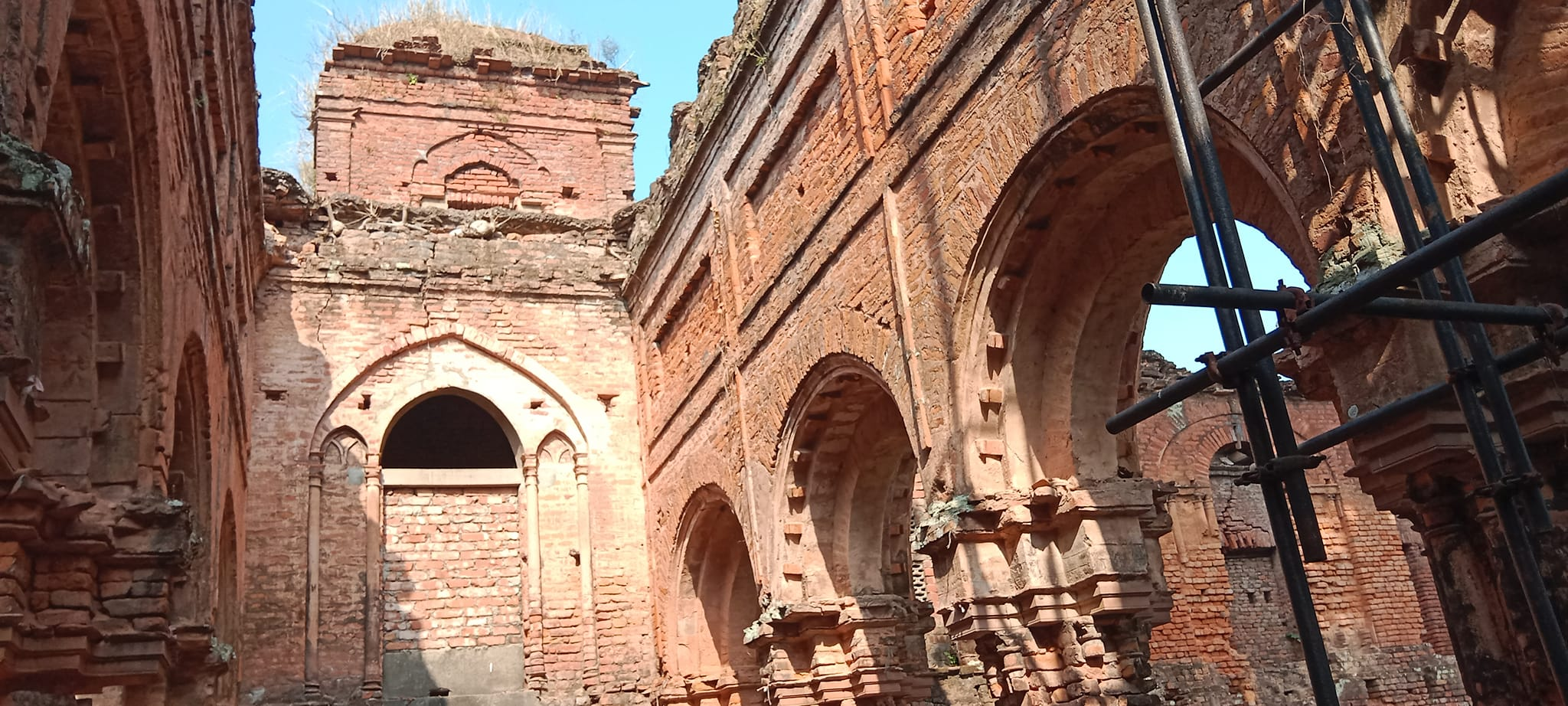
Ruins of British era underconstruction Tamluk Rajbari

The Tamluk Raj Paribar, also known as the Tamralipta Royal Family or Tamluk Raj family, is a thousand years old historical royal family from Tamluk in present-day West Bengal, India. Some historians suggest Khandayat origin, which was merely a sign of status for aboriginal Bhuiya sardars. The ruling family were known to be Kaibarttas. However, the kings themselves later identified as Mahishya.

=== Presence in mythological and ancient literature ===
According to the Rajatarangini, the Kauravas and the Pandavas are said to have appeared 753 years after the beginning of the Kaliyuga. The text also notes that during the Kurukshetra war, Tamradhwaja the son of Rajarshi Mayurdhwaja, ruler of the ancient Tamralipta kingdom and fought on the side of the Pandavas. Further support for the antiquity of the Tamralipta polity appears in the Imperial Gazetteer of India which records that the Tamralipta also called Sumha, was a kingdom covering the areas that are now Midnapur and Howrah. Its rulers were likely Mahishyas. Based on these accounts, it is inferred that Mayurdhwaja, identified by Kalhana as the earliest known king of Tamralipta, belonged to the Mahishya community. The lineage of Mahishya rulers is believed to have governed Tamralipta (Tamluk) as sovereign monarchs for an exceptionally long span traditionally estimated at about 4,000 years, from the pre-Mahabharata period up to the 17th century A.D. This extraordinarily long continuity of rule is considered unparalleled in human history even historian Biharilal Kalye also supported this view.

=== Conflict with East India Company and loss of glory ===
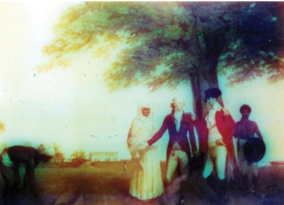
Zamindar Ananda Narayan Roy with William Dent (Tamluk)

Rani Santoshpriya leaving her share to her adopted son, Ananda Narayan Roy. Subsequently, Raja Sundar Narayan Roy obtained a decree against Rani Krishnapriya. The Government paiks were resisted and seriously injured while executing the decree, the British government confiscated the Rani's share and placed it in kids possession from 1781 to 1794. In 1789, Rani Krishnapriya died, and in 1795 the whole zamindari was permanently settled with Ananda Narayan Roy. A conflict had erupted with Rani Krishna Priya by 1781. Raja Ananda Narayan was forced to concede to the British Raj and Tamluk was turned into a small zamindary.

== Construction of the Palace ==
At one time, this royal palace was a hub of the independence movement; however, the kings of the Mayur dynasty had already been in conflict with the British rulers prior to that. It is said that eight architects from Greece were brought in to construct the palace, planning a structure based on European architectural styles, featuring arches and a spacious frontage. Construction began along these lines, with the palace built atop a central foundation and rows of rooms extending from both sides; the arched rooms remain standing to this day. Raja Lakshminarayan Ray of the Mayur dynasty of Tamralipta initiated the palace's construction in 1837 with an initial budget of two lakh rupees. While significant progress was made on the two-story structure, Raja Lakshminarayan suddenly found himself at odds with the British over a revenue dispute. At the time, the "Sunset Law" was in effect; under this rule, native kings, Zamindars, and leaseholders were required to deposit their revenue by sunset on a specific day, failing which their properties would be confiscated. Revenue had to be deposited in the town of Midnapore, but the journey was perilous due to the threat of bandits. Raja Lakshminarayan’s soldiers set out for Midnapore with the revenue via both river and land routes, only to have the funds looted by the British. Unable to deposit the revenue, a large portion of the royal family's estate was auctioned off. Lakshminarayan used to pay an annual revenue of 9 lakh 36 thousand rupees; the auctioning of his assets prevented him from completing the palace, and he was forced to manage his kingdom with whatever revenue could be collected. He even appealed to the authorities at Fort William and fought the case all the way to the Privy Council in hopes of regaining his kingdom. Later, Raja Narendranarayan undertook some work to complete the palace.

== Role in freedom movement ==
The Royal family role in shaping the Tamralipta Jatiya Sarkar in 1942 further solidifies its historical significance. Many important meetings of the Tamralipta Jatiya Sarkar took place within the grandeur of the Rajbari's building.

After downfall of the Tamralipta Jatiya Sarkar, the British police subjected the Royal family to severe brutality. Now the Tamluk Rajbari is officially recognized as a heritage site by the state government, preserving its rich history and contribution to India's freedom movement.

== Notable members of this family ==
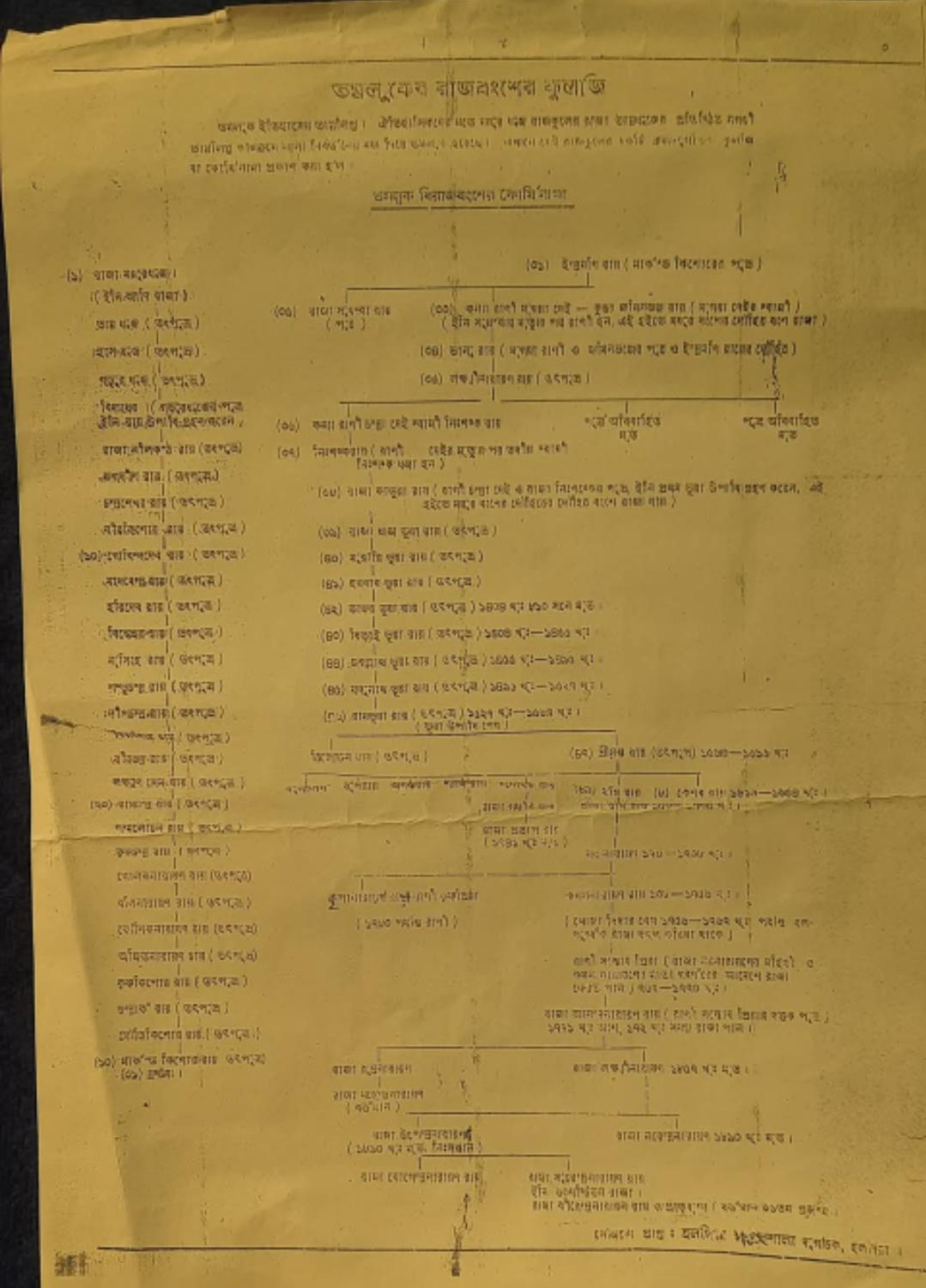
This is an old image of the Family tree of the Tamluk Raj. Recovered from their records.

- Raja Kalu Bhuiyan, founder member of the Tamluk family around 900 AD, he was a firm administrator and a capable military commander. It's said that he conducted an elaborate Ashvamedha yajna and subjugated the neighbouring Kingdoms, asserting the power and influence of Tamluk in the region.
- Rani Krishnapriya, the Queen of Tamluk, a province in present-day Purba Medinipur, West Bengal. Known for their free-spirited nature, the people of Medinipur strongly resisted colonial rule during British occupation. Queen Krishnapriya demonstrated exceptional courage by leading a revolt against the East India Company to defend her kingdom (1781). Despite her efforts, she was ultimately defeated and deposed by the British forces. Her resistance became a symbol of inspiration for countless others in the region, contributing to the broader movement for India's freedom from British rule.
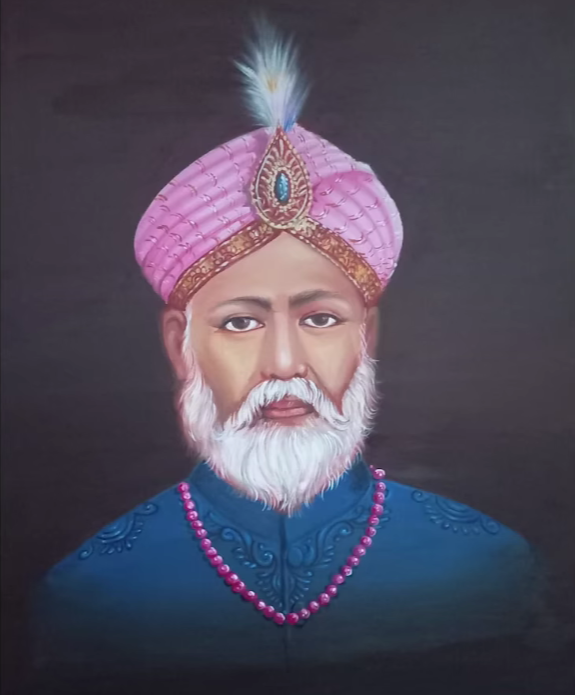
- Raja Surendra Narayan
  Raja Surendra Narayan Roy, the 60th ruler of the Tamluk royal family and a prominent freedom fighter of India's struggle for independence. He actively participated in the resistance against the partition of Bengal (1905), enduring persecution by the British authorities. In 1920, he advanced the cause of Deshapran Birendranath Sasmal in the Non Cooperation movement of 1920, by calling for a mass boycott of foreign manufactured clothes which ignited the flames of resistance in the people of Tamluk. A dedicated and principled leader, he was also instrumental in the Civil Disobedience Movement in 1930, notably offering a portion of the Tamluk Rajbari to support the Salt Satyagrahis, which led to the rise of leaders like Sushil Kumar Dhara, Satish Chandra Samanta, and the eventual Chief Minister of West Bengal, Ajoy Mukherjee. He was arrested by the British on 15th May, 1930, for his involvement in the Salt Satyagraha, but public outcry led to his release on May 22, reflecting his widespread popularity. In 1938, he hosted a meeting for Netaji Subhas Chandra Bose, even sacrificing his cherished Khosarang mango orchard for the event. Throughout his life, Raja Surendra Narayan Roy supported freedom fighters both financially and in other capacities, earning immense respect for his dedication to India's independence.

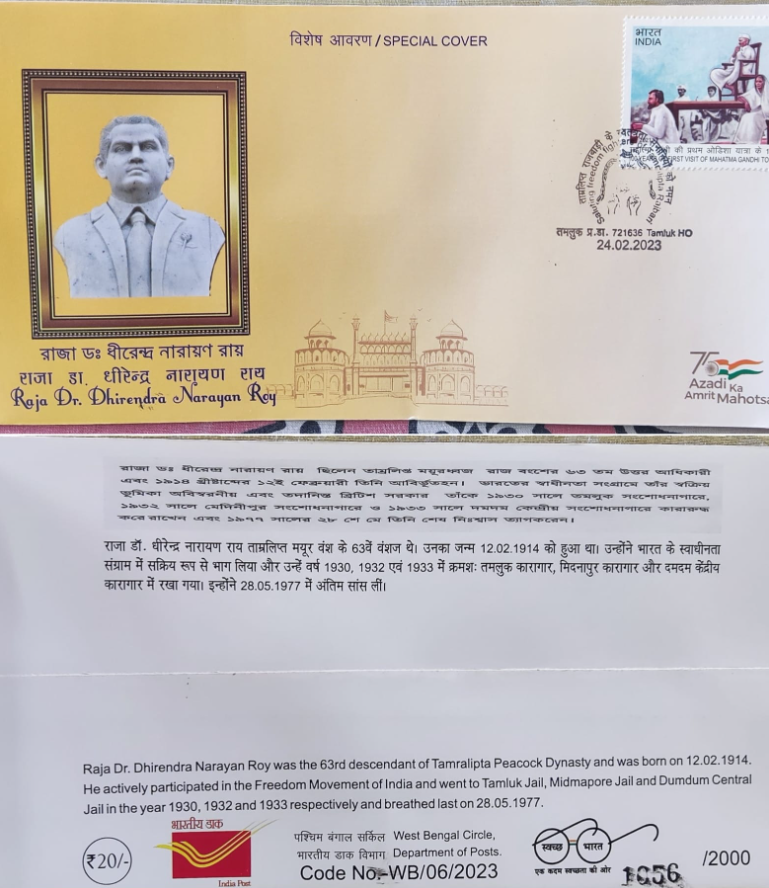
Tamluk Royal family postoffice stamp

- Dhirendra Narayan Roy: son of Raja Surendra Narayan, a notable figure of India's freedom struggle. He actively participated in the Civil Disobedience Movement in the 1930s and was arrested multiple times for his anti-British activities. While studying medicine at the Calcutta Medical College, he continued his activism and played a key role in organizing a public meeting for Netaji Subhas Chandra Bose in 1936, leading to another arrest. Upon his father's death in 1942, Dhirendra Narayan Roy became the king of Tamrolipta but prioritized India's independence over his royal duties. After independence, he focused on medical service and community welfare, dedicating himself to humanitarian efforts while avoiding political involvement. He was also a life member and officer of the World Doctors Association.

=== Tamralipta Janaswastha Krishi o Kutirshilpa Mela ===
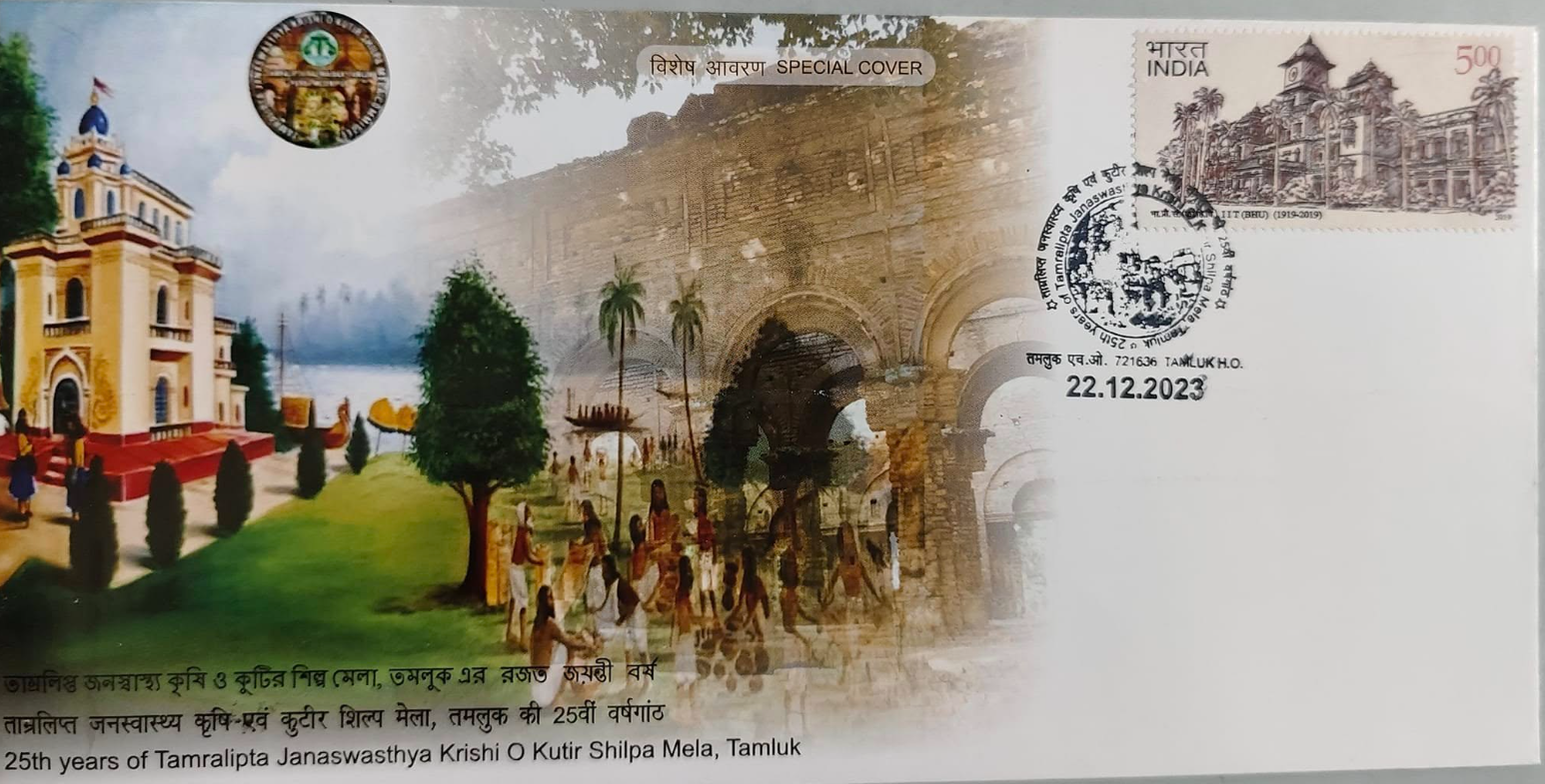
Tamralipta Janaswastha Krishi o kutirshilpa mela stamp (25 yr)

35th King of Tamralipta Mayur Dynasty, Raja Lakshmi Narayan Roy started one mela 973 years ago, which was stopped during British period. The age-old historical traditional mela was resumed in 1998 with new name "Tamralipta Janaswastha Kishi O Kutir Shilpa Mela, Tamluk".

== Temples ==
- Bargabhima Temple: It's believed Kalu Bhuiya established the Bargabhima Temple (among 51 Shakta Pithas) around 1150 year back.
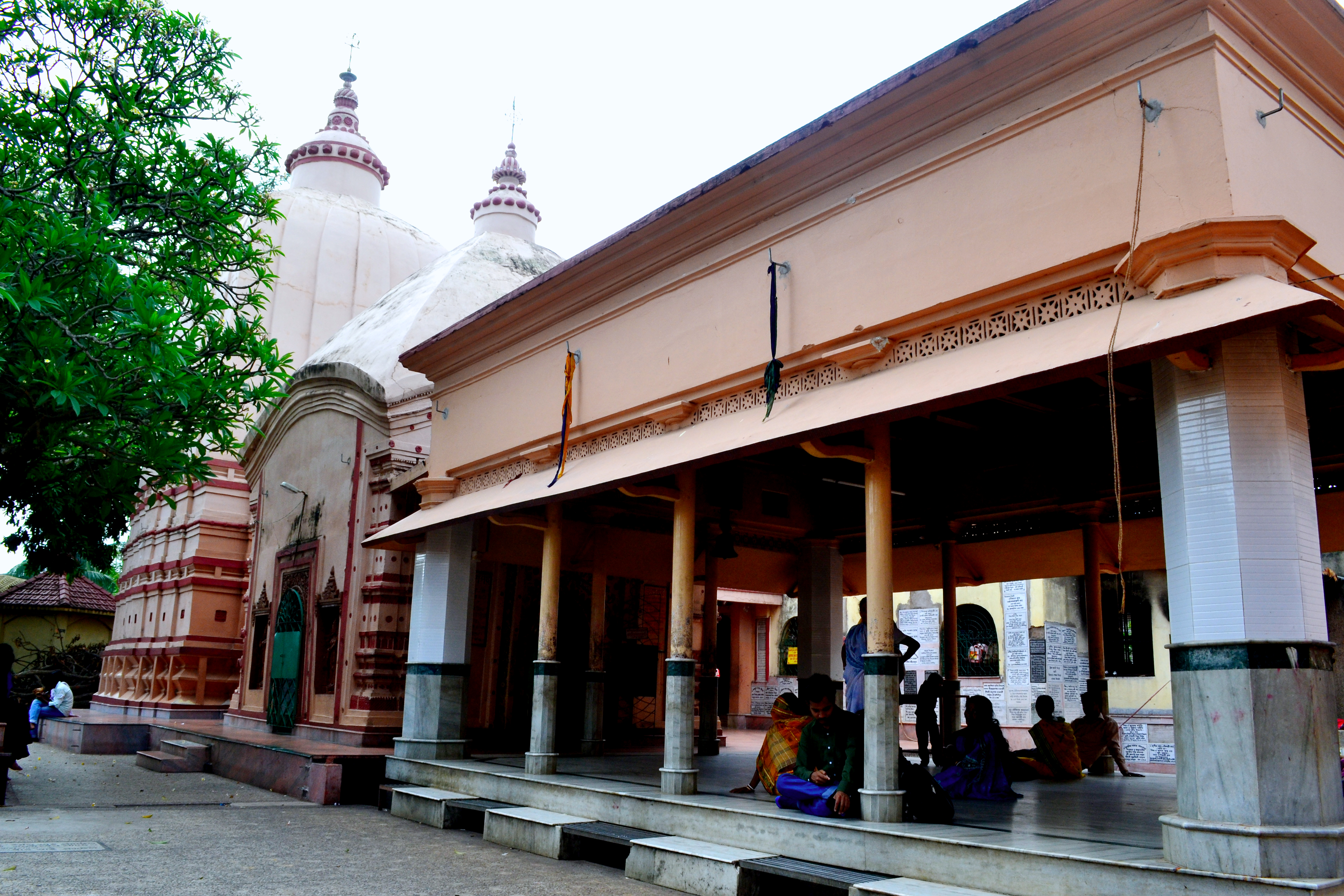
  Bargabhima Temple (Saktipith)
- Jishnu Hari Temple- The Jishnu Hari Temple in Tamluk, according to the local legends that this is a significant religious site which was established by the first king of this dynasty.

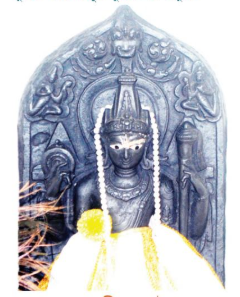
Jishnu Narayan murti

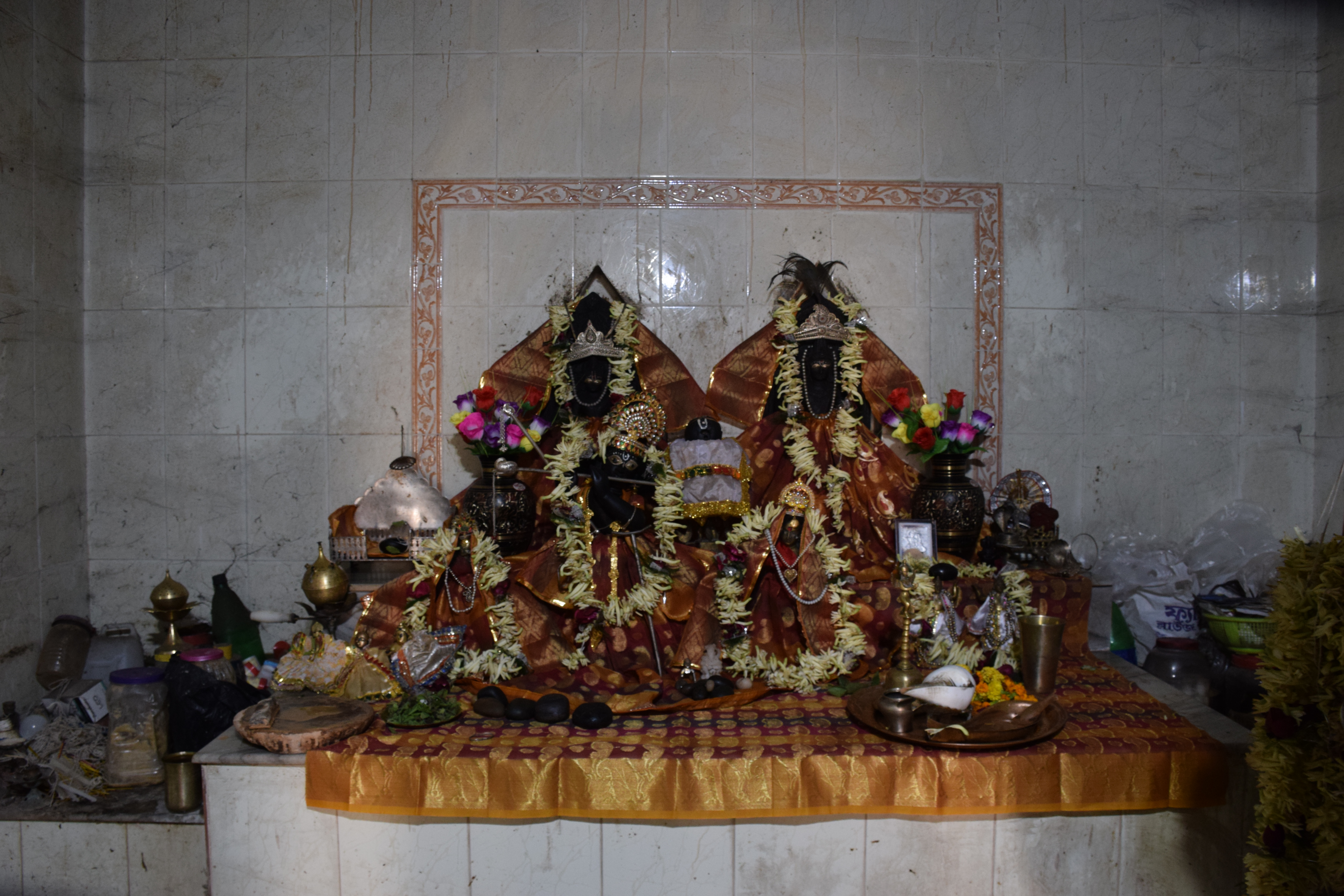
Jishnu Hari

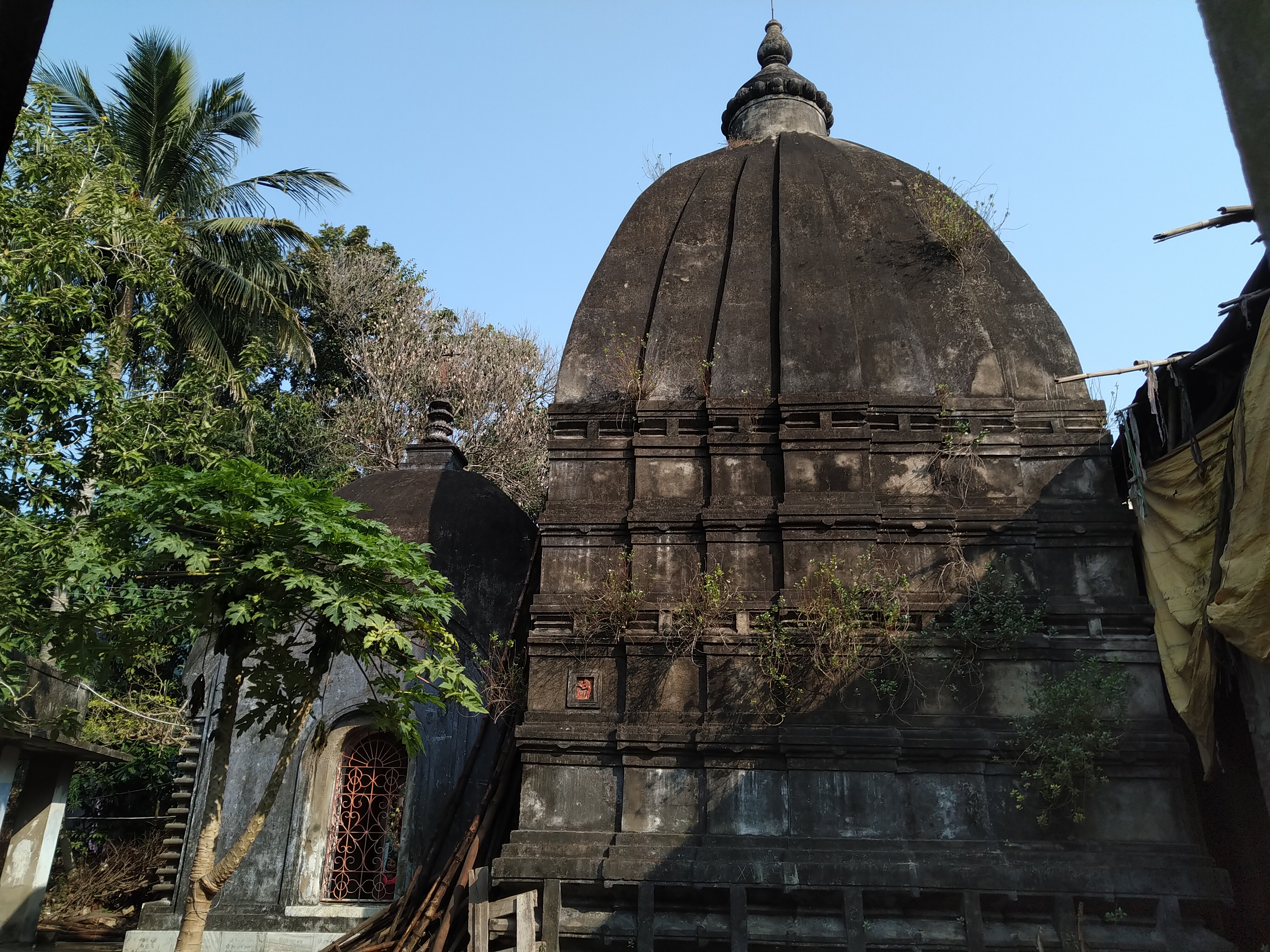
Jishnu Hari temple

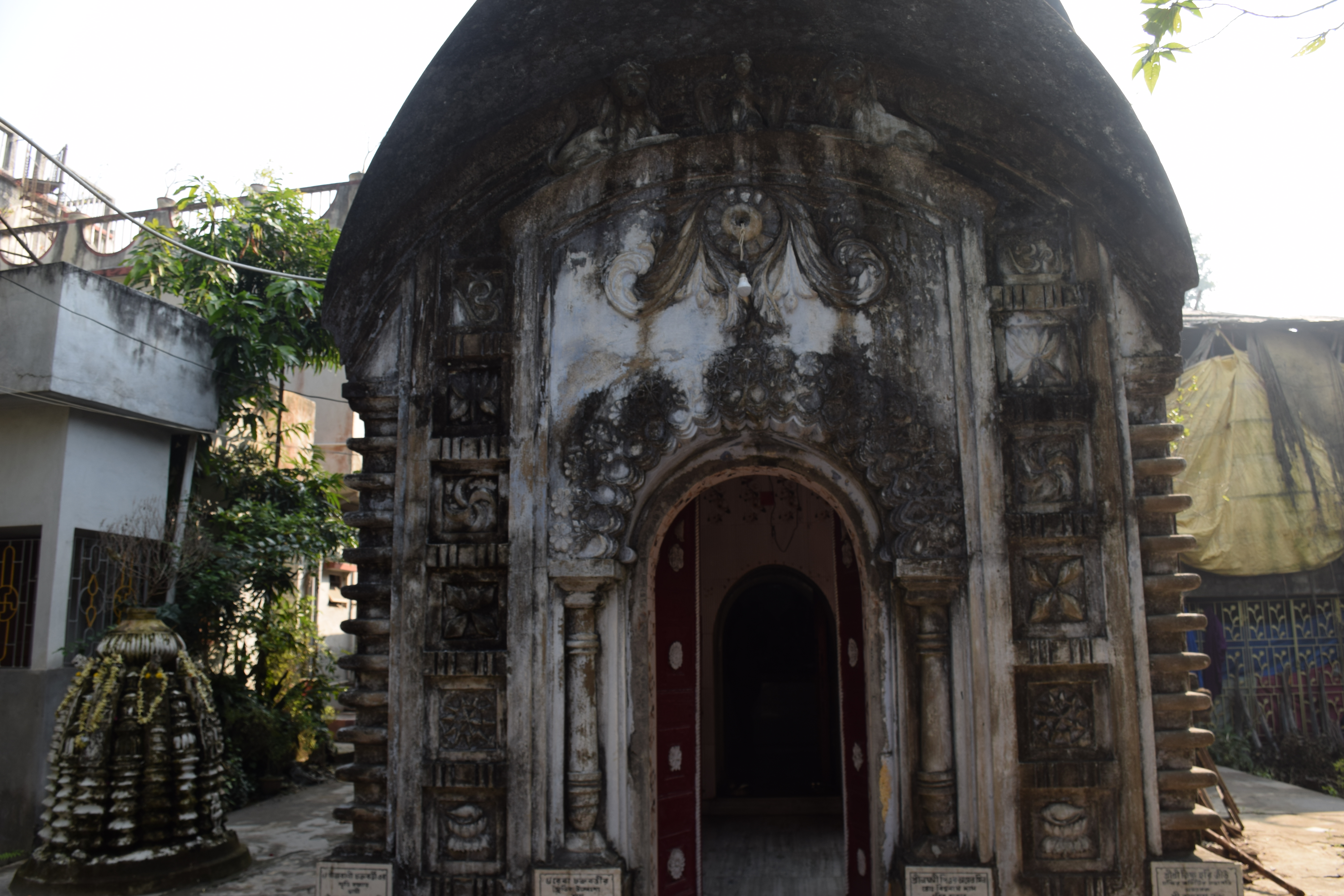
Temple front view

== Ruins of Tamluk Rajbari ==
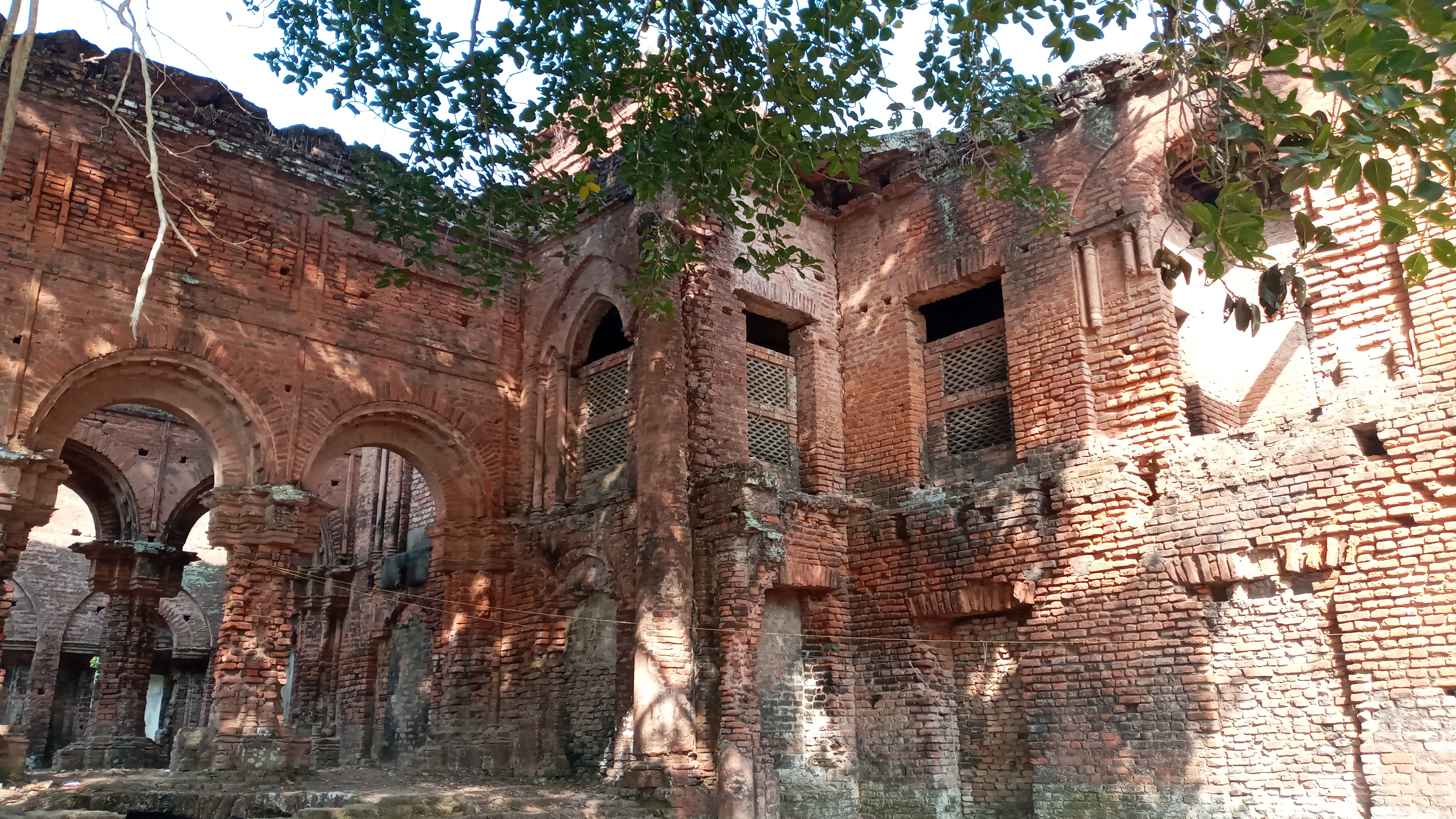
Older portion of the Tamluk Rajbari showing the arches of the gateway

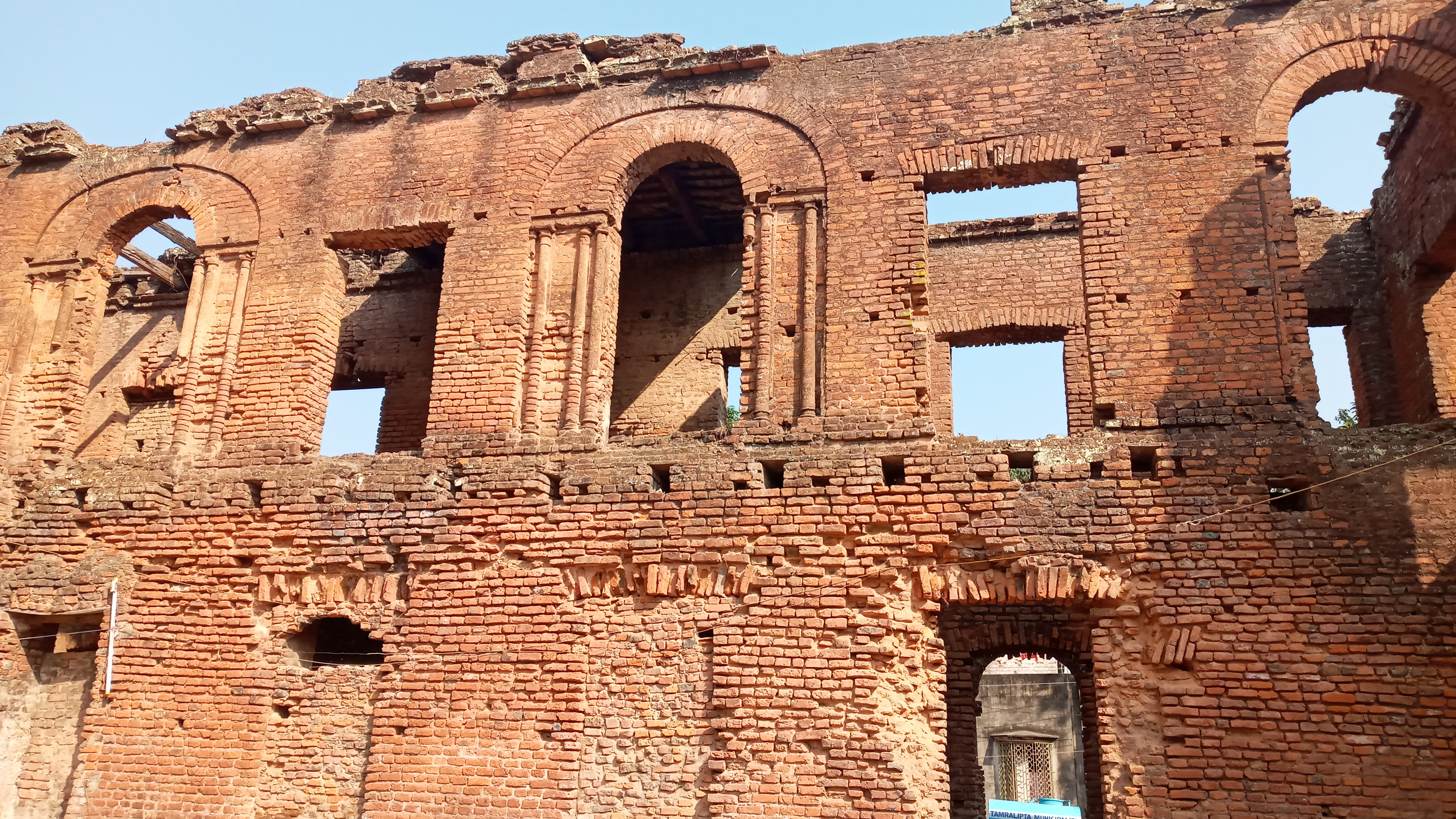
Older portion of the Tamluk Rajbari

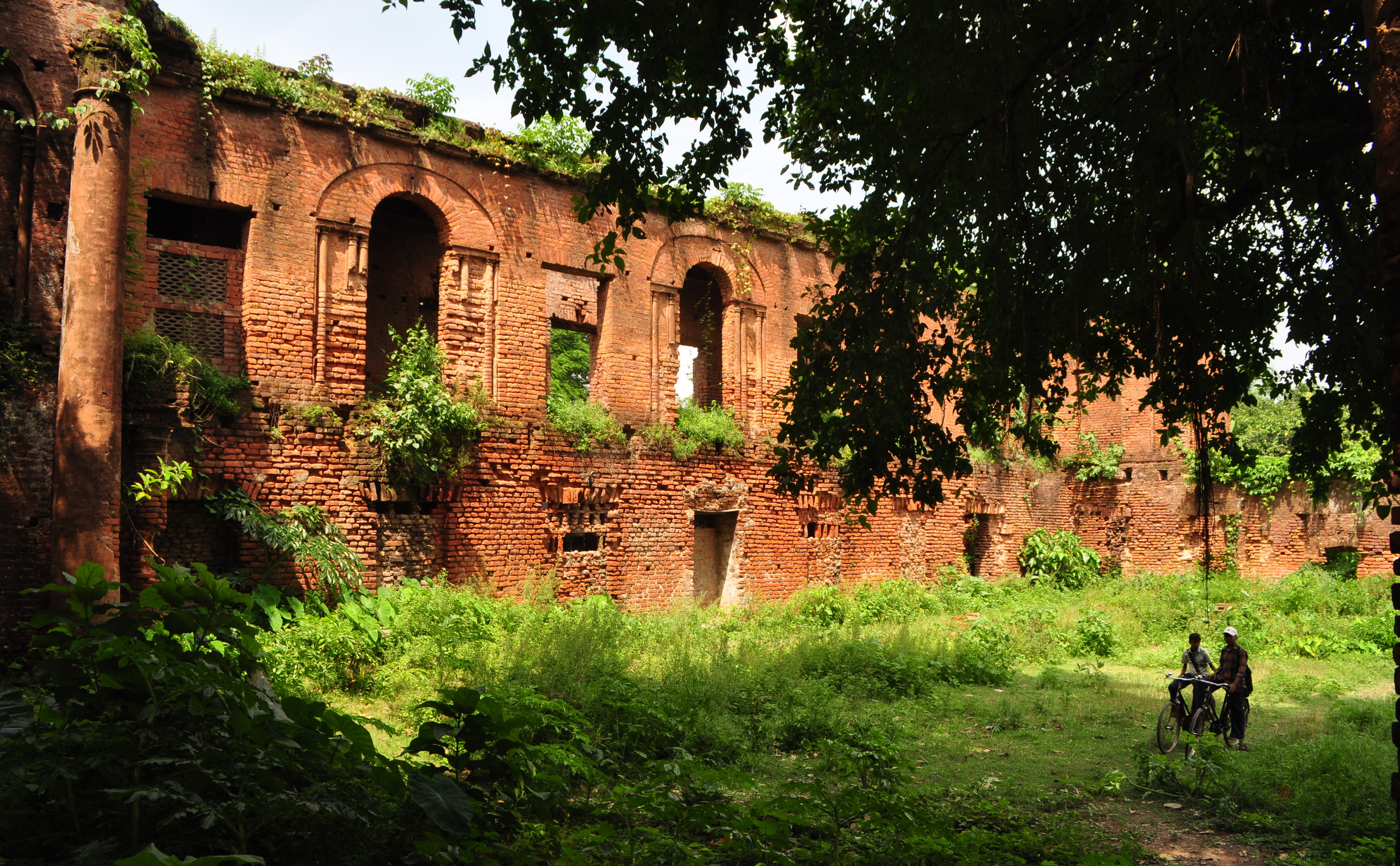
Ruined parts of the fort.

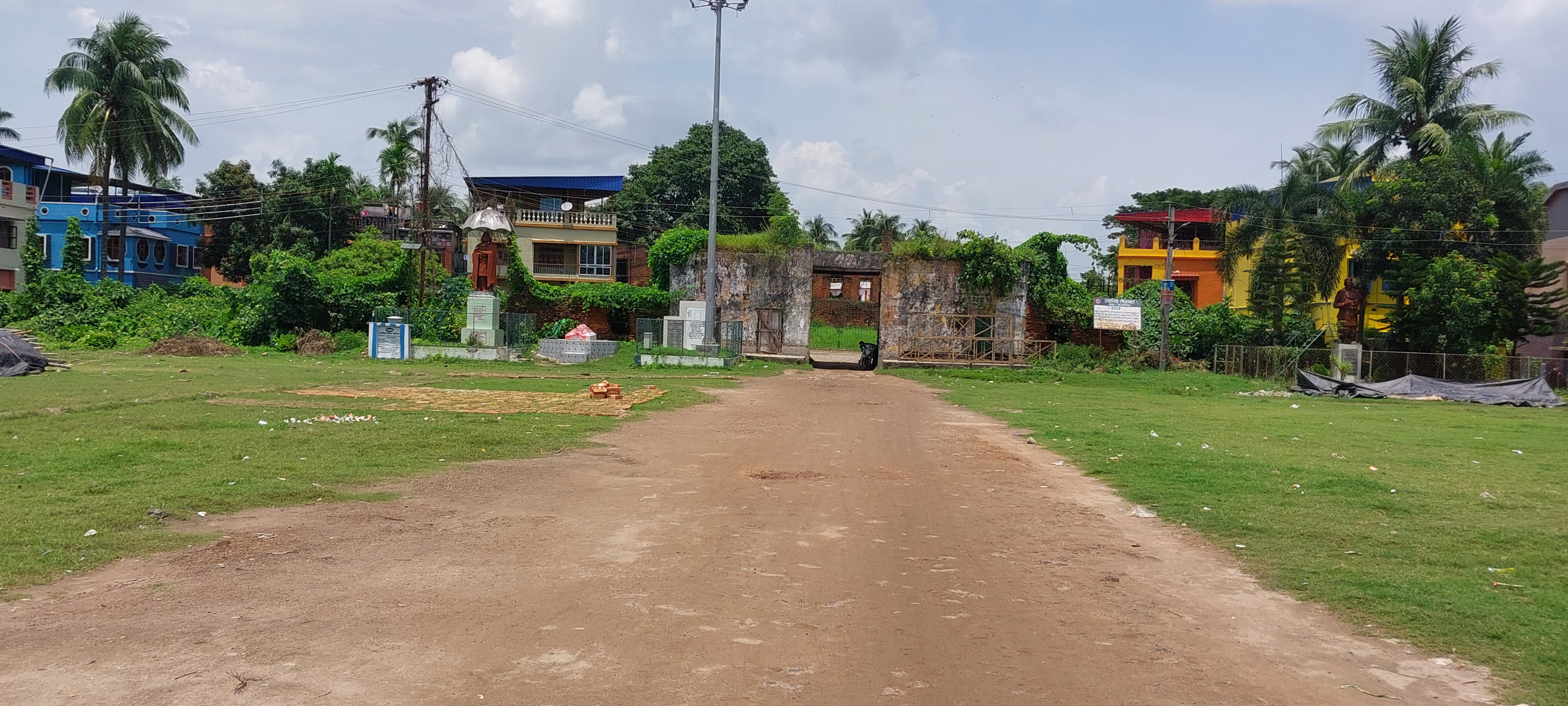
Boundaries observed from a distance

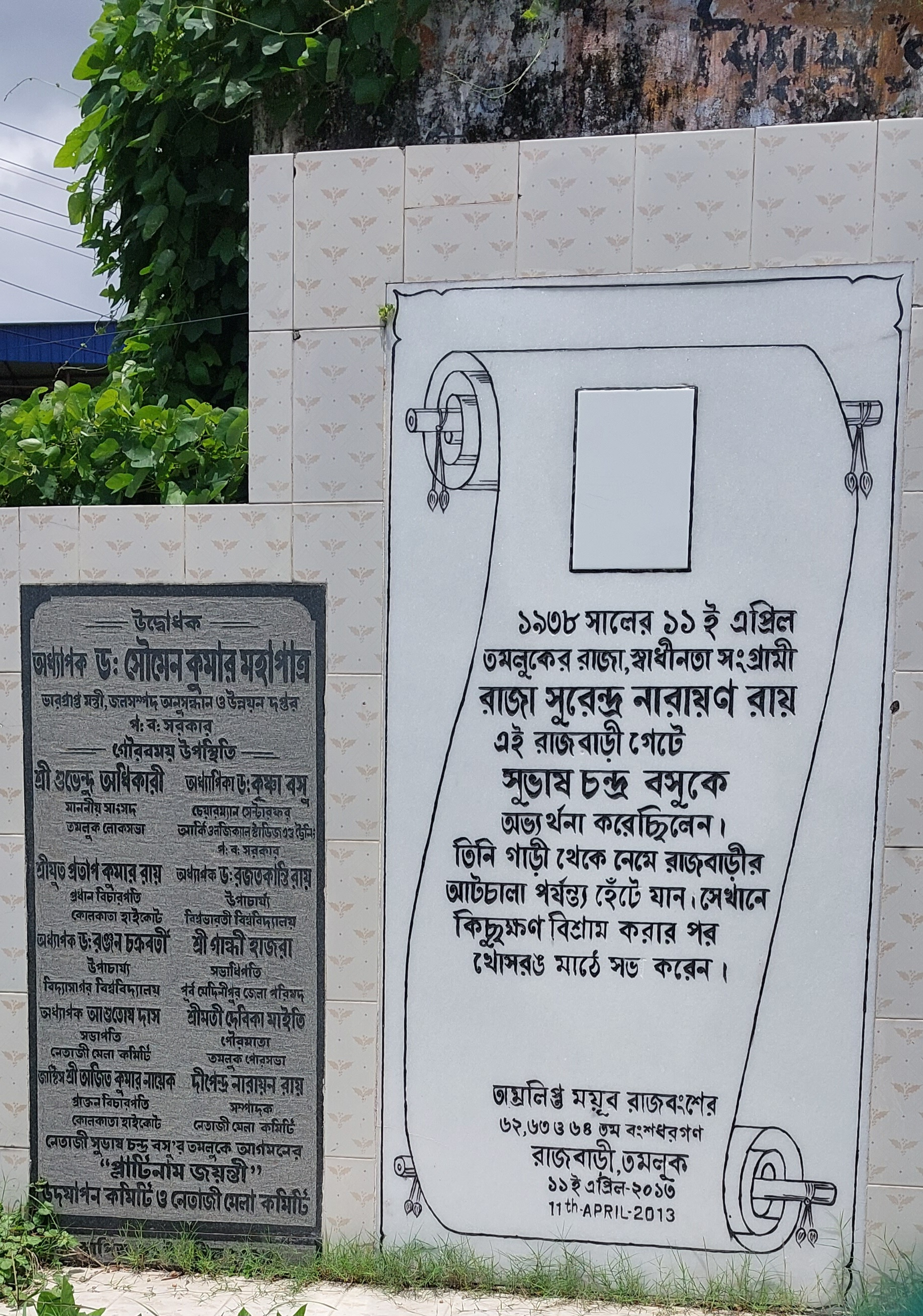
Commemorative plaques

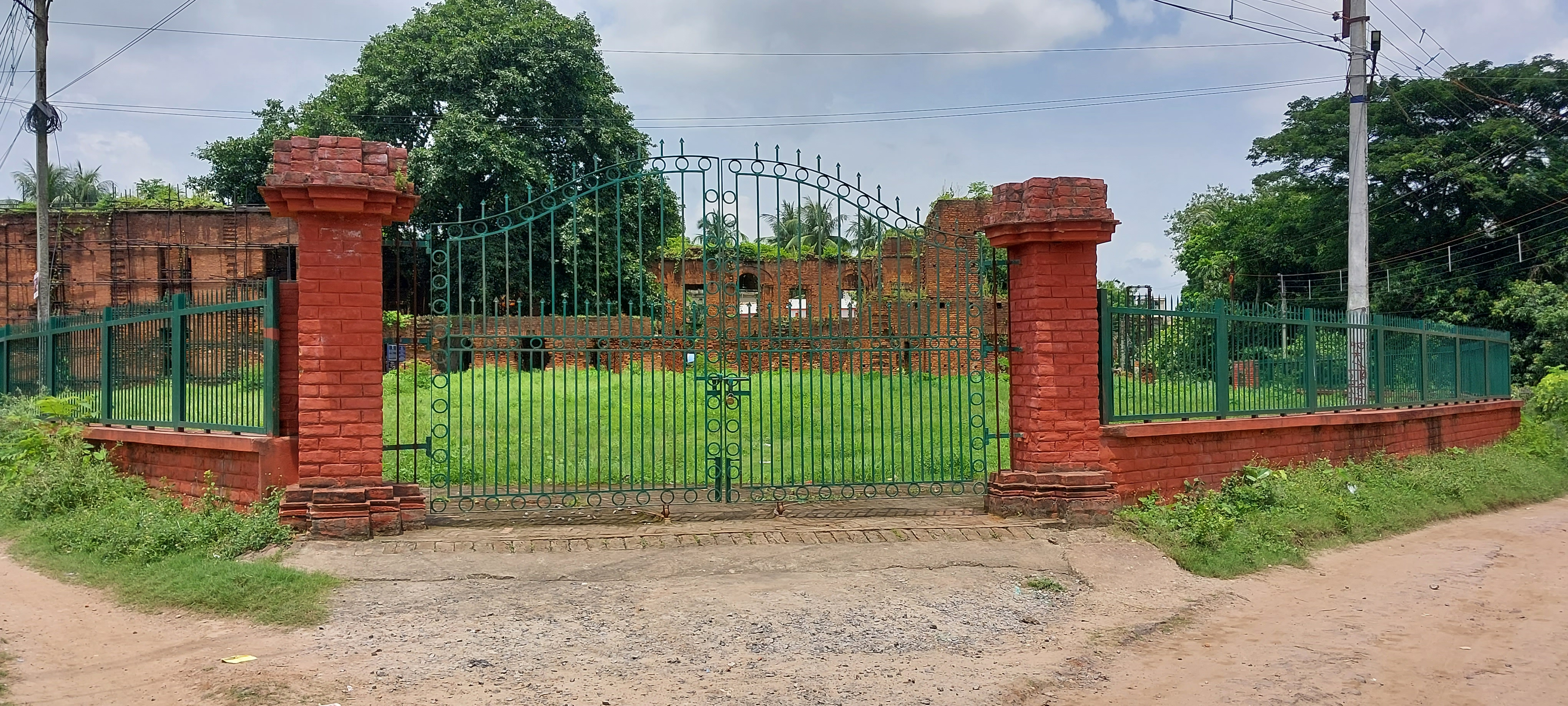
Gate of the Palace

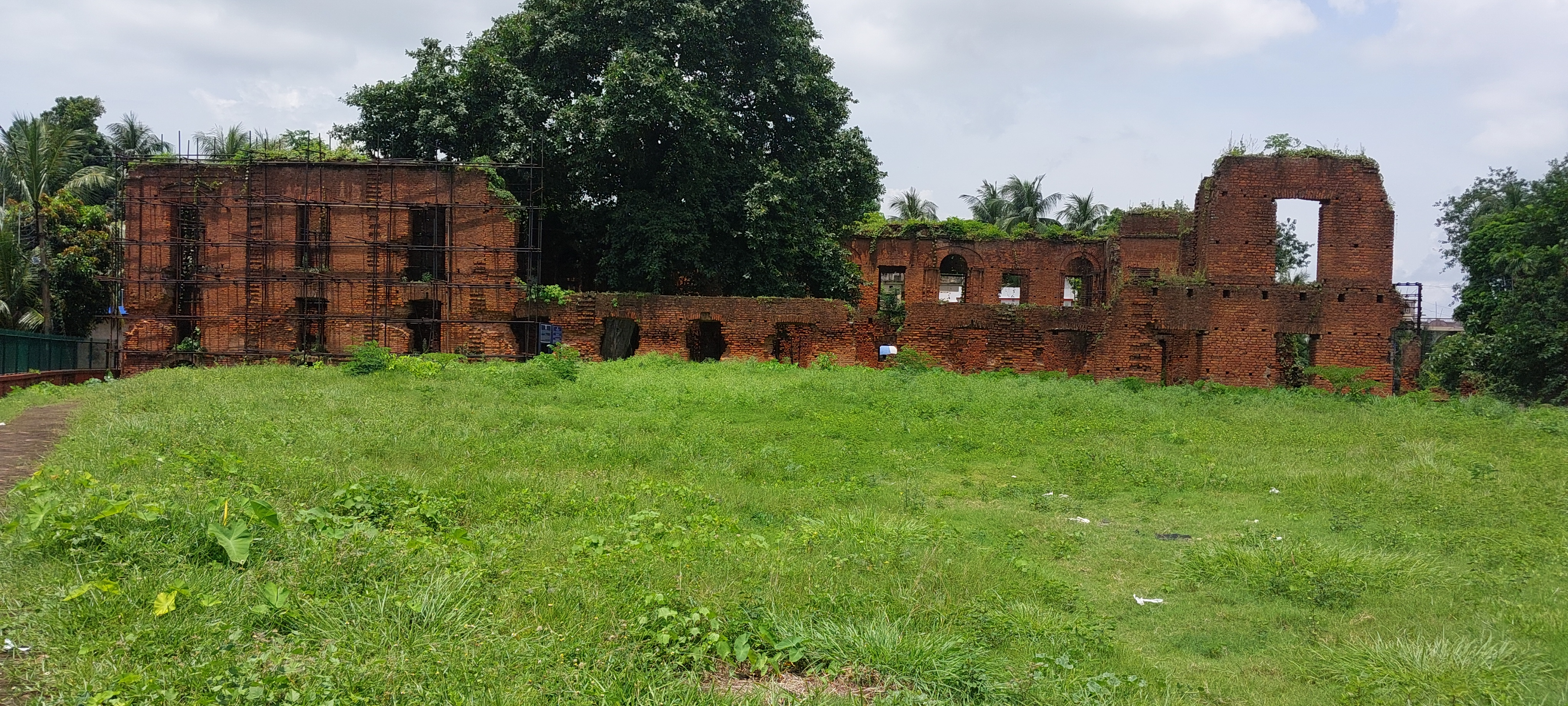
Parts of the Palace

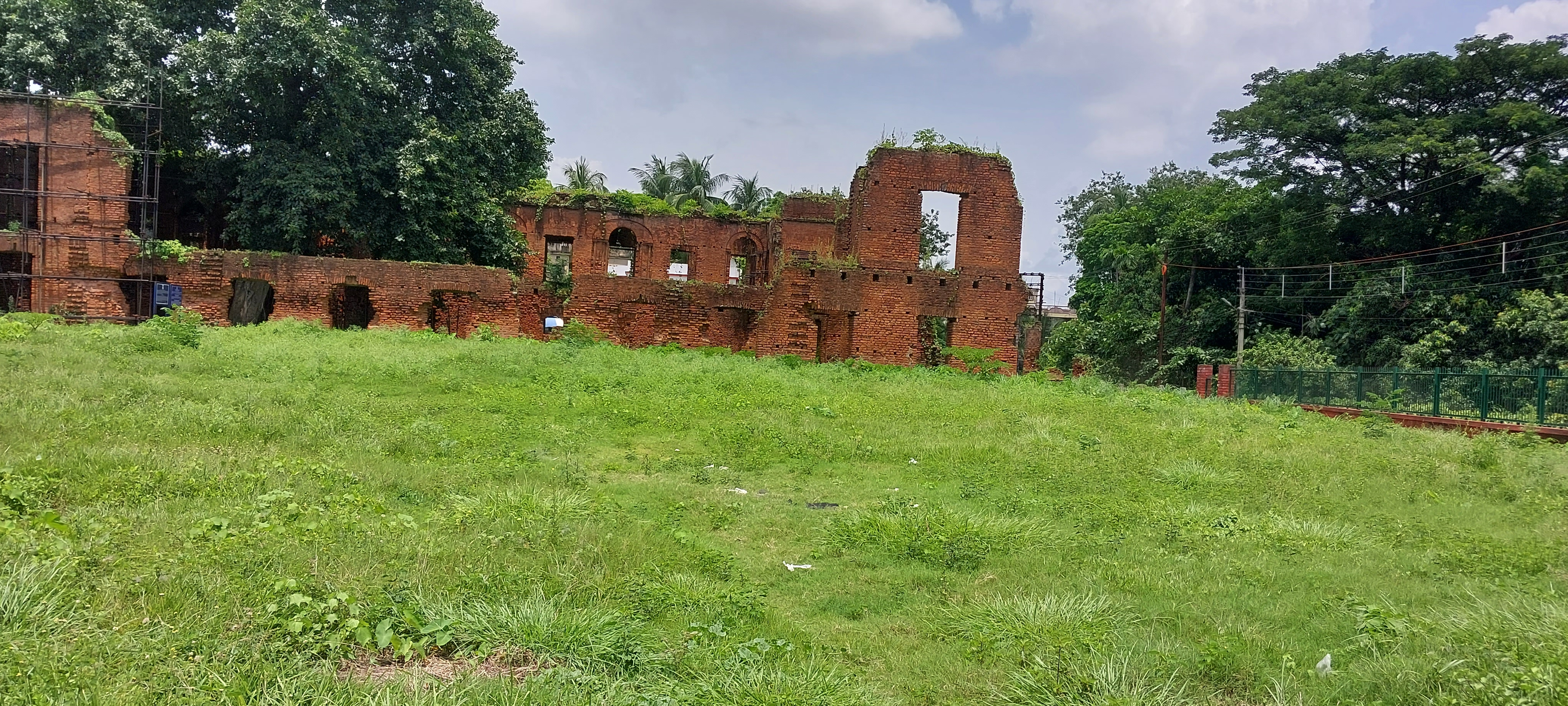
Parts of the Palace

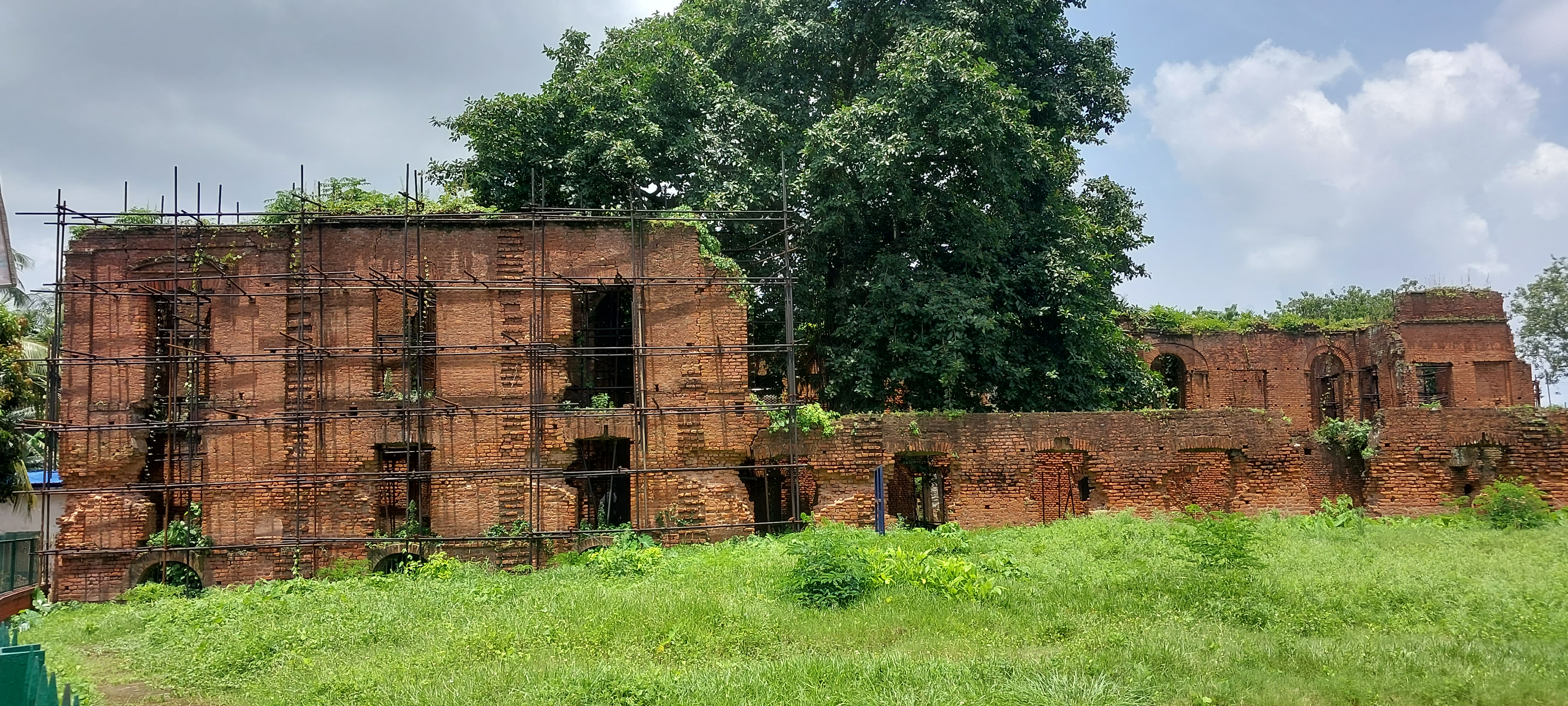
Parts of the Palace

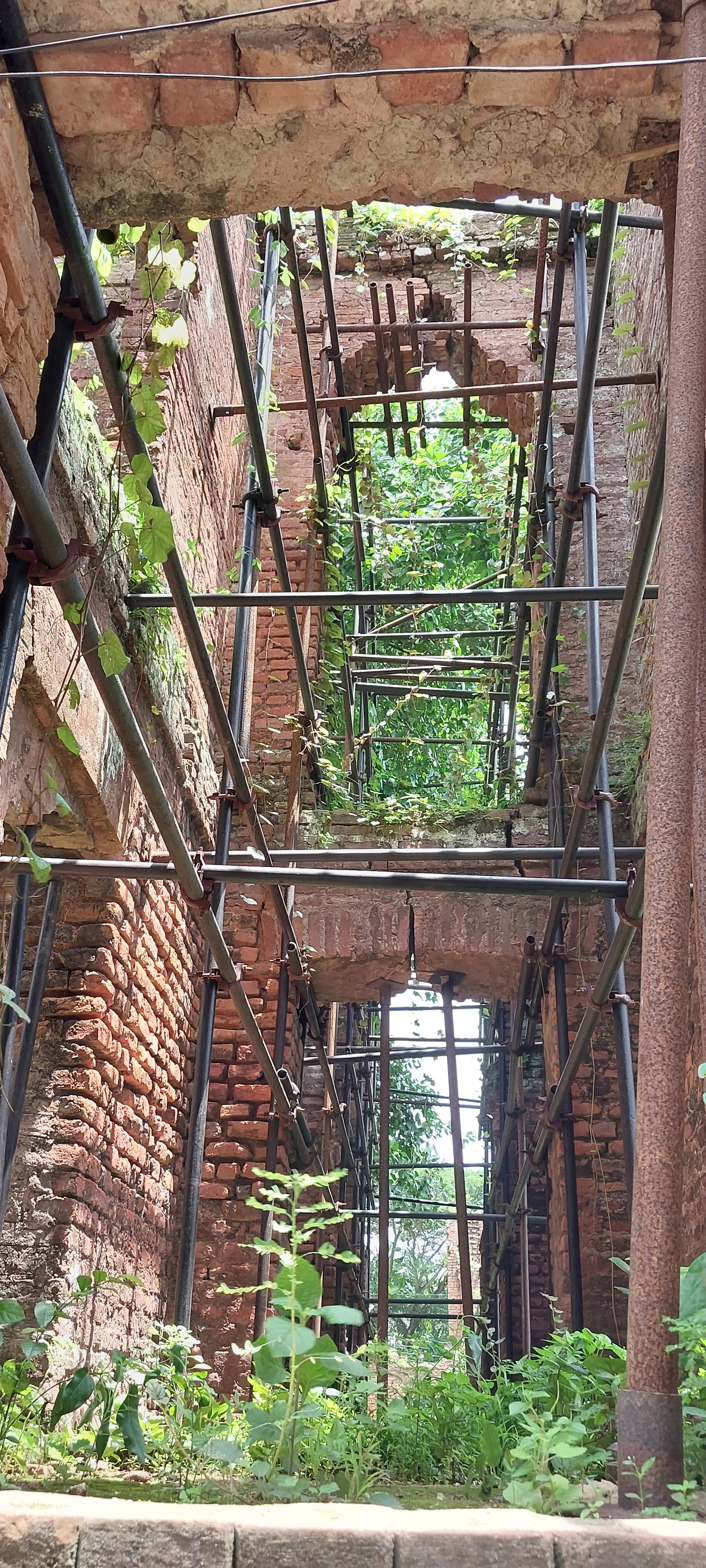
Restoration works

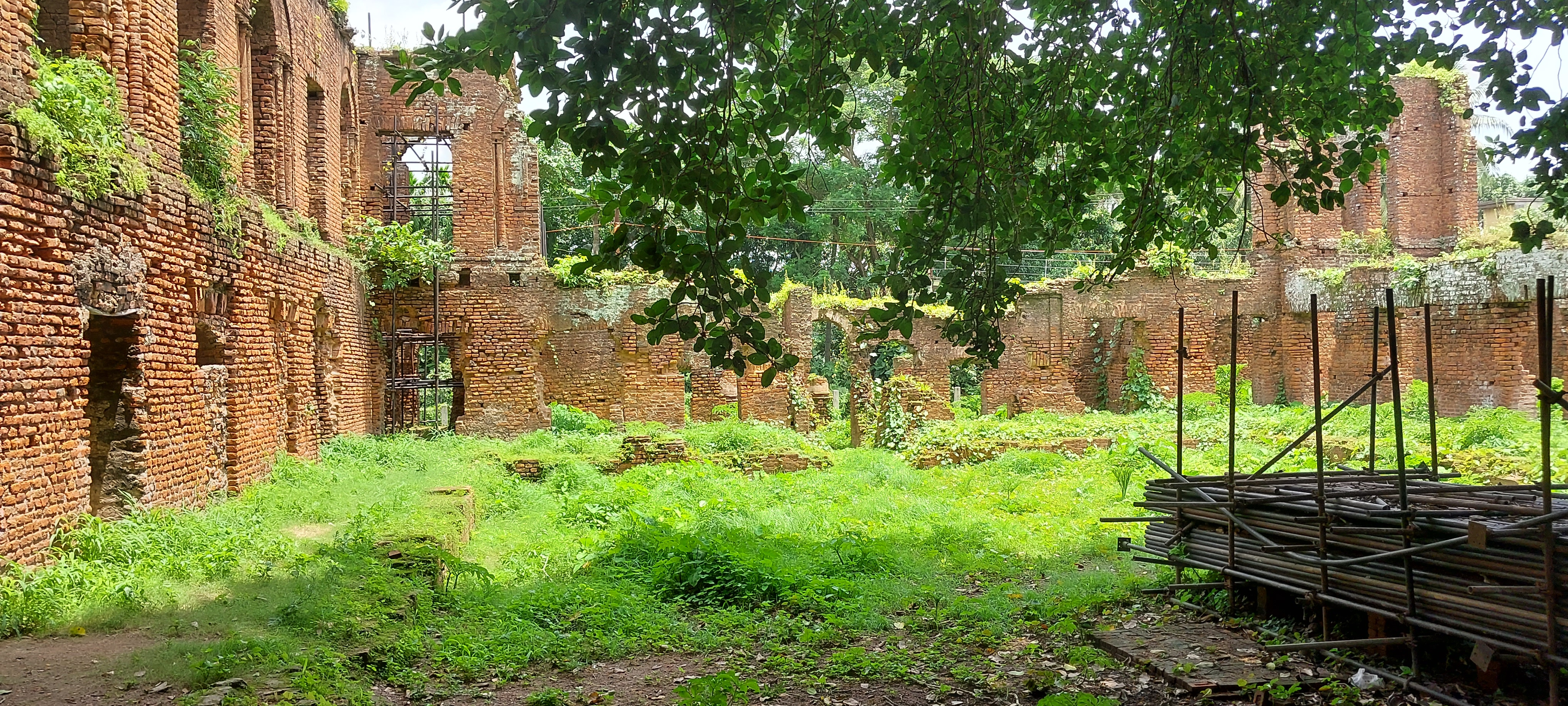
Courtyard of the Palace

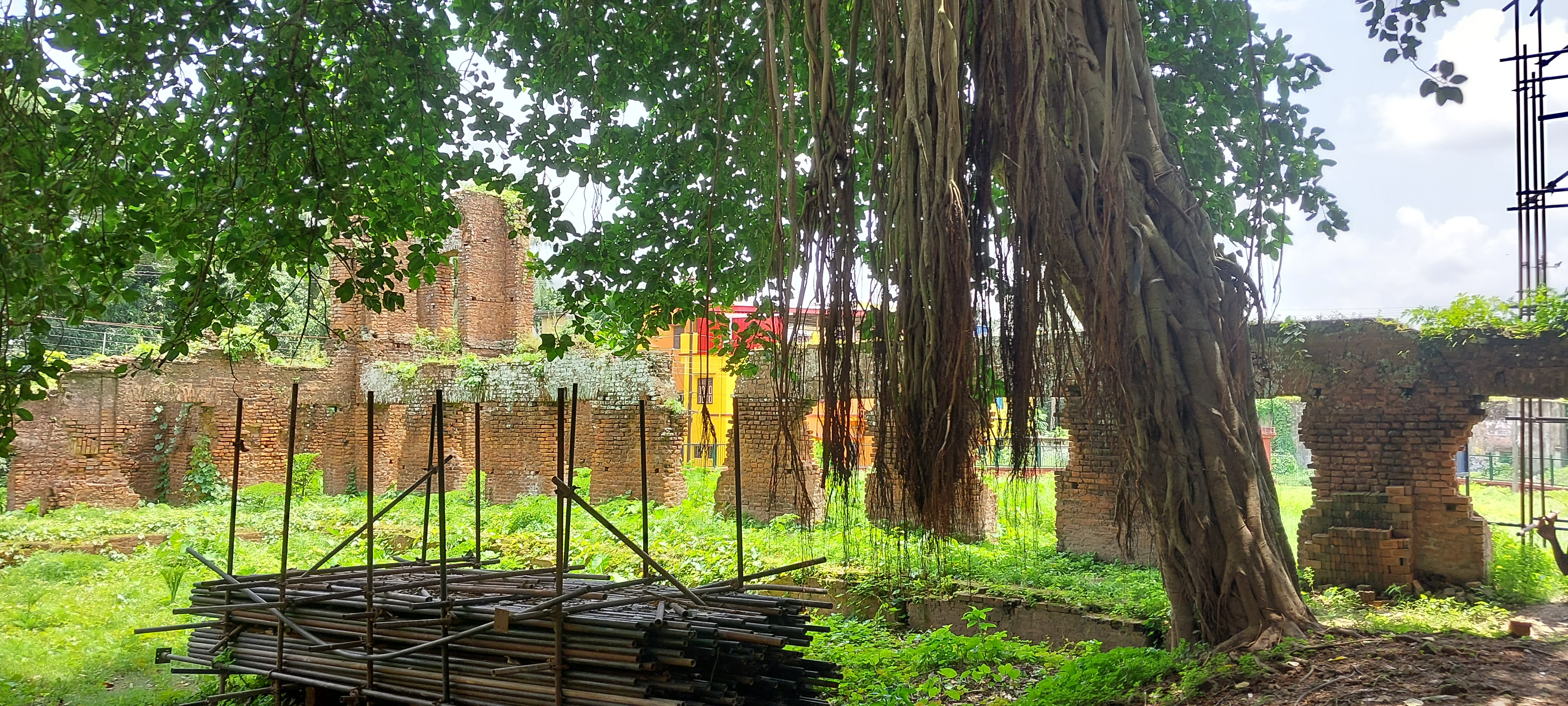
Courtyard from another angle

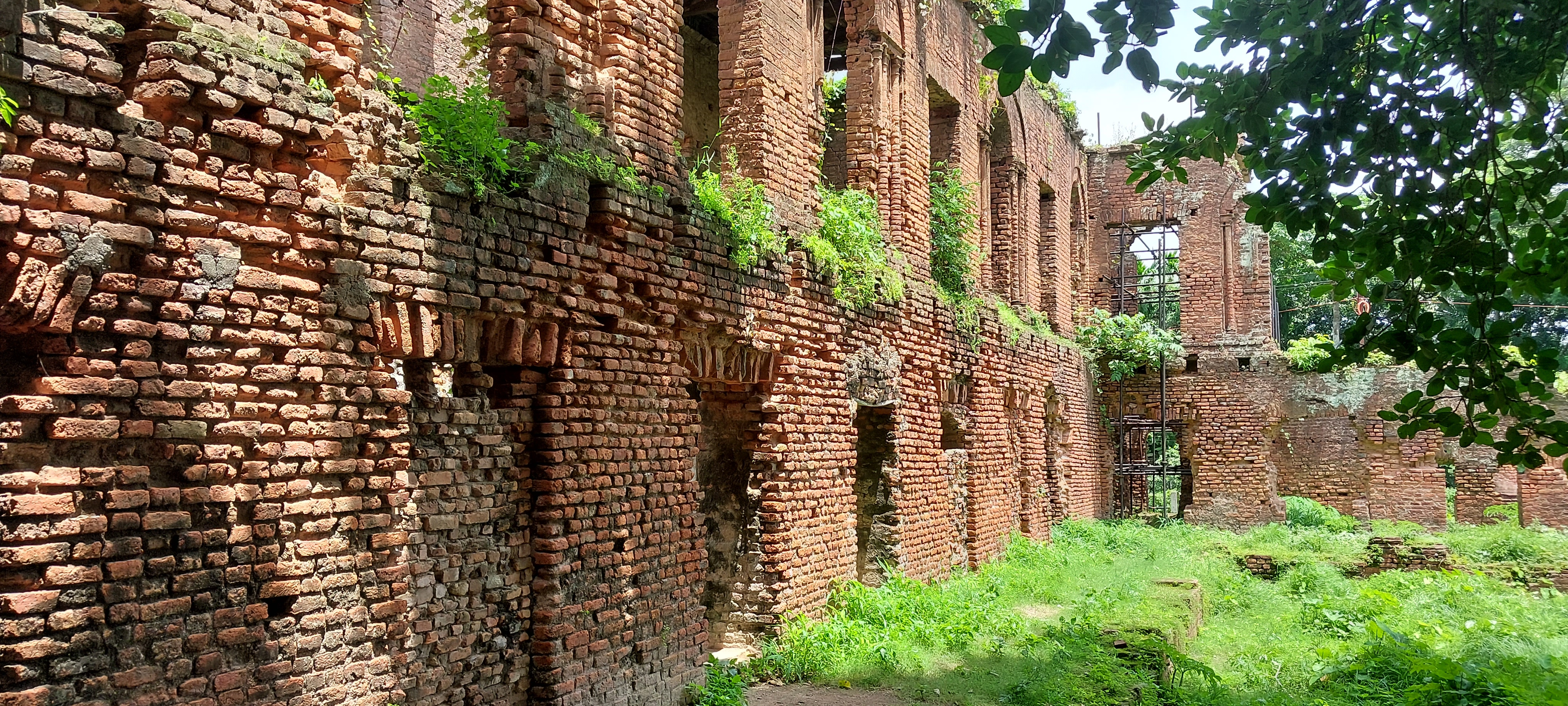
Walls of the fort

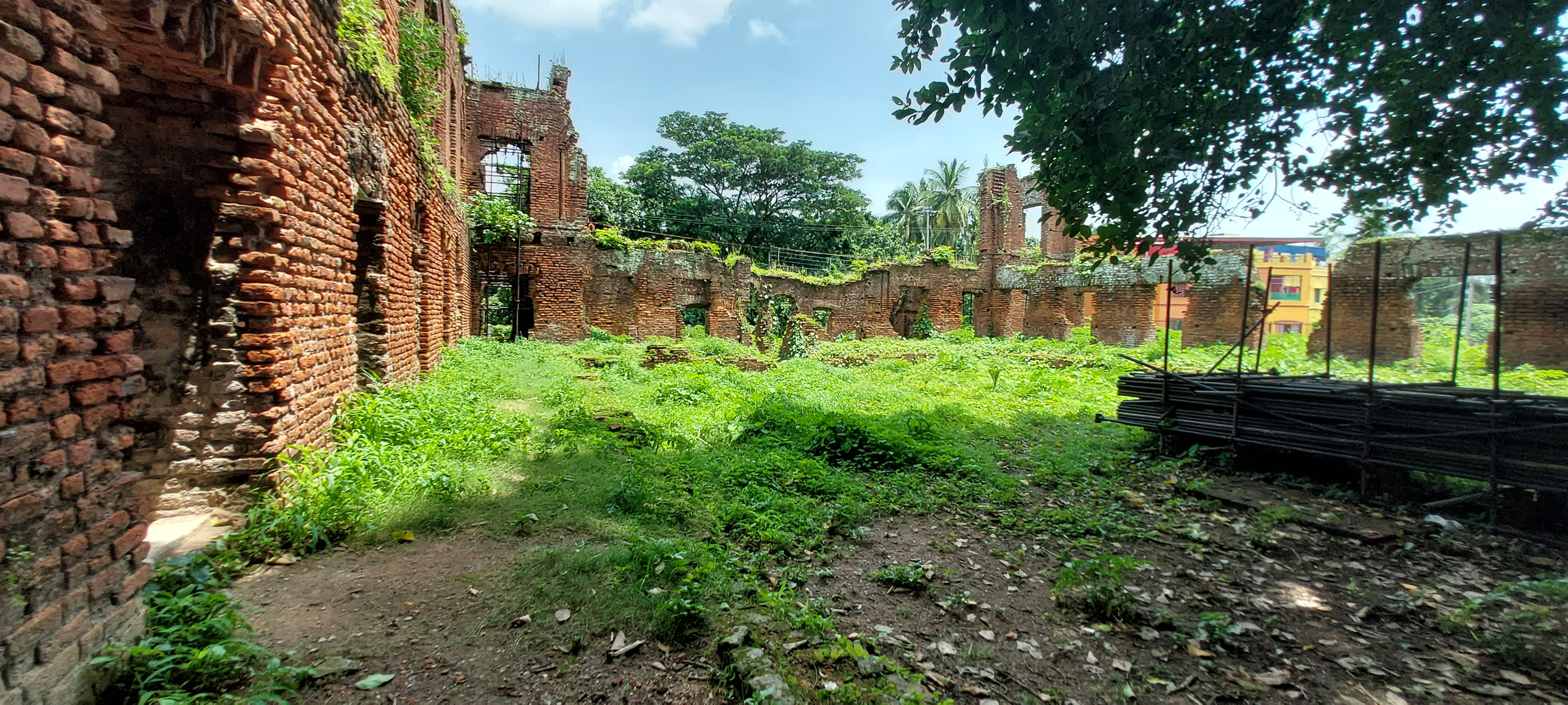
Courtyard

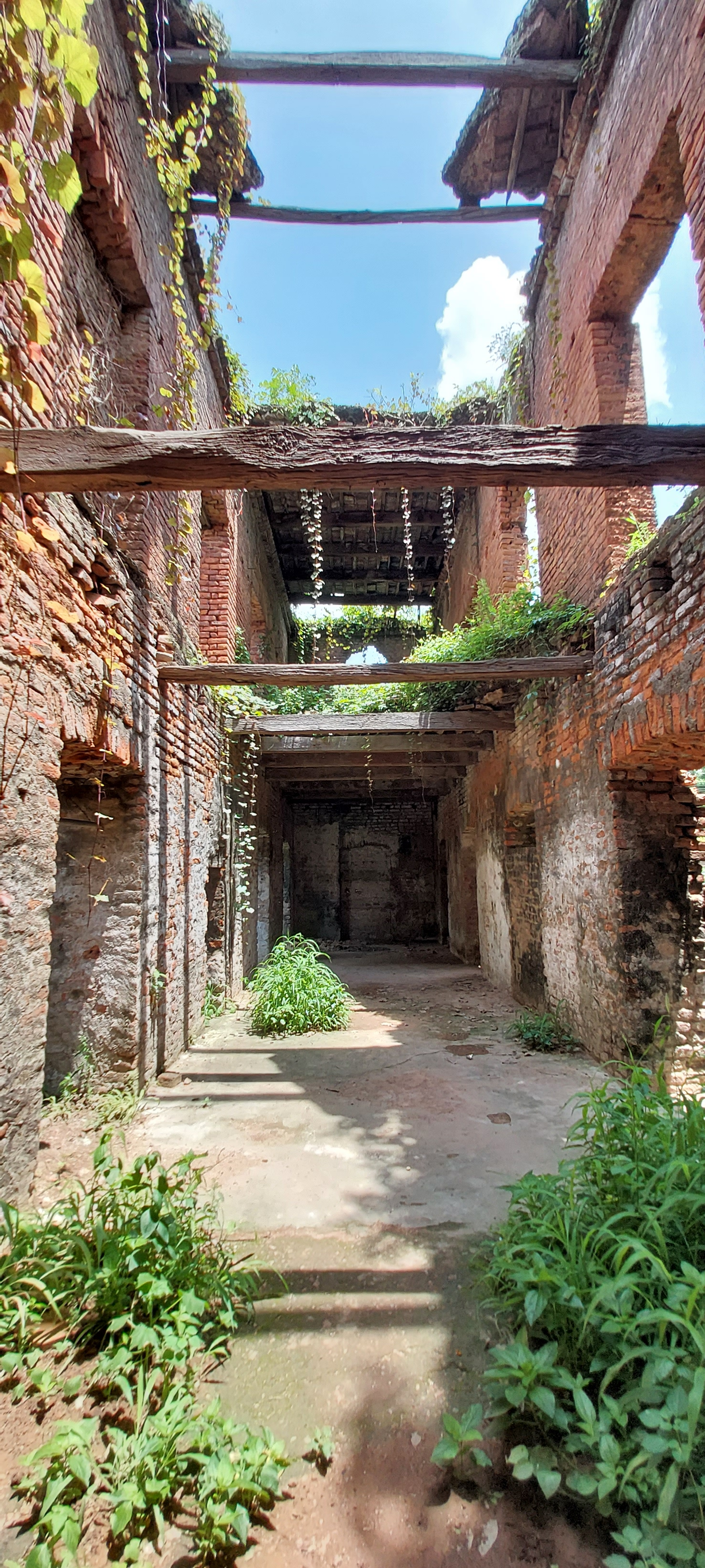
Restoration works between the columns

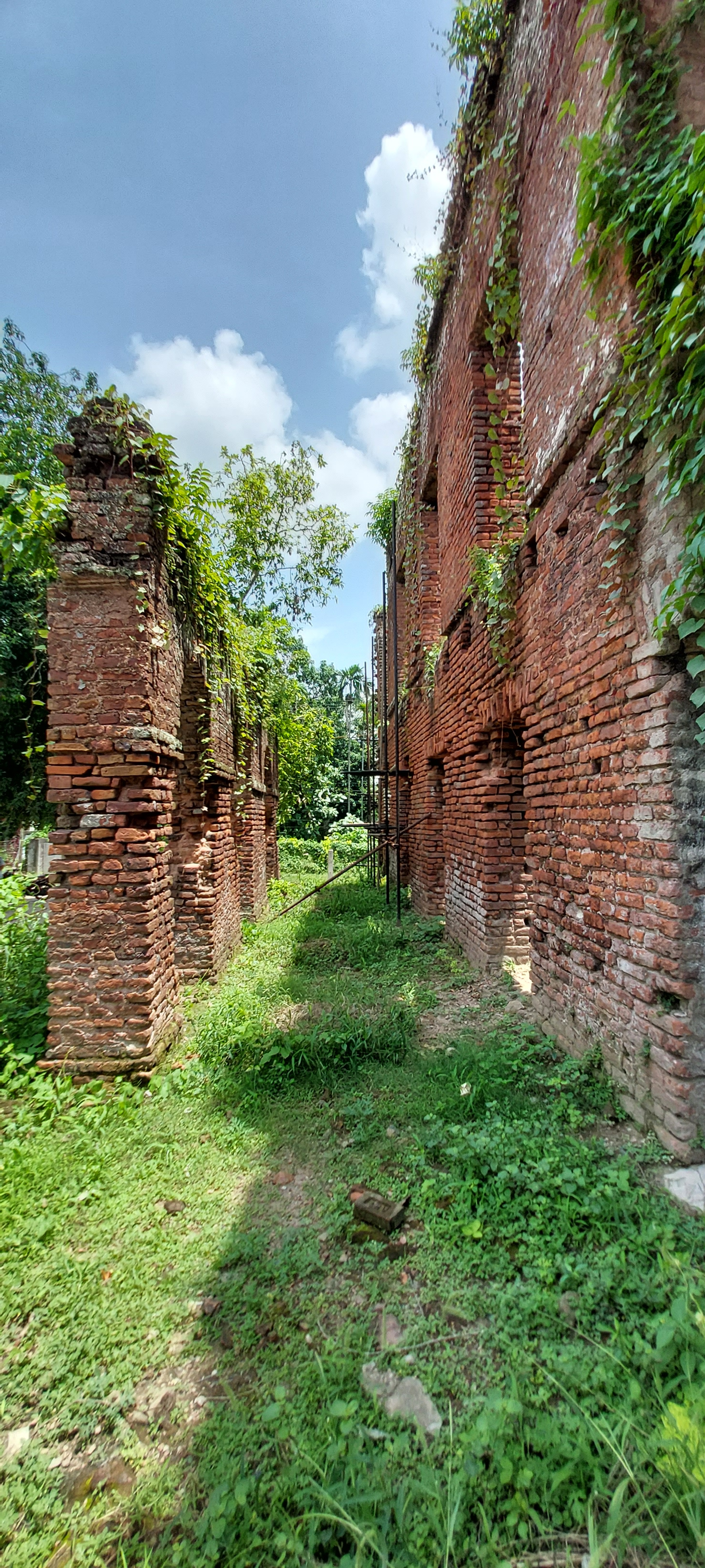
Ruins

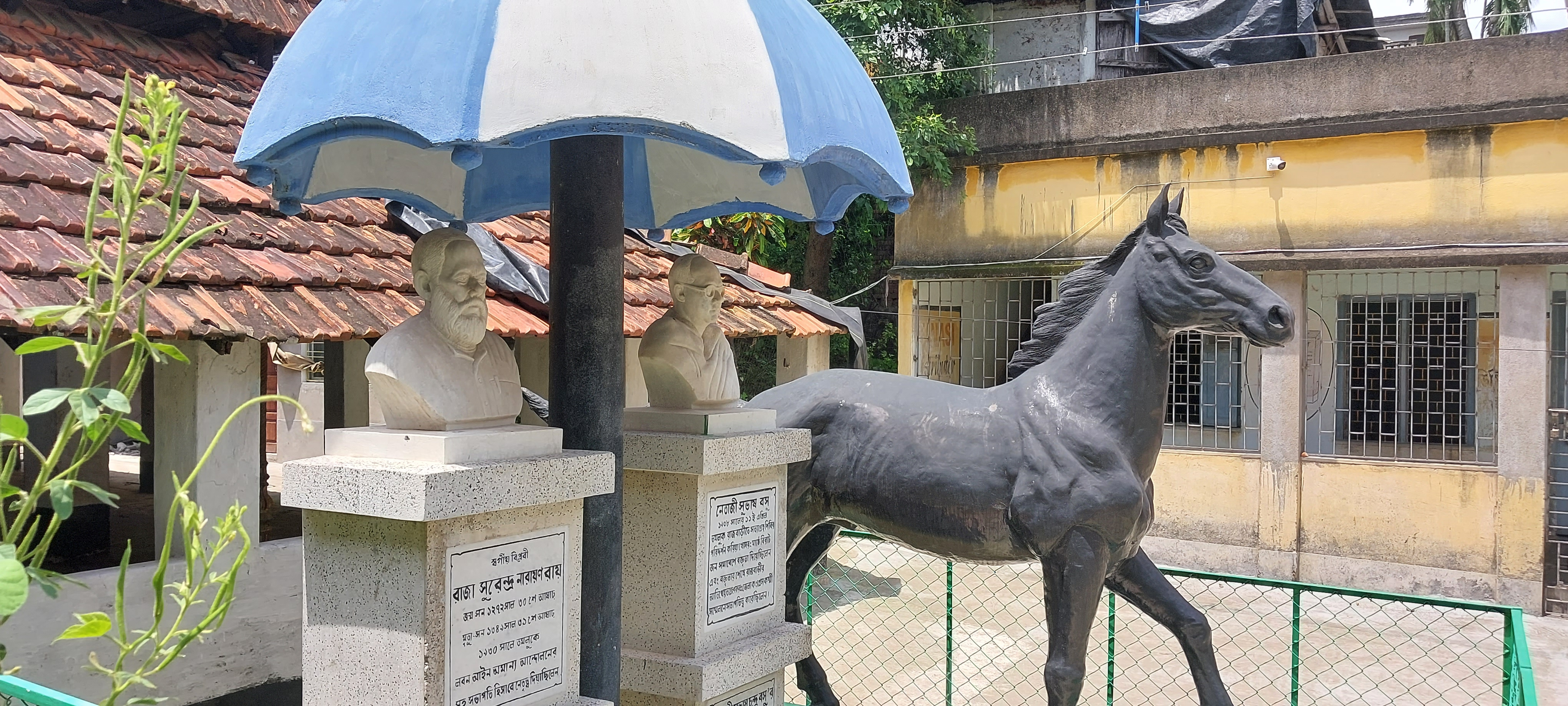
Bust of the members of the Royal Family

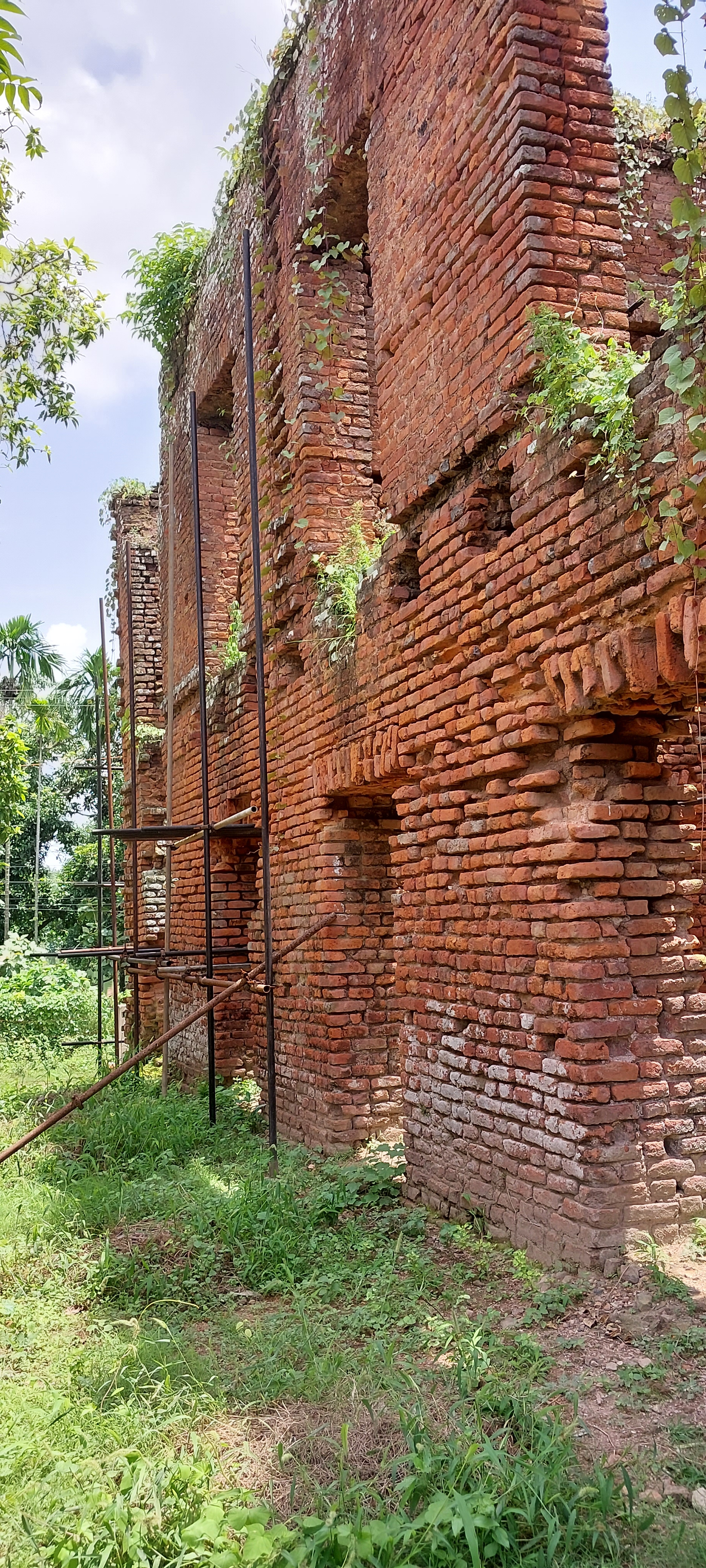
Restoration works on the walls

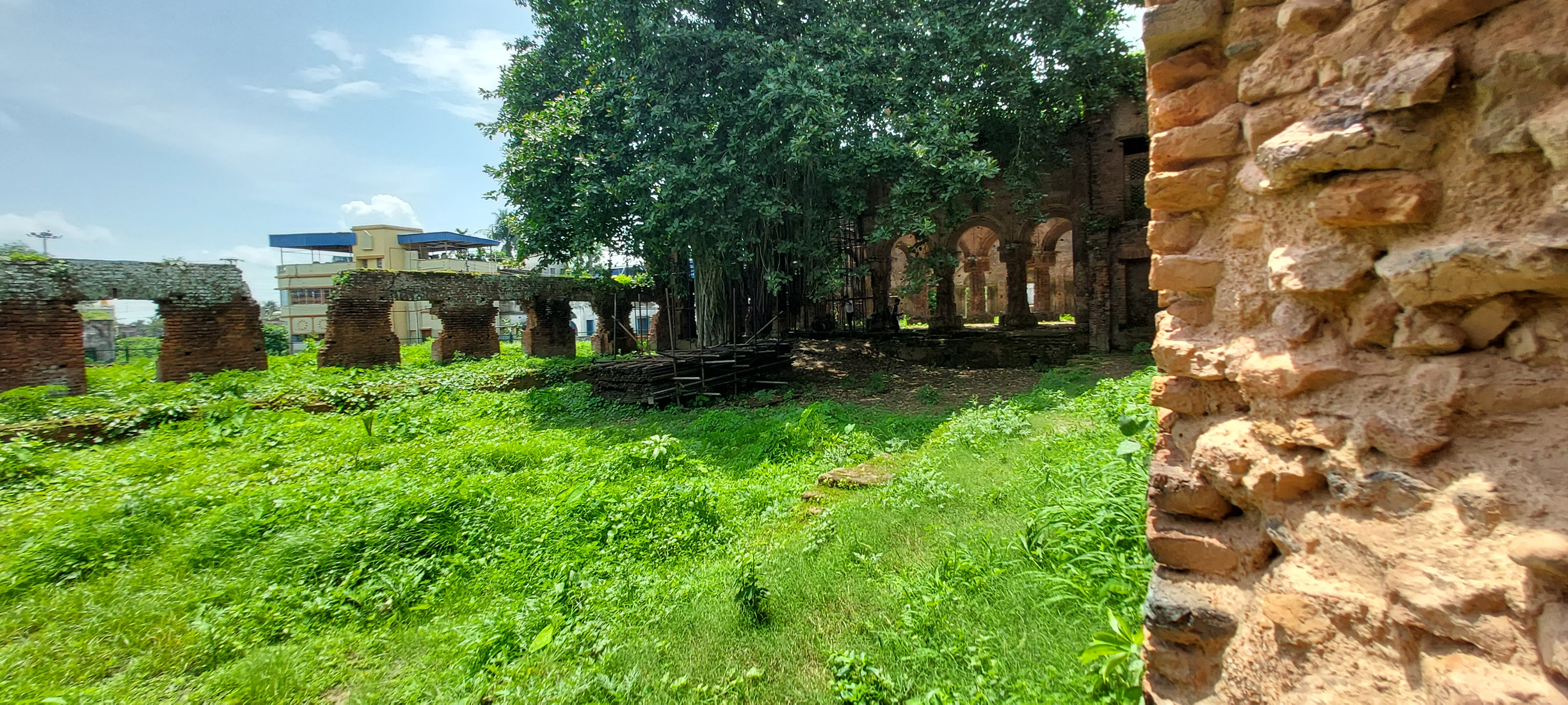
Backyards of the fort

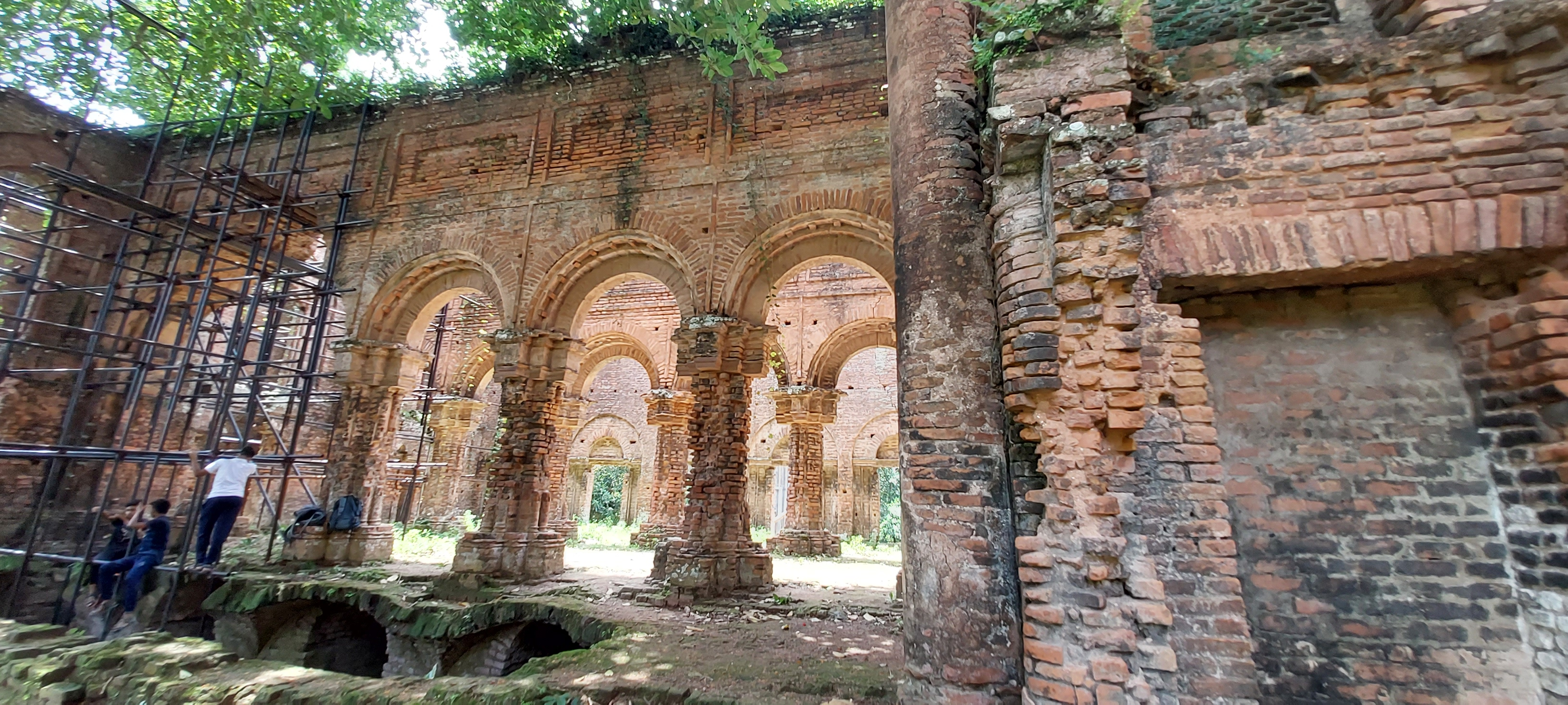
Corinthian Pillars

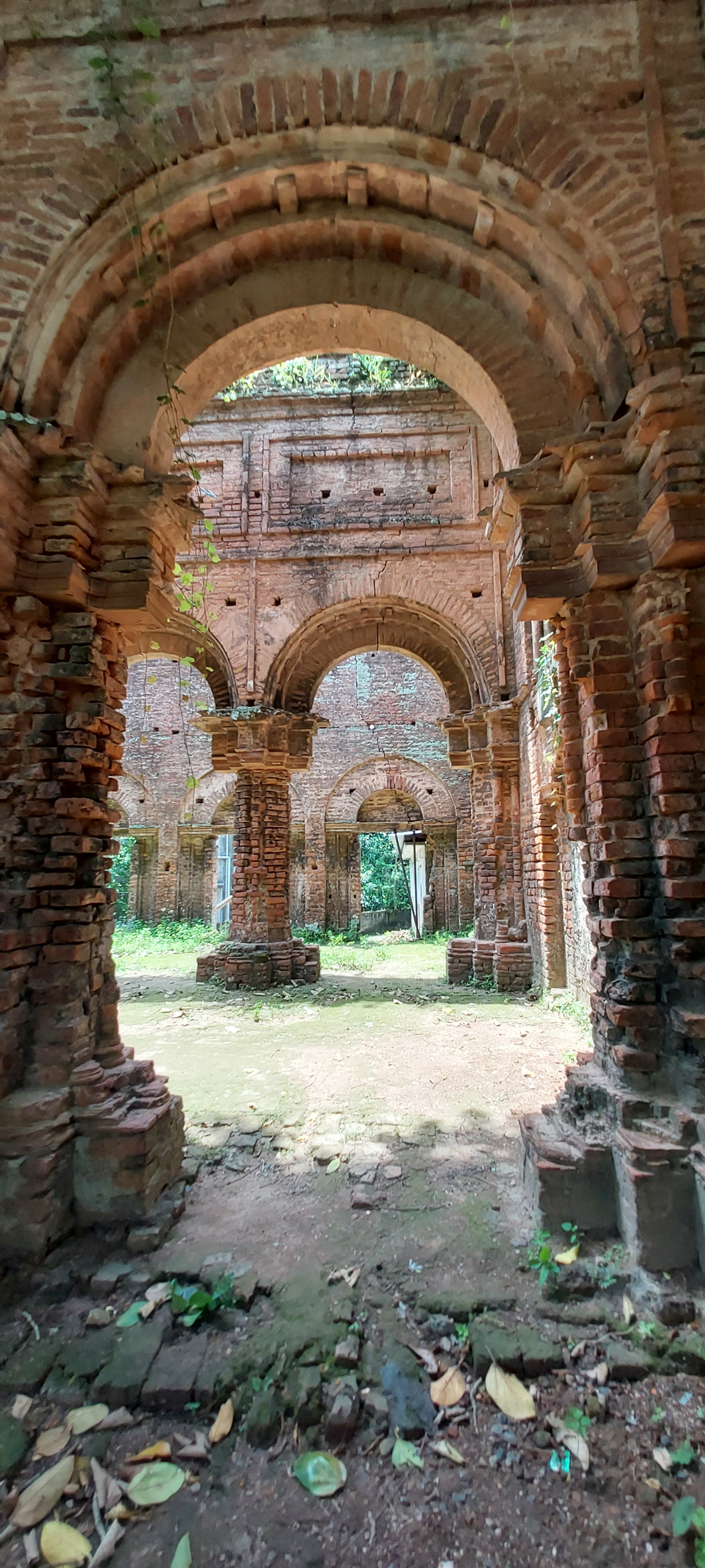
Arches

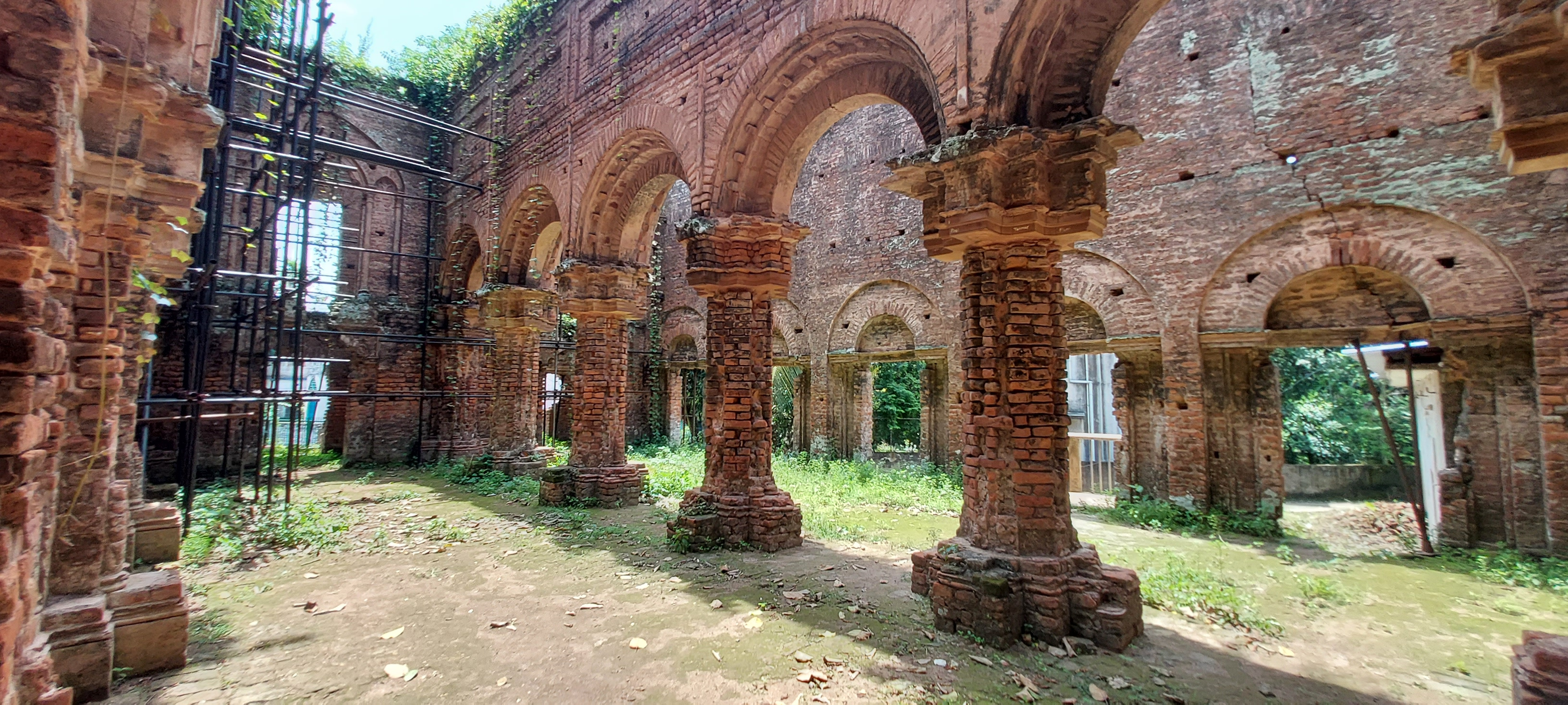
Ruined Durbar

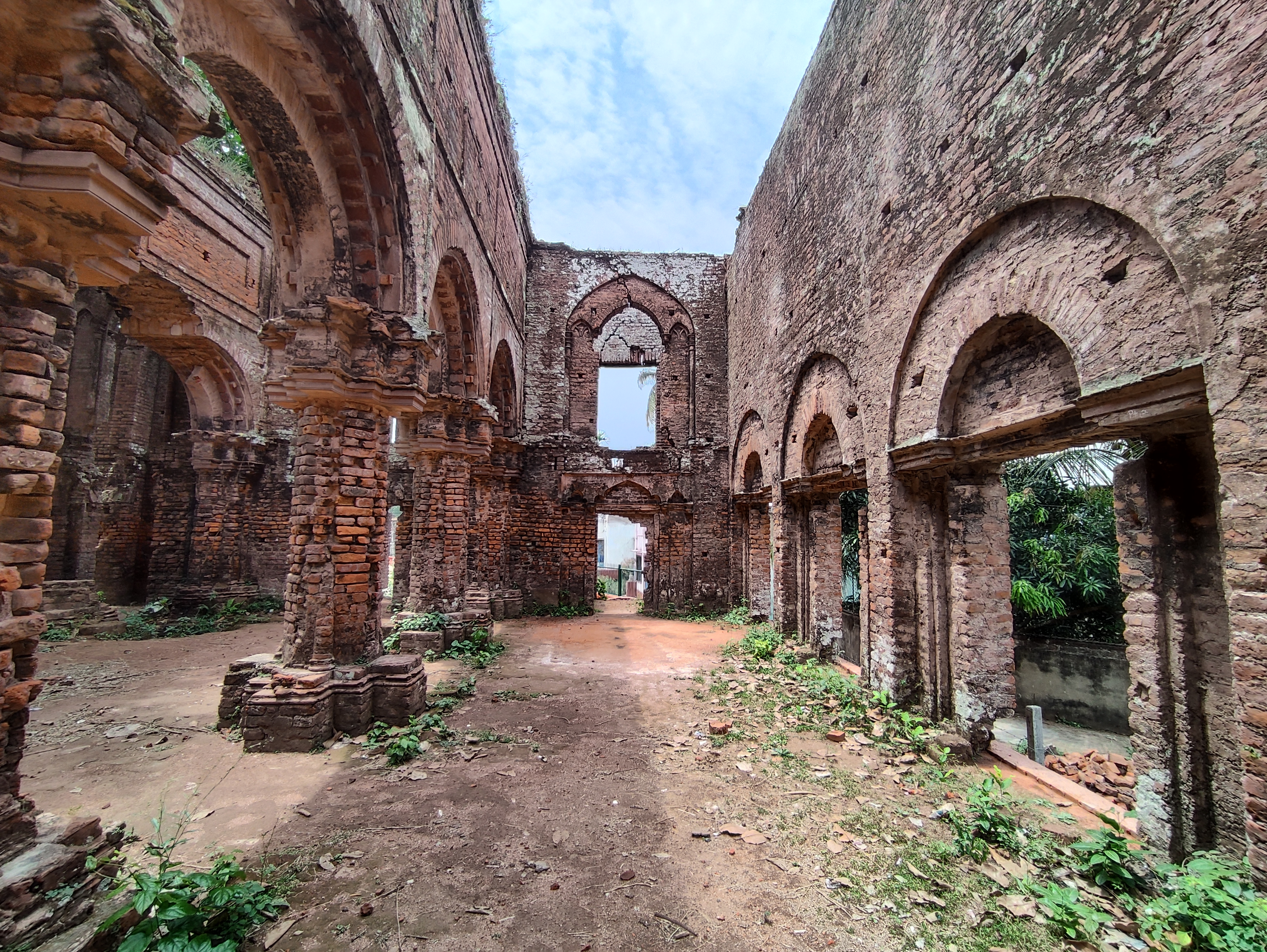
Inner corridor

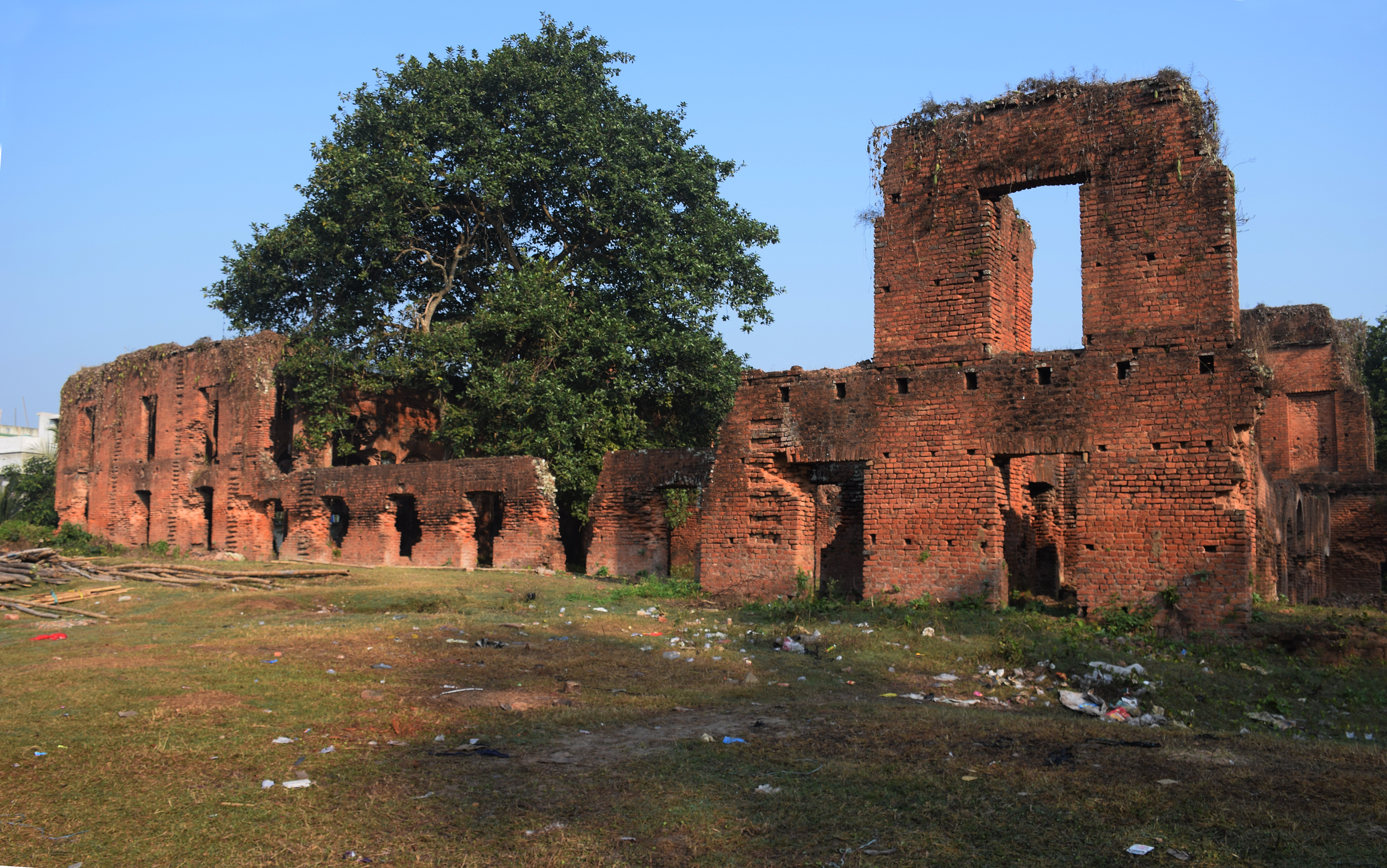
View from the outside

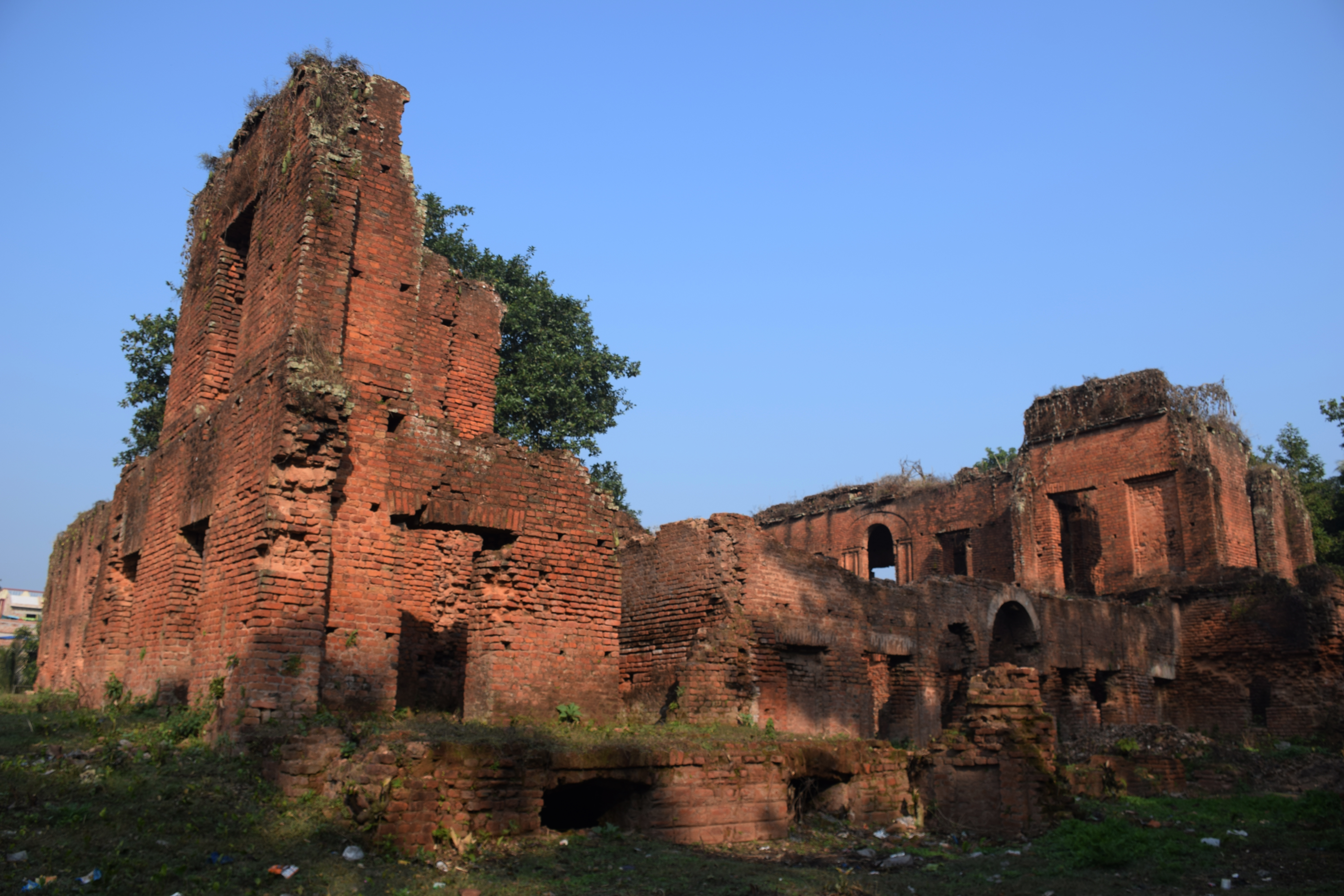
Ruined mounds

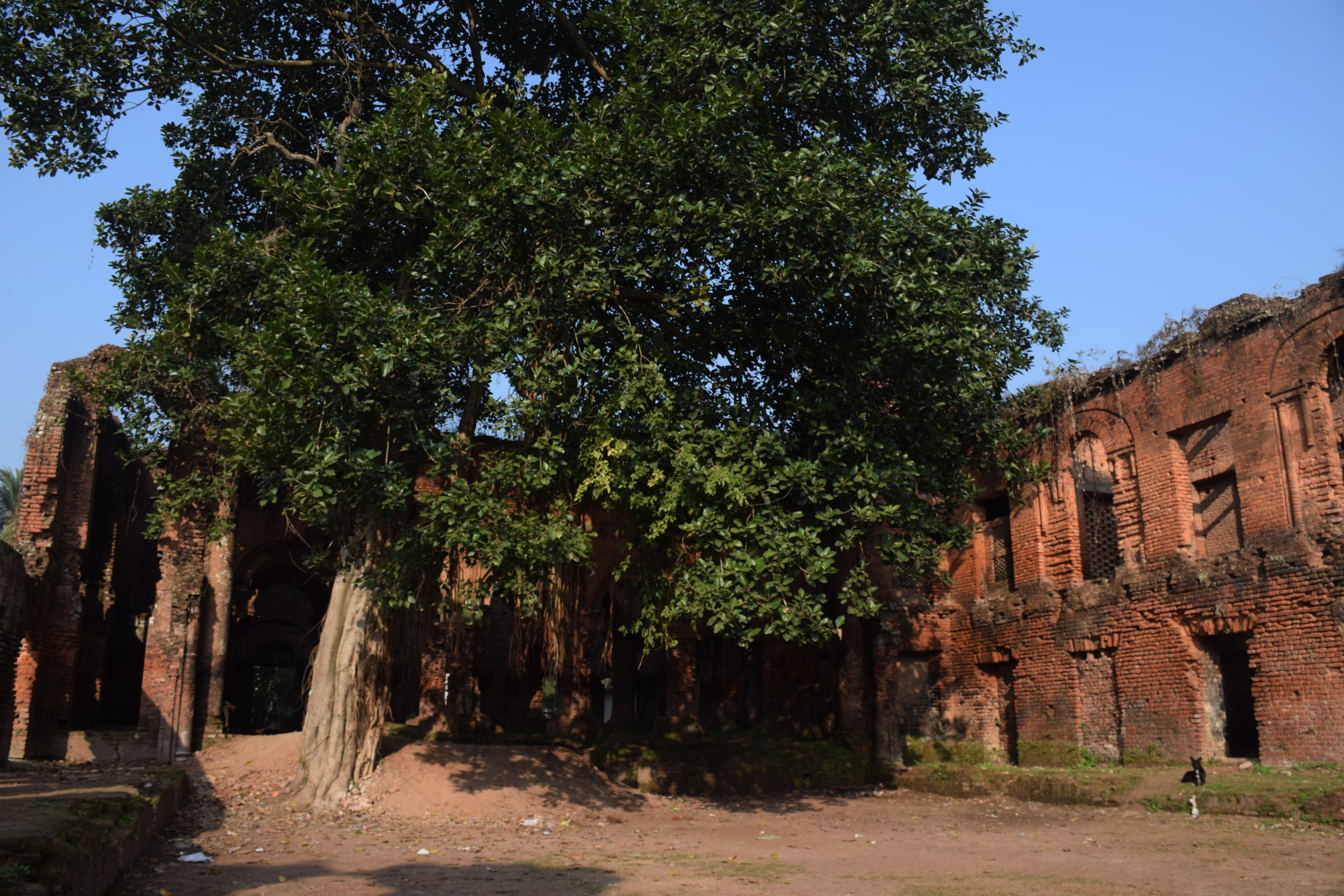
Old Banyan tree in the compound

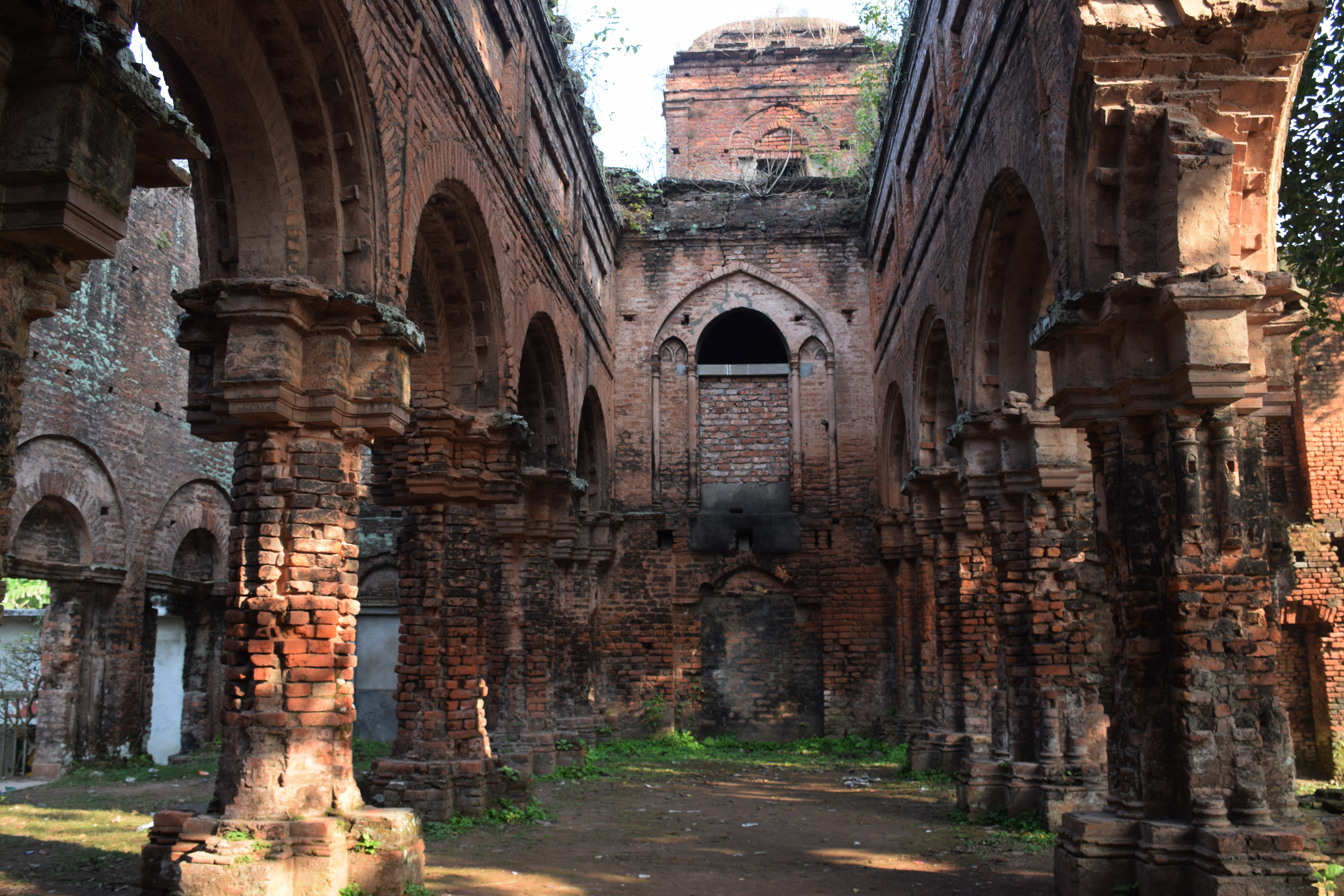
Central view

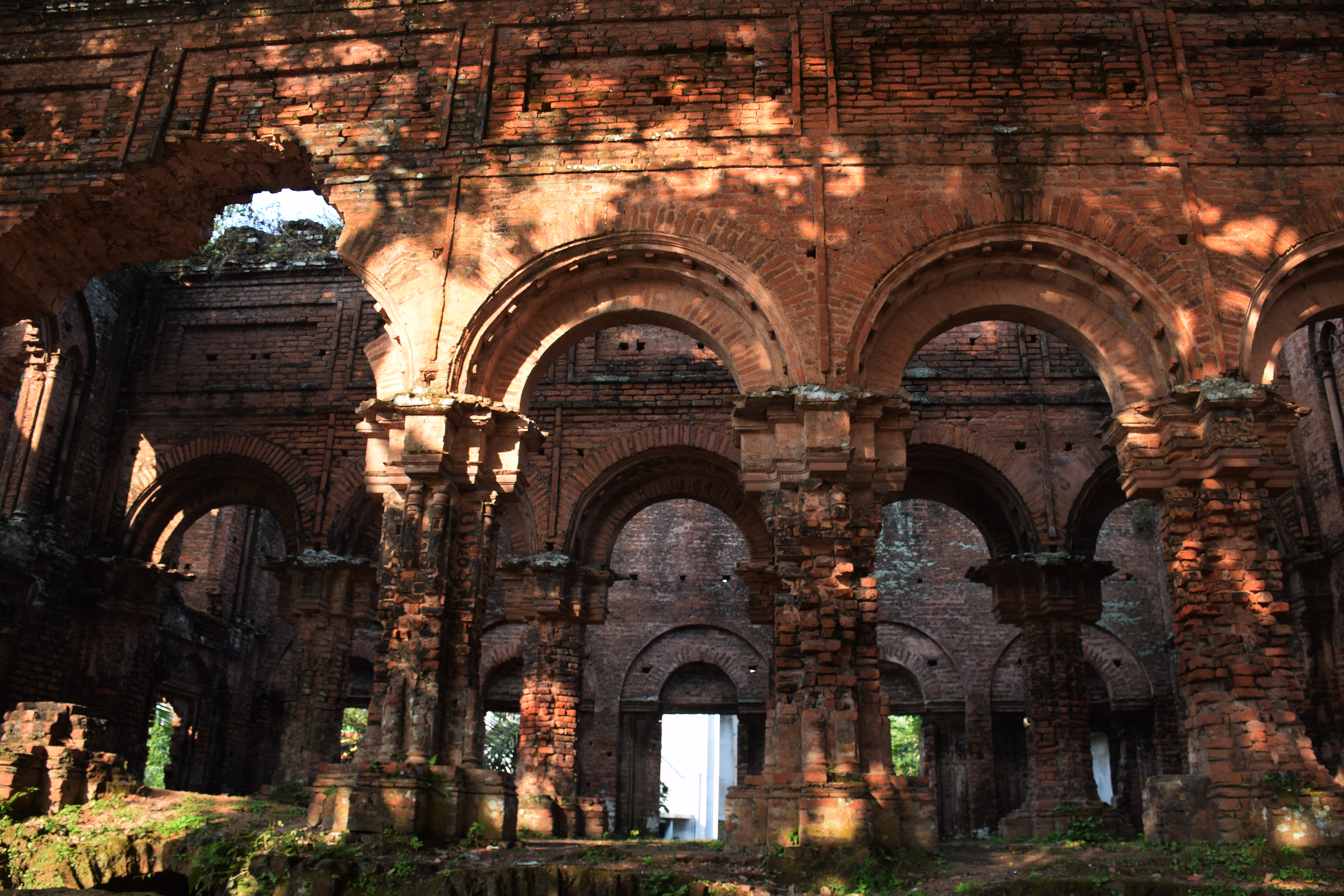
Roman arches

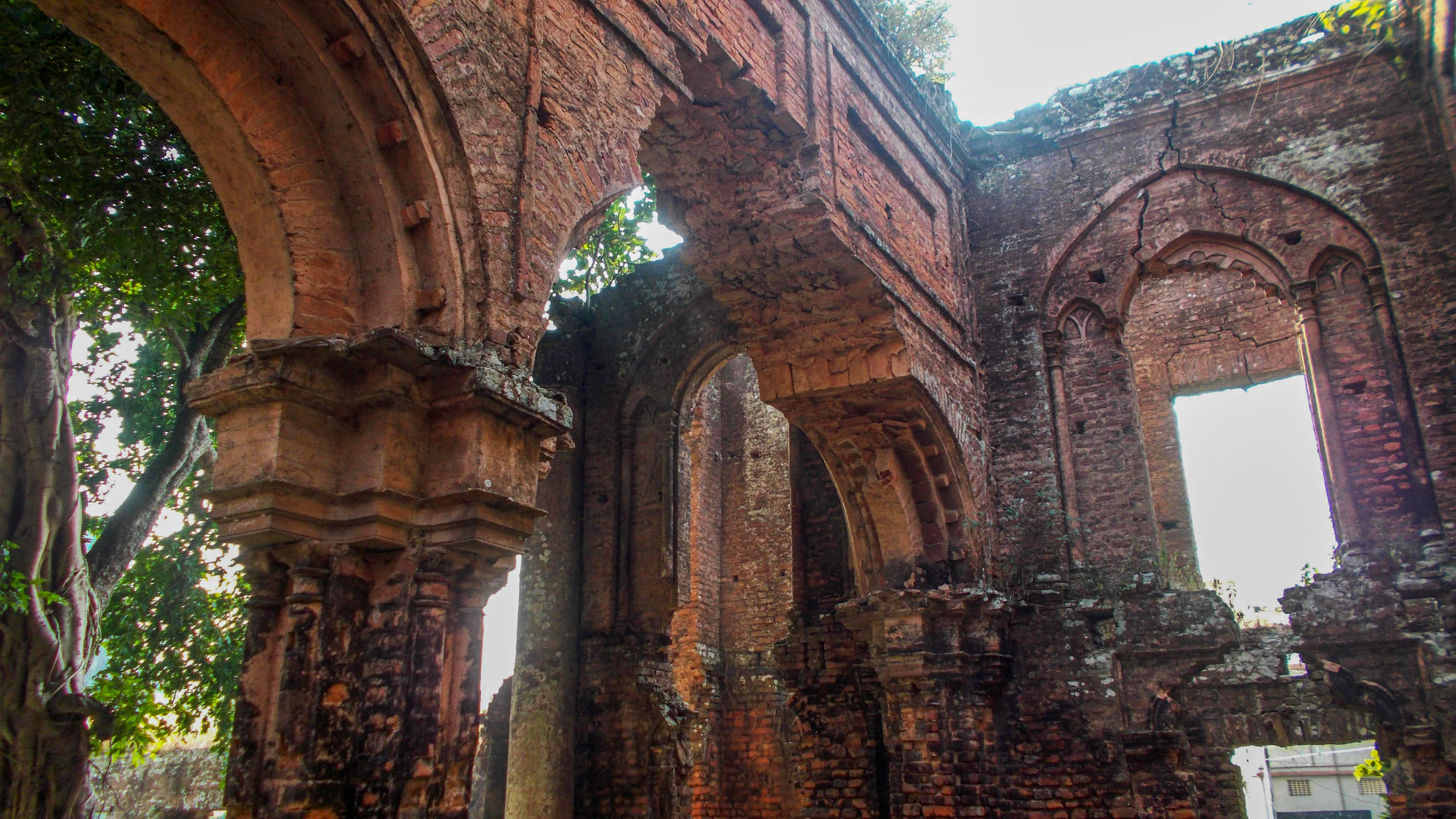
Example of Indo-Saracenic architecture

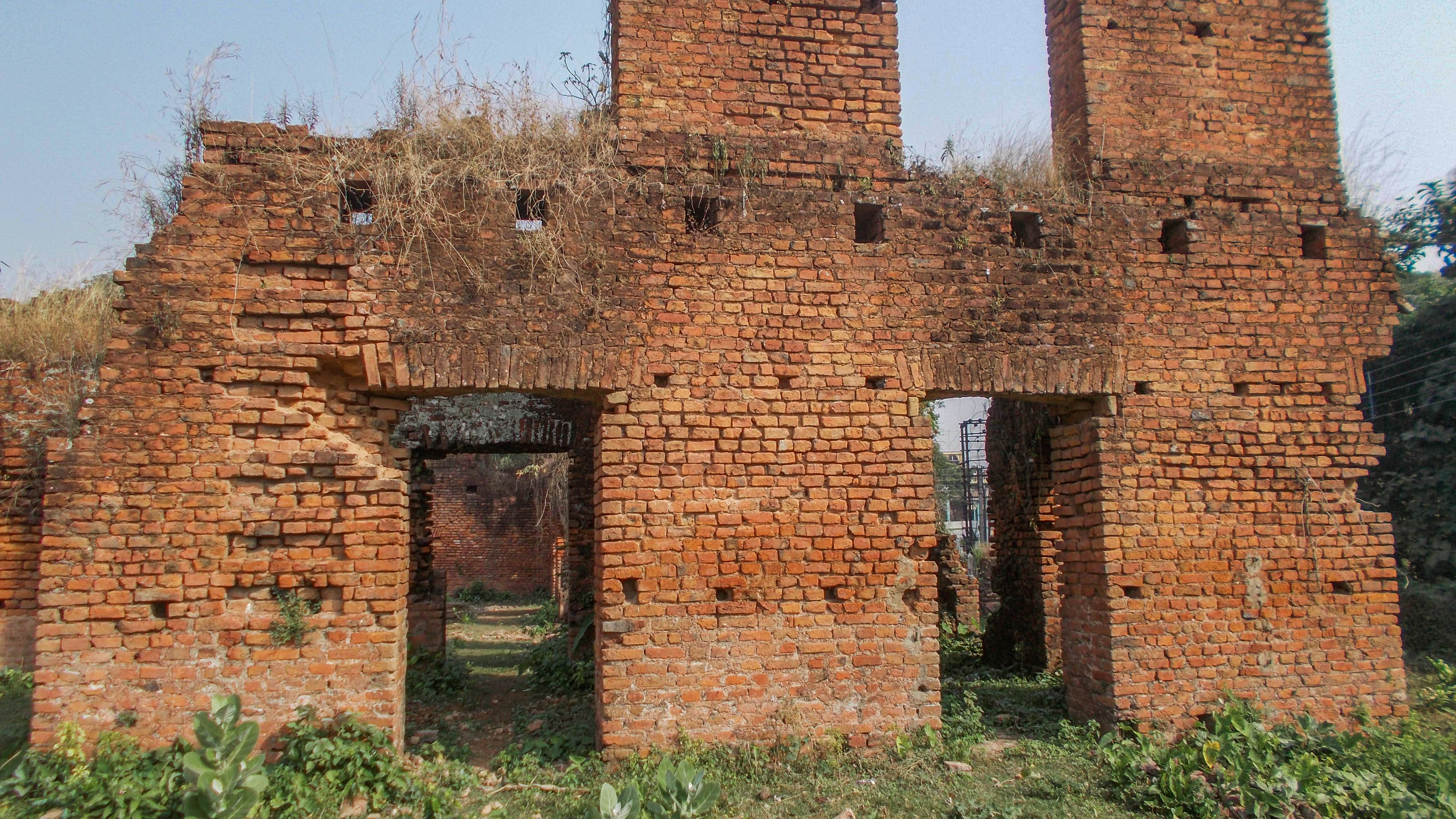
Ruins

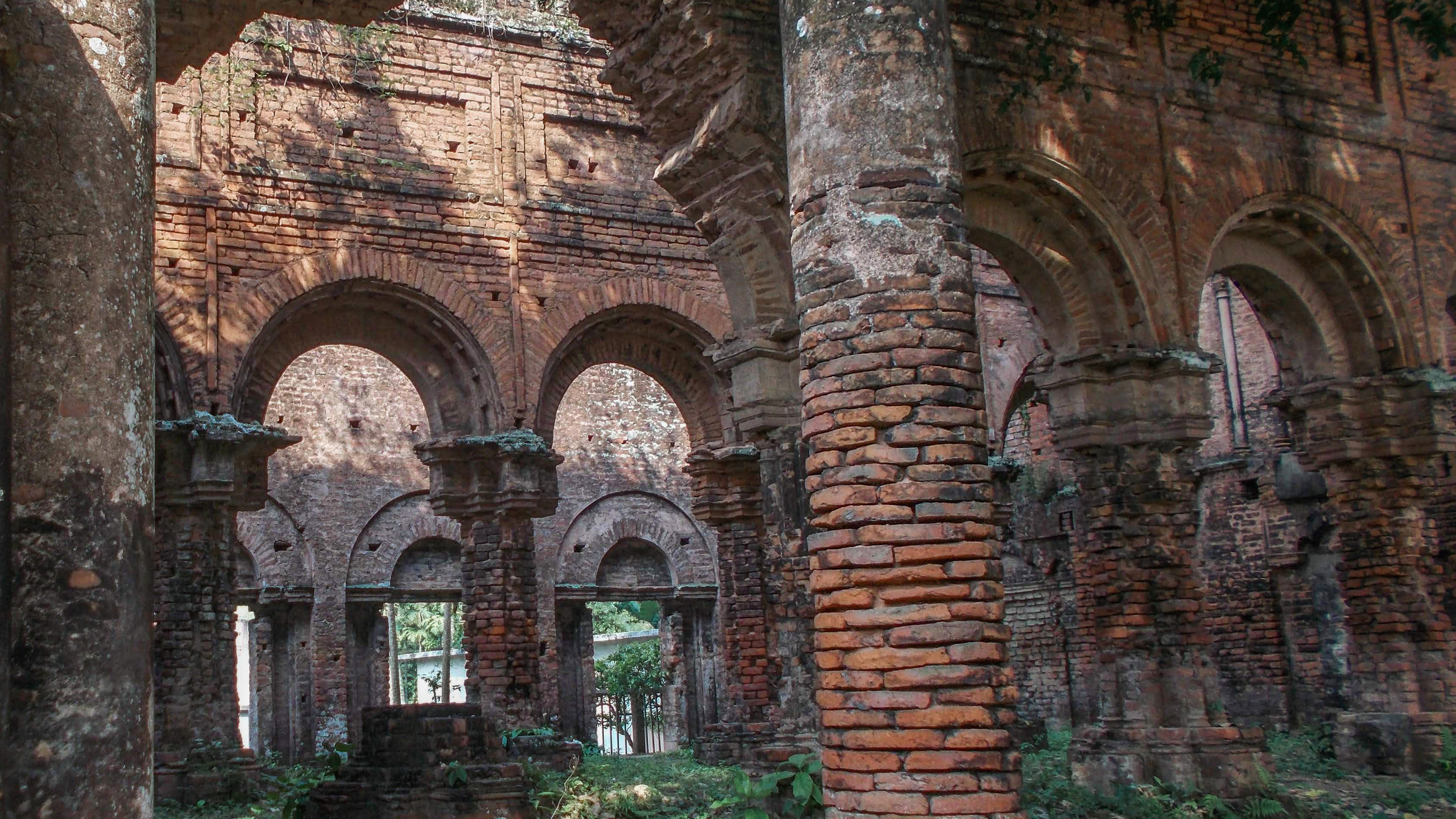
Column

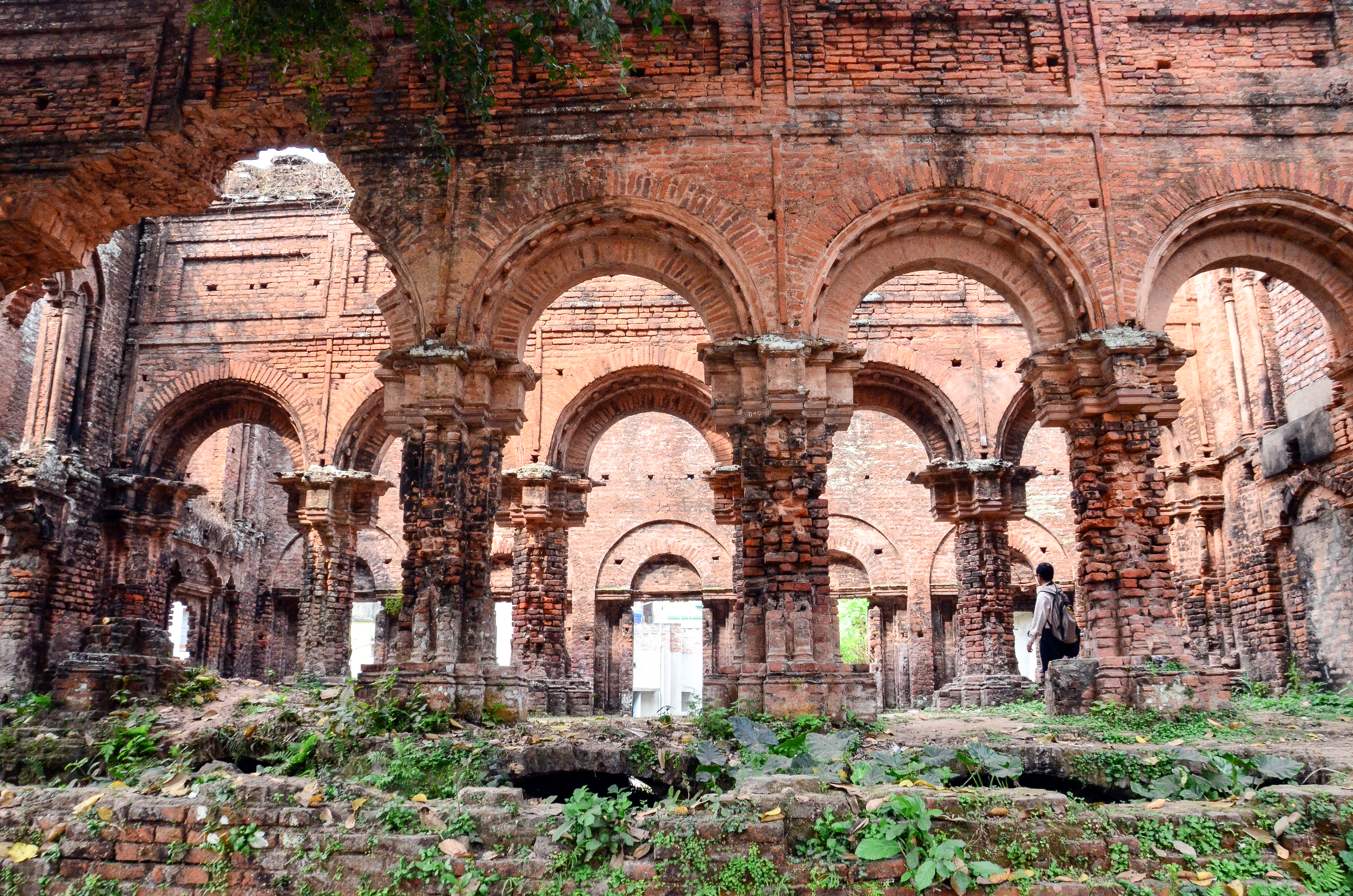
Pillars

== See also ==
- Vanga kingdom
- Pundravardhana
- Samatata
- Maritime history of Bengal

== Sources ==
- Bhaumick, Manoranjan (2001). History, Culture, and Antiquities of Tāmralipta. Punthi Pustak. ISBN 978-81-86791-27-1.
- Ramachandran, T. N. (1951). "Tāmraliptī (Taṁluk)". Artibus Asiae. 14 (3): 226–239. doi:10.2307/3248590. ISSN 0004-3648. JSTOR 3248590.
- Duraiswamy, Dayalan (1 January 2019). "ANCIENT SEAPORTS ON THE EASTERN COAST OF INDIA: THE HUB OF THE MARITIME SILK ROUTE NETWORK". Acta Via Serica.
