= Paharia Express =

Train in India

Overview
- Service type: Express
- Locale: West Bengal & Bihar
- First service: 5 October 2009; 17 years ago
- Current operator: North East Frontier Railway

Route
- Termini: New Jalpaiguri (NJP); Digha (DGHA)
- Stops: 15
- Distance travelled: 779 km (484 mi)
- Average journey time: 16 hours 15 minutes
- Service frequency: Weekly
- Train number: 15721 / 15722

On-board services
- Classes: AC 2 Tier, AC 3 Tier, Sleeper Class, General Unreserved
- Seating arrangements: Yes
- Sleeping arrangements: Yes
- Catering facilities: E-catering
- Observation facilities: Large windows
- Baggage facilities: Available
- Other facilities: Below the seats

Technical
- Rolling stock: LHB coach (wef 26 Sep 2025)
- Track gauge: Broad Gauge
- Operating speed: 48 km/h (30 mph) average including halts.

The 15721 / 15722 Paharia Express is an express train connecting Indian cities Siliguri and Digha. This is the first direct train service originating from New Jalpaiguri (Siliguri) to Digha. This train connects North and South of West Bengal touching Bihar and West Bengal state capital Kolkata. This train runs on the Kolkata–Siliguri route via Nabadwip Dham Railway Station.

The meaning of word "Paharia" is The people of the hills.

This train was inaugurated by the then Railway Minister India and former Chief Minister of West Bengal, Mamata Banerjee on 5 October 2009.

== Accommodations ==
This train comprises 1 Composite [1A+3A], 1 AC 3-Tiers, 8 Sleeper class, 4 Unreserved General Compartment & 2 Luggage/Parcel cum Brake van which is provided with the Guard's cabin. Total coach composition is 16.

== Traction ==
The train is hauled by a Howrah Loco Shed-based WAP-4 electric locomotive from Digha to New Jalpaiguri and vice versa.

== Reverse ==
The train reverses at Howrah Junction

== Time table ==
- 15721 Digha–New Jalpaiguri Paharia Express (Saturday)

Station code	Halts	Arrival	Departure
DGHA	Digha Flag Station	--:--	16:30
KATI	Kanthi P Halt	16:59	17:00
TMZ	Tamluk Junction	18:30	18:35
MCA	Mecheda	19:22	19:23
BZN	Bagnan	19:39	19:40
ULB	Uluberia	19:54	19:55
SRC	Santragachi Junction	20:29	20:30
HWH	Howrah Junction	21:05	21:55
BDC	Bandel Junction	22:52	22:55
KWAE	Katwa Junction	00:33	00:35
AZ	Azimganj Junction	01:55	02:00
MLDT	Malda Town	04:00	04:10
BOE	Barsoi Junction	05:58	06:00
KNE	Kishanganj	06:50	06:52
BORA	Bagdogra	07:45	07:47
NJP	New Jalpaiguri	08:15	--:--

- 15722 New Jalpaiguri–Digha Paharia Express (Friday)

Station Code	Halts	Arrival	Departure
NJP	New Jalpaiguri	--:--	21:15
BORA	Bagdogra	21:41	21:43
KNE	Kishanganj	22:21	22:23
BOE	Barsoi Junction	23:06	23:08
MLDT	Malda Town	00:55	01:05
AZ	Azimganj Junction	02:55	03:00
KWAE	Katwa Junction	04:13	04:15
BDC	Bandel Junction	06:08	06:10
HWH	Howrah Junction	07:20	07:50
SRC	Santragachi Junction	08:07	08:08
ULB	Uluberia	08:30	08:31
BZN	Bagnan	08:43	08:44
MCA	Mecheda	09:00	09:01
TMZ	Tamluk	09:42	09:43
KATI	Kanthi P Halt	10:44	10:45
DGHA	Digha Flag Station	12:55	--:--

== See also ==
- Howrah–New Jalpaiguri line
- Tourism in West Bengal
- New Jalpaiguri Junction railway station
- New Jalpaiguri–Sitamarhi Weekly Express
- New Jalpaiguri-Udaipur Superfast Express
- Kishanganj–Ajmer Garib Nawaz Express
- Digha railway station
