= Sitalpur railway station =

Railway station in West Bengal, India

Sitalpur

General information
- Location: State Highway 5, Sitalpur, Purba Medinipur district, West Bengal; India
- Coordinates: 21°46′24″N 87°40′15″E
- Elevation: 5 metres (16 ft)
- System: Kolkata Suburban Railway station
- Owner: Indian Railways
- Operator: South Eastern Railway
- Line: Tamluk–Digha branch line
- Platforms: 1
- Tracks: 1

Construction
- Structure type: Standard (on-ground station)

Other information
- Status: Functioning
- Station code: STLB
- Zone(s): Kolkata Suburban Railway
- Division(s): Kharagpur

History
- Opened: 2004
- Closed: present
- Electrified: 2012–13

Services
Preceding station	Kolkata Suburban Railway	Following station
Sujalpur towards Digha	South Eastern Line Tamluk–Digha branch line	Kanthi towards Howrah Junction
Route map
Location
- Location within West Bengal Location within India

Sitalpur railway station is a railway station on the Tamluk–Digha branch line of South Eastern Railway zone of Indian Railways. The railway station is situated beside State Highway 5 at Sitalpur in Purba Medinipur district in the Indian state of West Bengal.

== History ==
The Tamluk–Digha line was sanctioned in 1984–1985 Railway Budget at an estimated cost of around Rs 74 crore. Finally, this line was opened in 2004. This track including Sitalpur railway station was electrified in 2012–13.
