= Tikra railway station =

Railway station in West Bengal, India

Tikra

General information
- Location: National Highway 116B, Ramnagar, Hirapur, Purba Medinipur district, West Bengal; India
- Coordinates: 21°40′02″N 87°32′05″E
- Elevation: 4 metres (13 ft)
- System: Kolkata Suburban Railway station
- Owner: Indian Railways
- Operator: South Eastern Railway
- Line: Tamluk–Digha branch line
- Platforms: 1
- Tracks: 1

Construction
- Structure type: Standard (on-ground station)

Other information
- Status: Functioning
- Station code: TKRA
- Zone(s): Kolkata Suburban Railway
- Division(s): Kharagpur

History
- Opened: 2004
- Electrified: 2012–13

Services
| Preceding station | Kolkata Suburban Railway | Following station |
|---|---|---|
| Digha Terminus | South Eastern Line Tamluk–Digha branch line | Ramnagar (Bengal) towards Howrah Junction |
Route map
Location
- Location within West Bengal Location within India

Tikra railway station is a halt railway station on the Tamluk–Digha branch line of South Eastern Railway zone of Indian Railways. Tikra railway station is situated beside National Highway 116B, Ramnagar at Hirapur in Purba Medinipur district in the Indian state of West Bengal.

== History ==
The Tamluk–Digha line was sanctioned in 1984–85 Railway Budget at an estimated cost of around Rs 74 crore. Finally this line was opened in 2004. This track including Tikra railway station was electrified in 2012–13.
