= Ramnagar (Bengal) railway station =

Railway station in West Bengal, India

Ramnagar
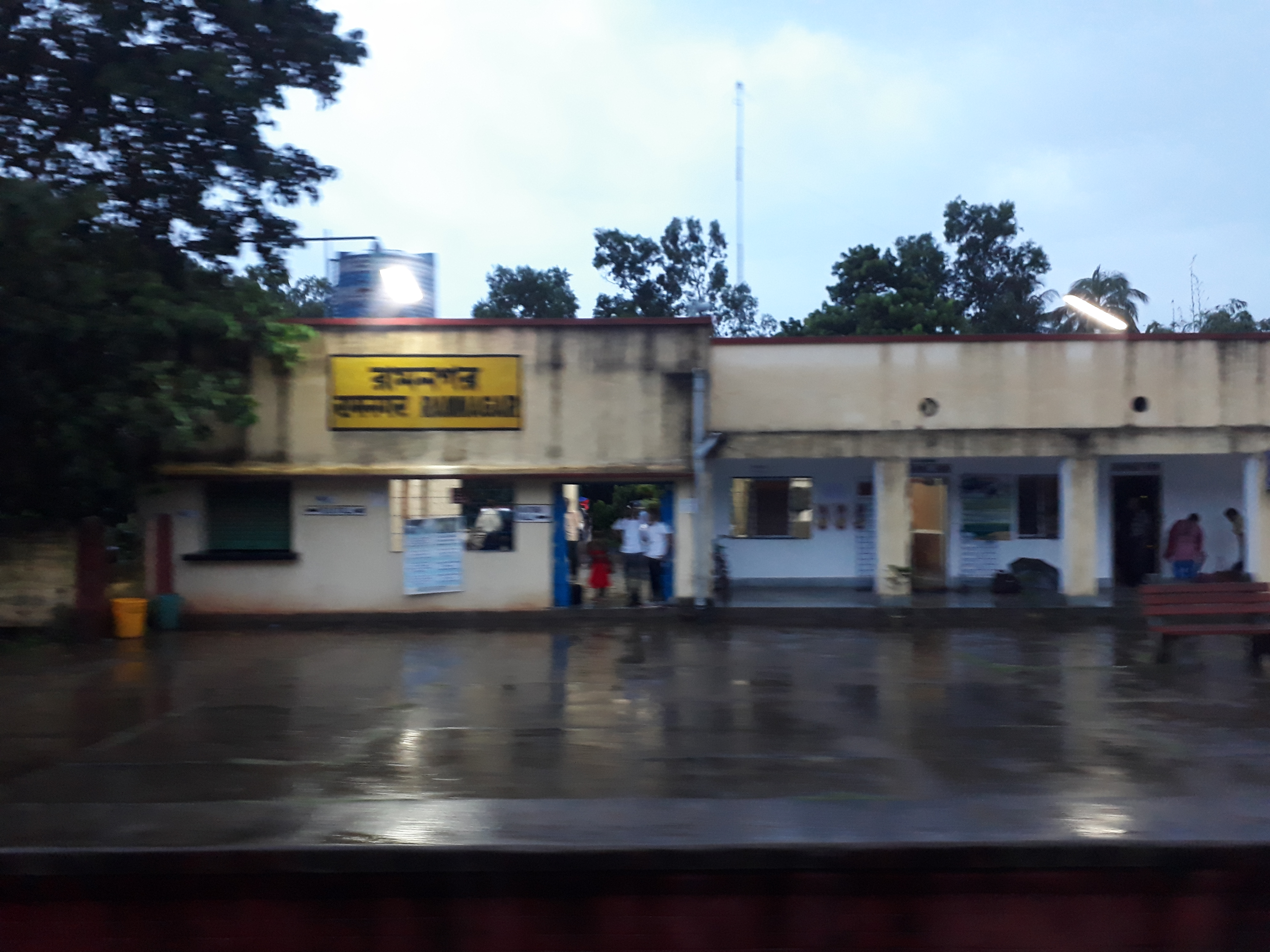

General information
- Location: National Highway 116B, Ramnagar, Dakshin Basulipat, Purba Medinipur district, West Bengal; India
- Coordinates: 21°40′37″N 87°33′14″E
- Elevation: 8 metres (26 ft)
- System: Kolkata Suburban Railway station
- Owner: Indian Railways
- Operator: South Eastern Railway
- Line: Tamluk–Digha branch line
- Platforms: 2
- Tracks: 2

Construction
- Structure type: Standard (on-ground station)

Other information
- Status: Functioning
- Station code: RMRB
- Zone(s): Kolkata Suburban Railway
- Division(s): Kharagpur

History
- Opened: 2004
- Closed: present
- Electrified: 2012–13

Services
Preceding station	Kolkata Suburban Railway	Following station
Tikra towards Digha	South Eastern Line Tamluk–Digha branch line	Badalpur towards Howrah Junction
Route map
Location
- Location within West Bengal Location within India

Ramnagar railway station is a railway station on the Tamluk–Digha branch line of South Eastern Railway zone of Indian Railways. This railway station is situated beside National Highway 116B, Dakshin Basulipat at Ramnagar in Purba Medinipur district in the Indian state of West Bengal.

== History ==
The Tamluk–Digha line was sanctioned in 1984–85 Railway Budget at an estimated cost of around Rs 74 crore. Finally this line was opened in 2004. This track including Ramnagar railway station was electrified in 2012–13.
