= Nachinda railway station =

Railway station in West Bengal, India

Nachinda

General information
- Location: Contai–Nandakumar Road, Nachinda, Purba Medinipur district, West Bengal; India
- Coordinates: 21°52′26″N 87°45′08″E
- Elevation: 4 metres (13 ft)
- System: Kolkata Suburban Railway station
- Owner: Indian Railways
- Operator: South Eastern Railway
- Line: Tamluk–Digha branch line
- Platforms: 1
- Tracks: 1

Construction
- Structure type: Standard (on-ground station)
- Parking: No

Other information
- Status: Functioning
- Station code: NCN
- Zone(s): Kolkata Suburban Railway
- Division(s): Kharagpur

History
- Opened: 2004
- Closed: present
- Electrified: 2012–13

Services
Preceding station	Kolkata Suburban Railway	Following station
Kanthi towards Digha	South Eastern Line Tamluk–Digha branch line	Gholbagda towards Howrah Junction
Route map
Location
- Location within West Bengal Location within India

Nachinda railway station is a railway station on the Tamluk–Digha branch line of South Eastern Railway zone of Indian Railways. The railway station is situated beside Contai–Nandakumar Road at Nachinda in Purba Medinipur district in the Indian state of West Bengal.

== History ==
The Tamluk–Digha line was sanctioned in 1984–85 Railway Budget at an estimated cost of around Rs 74 crore. Finally this line was opened in 2004. This track including Nachinda railway station was electrified in 2012–13.
