= Badalpur railway station =

Railway station in West Bengal, India

Badalpur

General information
- Location: State Highway 4, Khoyapur, Pashchim Ramchandrapur, Purba Medinipur district, West Bengal; India
- Coordinates: 21°42′33″N 87°36′53″E
- Elevation: 4 metres (13 ft)
- System: Kolkata Suburban Railway
- Owner: Indian Railways
- Operator: South Eastern Railway
- Line: Tamluk–Digha branch line
- Platforms: 1
- Tracks: 1

Construction
- Structure type: Standard (on-ground station)

Other information
- Status: Functioning
- Station code: BDPA
- Zone(s): Kolkata Suburban Railway
- Division(s): Kharagpur

History
- Opened: 2004
- Closed: present
- Electrified: 2012–13

Services
Preceding station	Kolkata Suburban Railway	Following station
Ramnagar (Bengal) towards Digha	South Eastern Line Tamluk–Digha branch line	Ashapurna Devi towards Howrah Junction
Route map
Location
- Location within West Bengal Location within India

Badalpur railway station is a railway station on the Tamluk–Digha branch line of South Eastern Railway zone of Indian Railways. This railway station is situated beside State Highway 4 at Khoyapur, Pashchim Ramchandrapur in Purba Medinipur district in the Indian state of West Bengal.

== History ==
The Tamluk–Digha line was sanctioned in 1984–85 Railway Budget at an estimated cost of around Rs 74 crore. Finally this line was opened in 2004. This track including Badalpur railway station was electrified in 2012–13.
