= Tamluk Junction railway station =

Railway station in West Bengal, India

Tamluk Junction
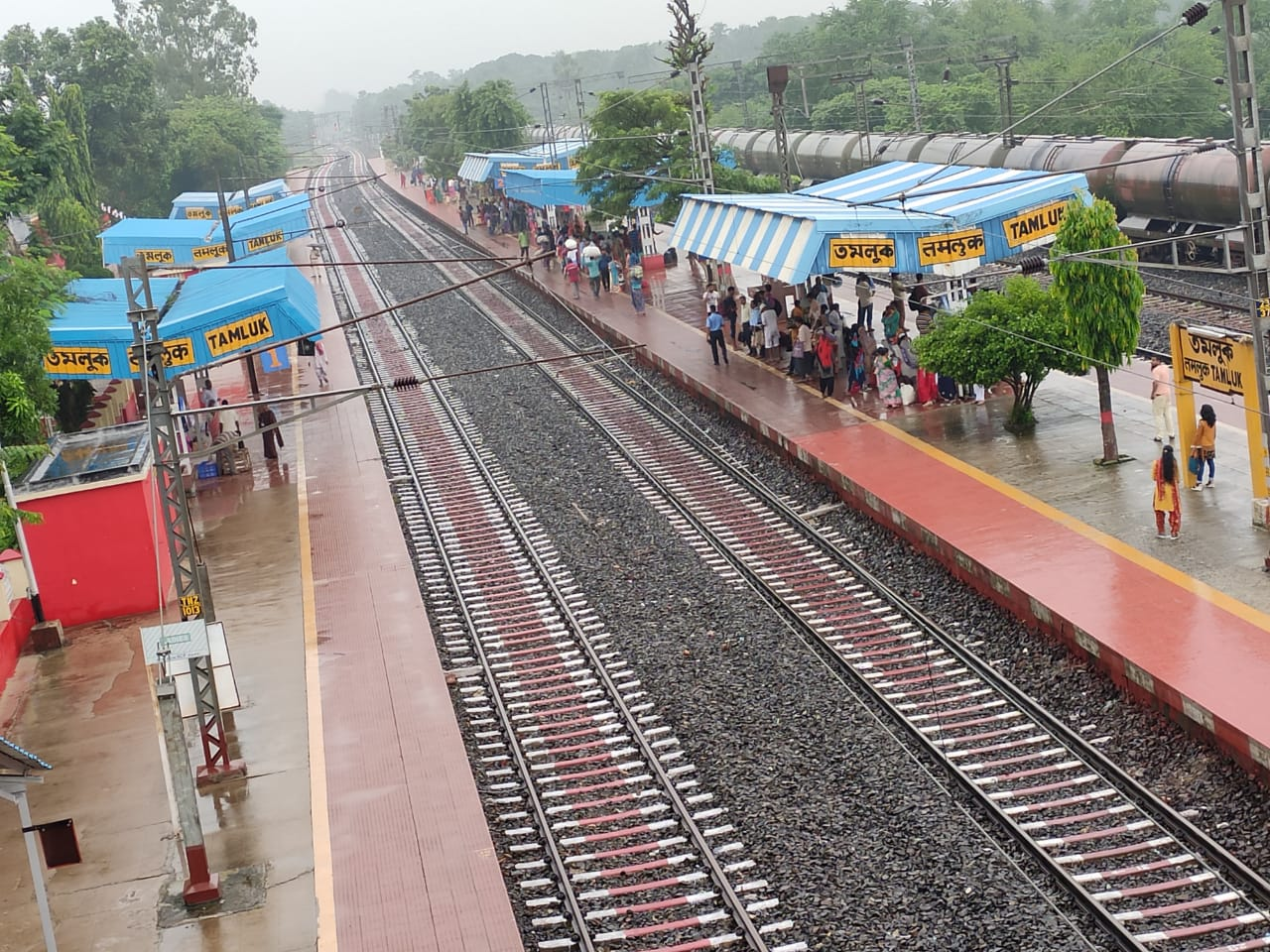
- Tamluk Junction railway station

General information
- Location: Station road, Tamluk, Purba Medinipur district, West Bengal; India
- Coordinates: 22°16′28″N 87°55′12″E
- Elevation: 4 metres (13 ft)
- System: Kolkata Suburban Railway station
- Owner: Indian Railways
- Operator: Kharagpur Division
- Lines: Panskura–Haldia line Tamluk–Digha line
- Platforms: 3
- Tracks: 6
- Connections: Bus Stand, Toto Stand

Construction
- Structure type: Standard on-ground station
- Parking: Yes
- Cycle facilities: Yes
- Accessible: Lift, Stairs, Escalator etc.

Other information
- Station code: TMZ
- Fare zone: South Eastern Railway

History
- Opened: 1968
- Electrified: 1974–76
- Former names: Tamralipta

Passengers
- 5000-10000

Services
Preceding station	Kolkata Suburban Railway	Following station
Keshabpur towards Haldia	South Eastern Line Panskura–Haldia line	Sahid Matangini towards Howrah Junction
Nandakumar towards Digha	South Eastern Line Tamluk–Digha line	Sahid Matangini towards Howrah Junction
Route map
Location
- Location within West Bengal

The Tamluk Junction railway station in the Indian state of West Bengal, serves Tamluk, the District Headquarters of Purba Medinipur district, India. It is on the Panskura–Haldia line. It is under the jurisdiction of South Eastern Railway zone. Tamluk Junction railway station is one of the busiest railway Junction stations of Kharagpur railway division & the busiest and most important railway station in the Panskura - Haldia Section & Tamluk - Digha Section. It is 91 km (57 mi) from Howrah station and 24 km (15 mi) from Panskura.

== History ==
Tamluk Junction railway station is situated in Tamluk station Road, Tamluk, West Bengal. Station code is TMZ. It is a small but busiest railway station in Panskura–Haldia line. Neighbourhood stations are Sahid Matangini and Nandakumar and Keshabpur. Digha–Malda Town Express, Vishakapatnam–Digha Superfast Express, Samudra Kanya Superfast Express, Tamralipta Express, Kandari Express, Paharia Express, Digha–Howrah Super AC express, Digha–Asansol Express and Local EMU trains Haldia–Howrah Fast Local, Digha–Panskura Local, Mecheda–Digha Local, Haldia–Panskura Local, Howrah–Haldia Local trains stop here. The Panskura–Durgachak line was opened in 1968, at a time when Haldia Port was being constructed. It was subsequently extended to Haldia. The Tamluk–Digha line was opened in 2004. The Panskura–Haldia line was electrified in 1974–76. All lines were electrified with 25 kV AC overhead system. EMU train services between Panskura and Haldia introduced in 1976 and direct EMU services between Howrah and Haldia in 1979.

== Gallery ==
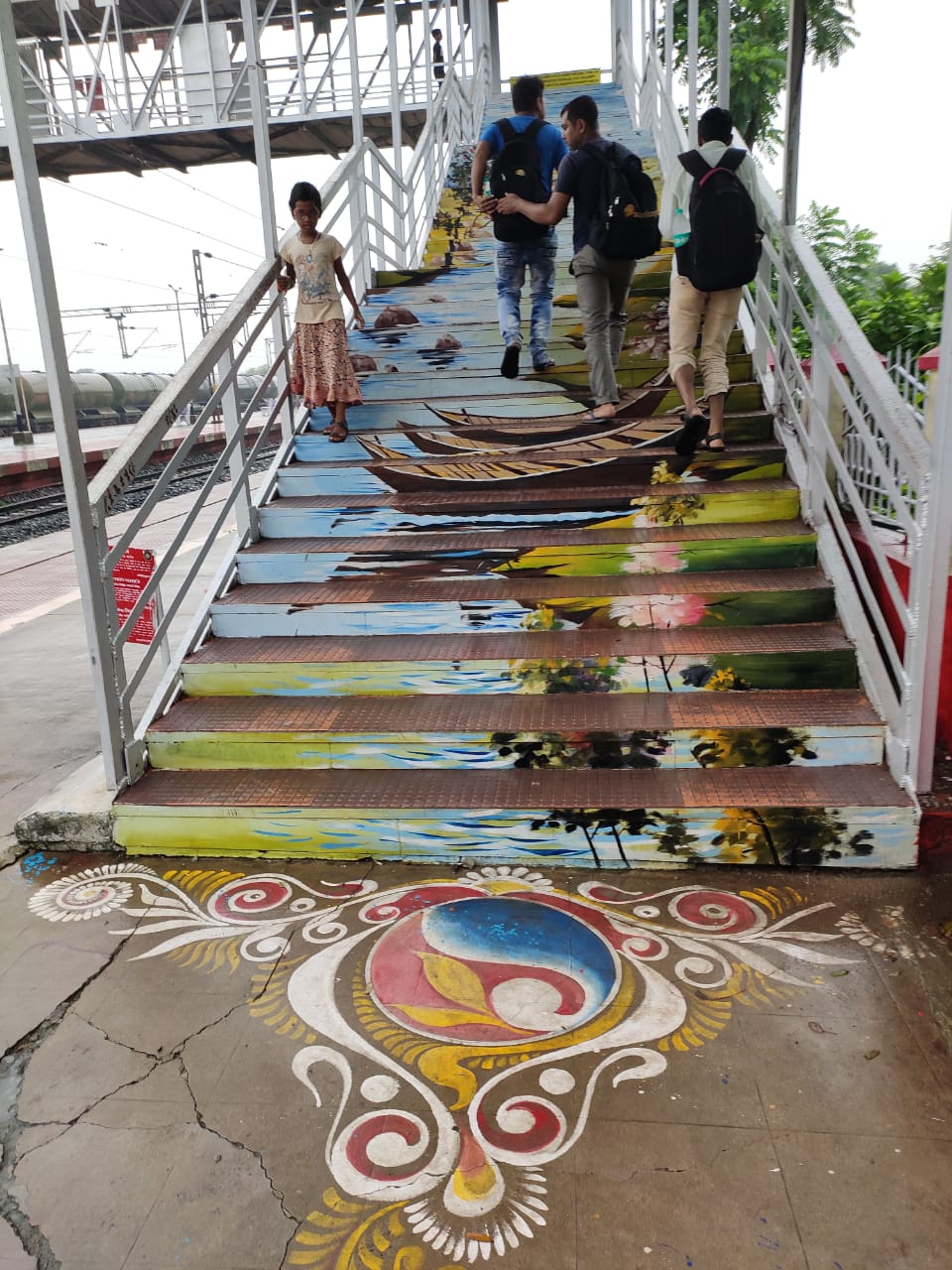
Tamluk Junction foot overbridge

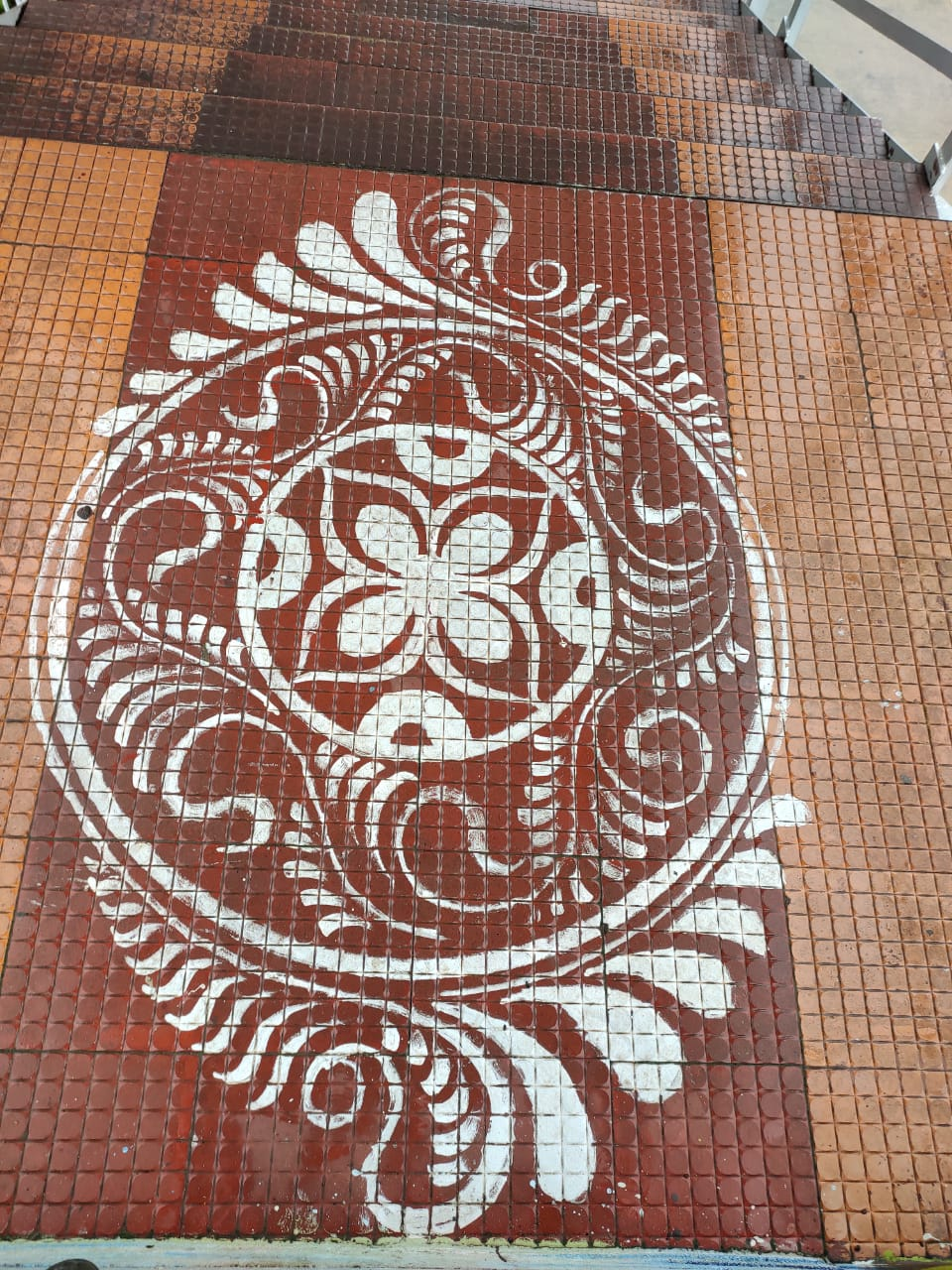
Alpona at Tamluk Junction foot overbridge

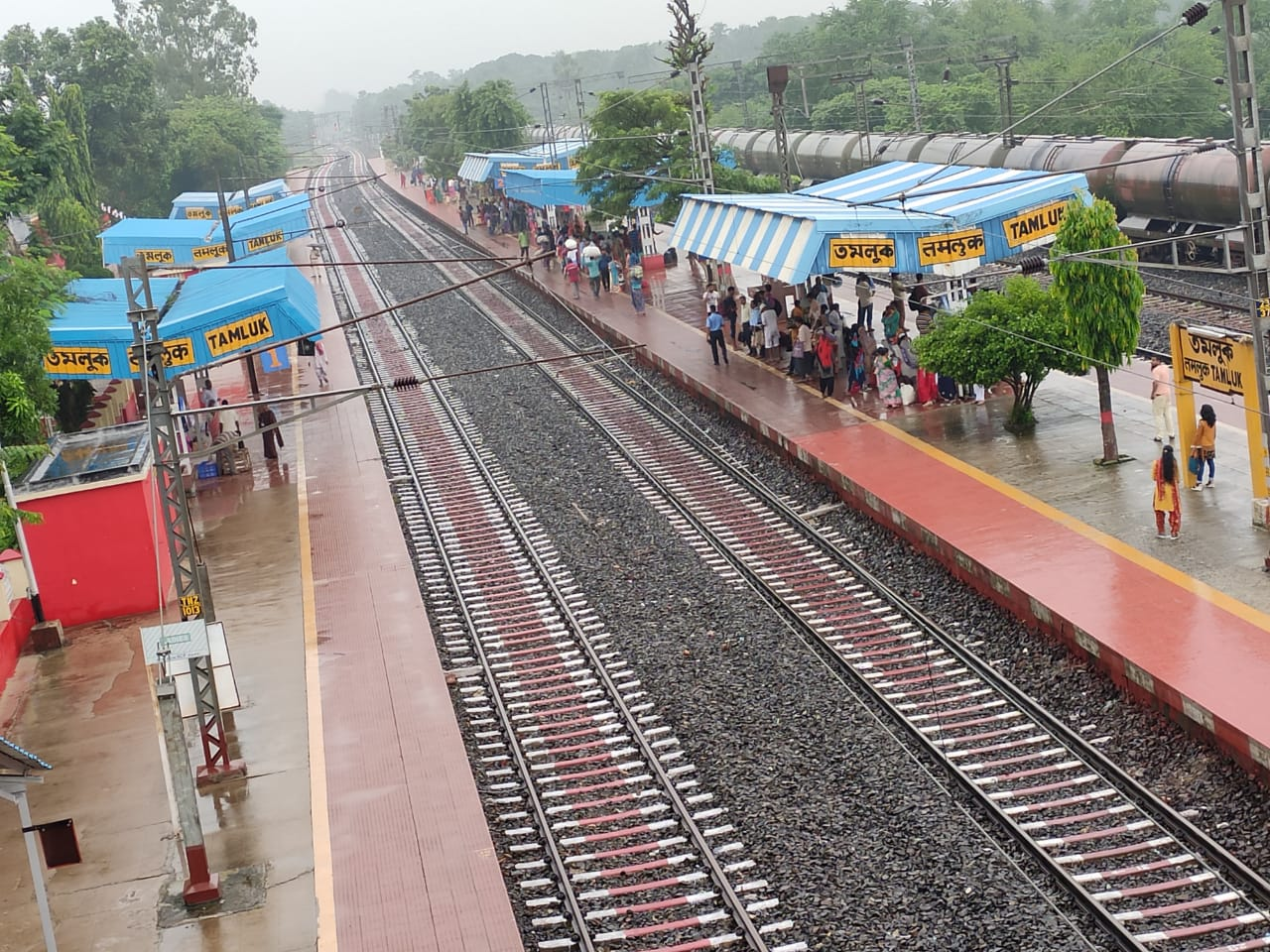
A view from foot overbridge
