= Mandarmani =

Mandarmoni
- Village & Beach
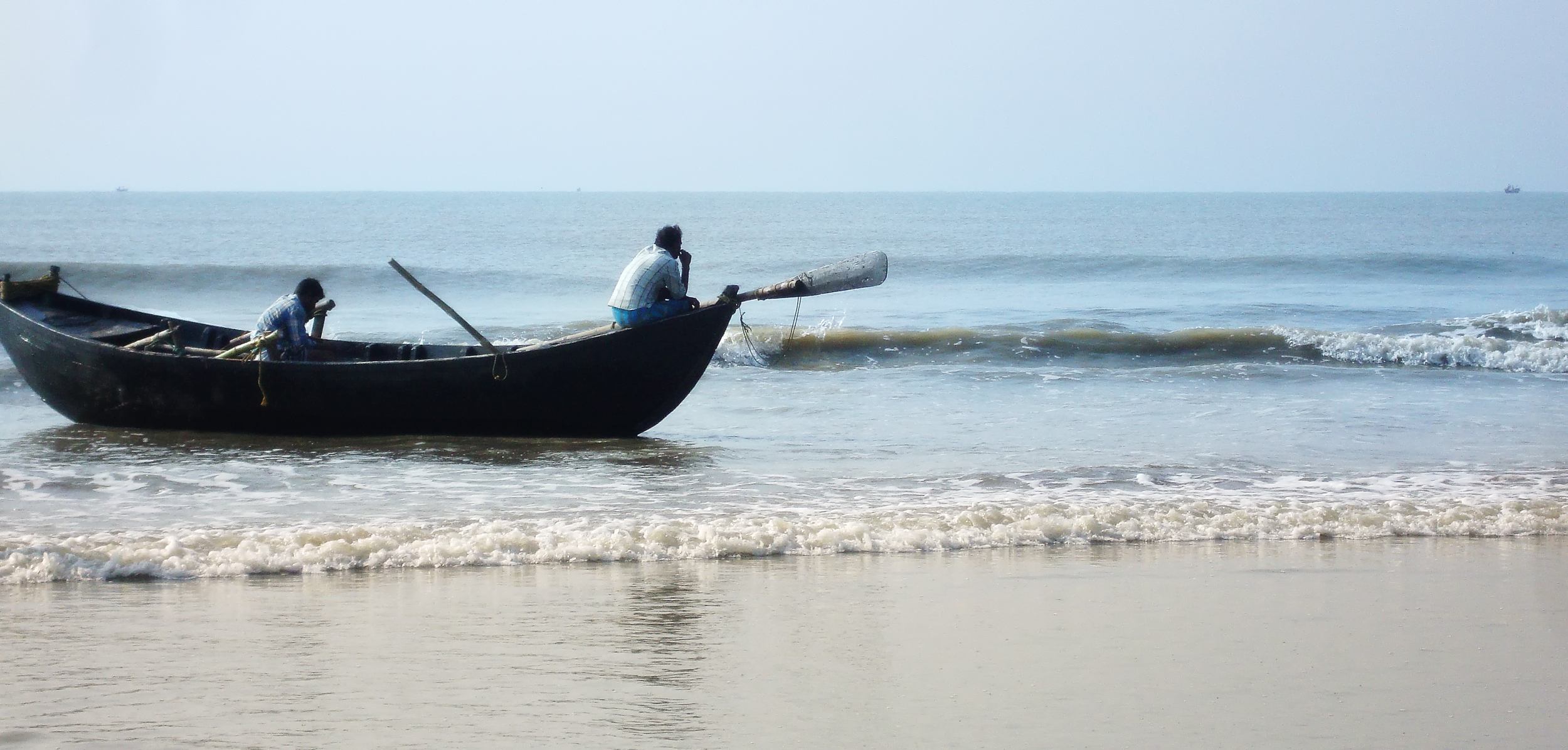
- Mandarmani Sea Beach

- Location in West Bengal, India Mandarmoni (India)
- Coordinates: 21.666°N 87.705°E
- Country: India
- State: West Bengal
- District: East Medinipur

Government
  - Body: Gram panchayat

Area
  - Total: 24.36 km^{2} (9.41 sq mi)

Population (2011)
  - Total: 12,307
  - Density: 492/km^{2} (1,270/sq mi)

Languages
  - Official: Bengali, English
- Time zone: UTC+5:30 (IST)
- ISO 3166 code: IN-WB
- Vehicle registration: WB
- Nearest city: Kolkata
- Sex ratio: 976 ♂/♀
- Literacy: 65%
- Climate: average (Köppen)

Mandarmoni is a seaside resort village in the state of West Bengal, India, and lies in East Midnapore district, at the northern end of the Bay of Bengal. It is one of the largest seaside resorts of West Bengal, fast-developing.

== Geography ==
Cities and towns in Contai subdivision of Purba Medinipur district
M: municipal city/ town, CT: census town, R: rural/ urban centre, H: historical/ religious centre, S: port, sea-beach
Owing to space constraints in the small map, the actual locations in a larger map may vary slightly

=== Location ===
It is almost 200 km from Kolkata Airport on the old Delhi route. Red crabs crawling around the 13 km long beach is a special attraction of Mandarmani. It was argued to be the longest drive-in beach in India. It is located under Contai Sub-division area.

Geomorphologically, this area has relatively low waves than nearer tourist beach of Digha. However still this beach is deposition with formation of neo dunes in several areas specially around Dadanpatrabar.

== Etymology ==
Initially, after its discovery, this beach was named Mandarboni and also Madar Mani. But with time it came to be known as Mandarmani.

== Transportation ==
Mandarmani can be best reached by road, however local police currently restricts private cars to drive across the beach. A proper road has been built allowing tourists to reach their hotels from the backside.

=== By train ===
The nearest railway station is Contai (17 km) and Ashapurna Devi railway station and the nearest airport is Kolkata. There are also multiple buses running every half-hour from 7 am till 6 pm.

=== By car ===
From Kolkata, after crossing the Vidyasagar Setu, Kona Expressway leads to Mumbai Road. As the total drive takes about 3.5–4 hours from Kolkata via Kolaghat and Nandakumar. From Nandakumar there is a right turn towards Contai. In the said Kolkata- Digha highway there is stoppage named Chawalkhola where a left side village road ends at a sea-side village called Mandarmani.

There are two toll plazas on the route at Dhulagori and Sonapetya.

== Activities ==
The beach is the primary attraction offering tourists to enjoy the sea from early morning to late afternoon. From 3 PM onwards, people head out nearer resorts where beach bikes, ropeway etc. can be availed. There are also a string of local shops selling shells, handmade jewellery and handicrafts. A few locals also offer groups to take trip towards the mohana (Estuary) during sunset.

== Gallery ==
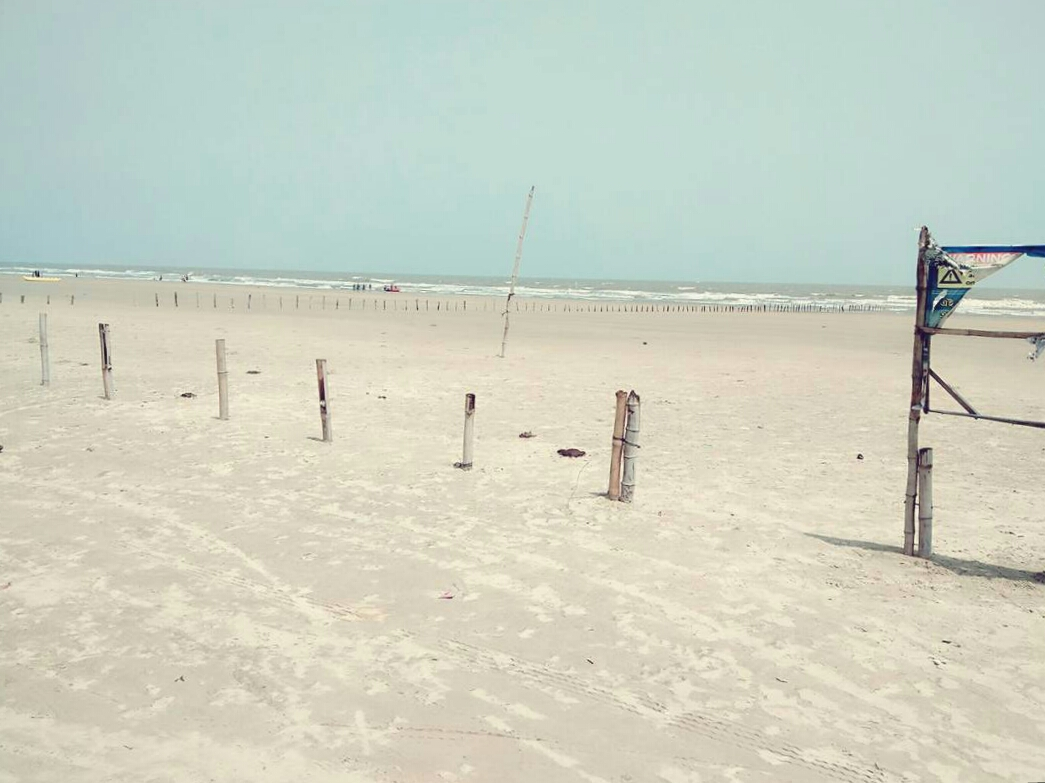
Mandarmani beach

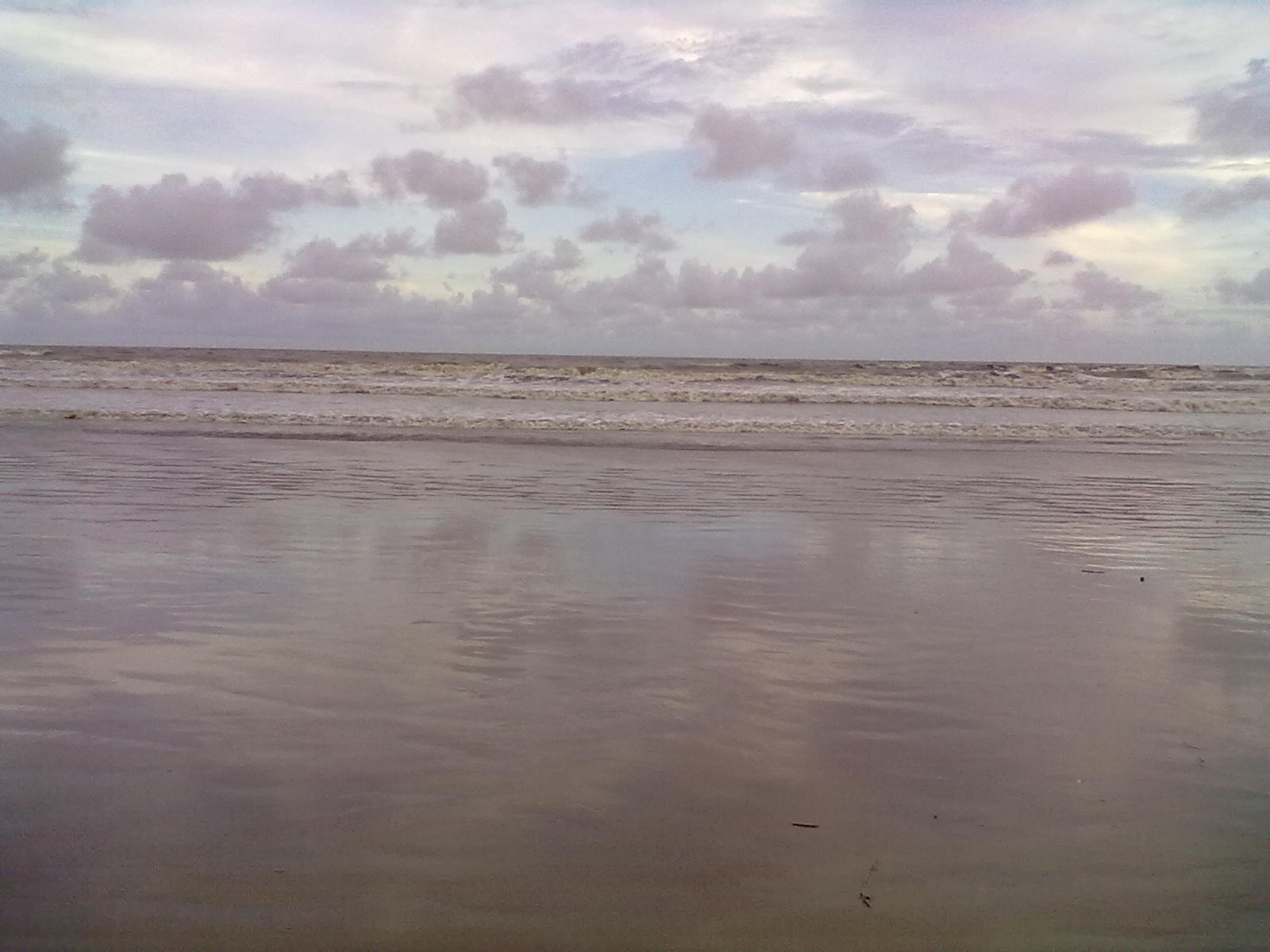
Mandarmani sea beach

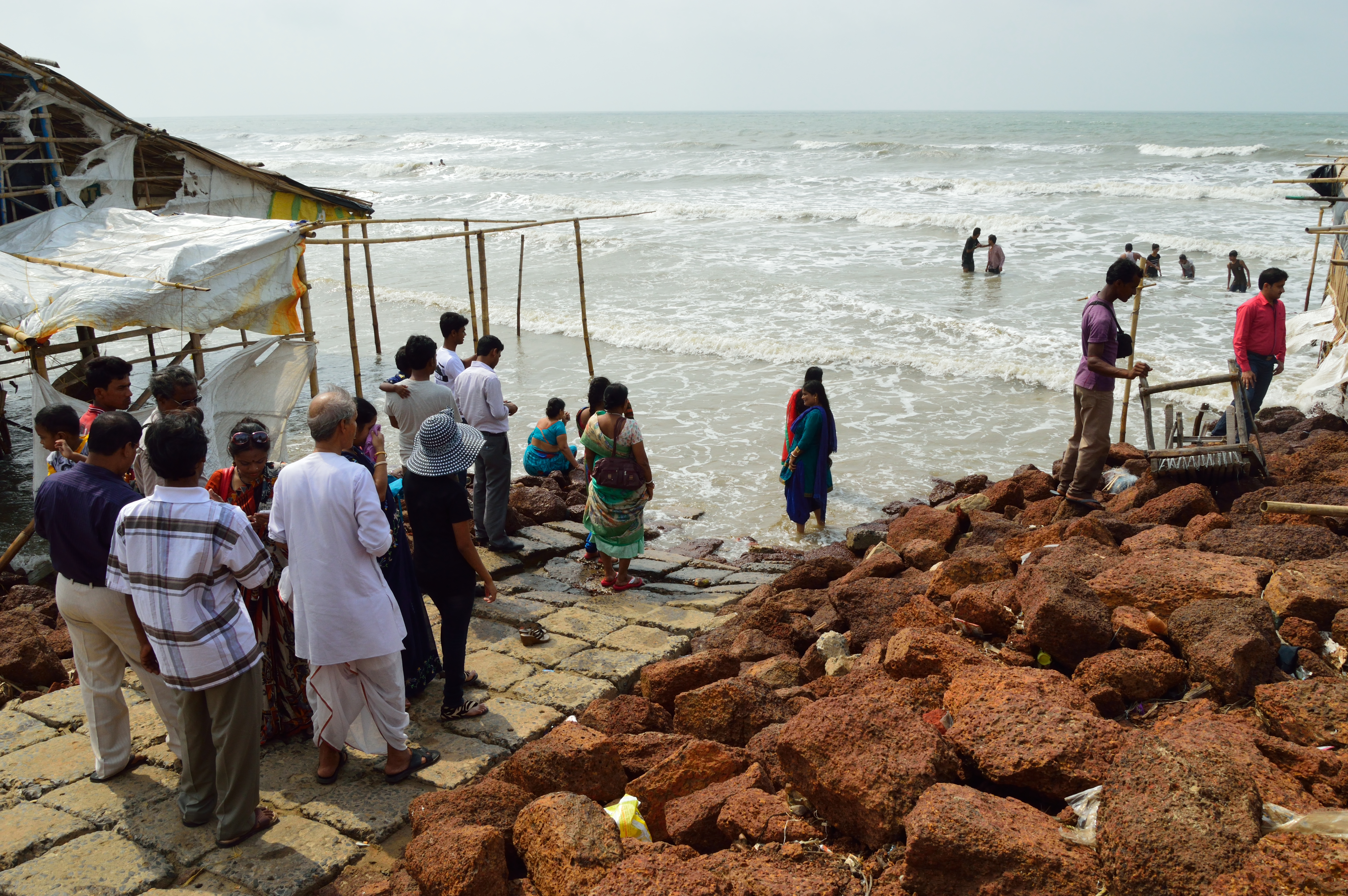
Mandarmani ghat

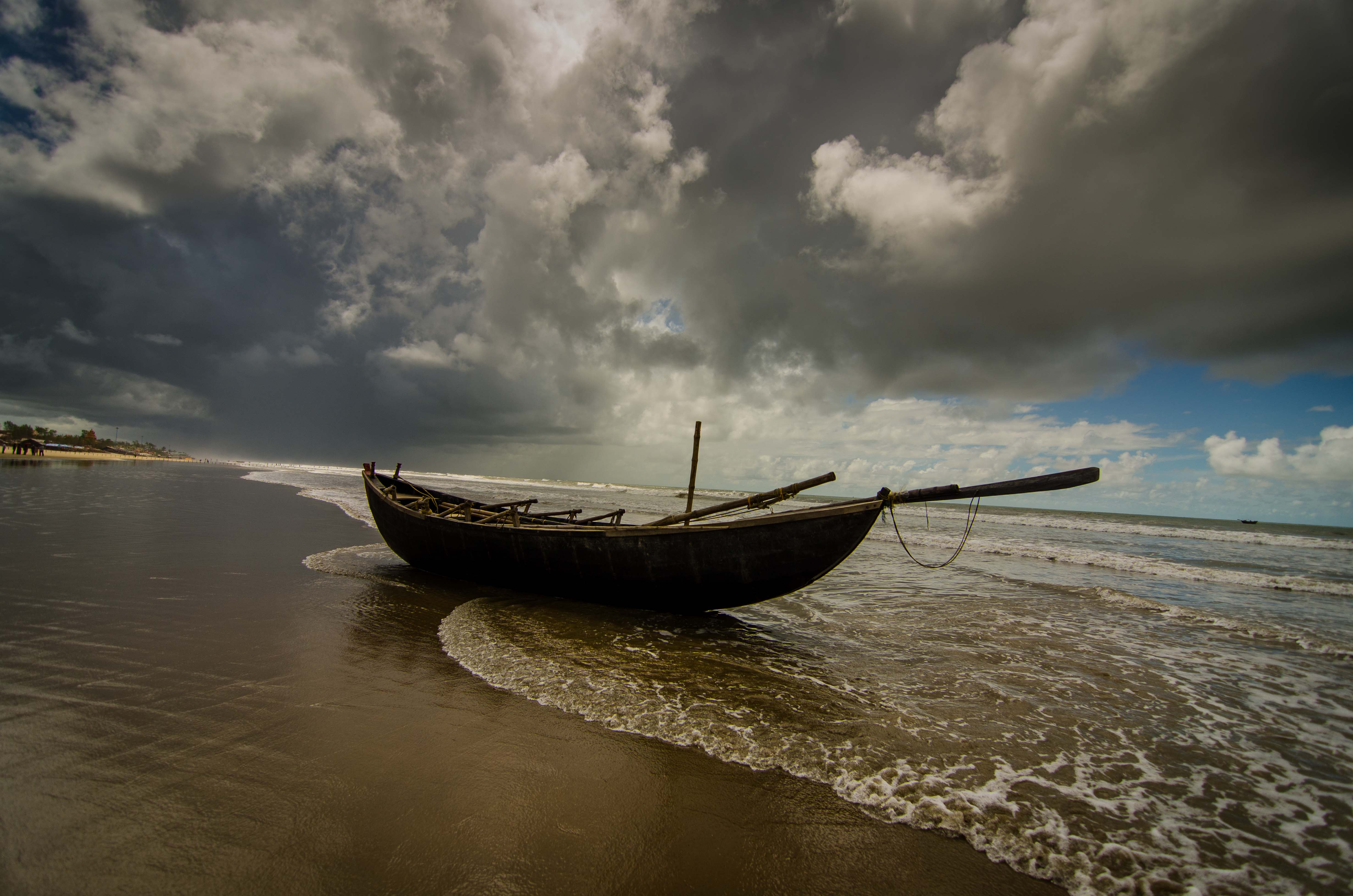
Mandarmani beach

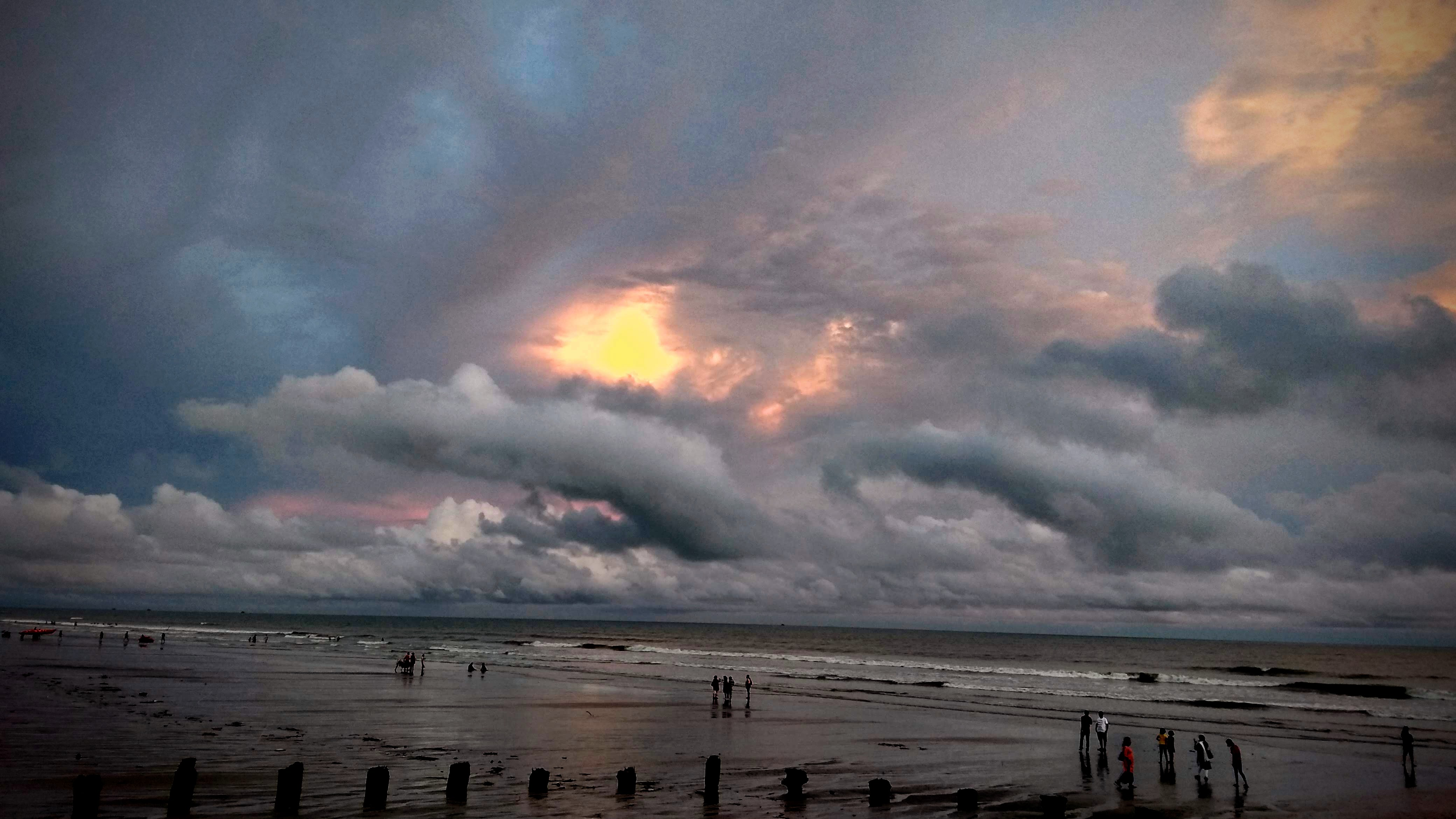
Sunset at Mandarmani Beach

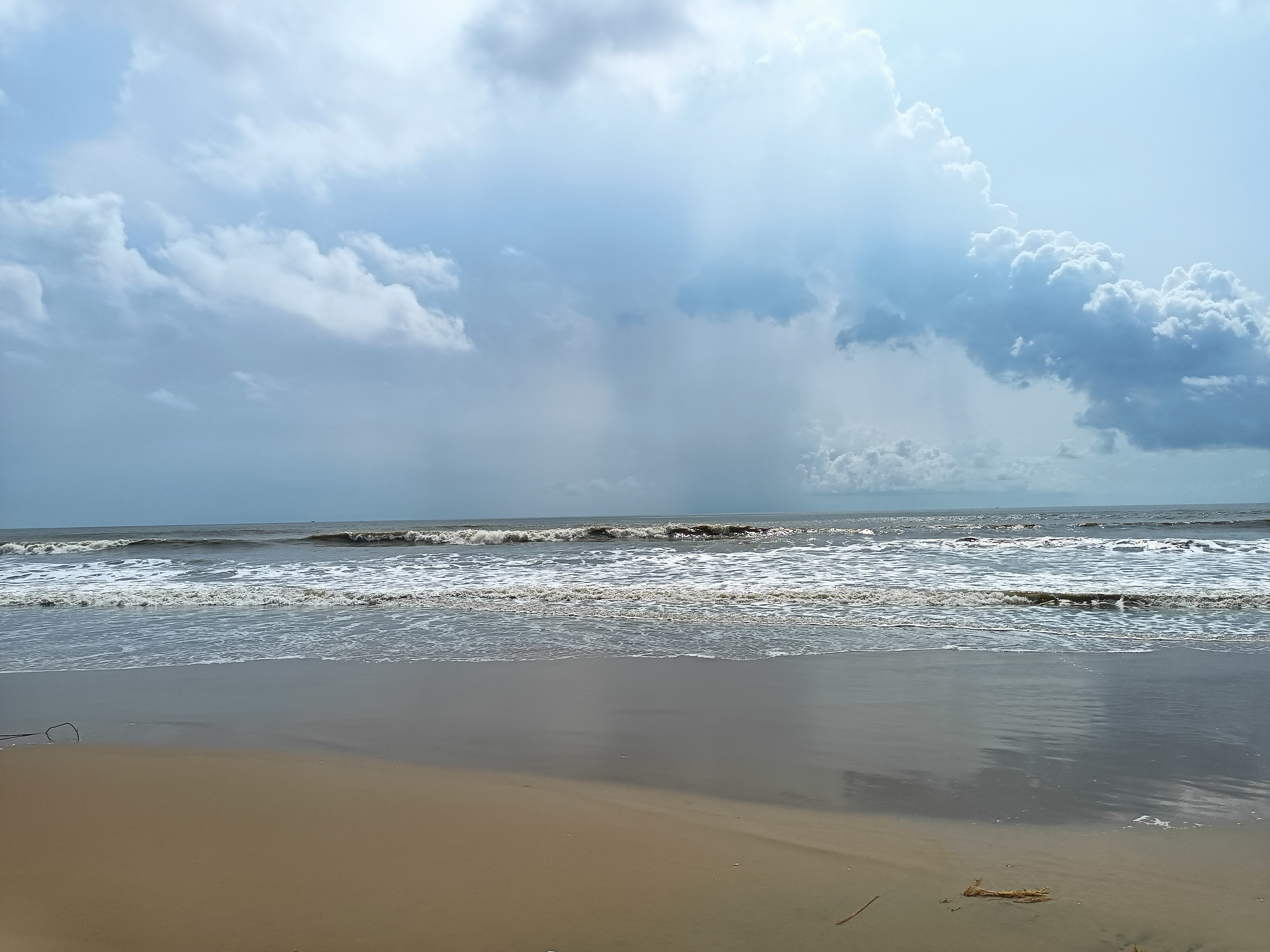
Mesmerizing beach of Mandarmani
