= South Eastern line (Kolkata Suburban Railway) =

Line of Kolkata Suburban Railway

South Eastern line

Overview
- Status: Operational
- Owner: Indian Railway
- Locale: Howrah, West Bengal; Paschim Medinipur, West Bengal; Purba Medinipur, West Bengal
- Termini: Howrah Junction & Shalimar; Midnapore, Kharagpur, Amta, Haldia, Digha
- Stations: Total stations: 87; Interchange stations: 5

Service
- System: Kolkata Suburban Railway
- Operator: South Eastern Railway (SER)
- Depot(s): Tikiapara, Panskura & Kharagpur
- Daily ridership: 0.875 million

History
- Opened: 19 April 1900; 126 years ago

Technical
- Line length: 341 km (212 mi)
- Character: At Grade
- Track gauge: 5 ft 6 in (1,676 mm) broad gauge
- Electrification: 25,000 V

The South Eastern Line of Kolkata Suburban Railway is a suburban railway line serving Kolkata, West Bengal, India. It consists of 37 stations from Howrah Junction to Midnapore. The entire line is at grade level. It has section of triple track starting from Howrah Junction and ends at Midnapore, Amta, Haldia and Digha stations in West Bengal.

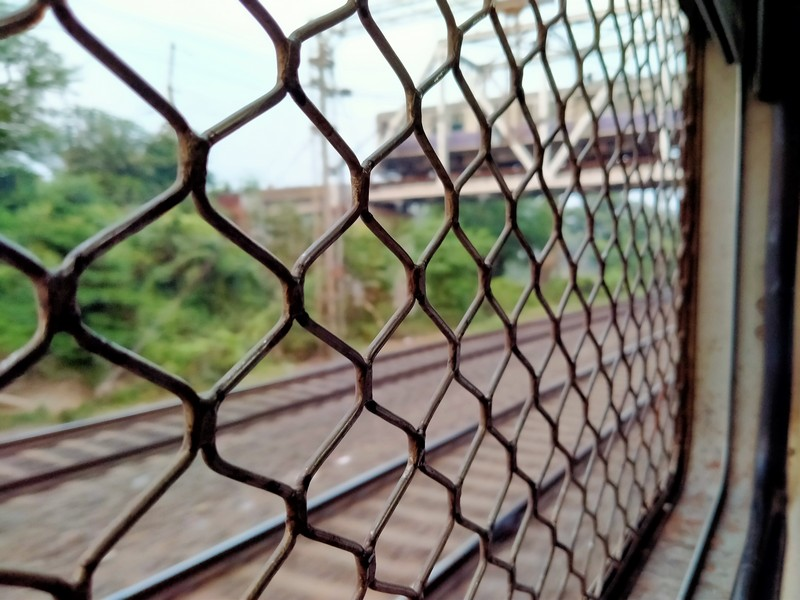
Amta line bound train is crossing Howrah south line near Mourigram.

The South Eastern line in Kolkata consists of 3 major corridors, which bifurcate as they run into the suburban satellite towns. Two corridors (one local and other through) follow the South Eastern Railway run from Howrah Junction (HWH) to Midnapore (128 km). At the mainline there is a bifurcation into two branch lines – one from Panskura to Haldia (69 km) in the south-east and the other from Shalimar to Amta (50 km) in the west. These two corridors constitute the 'main' South Eastern line.

The major car sheds on this line are at Tikiapara, Panskura & Kharagpur. There are fast and slow locals here for suburban service. Trains usually start from and terminate at important stations.

== Stations with Routes ==
=== Routes ===
The South Eastern line consists of the following routes:

- Howrah Jn – Midnapore
- Panskura Jn – Haldia
- Shalimar – Amta
- Tamluk Jn – Digha
- Andul - Dankuni

=== Stations ===
Names in bold indicate that the station is a fast train stop as well as important terminal.

==== Main line ====
South Eastern line (Main)
#	Distance from Howrah Jn (km)	Station Name	Station Code	Connections
1	0	**Howrah Junction**	HWH	^{†}Eastern and **Howrah**
2	3	Tikiapara	TPKR	None
3	4	Dasnagar	DSNR	None
4	6	Ramrajatala	RMJ	None
5	7	**Santragachi Junction**	SRC	Shalimar/Amta (South Eastern line)
6	11	Mourigram	MRGM	None
7	12	Andul	ADL	Chord link
8	16	Sankrail	SEL	None
9	18	Abada	ABB	None
10	20	Nalpur	NALR	None
11	24	Bauria	BVA	None
12	27	Chengel	CGA	None
13	30	Phuleswar	FLR	None
14	32	Uluberia	ULB	None
15	36	Bir Shibpur	BSBP	None
16	40	Kulgachia	KGY	None
17	45	**Bagnan**	BZN	None
18	48	Ghoraghata	GGTA	None
19	51	Deulti	DTE	None
20	55	Kolaghat	KIG	None
21	58	**Mecheda**	MCA	None
22	61	Nandaigajan	NDGJ	None
23	64	Bhogpur	BOP	None
24	67	Narayan Pakuria Murail	NPMR	Haldia/Digha (South Eastern line)
25	71	**Panskura Junction**	PKU	Haldia/Digha (South Eastern line)
26	76	Khirai	KHAI	None
27	80	Haur	HAUR	None
28	85	Radhamohanpur	RDU	None
29	88	Duan	DUAN	None
30	91	Balichak	BCK	None
31	96	Shyamchak	SMCK	None
32	102	Madpur	MPD	None
33	108	Jakpur	JPR	None
34	115	**Kharagpur Junction**	KGP	None
35	117	Girimaidan	GMDN	None
36	121	Gokulpur	GKL	None
37	125	Cossye Halt	CSY	None
38	128	**Midnapore**	MDN	None

†Howrah Junction railway station is a terminus for South Eastern Railway and Eastern Railway.

==== Main line Branches ====
At the main line of South Eastern line, there is a bifurcation in two sections and one line crosses onto it.

===== West branch line =====
West branch line
#	Distance from Shalimar (km)	Station Name	Station Code	Connections
1	0	**Shalimar**	SHM	None
2	3	Padmapukur	PDPK	None
3	5	**Santragachi Junction**	SRC	South Eastern line (Main)
4	11	Bankra Nayabaz	BKNM	Chord link
5	13	Baltikuri	BALT	Chord link
6	15	Kona	KONA	None
7	18	Dansi	DNI	None
8	20	Jhaluarbar	JLBR	None
9	21	Makardaha	MDC	None
10	23	Domjur Road	DMJR	None
11	25	Domjur	DJR	None
12	28	Dakshinbari	DKB	None
13	32	Bargachia	BAC	None
14	35	Pantihal	PTHL	None
15	37	Munsirhat	MNH	None
16	38	Mahendralalnagar	MHLN	None
17	42	Maju	MJH	None
18	45	Jalalsi	JLI	None
19	47	Harishdadpur	HDC	None
20	50	**Amta**	AMZ	None

===== South East branch line =====
South East branch line
#	Distance from Panskura Jn (km)	Station Name	Station Code	Connections
1	0	**Panskura Junction**^{†}	PKU	South Eastern line (Main)
2	8	Raghunathbari	RGX	None
3	16	Rajgoda	RGA	None
4	21	Sahid Matangini	SMTG	None
5	24	**Tamluk Junction**^{†}	TMZ	Digha (South Eastern line)
6	31	Keshabpur	KSBP	None
7	36	Satish Samanta Halt	SSPH	None
8	39	Mahishadal	MSDL	None
9	47	Barda	BRDB	None
10	53	Basulya Sutahata	BYSA	None
11	59	Durgachak	DZK	None
12	62	Durgachak Town	DZKT	None
13	65	Silpaprabesh	SLPR	None
14	67	Bandar	BAAR	None
15	69	**Haldia**	HLZ	None
† – Branch Line starts at Panskura

†Tamluk railway station acts as a Junction station and makes a branch line to Digha.

===== South branch line =====
South branch line
#	Distance from Tamluk (km)	Station Name	Station Code	Connections
1	0	**Tamluk Junction**^{†}	TMZ	Panskura / Haldia (South Eastern line)
2	10	Nandakumar	NDKR	None
3	21	Lavan Satyagrah Smarak	LSGS	None
4	32	Deshapran	DSPN	None
5	39	Henria	HEN	None
6	51	Nachinda	NCN	None
7	62	Kanthi	KATI	None
8	68	Sitalpur	STLB	None
9	71	Sujalpur	SJPA	None
10	76	Ashapurna Devi	APRD	None
11	78	Badalpur	BDPA	None
12	86	Ramnagar	RMRB	None
13	88	Tikra	TKRA	None
14	94	**Digha**	DGHA	None
† – Branch Line starts at Tamluk

== Electrification ==
SER electrified the South Eastern line to 25,000 V AC in the period of 1967 to 1969 with the different phases: Howrah – Maurigram, Maurigram – Bauria, Bauria – Uluberia, Uluberia – Shyamchak, Shyamchak – Kharagpur. During this period the first EMU train on this line was started on Howrah – Mecheda route after completion of this route it was extended to Kharagpur on 1 February 1969.

In the period 1974 to 1976, Panskura – Haldia line was also electrified with the two phases: Panskura – Durgachak & Durgachak – Haldia, After that EMU services was started on this line at 1 May 1976.

In 1985, The Kharagpur – Midnapore line was also electrified.

== Services ==
Currently, the South Eastern Railway Running 12 Car Services on South Eastern line, Before May 2018 The 9 Car rakes was running due to an increase in passenger transport conversion of 9 Car Rakes into 12 Car rakes was started for ease of transportation.

And also, South Eastern Railway is also Running a GPS based 3-phase Medha ICF EMU train with CCTV cameras in ladies compartment in suburban sections, which was flagged off on 22 March 2018.

== See also ==
- Kolkata Suburban Railway
- List of Kolkata Suburban Railway stations
- South Eastern Railway zone
