= Uluberia railway station =

Railway station in West Bengal, India

Uluberia

General information
- Location: Uluberia, Distt. Howrah, West Bengal; India
- Coordinates: 22°28′21″N 88°05′37″E
- Elevation: 10 metres (33 ft)
- System: Kolkata Suburban Railway station
- Owner: Indian Railways
- Operator: South Eastern Railway
- Line: Howrah–Kharagpur line
- Platforms: 6

Construction
- Structure type: At grade
- Parking: No
- Cycle facilities: Yes

Other information
- Status: Functioning
- Station code: ULB
- Zone(s): South Eastern Railway
- Division(s): Kharagpur

History
- Opened: 1900
- Electrified: 1967–69
- Former names: Bengal Nagpur Railway

Services
Preceding station	Kolkata Suburban Railway	Following station
Bir Shibpur towards Midnapore	South Eastern Line Howrah–Kharagpur line	Phuleswar towards Howrah Junction
Route map
Location
- Location within West Bengal Location within India

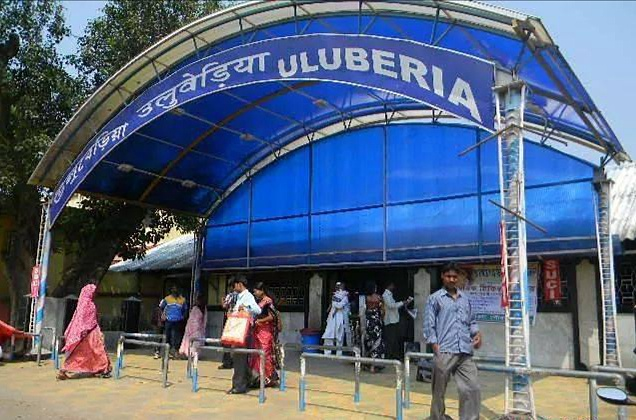
Southern entrance area of Uluberia Railway Station

Uluberia is a railway station on the Howrah–Kharagpur line and is located in Howrah district in the Indian state of West Bengal. It serves Uluberia.

== History ==
The Howrah–Kharagpur line was opened in 1900.

== Tracks ==
The Howrah–Kharagpur stretch has three lines.

== Electrification ==
The Howrah–Kharagpur line was electrified in 1967–69.
