= Roddur Roy =

Indian poet, novelist, and controversial media personality

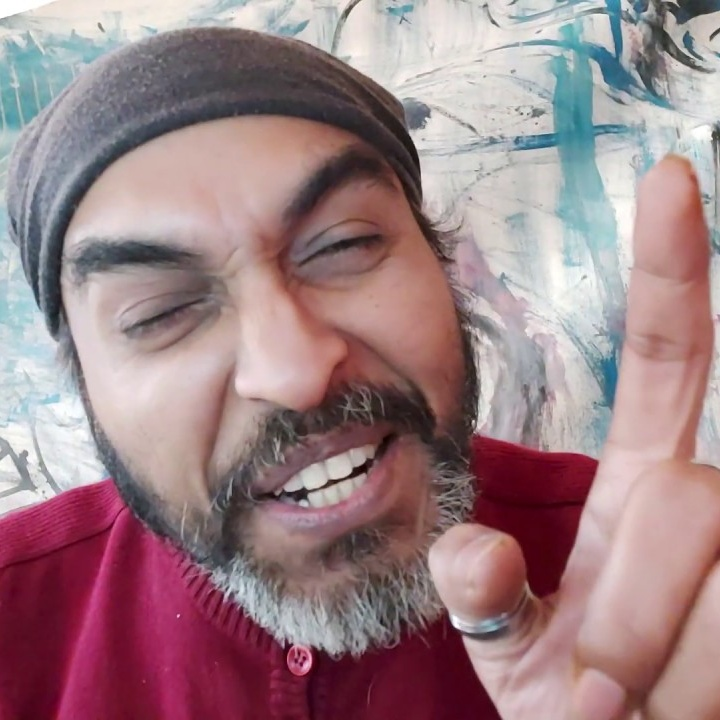
- Born: Anirban Roy
- Education: Ramnagar College

YouTube information
- Channel: Roddur Roy
- Years active: 2012–present
- Subscribers: 479 thousand
- Views: 58 million
- Last updated: 08 July 2026

Anirban Roy (more popularly, Roddur Roy) is a social media personality, and a self-proclaimed spiritual guru, poet, and novelist. His poems extensively employ the usage of subaltern language as a post-modernist practice, inspired by Nabarun Bhattacharya's book Purander Vater Kobita. His poems convey anti-establishment ethos, imbuing sexual innuedos. He rose to prominence with his eccentric persona and showcasing of performative art in his videos, and especially his unrestrained use of swear words.

== Personal life ==
Roy was born in Ramnagar. He graduated from Ramnagar College and worked for an IT company in Noida but left it to pursue his studies. He donated about 12 million to various organisations for the welfare of the socially marginalised.

== Moxa ==
Moxa (or Moxism) is an anarchist ideology much akin to the ideologies of the Beats or Hungryalists. Roy often uses the slang baalnagorik to pejoratively refer to the outsiders, especially bourgeoisie citizens, who’re complacent to capitalism and the state.

== Filmography ==
Roy is primarily an artist. As of 2026, he has written, directed and produced a bilingual—Bengali and English—arthouse film named The Myth of Rainbird. The trailer for the film was released on April 15, 2021, and itself released on November 5, 2024. The film is about three close-knit individuals, who grow disillusioned with their lives amidst the totalitarian era, and subsequently venture to create a new civilisation. It is perceived to be a work of post-modernist performative art.

== YouTube ==
Roy’s YouTube career began in 2010. In his early days, he primarily sang Ranbindrasangeet with an eccentric choice of instruments (r.g. xylophones) and recited Sukumar Roy’s poems. His signature postmodernist expletive-laden style emerged in the subsequent years, and gained a cult following thereafter for his avant-garde approach. Through his videos, he peddled his radical anarchist ideologies of Moxism. His poetry recitals begin with him declaring himself as “Bishwakabi” (lit. world poet), a title originally conferred upon Rabindranath Tagore.

== Books ==
Roy has written three novels, and a poetry collection.

- And Stella Turns a Mom
- MoxaReneissance
- Porom Kaorha Kabyo Grontho
- Moxa Kobita

== Controversies ==
=== RBU Controversy (2020) ===
In 2020, Roy created a parody of Shedin Dujone: a song written by Rabindranath Tagore. The video attracted attention for its use of vulgar language, and subsequently a complaint was filed against Roy after students from Rabindra Bharati University wrote the lyrics on their bodies in the lead up to the Holi festival. Roy challenged the authorities to come after him, and was temporarily arrested following the incident.

=== Abusing CM of West Bengal (2022) ===
In 2022, Roy made several controversial and derogatory comments on then-chief minister of West Bengal Mamata Banerjee over her reception of Sahitya Akademi Award for Kabita Bitan. Roy also harshly criticized Rupankar Bagchi over provocative comments on KK after his death. AITC's Santanu Sen filed an FIR against Roy on 3 June 2022. The Kolkata Police arrested Roy from South Goa on 7 June 2022. He was granted bail on 21 June 2022.
