= Nimpura railway station =

Railway Station in West Bengal

General information
- Location: Nimpura, Kharagpur, Paschim Medinipur district, West Bengal; India
- Coordinates: 22.319921°N 87.320169°E
- Elevation: 48 m (157 ft)
- System: Passenger train station
- Owner: Indian Railways
- Operator: South Eastern Railway
- Line: Howrah–Nagpur–Mumbai line
- Platforms: 2

Construction
- Structure type: Standard (on ground station)

Other information
- Status: Functioning
- Station code: NMP
- Zone(s): South Eastern Railway zone
- Division(s): Kharagpur railway division

History
- Former names: Bengal Nagpur Railway
Location
- Location within India Location within West Bengal

Nimpura railway station is a railway station on Howrah–Nagpur–Mumbai line under Kharagpur railway division of South Eastern Railway zone. It is situated at Kharagpur in Paschim Medinipur district in the Indian state of West Bengal.
