= Kanthi railway station =

Railway station in West Bengal, India

Kanthi
- Kanthi (Contai) railway station platform

General information
- Location: Kanthi Bypass Road, Contai, Purba Medinipur district, West Bengal; India
- Coordinates: 21°47′19″N 87°44′02″E
- Elevation: 3 metres (9.8 ft)
- System: Kolkata Suburban Railway station
- Owner: Indian Railways
- Operator: South Eastern Railway
- Line: Tamluk–Digha branch line
- Platforms: 2
- Tracks: 3

Construction
- Structure type: At grade
- Parking: No
- Cycle facilities: Yes

Other information
- Status: Functioning
- Station code: KATI
- Zone(s): Kolkata Suburban Railway
- Division(s): Kharagpur

History
- Opened: 2004
- Closed: present
- Electrified: 2012–13

Services
| Preceding station | Kolkata Suburban Railway | Following station |
|---|---|---|
| Sitalpur towards Digha | South Eastern Line Tamluk–Digha branch line | Nachinda towards Howrah Junction |
Route map
Location
- Location within West Bengal Location within India

Kanthi railway station is a railway station on the Tamluk–Digha branch line of South Eastern Railway zone of Indian Railways. The railway station is situated beside Kanthi Bypass Road at Contai in Purba Medinipur district in the Indian state of West Bengal. The distance between Howrah and this railway station is approximately 152 km. Number of Express and passengers trains stop at Kanthi railway station.

== History ==
The Tamluk–Digha line was sanctioned in 1984–85 Railway Budget at an estimated cost of around Rs 74 crore. Finally this line was opened in 2004. This track including Kanthi railway station was electrified in 2012–13.
