= Panskura Junction railway station =

Railway Station in West Bengal, India

Panskura Junction
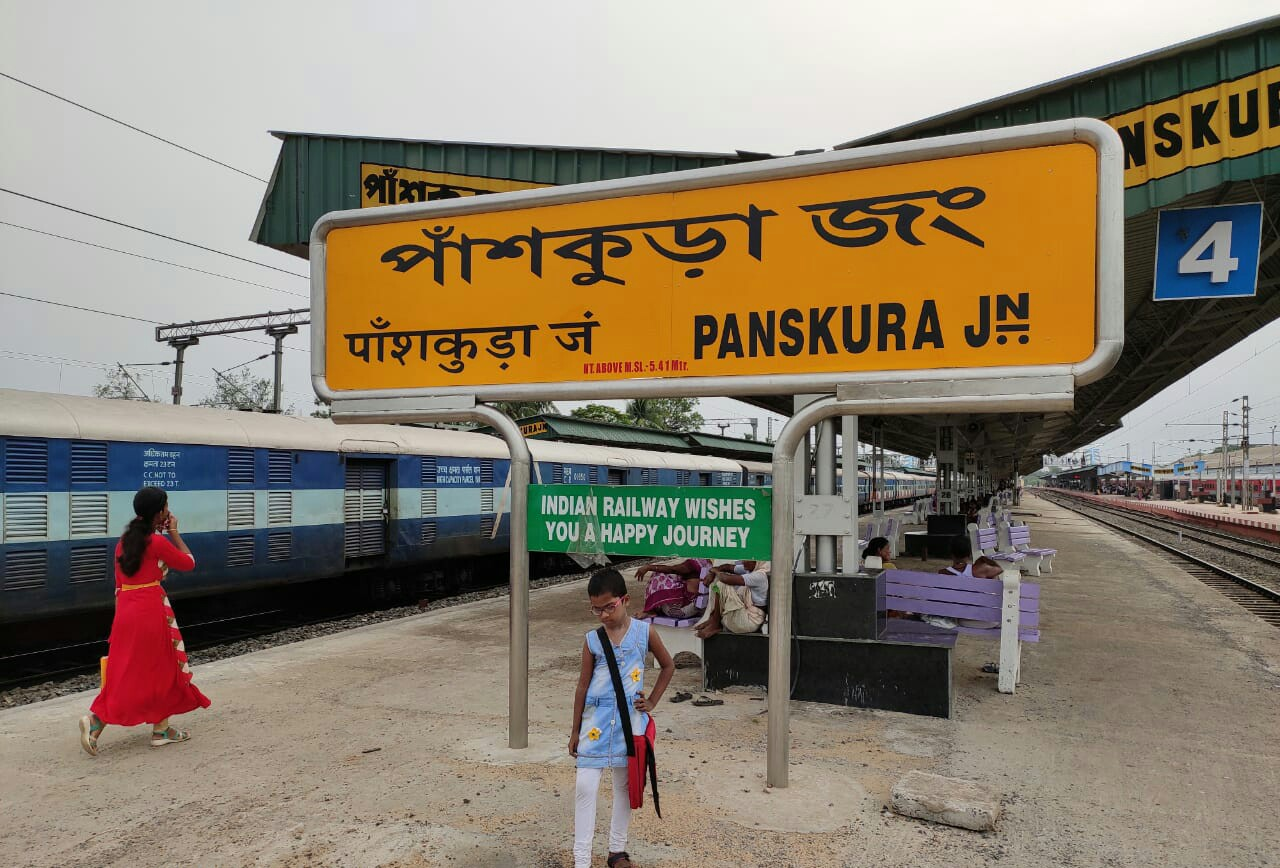
- Panskura Junction railway station,

General information
- Location: Panskura Station Road, Panskura, India
- Coordinates: 22°23′34″N 87°44′34″E
- Elevation: 9 metres (30 ft)
- System: Kolkata Suburban Railway station
- Owner: Indian Railways
- Operator: South Eastern Railway
- Line: Howrah–Kharagpur line
- Platforms: 6

Construction
- Structure type: At grade
- Parking: Yes
- Cycle facilities: Yes

Other information
- Status: Functioning
- Station code: PKU
- Zone(s): South Eastern Railway
- Division(s): Kharagpur

History
- Opened: 1900
- Electrified: 1967–69
- Former names: Bengal Nagpur Railway

Services
Preceding station	Kolkata Suburban Railway	Following station
Khirai towards Midnapore	South Eastern Line Main line	Narayan Pakuria Murail towards Howrah Junction
Raghunathbari towards Haldia	South Eastern Line Pakuria–Haldia branch line	Narayan Pakuria Murail towards Howrah Junction
Route map
Location
- Location within West Bengal Location within India

Panskura Junction is a railway junction station on the Howrah–Kharagpur line and is located in Purba Medinipur district in the Indian state of West Bengal. It serves Panskura.

== History ==
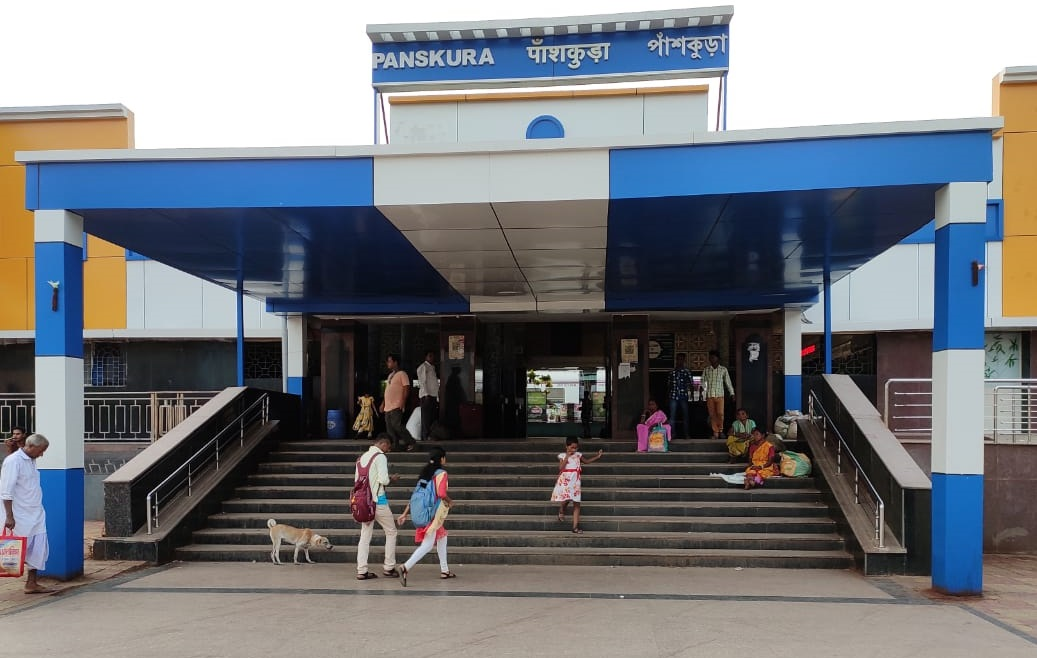
Panskura Junction railway station

The Howrah–Kharagpur line was opened in 1900.

The Panskura–Durgachak line was opened in 1968, at a time when Haldia Port was being constructed. It was subsequently extended to Haldia.

== Electrification ==
The Howrah–Kharagpur line was electrified in 1967–69. The Panskura–Haldia line was electrified in 1974–76.

== Car shed ==
There is a car shed of South Eastern Railway at Panskura.

== Railway Park ==
Panskura Junction railway station has a park where there is equipment for children to play in the station area.

== Facilities ==
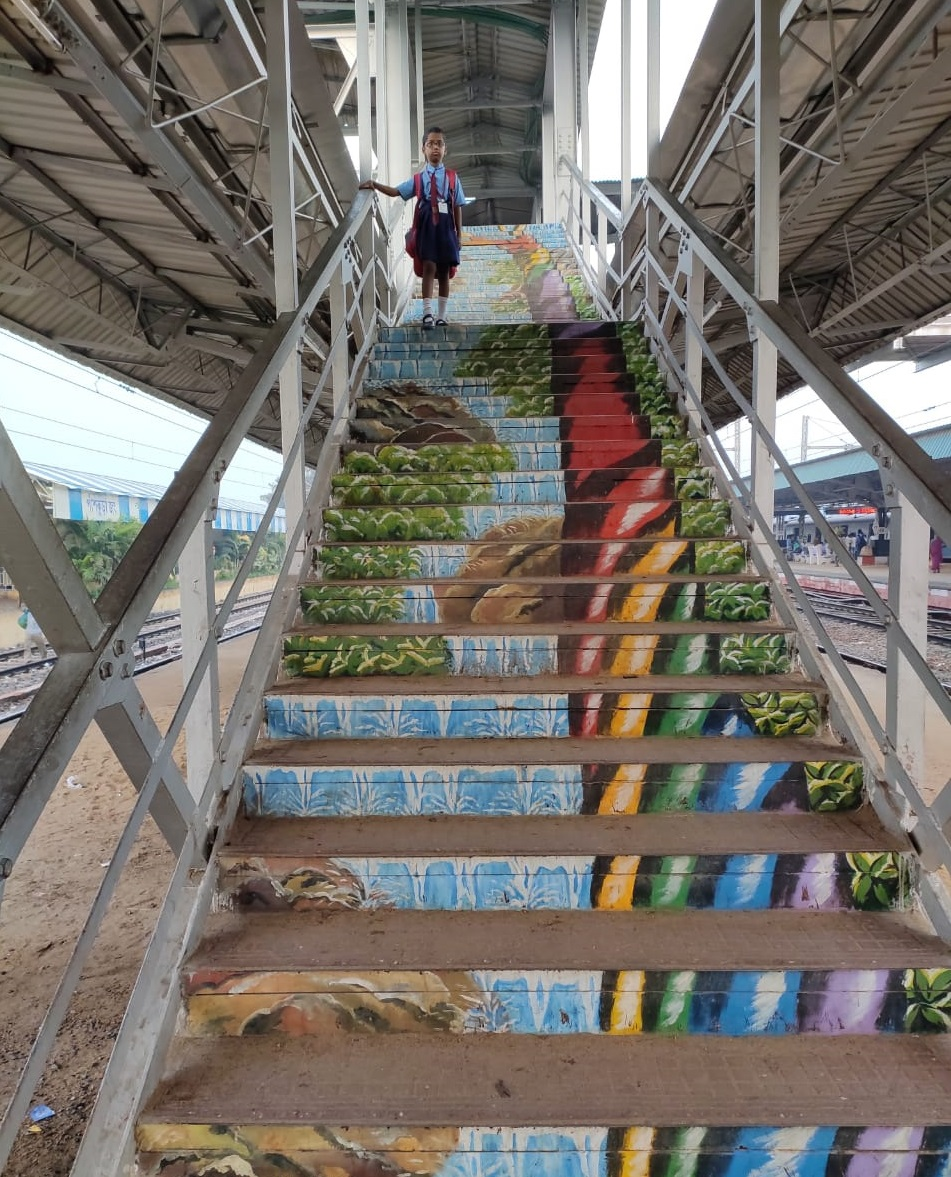
Panskura Junction foot overbridge

The major facilities available are First class and Second class waiting rooms, running rooms, computerised reservation facilities, reservation counters, vehicle parking, etc. There are tea stalls, a R.M.S. and a Government Railway police (GRP) office. Automatic ticket vending machines are installed to reduce the queue for train tickets in the station.

== Platforms ==
There are six platforms in Panskura Junction railway station. The platforms are interconnected with a foot overbridge(FOB). The ruins of the historic cities of Tamluk and Raghunathbari are approachable from Panskura Junction railway station.
