= Uluberia =

- City
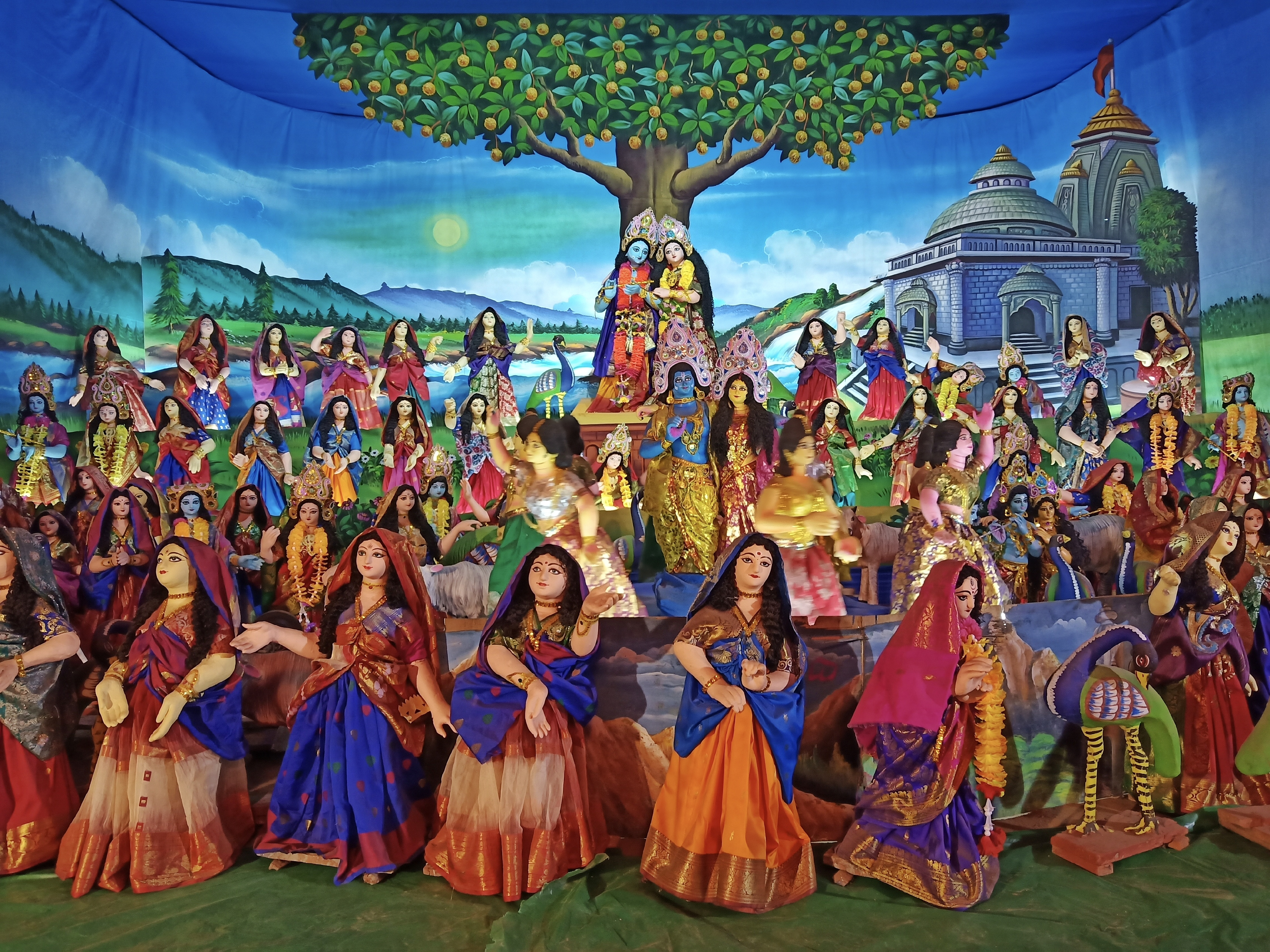
- Raasyatra Festival, Uluberia

- Location in West Bengal, India Uluberia (India)
- Coordinates: 22.47°N 88.11°E
- Country: India
- State: West Bengal
- Division: Presidency
- District: Howrah

Government
  - Type: Municipality
  - Body: Uluberia Municipality

Area
  - Total: 34.10 km^{2} (13.17 sq mi)
- Elevation: 1 m (3.3 ft)

Population (2011)
  - Total: 222,240
  - Density: 6,517/km^{2} (16,880/sq mi)

Languages
  - Official: Bengali, English
- Time zone: UTC+5:30 (IST)
- Telephone code: +91 033
- Vehicle registration: WB
- Lok Sabha constituency: Uluberia
- Vidhan Sabha constituency: Uluberia Purba
- Website: uluberiamunicipality.org

Uluberia is a city and a municipality of Howrah district in the Indian state of West Bengal. It is the headquarter of the Uluberia subdivision. It is a part of the area covered by Kolkata Metropolitan Development Authority (KMDA).

== History ==
In 1687, Uluberia, which was a scanty hamlet of a group of houses, served as a refuge for the retreating British Army after they were defeated by Shaista Khan near Hooghly. In Gadiara, the confluence of Hooghly, Damodar and Rupnarayan, Robert Clive commissioned the construction of Fort Mornington in Gadiara. Around late 1760s, it was completely built. It served as an important post of British dominance and prevention of piracy up in the Ganges. In 1873 the present Uluberia subdivision was constituted in the name of “Mahishrekha” which was subsequently renamed as Uluberia in 1882. Two years before the administration of subdivision was consolidated (1871), the British launched a massive Orisha Canal Scheme to provide irrigation facilities. A few years later, to save water utility costs, the canal passing through Uluberia and other areas of South Bengal was detached from the main canal and named Midnapore Canal. William Carey (missionary) , the famous Baptist visited Uluberia several times during late 19th century. During 1930s, Civil disobedience movement, there was huge uprising in Shyampur police station. After becoming congress president Subhas Chandra Bose gave speech in Gorur Hat of Uluberia in 1938. During WW2, Uluberia frequently faced blackouts due to Japanese bombing around areas near Kolkata . To facilitate troops movement towards east, especially from cities like Ranchi ( HQ of XV Corps of British Indian Army ), the famous Military Bridge was constructed on the Canal.

== Geography ==
Map of Howrah District

Uluberia is located at 22.47°N 88.11°E. It has an average elevation of 1 m (3.3 ft). It is situated on the banks of the river Hooghly. The main road passing through the heart of the city is Orissa trunk road and is also well connected by National Highway 16. This is an unplanned city hence waterlogging is very common during heavy rainfall. One of the other problems is erosion of the Hooghly River and encroachment of land.

=== Climate ===
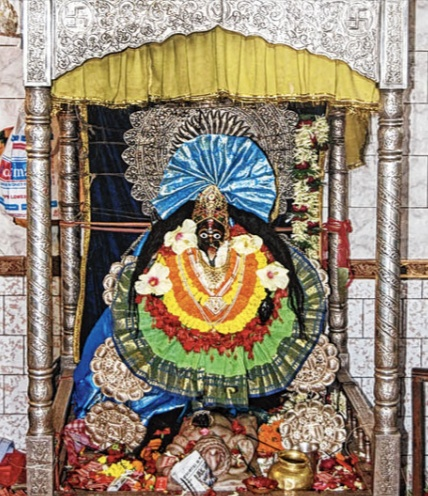
Anandamayee Kalimata, Uluberia

Climate data for Uluberia (1981–2010, extremes 1970–2012)
Month	Jan	Feb	Mar	Apr	May	Jun	Jul	Aug	Sep	Oct	Nov	Dec	Year
Record high °C (°F)	33.2 (91.8)	36.4 (97.5)	40.3 (104.5)	41.0 (105.8)	43.5 (110.3)	43.3 (109.9)	38.8 (101.8)	35.8 (96.4)	38.4 (101.1)	37.7 (99.9)	40.5 (104.9)	33.8 (92.8)	43.5 (110.3)
Mean daily maximum °C (°F)	24.6 (76.3)	28.0 (82.4)	31.9 (89.4)	34.0 (93.2)	34.2 (93.6)	33.0 (91.4)	31.8 (89.2)	31.5 (88.7)	31.5 (88.7)	30.9 (87.6)	28.4 (83.1)	25.8 (78.4)	30.5 (86.9)
Mean daily minimum °C (°F)	12.5 (54.5)	16.3 (61.3)	20.7 (69.3)	23.9 (75.0)	25.2 (77.4)	25.9 (78.6)	26.0 (78.8)	26.1 (79.0)	25.7 (78.3)	23.7 (74.7)	18.3 (64.9)	13.9 (57.0)	21.5 (70.7)
Record low °C (°F)	7.2 (45.0)	6.6 (43.9)	10.8 (51.4)	13.7 (56.7)	16.7 (62.1)	19.6 (67.3)	20.7 (69.3)	16.7 (62.1)	20.8 (69.4)	18.6 (65.5)	10.4 (50.7)	9.3 (48.7)	6.6 (43.9)
Average rainfall mm (inches)	10.6 (0.42)	19.7 (0.78)	31.9 (1.26)	50.9 (2.00)	115.8 (4.56)	246.2 (9.69)	367.4 (14.46)	308.2 (12.13)	288.0 (11.34)	137.1 (5.40)	33.4 (1.31)	6.6 (0.26)	1,615.6 (63.61)
Average rainy days	1.0	1.5	1.8	3.4	6.1	11.6	15.8	15.6	12.5	6.5	1.5	0.5	77.9
Average relative humidity (%) (at 17:30 IST)	64	61	62	73	75	81	84	85	84	79	72	66	74
Source: India Meteorological Department

== Civic administration ==
The Uluberia Municipality was formed in 22 September 1982 with an area of 33.72sqkm and 28 wards, now it has expanded to 34.10sqkm and 32 wards.

== Demographics ==
As of 2011 India census, As per provisional reports of Census India, population of Uluberia in 2011 is 222,240; of which male and female are 113,923 and 108,317 respectively. Although Uluberia city has population of 222,240; its urban / metropolitan population is 14,035,959 of which 7,251,908 are males and 6,784,051 are females, with a sex Ratio of 951 and average literacy of 80.54%. The Percentage of population of children have increased from 6% in 2001 to 11.8% in 2011 and child sex ratio is 956.

With the partition of India in 1947 came a significant number of refugees from East Pakistan, who mainly settled in Kolkata and its outlying areas, forming colonies on the banks of the Hooghly River, including near Uluberia on the west bank.

=== Religion ===
The population of Uluberia is divided between Hinduism and Islam, each comprising approximately 49.83% of the population. Additionally, there are smaller religious communities such as Christianity at 0.11%, Buddhism and Sikhism at 0.03% each, with other religions collectively making up 0.3% of the population.

== Economy ==
Uluberia is an industrial town.It was a major jute processing town during the colonial and post Independence era but slowly the jute industry declined and now there is no big jute mill in Uluberia. In 2006 the Salim Group of Indonesia planned to invest $250 million in a motorcycle factory.

== Industrial park ==
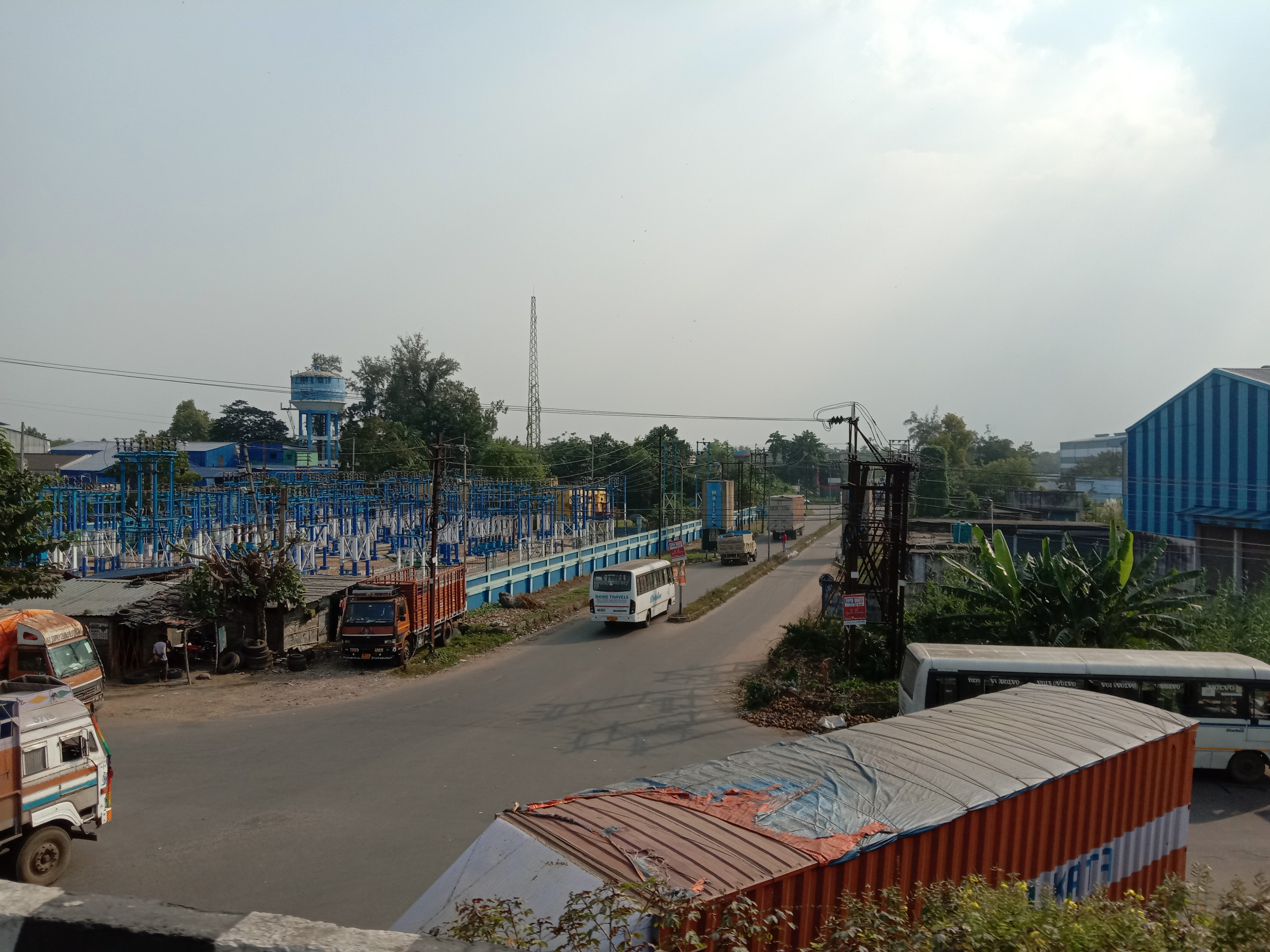
West Bengal Industrial Infrastructure Development Corporation (WBIIDC) in Uluberia

There exist about 70 industrial units in Uluberia Industrial Park. The Industrial Park is providing lease holding to various industrial units and institutions for setting up their plants with Building Plan approved by the WBIIDC itself. There exist two large water bodies inside the campus are breathing spaces for the zone. Some of the prominent industrial units are: 1) Ceratizit India Private Limited. 2) Saj Industries Pvt (Biskfarm). 3) Sintex Industries Ltd. 4) Goel Alloy & Steel Pvt. Ltd.

== Healthcare ==
The healthcare of Uluberia is mainly dominated by the small private hospitals other than that, there are a number of government hospitals in the city like the Uluberia hospital, E.S.I Hospital, Uluberia Sub-divisional hospital. Few popular private hospitals are Sebarata Hospital and Sanjiban Hospital.

== Education ==
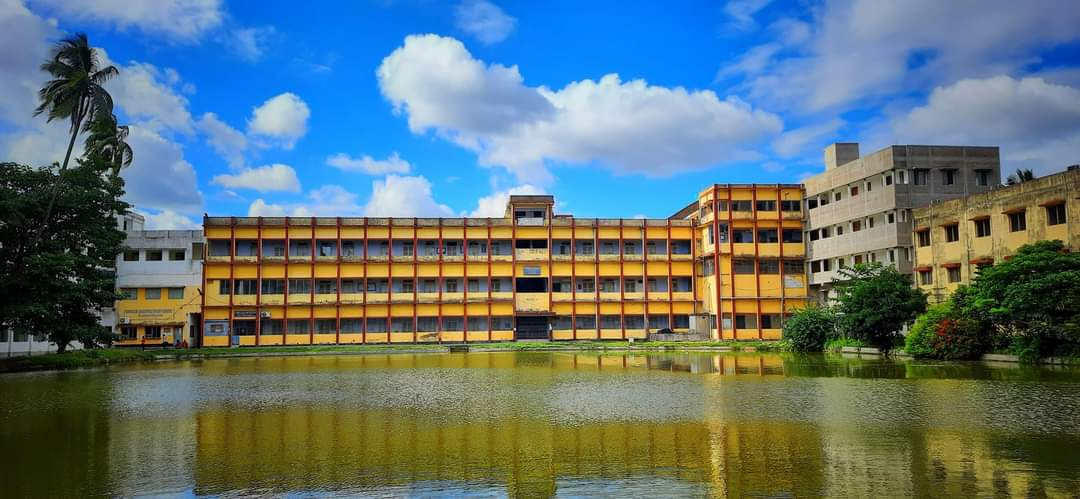
Uluberia College

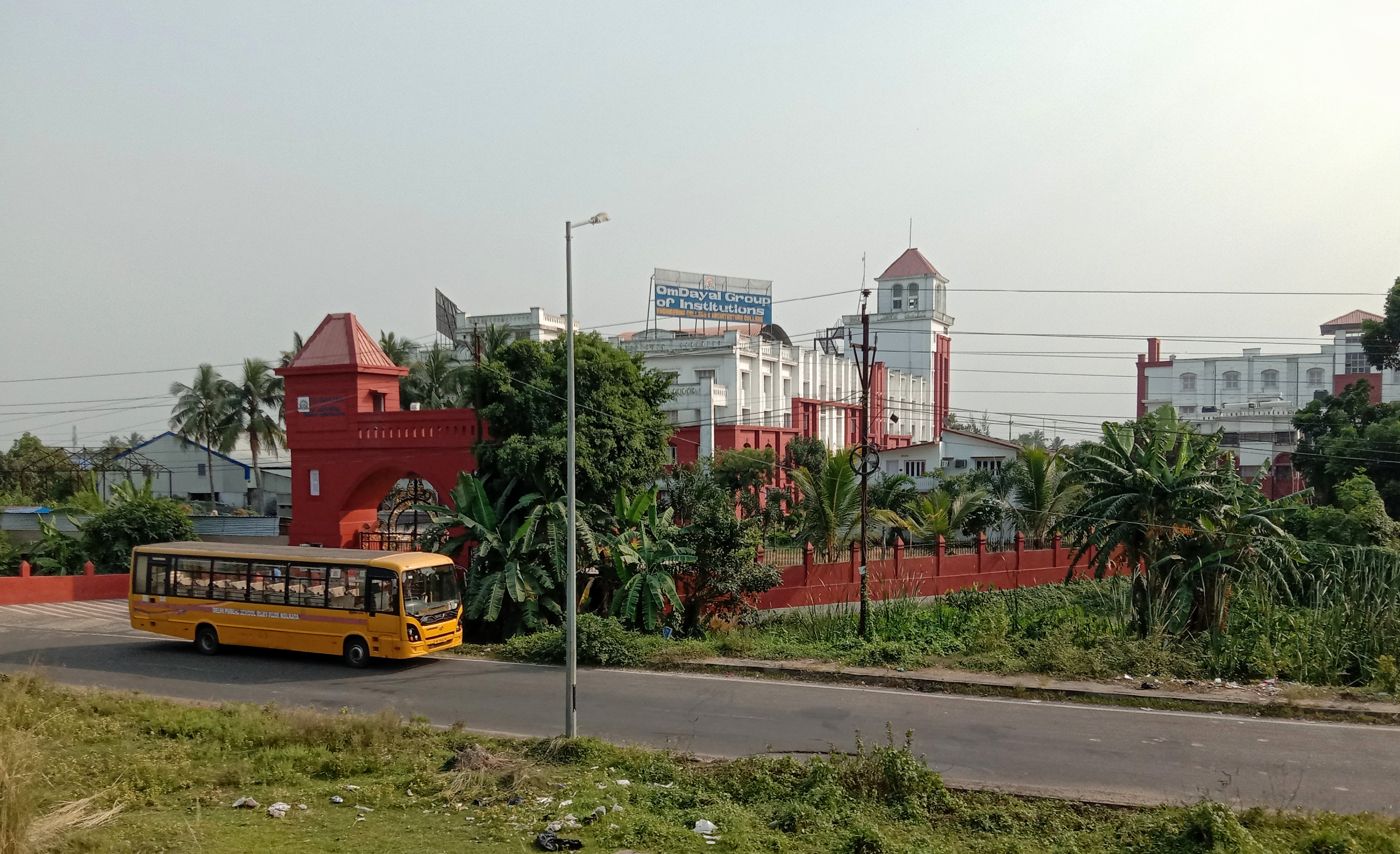
Om Dayal Group of Institutions in Uluberia

Before LPG reforms the education sector was mainly dominated by the public institutions but now many private schools have been built. The oldest college in Uluberia is the Uluberia College (founded in 1948) and other colleges are Om Dayal Group of Institutions, Bharat Technology, Calcutta institute of technology, Calcutta Institute of Pharmaceutical Technology and allied health sciences and Panchla Maha Vidyalaya. There is ESI Hospital at Nimdighi in Uluberia. A new Medical College named "Sarat Chandra Chattopadhyay Government Medical College and Hospital" has been established and started since 2022. An International Herbarium with Acronym "UBIH" (Uluberia Botanical Institute Herbarium) has been affiliated by NEW YORK BOTANICAL GARDEN and enlisted in "Index Herbariorum". It is under the supervision of the most renowned Environmental Research Centre "Uluberia Botanical Institute", The Registered N.G.O. since 2004.

== Transport ==
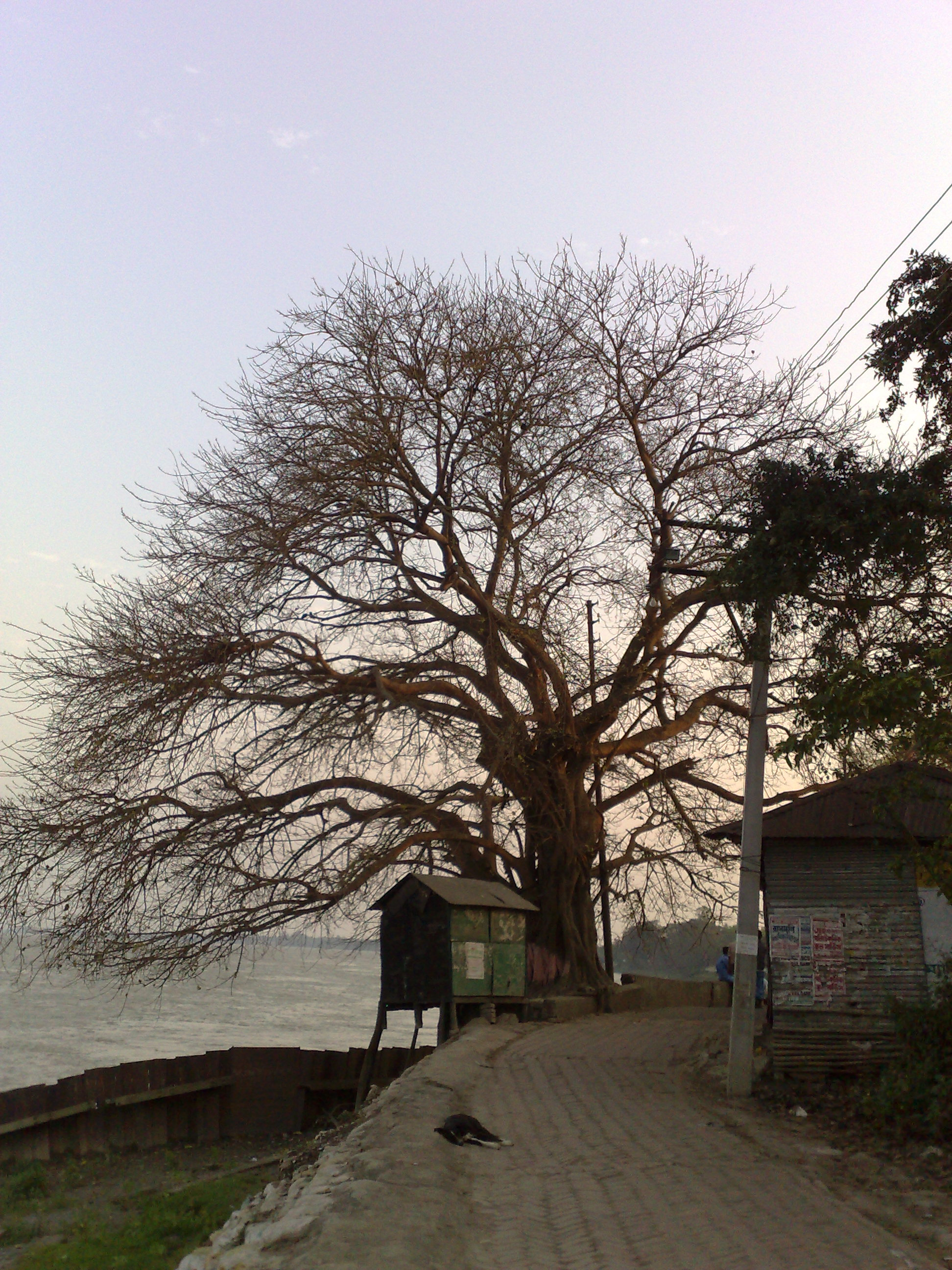
West Bank of Hooghly River in Uluberia

This city has National Highway 16, South Eastern Railway zone and Cuttack Road pass through it. The Hooghly River surrounds the south part of this town. There is also ferry service from Uluberia to Budge Budge and other towns of Howrah and South 24 Parganas. The town is served by Uluberia railway station. The rapid growth of this city in past few decades have caused bottlenecks in the traffic flow of the city, the station Road, the Odisha trunk and the road connecting Uluberia court and Uluberia Kalibari is highly congested in the peak hours.
