= Ramnagar, Purba Medinipur =

Ramnagar
- Township
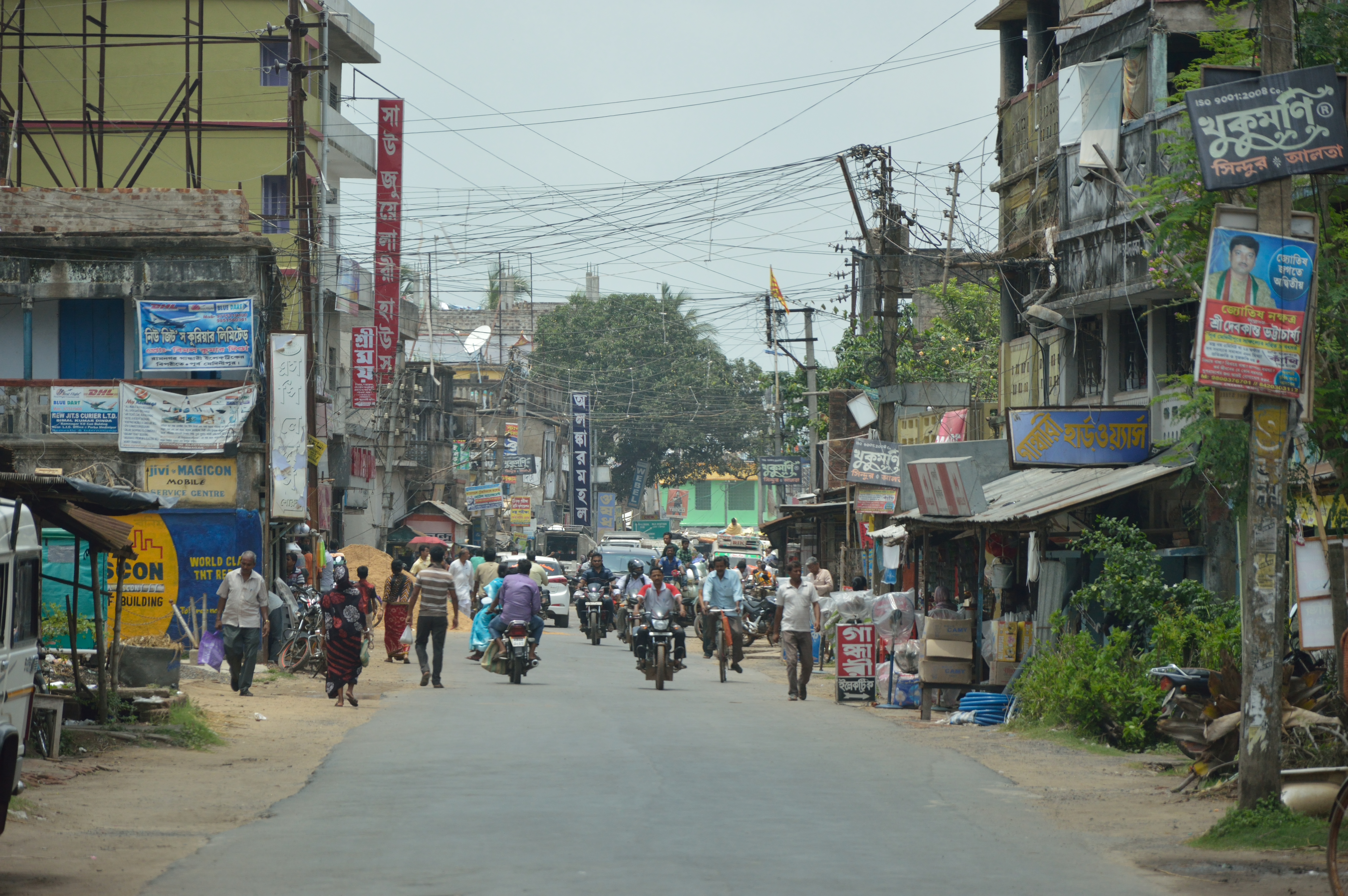

- Location in West Bengal, India Ramnagar (India)
- Coordinates: 21°40′43.0″N 87°33′33.1″E
- Country: India
- State: West Bengal
- District: Purba Medinipur

Population (2011)
  - Total: 1,914

Languages
  - Official: Bengali, English
- Time zone: UTC+5:30 (IST)
- PIN: 721441 (Ramnagar)
- Telephone/STD code: 03229
- Lok Sabha constituency: Kanthi
- Vidhan Sabha constituency: Ramnagar
- Website: purbamedinipur.gov.in

Ramnagar is a Township Area in Ramnagar I CD block in Contai subdivision of Purba Medinipur district, in the state of West Bengal, India.

== Geography ==
Cities and towns in Contai subdivision of Purba Medinipur district
M: municipal city/ town, CT: census town, R: rural/ urban centre, H: historical/ religious centre, S: port, sea-beach
Owing to space constraints in the small map, the actual locations in a larger map may vary slightly

=== CD block HQ ===
The headquarters of Ramnagar I CD block are located at Ramnagar.

=== Police station ===
Ramnagar police station is located at Talgachari. It has jurisdiction over Ramnagar I (part) and Ramnagar II CD blocks. It covers an area of 286.02 km^{2} with a population of 309,836.

=== Urbanisation ===
93.55% of the population of Contai subdivision live in the rural areas. Only 6.45% of the population live in the urban areas and it is considerably behind Haldia subdivision in urbanization, where 20.81% of the population live in urban areas.

Note: The map alongside presents some of the notable locations in the subdivision. All places marked in the map are linked in the larger full screen map.

== Demographics ==
As per 2011 Census of India Ramnagar had a total population of 1,914 of which 964 (50%) were males and 950 (50%) were females. Population below 6 years was 196. The total number of literates in Ramnagar was 1,580 (91.97% of the population over 6 years).

== Transport ==
SH 4 connecting Jhalda (in Purulia district) and Digha (in Purba Medinipur district) passes through Ramnagar. Egra-Ramnagar Road meets SH 4 at Ramnagar.

Ramnagar (Bengal) railway station is the nearest railway station on the Tamluk-Digha line,
