= Kharagpur railway division =

Railway division of India

Kharagpur railway division is one of the four railway divisions under the jurisdiction of South Eastern Railway zone of the Indian Railways. This railway division was formed on 14 April 1952 and its headquarters are located at Kharagpur in the state of West Bengal of India.

The division has a number of railway lines under it, which extend in many directions.
1. From Tikiapara in West Bengal to Rakha Mines in Jharkhand on the Howrah Mumbai Main Line. It consists of main stations like Kharagpur, Santragachi, Mecheda, Panskura, Jhargram and Ghatshila .
2. From Panskura to Haldia in West Bengal. This line consists of important stations like Tamluk.
3. From Tamluk to Digha in West Bengal.
4. From Kharagpur in West Bengal to Ranital Link Cabin in Odisha. This line consists of important stations like Jaleswar, Balasore and Soro.
5. From Rupsa to Bangriposi branch line in Odisha which was earlier a narrow gauge line.
6. From Kharagpur to Medinipur on Kharagpur - Adra line in West Bengal.
7. From Santragachi to Shalimar branch line in West Bengal.
8. From Baltikuri Cabin to Amta in West Bengal.
9. From Andul and Santragachi to Bankranayabaz via Maurigram Flyover in West Bengal.
10. From Balasore to Gopinathpur Nilagiri in Odisha.

Adra railway division, Chakradharpur railway division and Ranchi railway division are the other three railway divisions under SER Zone headquartered at Kolkata.

== List of railway stations and towns ==
The list includes the stations under the Kharagpur railway division and their station category.

Category of station	No. of stations	Names of stations
A-1	1	Kharagpur Junction
A	4	Balasore, Digha, Shalimar, Santragachi
B	10	Panskura Junction, Tamluk Junction, Uluberia, Mecheda, Haldia , Midnapore, Amta, Hijli, Bagnan, Jhargram
C	40	suburban stations
D	7	Belda, Ghatshila, Chakulia, Rupsa Junction, Jaleswar, Baripada, Kanthi
E	-	-
F	-	halt stations
Total	-	-

Stations closed for Passengers -
