= Digha railway station =

Railway station in West Bengal, India

Digha
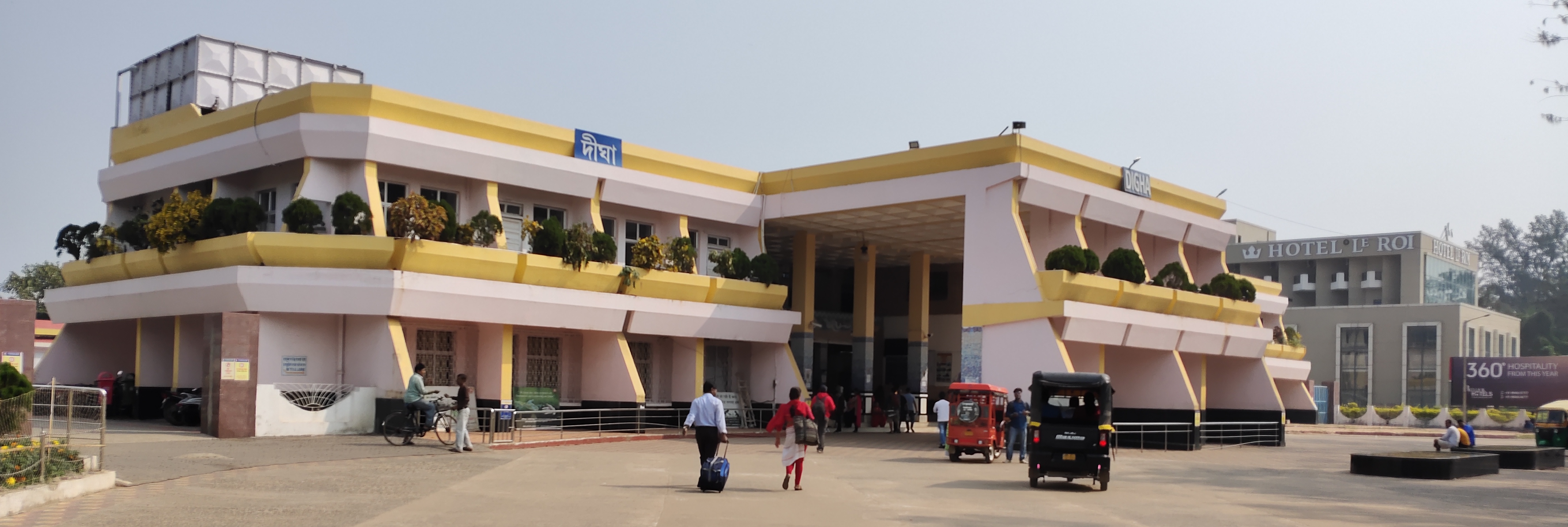
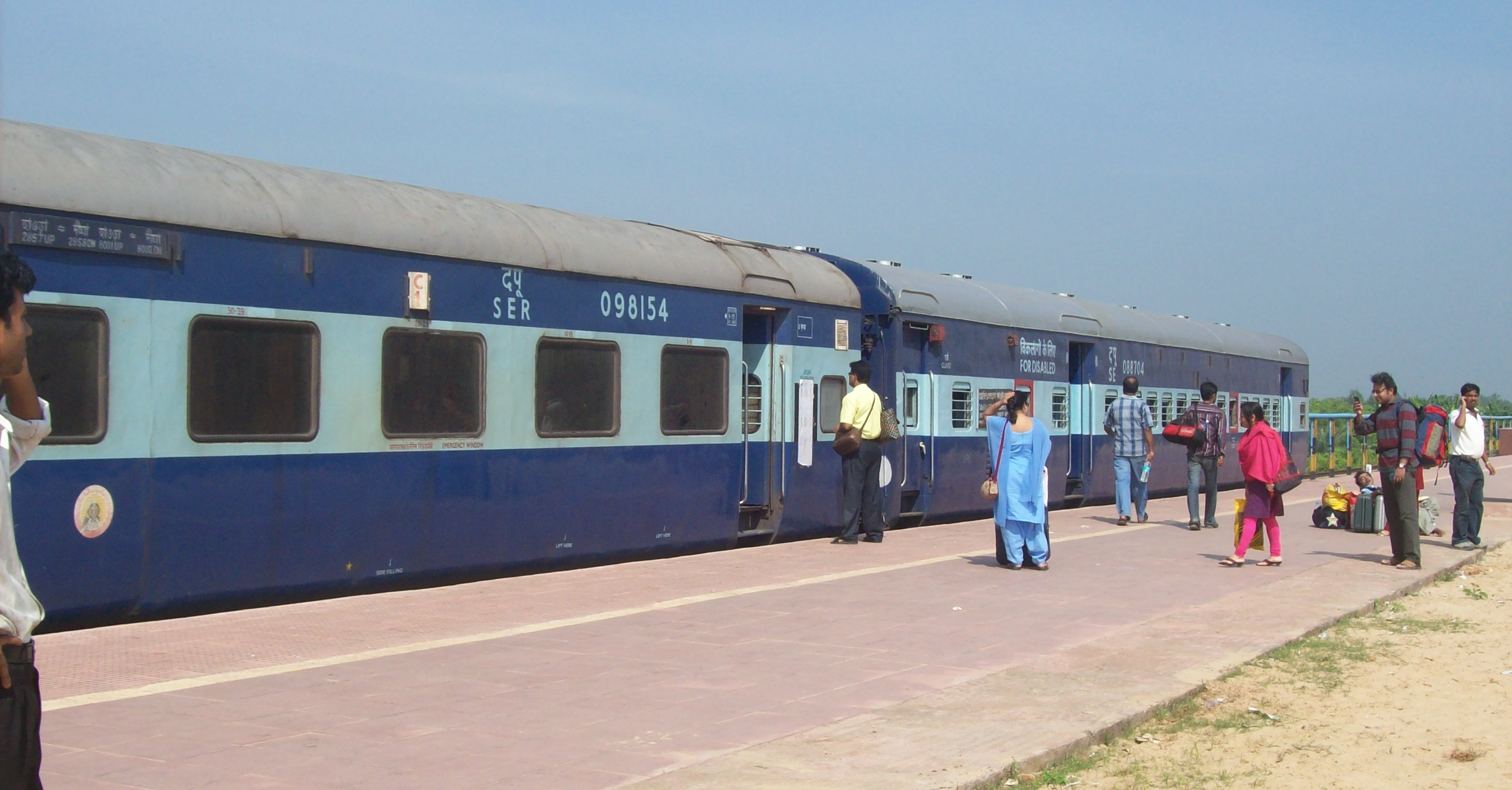
- Digha railway station, West Bengal Express Train at Digha Station

General information
- Location: Digha–Chandaneshwar Road, Digha, Purba Medinipur; India
- Coordinates: 21°37′24″N 87°30′30″E
- Elevation: 7.400 metres (24.28 ft)
- System: Kolkata Suburban Railway station
- Owner: Indian Railways
- Operator: South Eastern Railway
- Line: Tamluk–Digha branch line
- Platforms: 3
- Tracks: 4

Construction
- Structure type: At grade
- Parking: Yes
- Cycle facilities: yes

Other information
- Status: Functioning
- Station code: DGHA
- Zone(s): South Eastern Railway
- Division(s): Kharagpur

History
- Opened: 1992
- Rebuilt: 2002
- Former names: Digha Railway Junction

Services
Preceding station	Kolkata Suburban Railway	Following station
Terminus	South Eastern Line Tamluk–Digha branch line	Tikra towards Howrah Junction
Route map
Location
- Location within West Bengal Location within India

Digha is a terminal railway station on the Tamluk–Digha branch line and is located in Purba Medinipur district in the Indian state of West Bengal. It serves Digha sea-side area. The railway station is near New Digha beach.

== History ==
The Panskura–Durgachak line was opened in 1968, at a time when Haldia Port was being constructed. It was subsequently extended to Haldia.

The Tamluk–Digha line was sanctioned in 1984–85 Railway Budget at an estimated cost of around Rs 74 crore. Finally this line was opened in 2004. This track was electrified in 2012–13.

== New line ==
It's been proposed to connect Digha to Jaleswar via the Kharagpur–Puri line.

== Digha Railway Station Picture Gallery ==
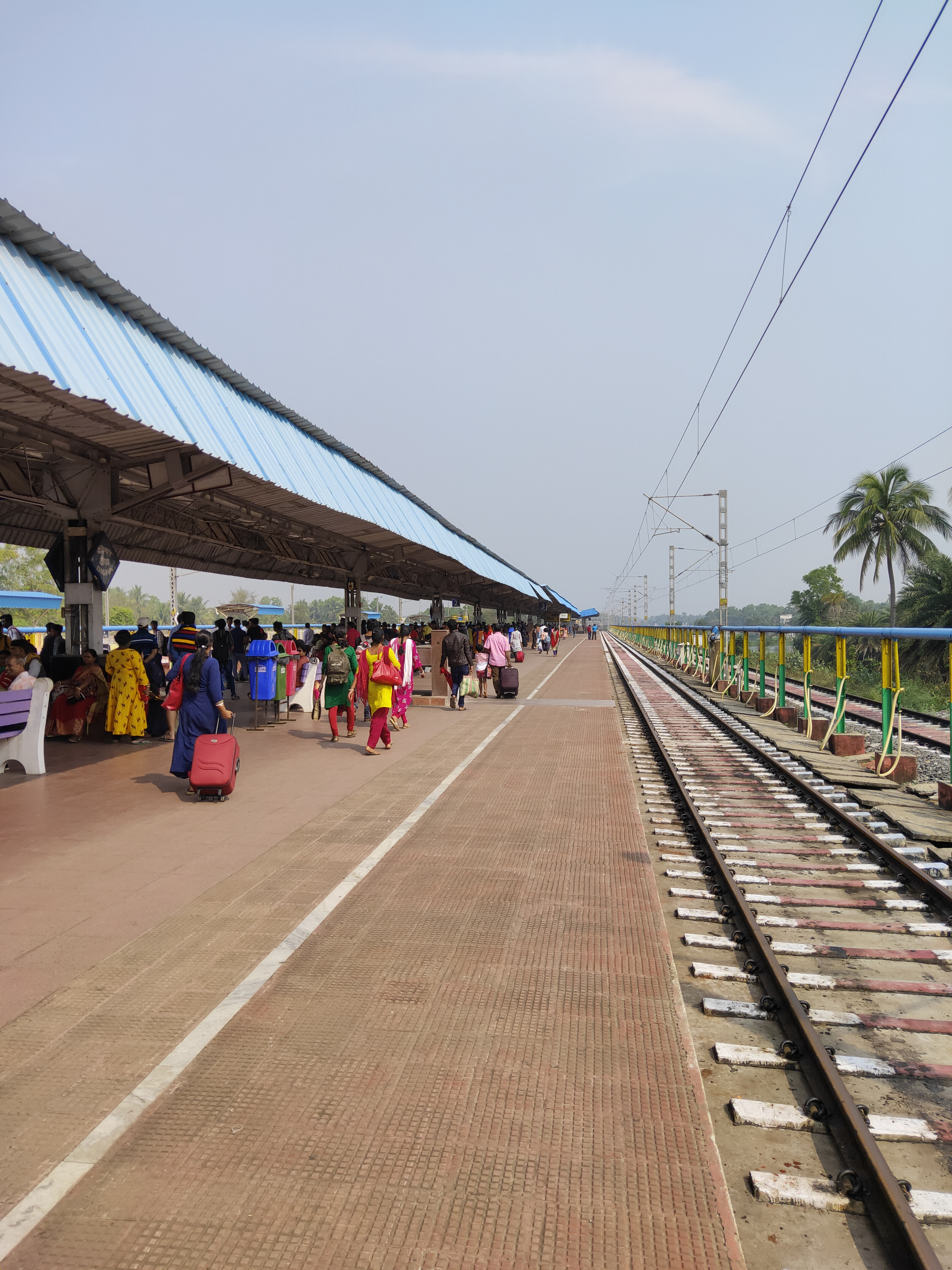
Digha Railway Station, West Bengal

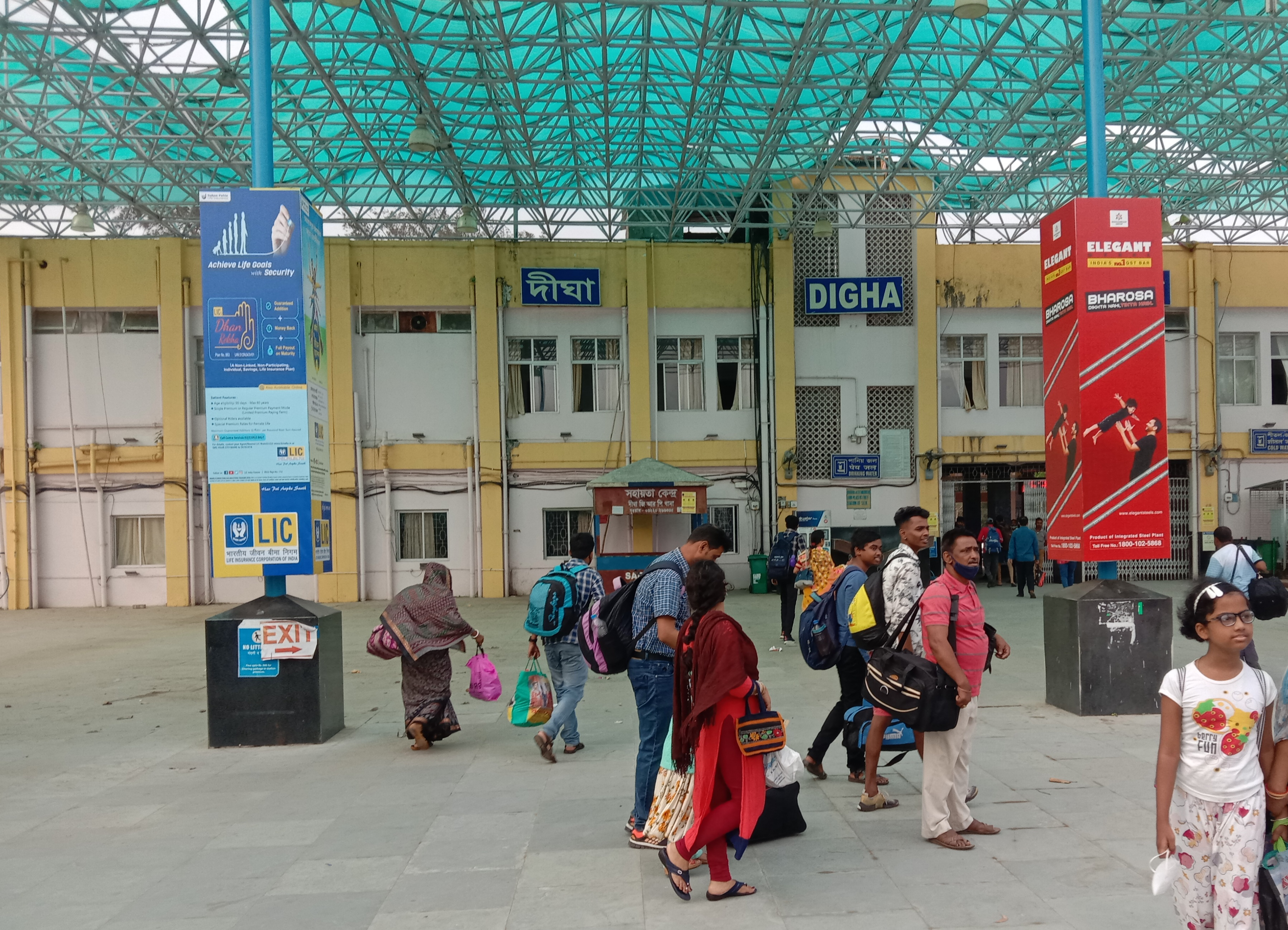
Digha Railway Station Innerside
