= Howrah–Kharagpur line =

Railway Route in West Bengal, India

Howrah–Kharagpur line (including Tamluk-Digha & Tamluk-Haldia branch lines)
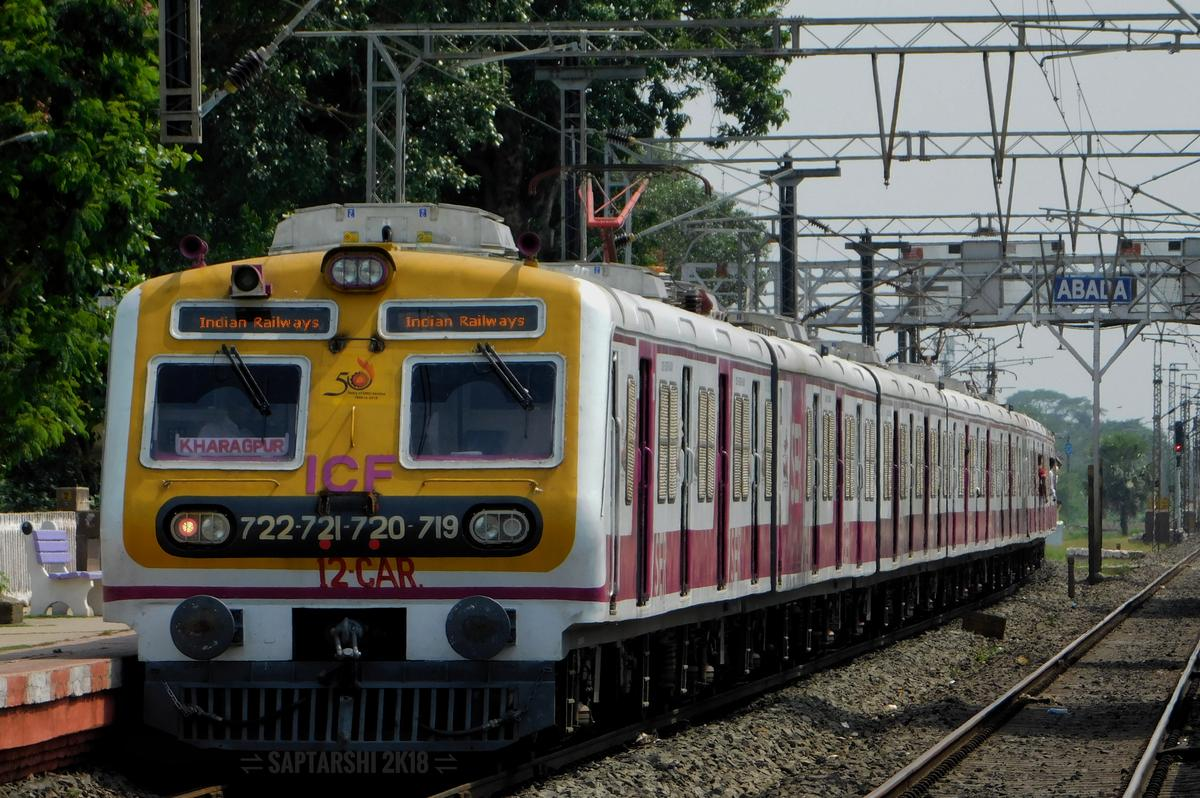
- EMU train running on Howrah–Kharagpur line

Overview
- Status: Operational
- Owner: Indian Railways
- Locale: West Bengal
- Termini: Howrah; Kharagpur

Service
- System: Kolkata Suburban Railway
- Services: Howrah–Nagpur–Mumbai line and Howrah–Chennai main line, Kolkata Suburban Railway
- Operator: South Eastern Railway
- Depot(s): Tikiapara, Santragachi, Panskura, Kharagpur
- Daily ridership: 1 Million Approx

History
- Opened: 1900

Technical
- Track length: Main line: 115 km (71 mi); Branch lines: Panskura–Haldia: 70 km (43 mi); Tamluk–Digha: 94 km (58 mi)
- Number of tracks: 3 (Howrah–Panskura), 3 (Panskura–Kharagpur), 2 (Panskura–Haldia), 1 (Tamluk–Digha)
- Track gauge: 5 ft 6 in (1,676 mm) broad gauge
- Electrification: Main line: 25 kV AC overhead system in 1967–69
- Operating speed: Main line: 130 km/h (81 mph) Branch line: 110 km/h (68 mph)

The Howrah–Kharagpur line is part of the Howrah–Nagpur–Mumbai line, Howrah–Chennai main line and Kolkata Suburban Railway.

== Geography ==
The line runs through the plains of West Bengal. From Howrah, it is first the Gangetic Plains and then the basins of the Damodar, Rupnarayan and Kangsabati, Haldi thereby traversing Howrah, Purba Medinipur and Paschim Medinipur districts.

Kolaghat Thermal Power Station, with its six tall chimneys, one for each of the 210 MW units, is a landmark on this line.

Haldia dock complex handled 31.015 million tonnes of traffic in 2011–12. Haldia Refinery, one of the eight operating refineries of Indian Oil Corporation, was commissioned in 1975. Haldia Petrochemicals, a modern naphtha based petrochemical complex and the second-largest project of its kind in India, has been a catalyst for the development of a large number of downstream industries.

== History ==
Bengal Nagpur Railway opened to traffic its main line from Nagpur to Asansol in 1891. Sini, on the Nagpur–Asansol line, was connected to Kharagpur and Kolaghat in 1898–99. The Kharagpur-Cuttack section was also opened the same year. The Kolaghat-Howrah track was completed in 1899–1900. Kharagpur was connected to Howrah with the opening of the Rupnarayan bridge on 19 April 1900.

The Panskura–Durgachak line was opened in 1968, at a time when Haldia Port was being constructed. It was subsequently extended to Haldia. Haldia Dock Complex, a part of Kolkata Port Trust, was commissioned in 1977.

The Tamluk–Digha line was opened in 2004.

=== Electrification ===
The Howrah–Kharagpur line was electrified in 1967–69. The Panskura–Haldia line was electrified in 1974–76. Santragachi–Bankaranayabaj sector was electrified in 1984–85. All lines were electrified with 25 kV AC overhead system. EMU train services between Panskura and Haldia introduced in 1976 and direct EMU services between Howrah and Haldia in 1979. The Tamluk–Digha line was sanctioned in 1984–85 Railway Budget at an estimated cost of around Rs 74 crore. Finally this line was opened in 2004. This track was electrified in 2012–13.

== New lines ==
Indian Railways propose to lay a new line connecting Sealdah and Haldia, with the distance being shorter by 70 km than the Howrah–Haldia track.

There is a plan to connect Digha to Jaleswar on the Kharagpur–Puri line.

The Howrah–Kharagpur stretch has three lines. There is a plan to build a fourth line for the Santragachi–Panskura–Kharagpur stretch. Also there is a plan to construct third line in Panskura–Haldia Section and fourth line in Panskura—Tamluk Section for better utilization of goods train from Haldia Port.

== Car and loco sheds ==
There are EMU car sheds at Tikiapara (for Howrah), Panskura and Kharagpur. Kharagpur has a diesel loco shed which houses WDM-2, WDM-3A and WDM-3B locos. Nimpura (for Kharagpur) has an electric loco shed. Santragachi has an electric loco shed and also an outstation trip shed. It houses WAP-4 and WAP-7 locos and can take in 50+ locos. Santragachi also has arrangements for rake maintenance. Kharagpur has workshops for loco, carriage and wagon overhaul.

== Speed limits ==
The main line is classified as a "Group A" line which can take speeds up to 160 km/h. The Panskura–Haldia line has a speed limit up to 130 km/h and Tamluk–Digha line has a speed limit up to 110 km/h.

== Railway reorganization ==
The Bengal Nagpur Railway was nationalized in 1944.Eastern Railway was formed on 14 April 1952 with the portion of East Indian Railway Company east of Mughalsarai and the Bengal Nagpur Railway. In 1955, South Eastern Railway was carved out of Eastern Railway. It comprised lines mostly operated by BNR earlier. Amongst the new zones started in April 2003 were East Coast Railway and South East Central Railway. Both these railways were carved out of South Eastern Railway.

== Passenger movement ==
Howrah, Shalimar and Kharagpur on this line, are amongst the top hundred booking stations of Indian Railway.
