= Dhirendra Narayan Roy =

Bengali doctor, independence activist and Raja of Tamluk Raj (1918-1977)

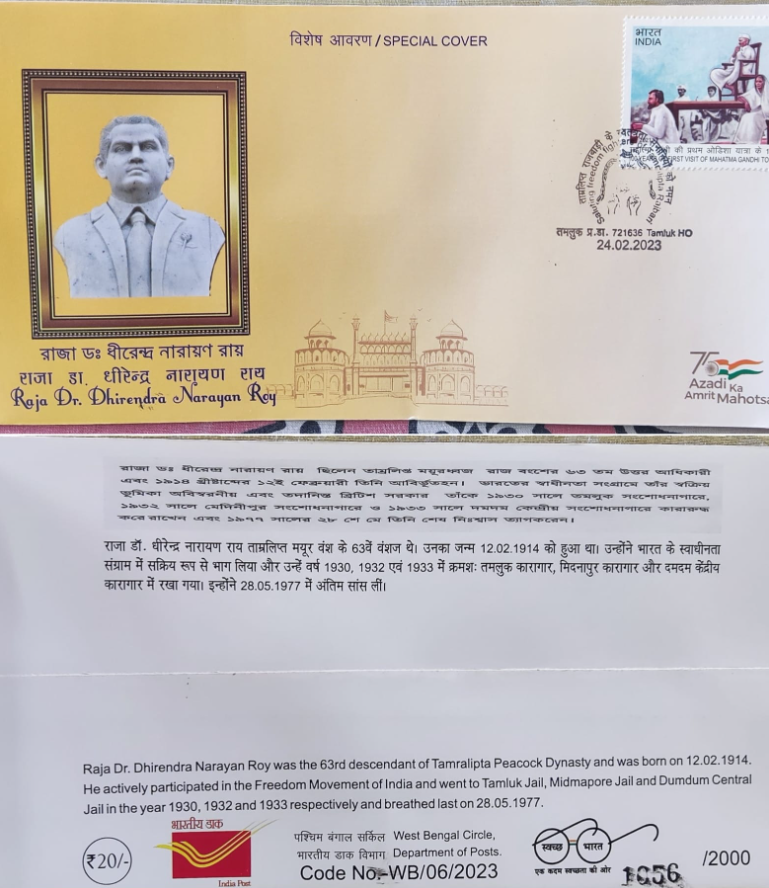
- Stamp released in the honour of Raja Dhirendra Narayan Roy
- Born: Dhirendra Narayan Roy; 11 February 1897; Tamluk, Midnapore district British India
- Died: 28 May 1977 (aged 59)
- Education: Medical College & Hospital, Kolkata
- Parents: Raja Surendra Narayan Roy (father); Rani Dakshayani Debi (mother)

Raja Dr. Dhirendra Narayan Roy, Lt Col (11 February 1918 – 28 May 1977) was an Indian Medical doctor, a Bengali aristocrat, politician, and military officer who was a notable figure in the Indian freedom struggle. He was a member of the Tamluk Raj family.

== Biography ==
He was born in 11 February, 1918 to Raja Surendra Narayan Roy, the 57th Raja of the Tamluk Raj and Dakshayani Debi at Tamluk. He was their 4th son.

From and early age he began to active participate in the Indian Freedom struggle, he first participated in the Labon Satyagraha, a part of the Civil disobedience of Mahatma Gandhi in 1930 when he was just 12 years old. He passed matriculation in 1934 from the famed Tamluk Hamilton School and then proceeded to the Medical College at Calcutta. He completed his MBBS in 1942, and joined the Indian Army as a Captain. He served in the post till 1947 before setting sail for London. While at the United Kingdom, he developed cordial relationship with the Royal family.

He later sailed for London to get higher education in Medicine. He was arrested twice before he set sail for London for his association with the revolutionaries of Medinipur. e worked alongside luminaries like Satish Chandra Samanta and Sushil Kumar Dhara during the formation of the Tamralipta Jatiyo Sarkar.

After his return in 1950, he rejoined the Army, being promoted to the rank of Lieutenant colonel, before permanently retiring after two years. He opened his own chambers by the name of "Surgical Hall", where he treated the impoverished for free.
