= Sahid Matangini railway station =

Railway station in West Bengal, India

Sahid Matangini
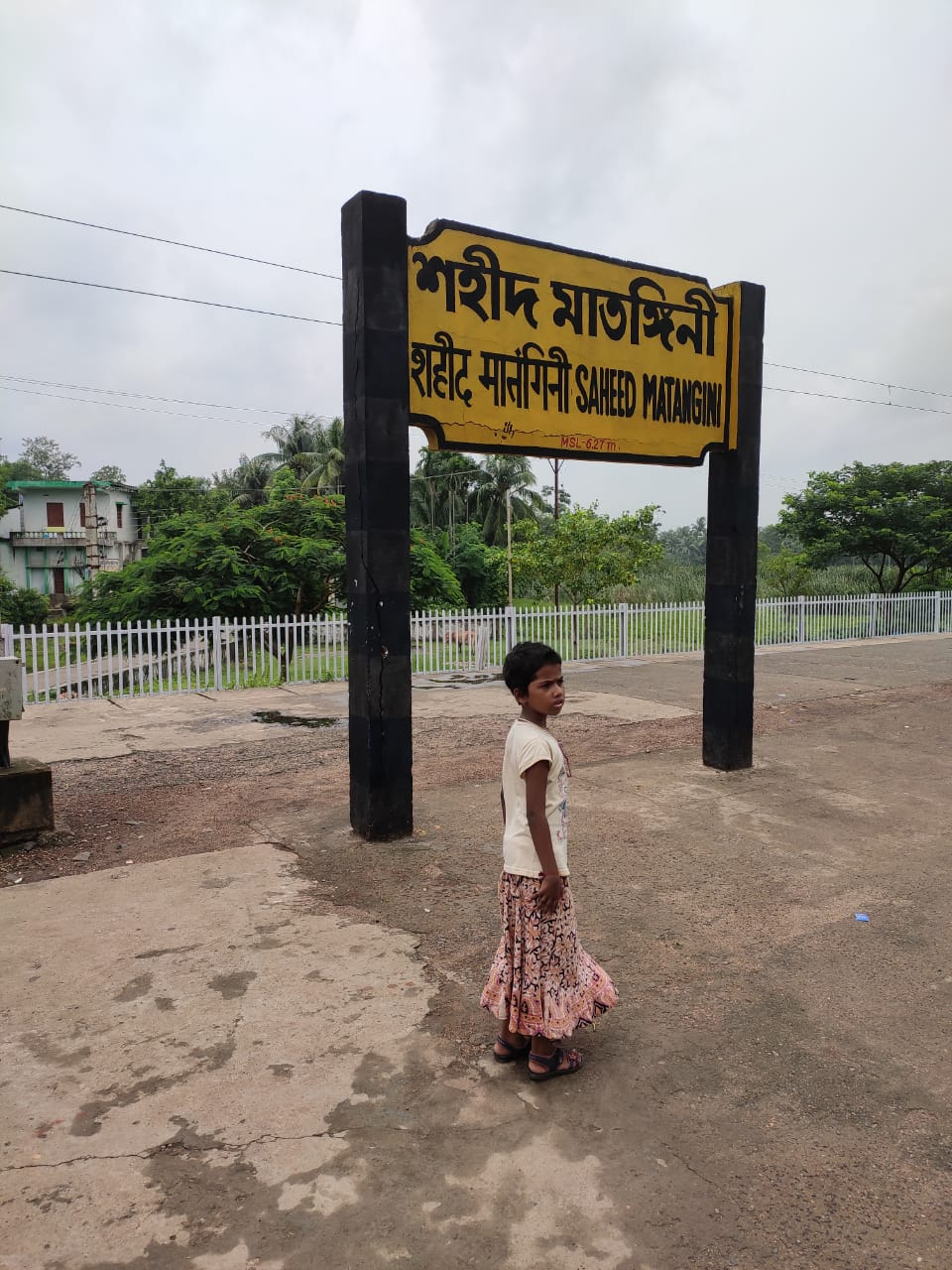
- Sahid Matangini Railway Station

General information
- Location: Tamluk-Panskura Road, Tamluk, Purba Medinipur district, West Bengal; India
- Coordinates: 22°18′02″N 87°54′31″E
- Elevation: 6 metres (20 ft)
- System: Kolkata Suburban Railway station
- Owner: Indian Railways
- Line: Panskura–Haldia line
- Platforms: 2

Construction
- Structure type: Standard on-ground station
- Parking: No
- Cycle facilities: yes

Other information
- Station code: SMTG
- Fare zone: South Eastern Railway

History
- Opened: 1968
- Electrified: 1974–76

Services
Preceding station	Kolkata Suburban Railway	Following station
Tamluk Junction towards Haldia	South Eastern Line Panskura–Haldia line	Rajgoda towards Howrah Junction
Route map
Location
- Location within West Bengal

The Sahid Matangini railway station in the Indian state of West Bengal, serves Tamluk-Panskura Road, Tamluk, India in Purba Medinipur district. It is on the Panskura–Haldia line. It is 88 km (55 mi) from Howrah Station and 21 km (13 mi) from Panskura.. This station is named after Matangini Hazra, a Gandhian freedom activist. She was killed at the age of 72, near the nearby Tamluk police station while participating in the Quit India movement during India's struggle for freedom in 1942.

== History ==
Sahid Matangini railway station is situated in Tamluk-Panskura Road, Tamluk, West Bengal. Station code is SMTG. It is a small railway station between Howrah and Haldia. Neighbourhood stations are Rajgoda and Tamluk. Local EMU trains Haldia–Howrah Fast Local, Digha–Panskura local, Mecheda–Digha local, Haldia–Panskura local, Howrah–Haldia local train stop here. The Panskura–Durgachak line was opened in 1968, at a time when Haldia Port was being constructed. It was subsequently extended to Haldia. The Panskura–Haldia line was electrified in 1974–76. All lines were electrified with 25 kV AC overhead system. EMU train services between Panskura and Haldia introduced in 1976 and direct EMU services between Howrah and Haldia in 1979.

== Gallery ==
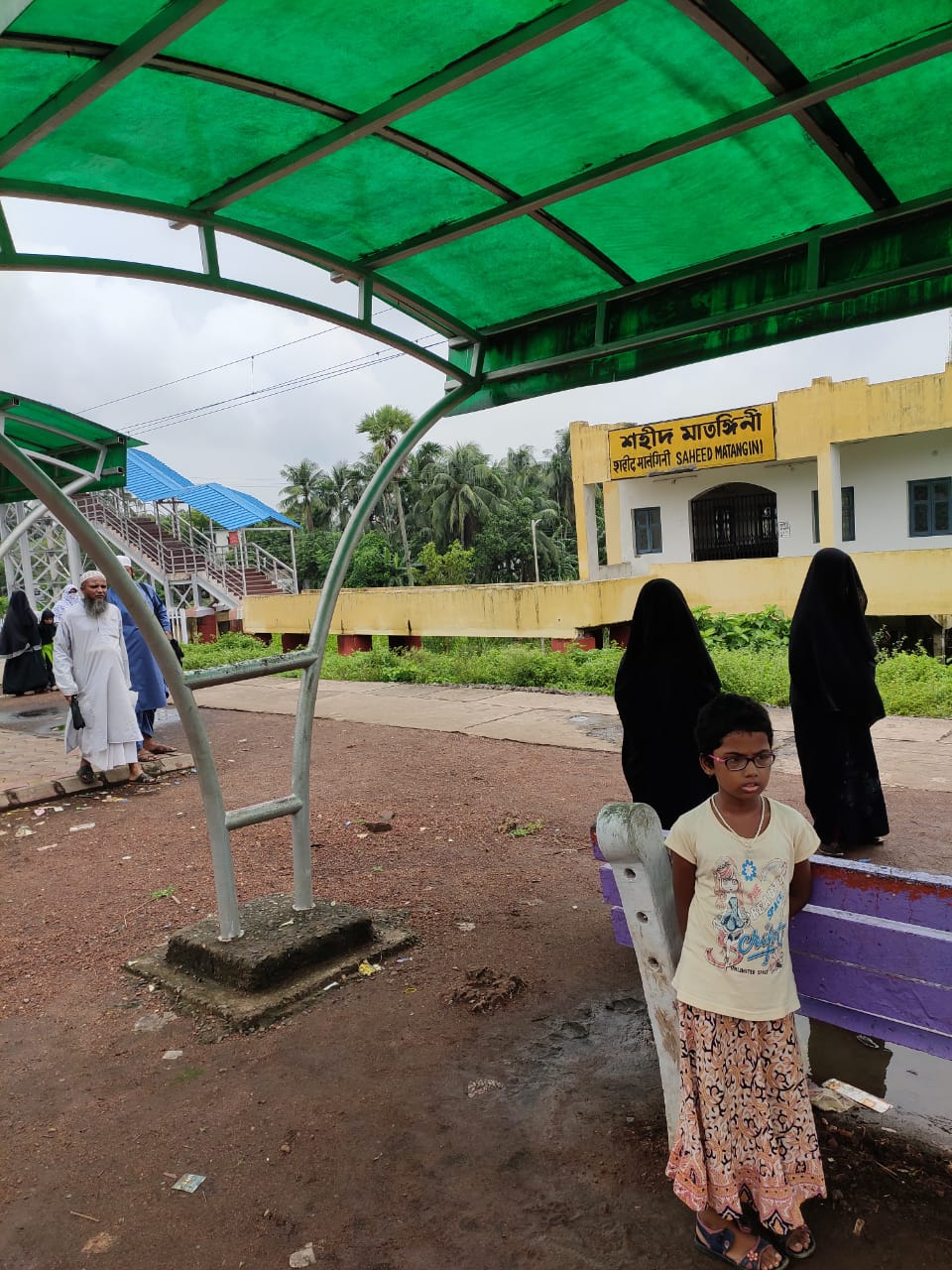
Sahid Matangini railway station
