= Lakshman Chandra Seth =

Indian politician (born 1946)

Member of Parliament, Lok Sabha
- In office 1998–2009
- Preceded by: Jayanta Bhattacharya
- Succeeded by: Suvendu Adhikari
- Constituency: Tamluk

Member of the West Bengal Legislative Assembly
- In office 1982–1996
- Preceded by: Shiba Nath Das
- Succeeded by: Tushar Kanti Mandal
- Constituency: Sutahata

Personal details
- Born: 11 April 1946 (age 80) Midnapore, Bengal Presidency, British India
- Party: Indian National Congress (2018–present)
- Other political affiliations: Communist Party of India (Marxist) (expelled in 2014); Bharatiya Janata Party (2016–2018)
- Spouse(s): Late Tamalika Panda Seth; Manashi Dey
- Children: 2 sons

Lakshman Chandra Seth (born 11 April 1946), commonly known as Lakshman Seth, is an Indian politician from Tamluk, West Bengal, India. He was a West Bengal state committee member of the CPI(M) and is a former MP of Tamluk.

He was expelled from the Communist Party of India (Marxist). In 2016, Seth joined the Bharatiya Janata Party and merged Bharat Nirman Party of his own which was floated by him after his expulsion from the CPI(M). He was expelled from BJP in 2018 and fought 2019 election from Tamluk constituency from Indian National Congress ticket. Mr. Lakshman Chandra Seth is widely recognised for his contributions in education sector.

== Electoral History ==
=== Lok Sabha ===
Year	Const.	Party	Votes	%	Opponent	Party	Votes	%	Result	Margin	%
2019	Tamluk	INC	16,001	1.11	Dibyendu Adhikari	AITC	7,24,433	50.07	Lost	-7,08,432	-48.96
2009	Tamluk	CPI(M)	4,64,706	40.47	Suvendu Adhikari	AITC	6,37,664	55.54	Lost	-1,72,958	-15.07
2004	Tamluk	CPI(M)	5,07,228	49.00	Suvendu Adhikari	AITC	4,49,848	43.45	Won	+57,380	+5.55
1999	Tamluk	CPI(M)	4,55,168	50.04	Nirmalendu Bhattacharjee	AITC	4,00,342	44.01	Won	+54,826	+6.03
1998	Tamluk	CPI(M)	4,77,516	51.24	Nirmalendu Bhattacharjee	AITC	3,89,564	41.80	Won	+87,952	+9.44
1996	Tamluk	CPI(M)	4,42,563	47.82	Jayanta Bhattacharya	INC	4,50,473	48.67	Lost	-7,910	-0.85
