= Rajgoda railway station =

Railway station in West Bengal, India

Rajgoda
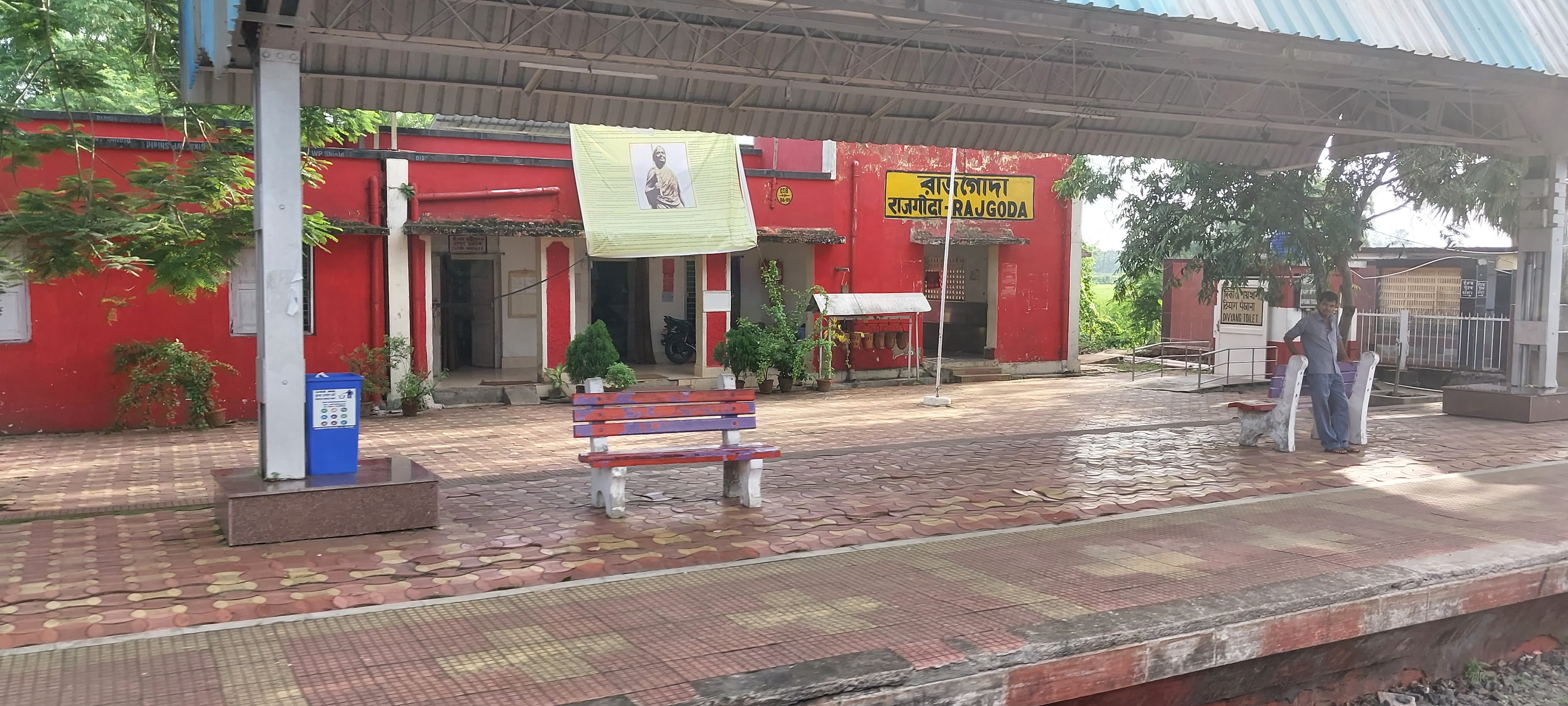
- Rajgoda Railway Station

General information
- Location: Rajgoda, Purba Medinipur district, West Bengal; India
- Coordinates: 22°19′28″N 87°51′59″E
- Elevation: 6 metres (20 ft)
- System: Kolkata Suburban Railway station
- Owner: Indian Railways
- Line: Panskura–Haldia line
- Platforms: 3
- Tracks: 4

Construction
- Structure type: Standard on-ground station
- Parking: No
- Cycle facilities: yes

Other information
- Station code: RGA
- Fare zone: South Eastern Railway

History
- Opened: 1968
- Electrified: 1974–76

Services
Preceding station	Kolkata Suburban Railway	Following station
Saheed Matangini towards Haldia	South Eastern Line Panskura–Haldia line	Raghunathbari towards Howrah Junction
Route map
Location
- Location within West Bengal

Rajgoda railway station in the Indian state of West Bengal, serves Near NH 41, Rajgoda, India in Purba Medinipur district. It is on the Panskura–Haldia line. It is 82 km (51 mi) from Howrah station and 15 km (9 mi) from Panskura.

== History ==
Rajgoda railway station is situated in near NH 41, Rajgoda, West Bengal. Station code is RGA. It is a small railway station in Panskura–Haldia line. Neighbourhood stations are Raghunathbari and Saheed Matangini. Local EMU trains Haldia–Howrah Fast Local, Digha–Panskura local, Mecheda–Digha local, Haldia–Panskura local, Howrah–Haldia local train stop here. The Panskura–Durgachak line was opened in 1968, at a time when Haldia Port was being constructed. It was subsequently extended to Haldia. The Panskura–Haldia line was electrified in 1974–76. All lines were electrified with 25 kV AC overhead system. EMU train services between Panskura and Haldia introduced in 1976 and direct EMU services between Howrah and Haldia in 1979.
