= Sangrami Express =

Train in India

Overview
- Service type: Express
- First service: 9 December 2010; 15 years ago
- Last service: 2020 March 31
- Current operator: Southern Railway

Route
- Termini: Chennai Central (MAS); Haldia (HLZ)
- Stops: 13
- Distance travelled: 1,660 km (1,031 mi)
- Average journey time: 46 hours
- Service frequency: Weekly
- Train number: 22613 / 22614

On-board services
- Classes: AC Chair Car, AC 3 Tier, Sleeper Class, General Unreserved, SLR
- Seating arrangements: Yes
- Sleeping arrangements: Yes
- Catering facilities: Yes

Technical
- Rolling stock: Standard Indian Railways coaches
- Track gauge: 1,676 mm (5 ft 6 in)
- Operating speed: 59.5 km/h (37 mph)
Route map
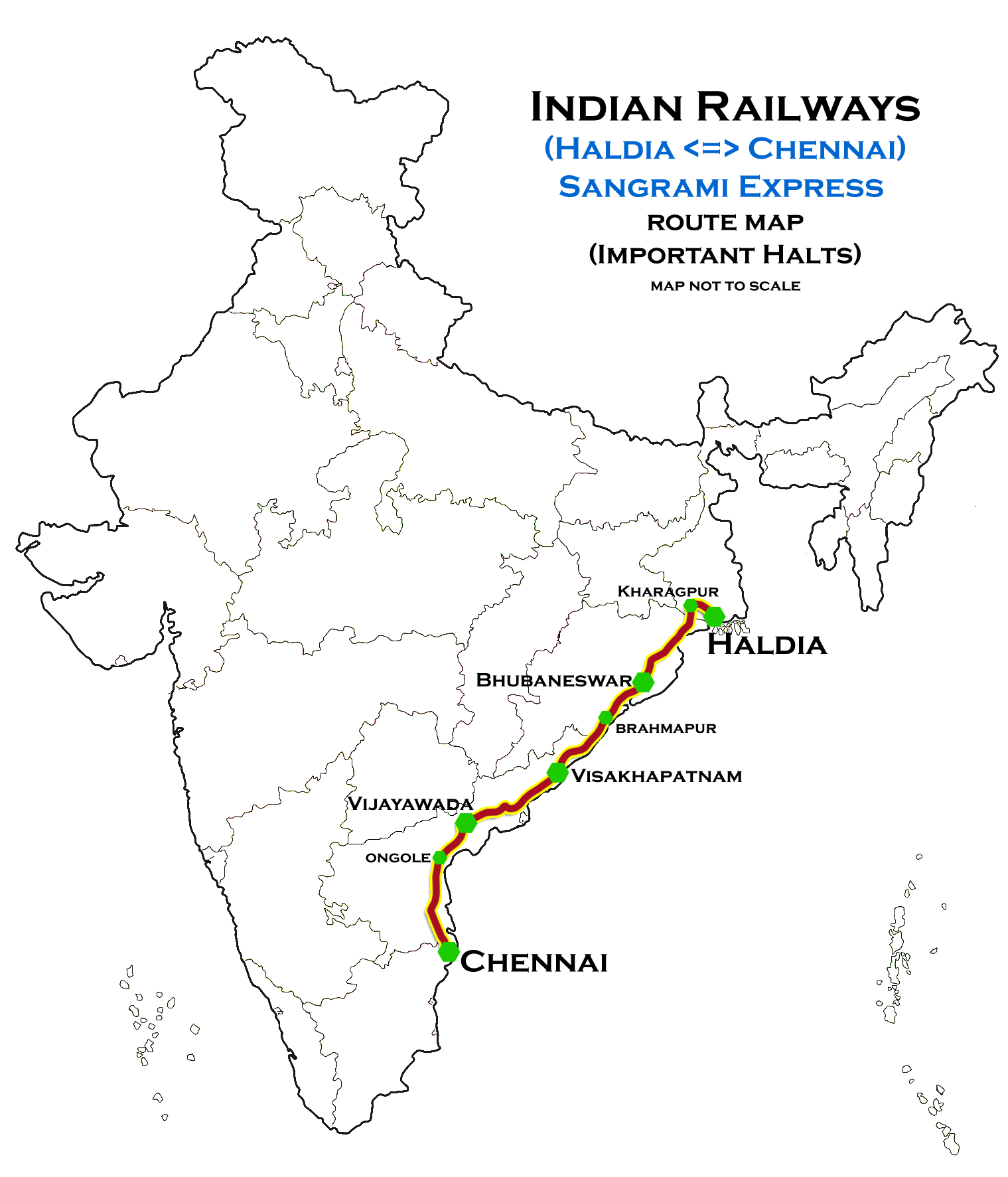

The 22613/14 Sangrami Express was an Express train belonging to Indian Railways Southern Railway zone that runs between Chennai Central and Haldia in India.

It operated as train number 22613 from Chennai Central to Haldia and as train number 22614 in the reverse direction serving the states of Tamil Nadu, Andhra Pradesh, Odisha, and West Bengal.

== Coaches ==
The 22613/14 Sangrami Express had one AC Chair Car, one AC 3-Tier, six Sleeper Class, six General Unreserved and two SLR (seating with luggage rake) coaches and two high-capacity parcel van coaches. It did not carry a pantry car.

As is customary with most train services in India, coach composition could be amended at the discretion of Indian Railways depending on demand.

== Service ==
The 22613 Chennai Central–Haldia Sangrami Express covered a distance of 1,660 km (1,031 mi) in 27 hours 50 mins (60 km/h) and in 28 hours 5 mins as the 22614 Haldia–Chennai Central Sangrami Express (59 km/h).

As the average speed of the train is slightly above 55 km/h (34 mph), as per railway rules, the fare includes a Superfast surcharge.

The train is permanently cancelled.

== Routing ==
The 22613/14 Sangrami Express ran from Chennai Central via Ongole, Vijayawada Junction, Rajahmundry, Visakhapatnam, Khurda Road Junction, Bhubaneswar, Kharagpur Junction, Tamluk Junction to Haldia.

== Traction ==
As the route is fully electrified, an Visakhapatnam-based WAP-4 locomotive powered the train to its destination.
