= Tamluk Hamilton High School =

School in West Bengal

- তমলুক হ্যামিল্টন উচ্চ বিদ্যালয়
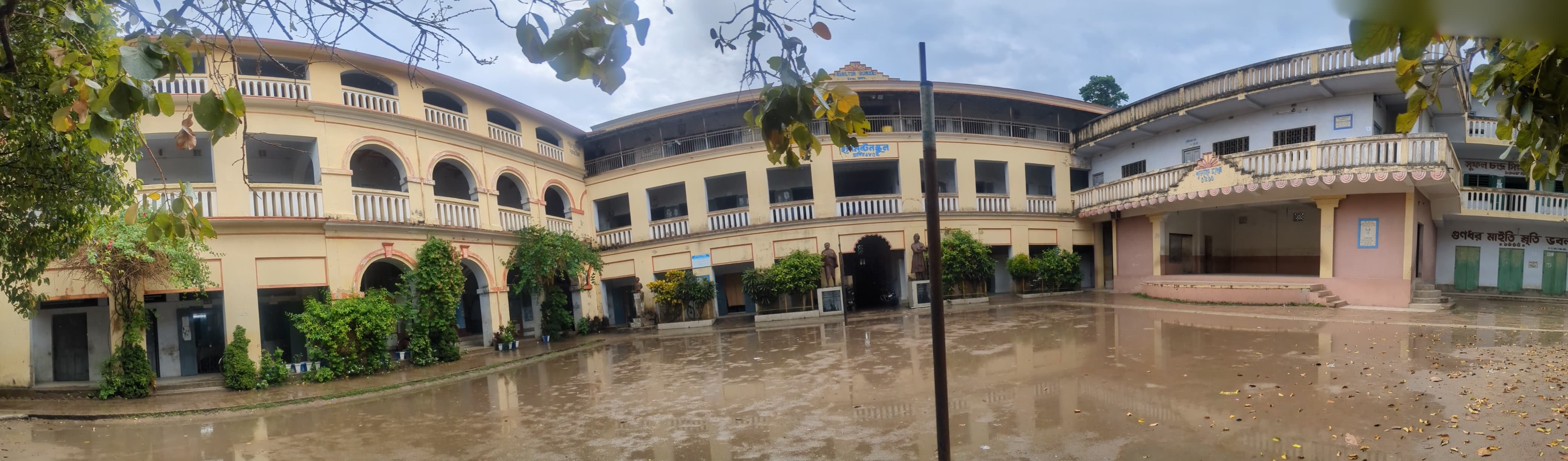

Location
- Parbatipur, Tamluk; Tamluk, West Bengal, 721636; India; 22.2901856°N 87.9232188°E

Information
- Motto: "আমরা করবো জয়" ("We Shall Overcome")
- Religious affiliation: Secular
- Established: May 7, 1852; 174 years ago
- Founder: Robert Charles Hamilton
- School board: WBBSE, WBCHSE, WBSCTVESD
- School district: East Medinipur
- Principal: Madhusudan Jana
- Staff: 51
- Faculty: 45
- Grades: 1st
- Gender: Boys
- Enrolment: 1500
- Language: Bengali and English
- Campus size: 95.353 Acre
- Campus type: Urban
- Colours: White & Black
- Yearbook: তমালিকা (Tamalika)
- Website: https://hamilton.page.tl/

Tamluk Hamilton High School is the second oldest school in the undivided Medinipur, in India. It originated in 1852, five years before the founding of the University of Calcutta.

== History ==
The school was founded in 1852 by Robert Charles Hamilton, a salt merchant and philanthropist, whose contributions towards education stand as a parallel to the works of David Hare. A number of archaeological finds from Tamluk (as well as a couple of finds from the nearby village of Moyna) were being kept at the school as of 1951. The Tamluk Hamilton School is an educational institution in the Medinipur district of West Bengal, India. The school is notable for having had Khudiram Bose, an Indian revolutionary, as a student from 1900 to 1903. Bose is widely regarded as one of the first martyrs of the Indian independence movement. Even most of the prominent leaders of the Tamralipta Jatiya Sarkar, such as Sushil Kumar Dhara, Ajoy Mukherjee and Rajani Kanta Pramanik has also been the alumni of this institution.

== Notable alumni ==
- Khudiram Bose, Indian nationalist, revolutionary, convicted in the Muzaffarpur conspiracy case and hanged, one of the youngest martyrs of the freedom movement
- Sushil Kumar Dhara, Indian revolutionary leader and politician, one of the founding members of the Tamralipta Jatiya Sarkar during the Quit India Movement
- Jadugopal Mukherjee, Indian revolutionary and politician, one of the stalwart leaders of the Jugantar group
- Ajoy Kumar Mukherjee, Indian independence activist and politician, another founding member of Tamralipta Jatiya Sarkar, served as the 3rd Chief ministers of West Bengal
- Mukul Dey, Indian artist and considered the pioneer of Drypoint-etching, first Indian principal of the Government College of Art & Craft, Kolkata
- Raja Dhirendra Narayan Roy Lt Col, freedom fighter, Doctor, and Raja of Tamluk
- Paresh Maity, Indian artist and painter, was awarded the Padma Shri award
- Samit Bhanja, actor and director, was regarded as one of the most promising actors of Bengali cinema of the time
- Subhendu Samanta, Justice of Calcutta High Court.

== See also ==
- Education in India
- List of schools in India
- Education in West Bengal
