= Ajoy Mukherjee =

Indian politician (1901–1986)

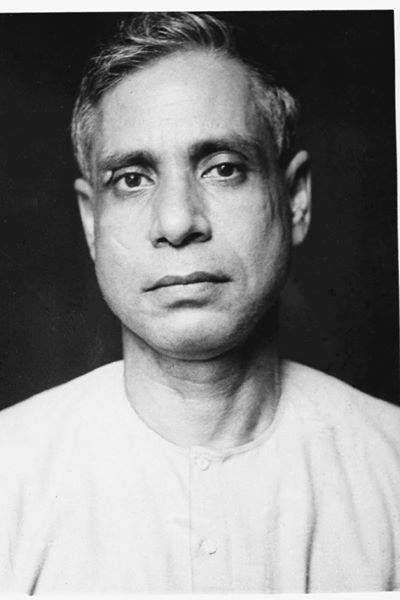
- Official Potrait

3rd Chief Minister of West Bengal
- In office 1 March 1967 – 21 November 1967
- Governor: Padmaja Naidu; Dharma Vira
- Preceded by: Prafulla Chandra Sen
- Succeeded by: Prafulla Chandra Ghosh
- In office 25 February 1969 – 30 July 1970
- Governor: Dharma Vira; Deep Narayan Sinha (acting); Shanti Swaroop Dhavan
- Cabinet: Mukherjee II
- Preceded by: President's rule
- Succeeded by: President's rule
- In office 2 April 1971 – 28 June 1971
- Governor: Shanti Swaroop Dhavan
- Preceded by: President's rule
- Succeeded by: President's rule

Member of West Bengal Legislative Assembly
- In office 1951–1967
- Preceded by: Constituency established
- Succeeded by: Ajoy Malakar
- Constituency: Tamluk
- In office 1967–1968
- Preceded by: Constituency established
- Succeeded by: Prafulla Chandra Sen
- Constituency: Arambagh
- In office 1969–1977
- Preceded by: Ajoy Malakar
- Succeeded by: Biswanath Mukherjee
- Constituency: Tamluk

Personal details
- Born: 15 April 1901 Tamluk, Bengal Presidency, British India (present-day West Bengal, India)
- Died: 27 May 1986 (aged 85) Calcutta, West Bengal, India
- Party: Indian National Congress (R)
- Other political affiliations: Bangla Congress; Indian National Congress
- Education: Tamluk Hamilton High School
- Awards: Padma Vibhushan (1977)

Ajoy Kumar Mukherjee (15 April 1901 – 27 May 1986) was an Indian independence activist and politician who served three short terms as the Chief Minister of West Bengal. He hailed from Tamluk, Purba Medinipur district, West Bengal.

== Life and career ==
Ajoy Kumar Mukherjee, born in Tamluk, West Bengal, India in 1901, was one of the leaders of Tamralipta Jatiya Sarkar (Tamrlipta National Government), which came into effect on 17 December 1942 during the Quit India Movement, a programme of civil disobedience launched in India in 1942. He was greatly influenced by Swami Vivekananda. Earlier a member of the Indian National Congress, he later founded the Bangla Congress, which co-governed with the Communist Party of India (Marxist) in two United Front governments in 1967-1971. He held the chief ministerial position in both these governments, from March to November 1967, and again from February 1969 to March 1970.

In the year 1967 Ajoy Mukherjee defeated Prafulla Chandra Sen, another Gandhian, at Arambagh assembly constituency and became chief minister of West Bengal after Sen. Architect of Ajoy Mukherjee's victory at Arambagh was Narayan Ch Ghosh, the then students leader at Arambagh. Narayan Ghosh accompanied Ajoy Mukherjee in a boat for several days to see several flood affected areas in Arambagh & Ghatal subdivision in 1968. People of flood affected areas were enthused by Ajoy Mukherjee for his tireless move to stand for them.

In 1971, Ajoy Mukherjee with some of his close colleagues, viz. Pranab Mukherjee etc., joined Indian National Congress (R) leaving Sushil Dhara – his long term associate. He was offered ministerial post at Centre by Prime Minister Indira Gandhi, but Ajoy Mukherjee declined, citing his age and health condition and recommended Pranab Mukherjee for the post, who became State Minister in the Indian Cabinet.

He was awarded the Padma Vibhushan award in 1977 from Government of India.

His brother Biswanath Mukherjee & sister-in-law Geeta Mukherjee were both members of the Communist Party of India. Ajoy's niece Kalyani (daughter of another brother) was married to Mohan Kumaramangalam and was the mother of Rangarajan Kumaramangalam and Lalitha Kumaramangalam.

Mukherjee died on 27 May 1986 in Calcutta.

Political offices
Preceded by Prafulla Chandra Sen	Chief Minister of West Bengal; 15 March 1967 – 2 November 1967	Succeeded by Prafulla Chandra Ghosh
Preceded by President's Rule	Chief Minister of West Bengal; 25 February 1969 – 19 March 1970	Succeeded by President's Rule
