= Tamluk =

Town in West Bengal, India

Tamluk Tamralipta, Tamralipti, Tamolika
- City
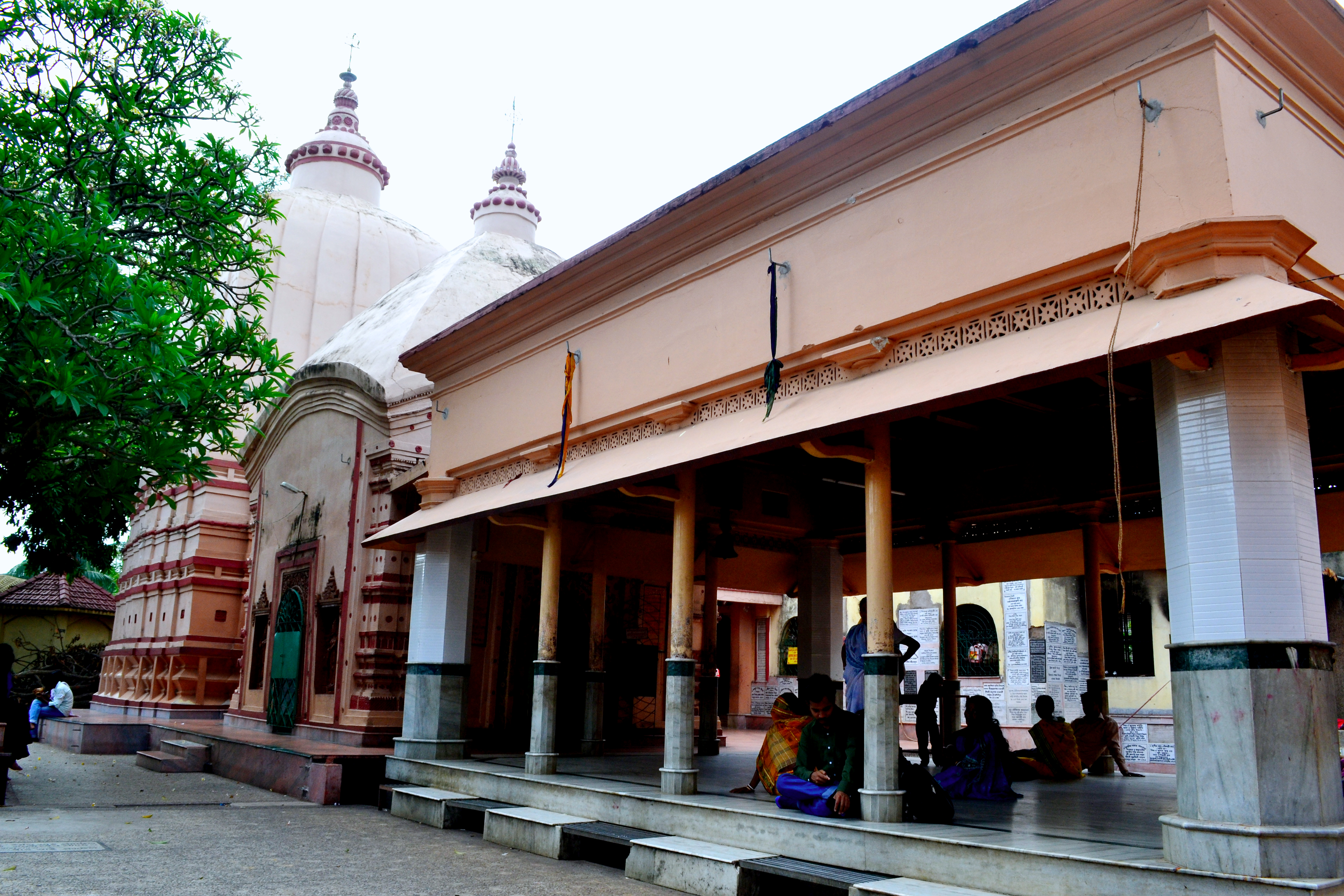
- Bargabhima temple at Tamluk

- Location in West Bengal, India Tamluk (India) Tamluk (Asia)
- Coordinates: 22.3°N 87.92°E
- Country: India
- State: West Bengal
- District: East Medinipur

Government
  - Type: Municipality
  - Body: Tamluk Municipality; Haldia Development Authority

Area
  - Total: 17.86 km^{2} (6.90 sq mi)
- Elevation: 7 m (23 ft)

Population (2011)
  - Total: 65,306
  - Density: 3,657/km^{2} (9,470/sq mi)

Languages
  - Official: Bengali
  - Additional official: English
- Time zone: UTC+5:30 (IST)
- PIN: 721636 721627 721648 721649
- Telephone code: 91-3228
- Vehicle registration: WB 29-xxxx, WB 30-xxxx
- Lok Sabha constituency: Tamluk
- Vidhan Sabha constituency: Tamluk
- Website: purbamedinipur.gov.in

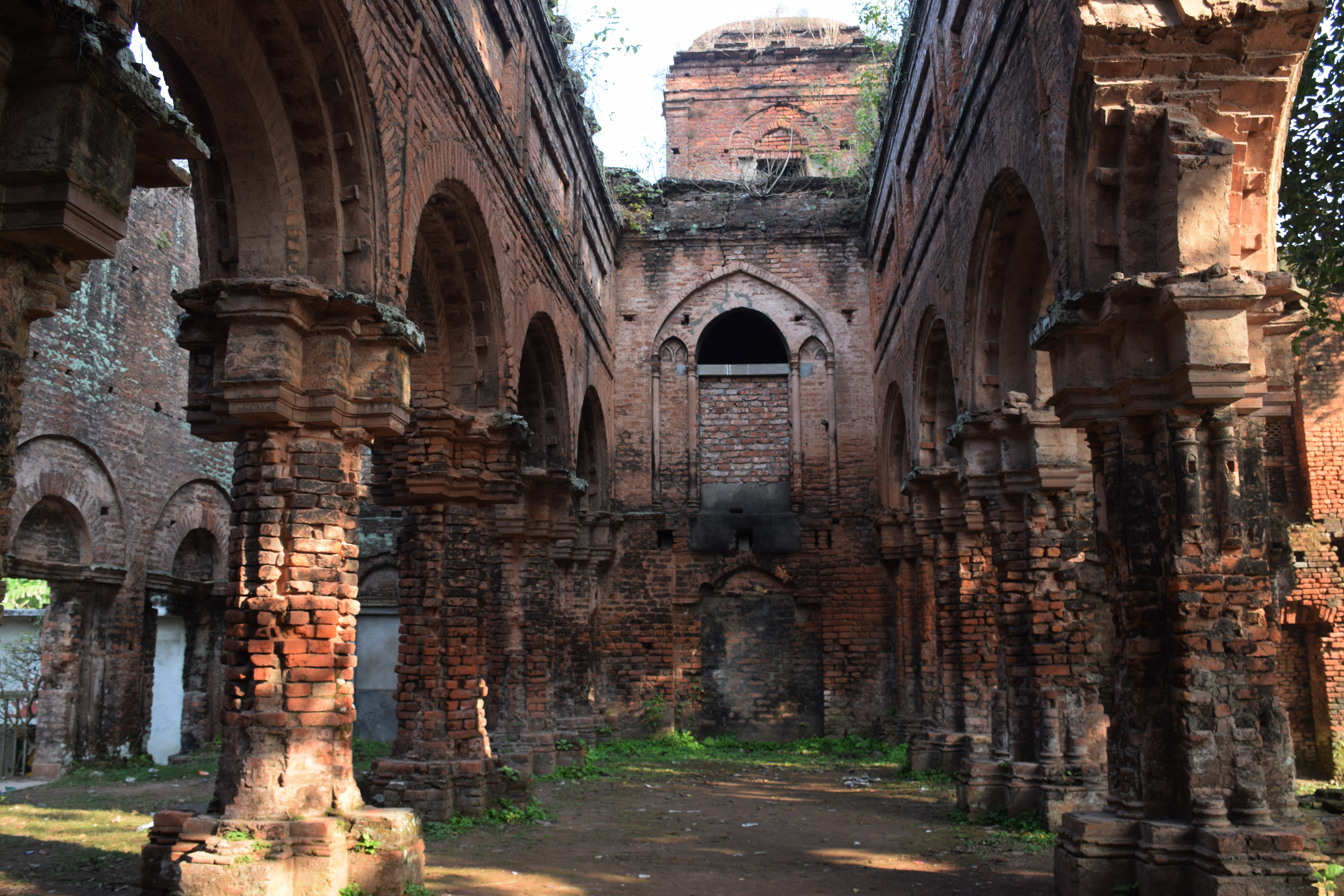
Ruins of Tamluk Rajbari

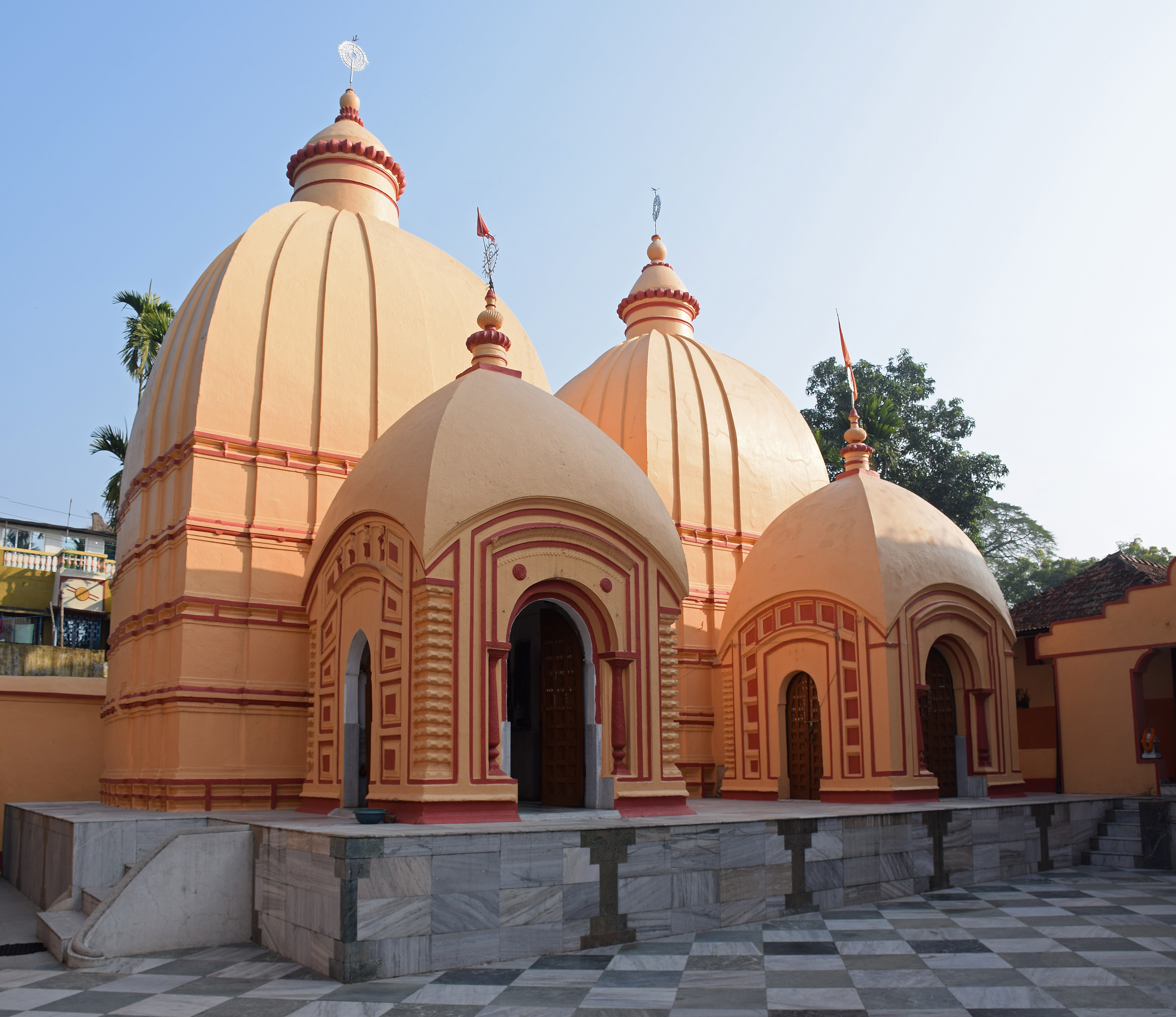
Radhamadhab and Radharaman Deul temple in Tamluk

Tamluk (Bengali pronunciation: [tɔmluk]), is a city and a municipality in the Indian state of West Bengal. It is one of the oldest continuously inhabited cities of the world and the headquarters of the Purba Medinipur district. Though there is some controversy, scholars have generally agreed that present-day Tamluk is the site of the ancient city variously known as Tamralipta or Tamralipti, where Xuanzang (romanised Hiuen Tsang), a Chinese traveller and Chinese Buddhist monk Faxian (romanised Fa-Hien) also visited the town, is now located on the banks of Rupnarayan River, close to the Bay of Bengal.

== Name ==
According to T. N. Ramachandran, the name "Tamluk" is related to the older form Tamālikā, which is a variant spelling (found in the Trikāṇḍaśesha) of the ancient name Tāmraliptī (or Tāmralipta). Other names listed in the Trikāṇḍaśesha and the Abhidānachintāmaṇi as referring to Tāmraliptī include Staṁbhapura, Velākūla, and Vishṇugṛiha.

== History ==
This ancient kingdom and port city was bounded by the Bay of Bengal in the south, Rupnarayan River in the east and Subarnarekha River in the west. The Rupnarayana is the joint flow of the rivers Dwarakeswar and Silai. The Bay of Bengal and these great rivers with their numerous branches created a prosperous and easy water navigational system fostering commerce, culture and early contacts with the people outside the region. At the same time, these rivers helped to develop the agriculture in this region.

Archaeological remains show continuous settlement from about the 3rd century BC. It was known as Tramralipta (in the Puranas and the Mahabharata), Tamralipta (in the Mahabharata), Tamalika (in historical documents), Tamalitti (in foreigners' descriptions), or Tamoluk (in the British Raj). It was a seaport, now buried under river silt. For this reason, Tamluk has many ponds and lakes remaining today.

In the Mahabharata (Bhishma Parva/Navam Adhyay), while describing the names of the holiest rivers and kingdoms of India, Sanjay took the name of "Tramralipta" to Dhritarashtra.

Tamluk was also known as Bhivas, in religious texts, and Madhya Desh, as the Middle State of Utkal/Kalinga and Banga.

According to Jain sources, Tamralipti was the capital of the Tamralipti Janapada and was long known as a port.

== Archaeology ==
Several archaeological find sites have been found in Tamluk, including a number of high mounds in the town as well as in and around various tanks. The Bargabhīmā Temple, in the middle of town, is built on one such mound. Another mound is now occupied by the local Mission house. Here, people digging a well found wood fragments at a depth of 50 feet, which T. N. Ramachandran compared to the remains of the Maurya-era wooden palisade found at Pataliputra. At another high mound, this one by the Rupnarayan riverbank, a hoard of about 350 coins dated to the 1st-2nd centuries BCE was found by K. N. Dikshit in the early 1920s.

Just east of the Rajbari in central Tamluk is a large square tank called Khātpukūr, which probably dates from the 15th century. Digging here, Ramachandran's group found terracotta remains with similarities to Shunga-period artifacts, but because of where they were found, Ramachandran did not assign them a date. Among the artifacts found at Khātpukūr were a couple of Egyptian-style vases, which also could not be dated. They may have been either imports from Egypt or local imitations of Egyptian style. Either way, their presence indicates long-distance cultural contact due to maritime trade, as would be expected at a major port like Tāmraliptī. At another site, "an oblong tank next to the local school", old brick walls and terracotta fragments were found under Gurusday Dutt. Various items were found in and around a couple of tanks on Adhikaripara Road, Padambasan Road, and School Road.

A group led by T. N. Ramachandran undertook a survey of various sites in Tamluk in the 1940s.

== Geography ==
Cities and towns in Tamluk subdivision of Purba Medinipur district
M: municipal city/ town, CT: census town, R: rural/ urban centre, H: historical/ religious centre
Owing to space constraints in the small map, the actual locations in a larger map may vary slightly

Tamluk is located on the right bank of the Rupnarayan river, about 19 km upstream from where it joins the Hooghly River.

=== Police station ===
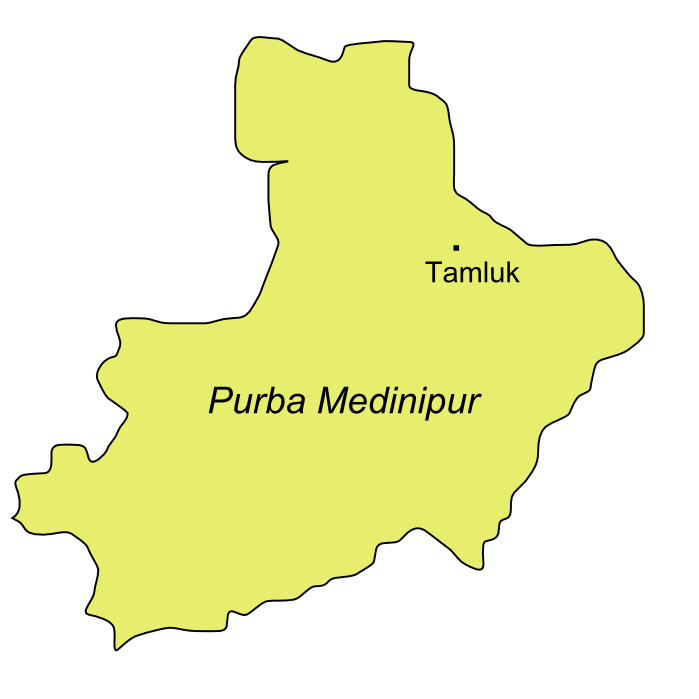
Map of Purba Medinipur showing Tamluk

Tamluk police station has jurisdiction over Tamluk (municipality) and Tamluk CD Block. Tamluk police station covers an area of 214.14 km^{2} with a population of 352,748.

== Demographics ==
Historical population
Year	Pop.	±%
1972	5,849	—
1881	6,044	+3.3%
1891	6,612	+9.4%
1901	8,085	+22.3%
1911	8,048	−0.5%
1921	8,348	+3.7%
1931	9,095	+8.9%
1941	12,079	+32.8%
1951	13,599	+12.6%
1961	17,986	+32.3%
1971	22,478	+25.0%
1981	29,367	+30.6%
1991		—
2001		—
2011	65,306	—
Source: Census of India

According to 2011 Indian Census, Tamluk had a total population of 65,306, of which 33,260 were males and 32,046 were females. Population within the age group of 0 to 6 years was 6,180. The total number of literates in Tamluk was 53,318, which constituted 81.6% of the population with male literacy of 85.0% and female literacy of 78.1%. The effective literacy rate of population (7 years and above) of Tamluk was 90.2%, of which male literacy rate was 94.0% and female literacy rate was 86.2%. The Scheduled Castes and Scheduled Tribes population was 4,441 and 201 respectively. Tamluk had 14489 households in 2011.

== Transport ==
Tamluk has two railway stations - Tamluk Junction and Sahid Matangini.

== Education ==
=== Schools ===
- Sudhir Memorial Institute Tamluk :- It is an CBSE English - Medium School
- Tamralipta Public School, an ICSE and ISC affiliated school
- Matangini Mission School, Tamluk :- It is a Bengali & English - Medium School
- Tamluk Hamilton High School :- A school under West Bengal board, established on 1852.
- Rajkumari Santanamoyee Girls' High School :- A school under West Bengal board
- Tamluk High School :- A school under West Bengal board
- Demari High School :- A school under West Bengal board
- Tamralipta Vidyapith School : A school under West Bengal board
- Ratnali Adarsha Valika Vidyalaya : A school under West Bengal board
- Radhaballavpur Bhima Charan Basu Vidyapith : A school under West Bengal board
- Kulberia Bhimdeb Adarsha Vidyapith :A school under West Bengal board
- Bhander Beria Debendra High School : A school under West Bengal board
- Kakgechia Satyanarayan High School : A school under West Bengal board
- Jogikhop Girl High School : A school under West Bengal board
- Banhichar High School : A school under West Bengal board
- Kelomal Santoshini High School : A school under West Bengal board
- Nakibasan High School : A school under West Bengal board
- Daharpur Tapashili High School
- Salgechia High School
- Zilla Public School

=== Colleges ===
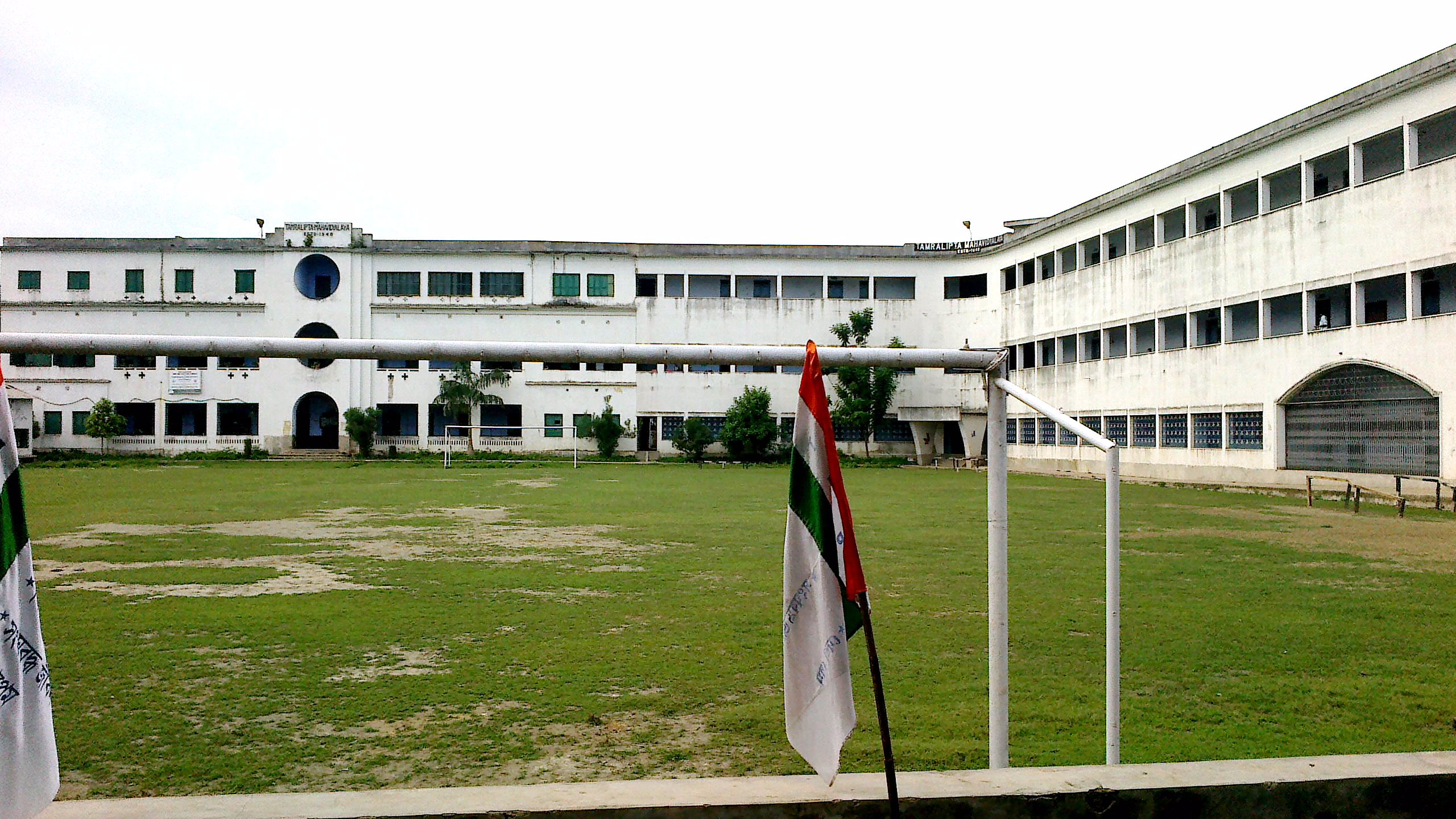
Tamralipta Mahavidyalaya

- Tamralipta Mahavidyalaya was established in 1948. It is affiliated to Vidyasagar University. It offers courses in arts, science, commerce and education.
- Shahid Matangini Hazra Government College for Women was established at Nimtouri, Tamluk in 2015. It is affiliated to Vidyasagar University.
- Tamralipto Government Medical College and Hospital, established in 2022. It is affiliated to WBUHS.

== Landmarks and tourist places ==
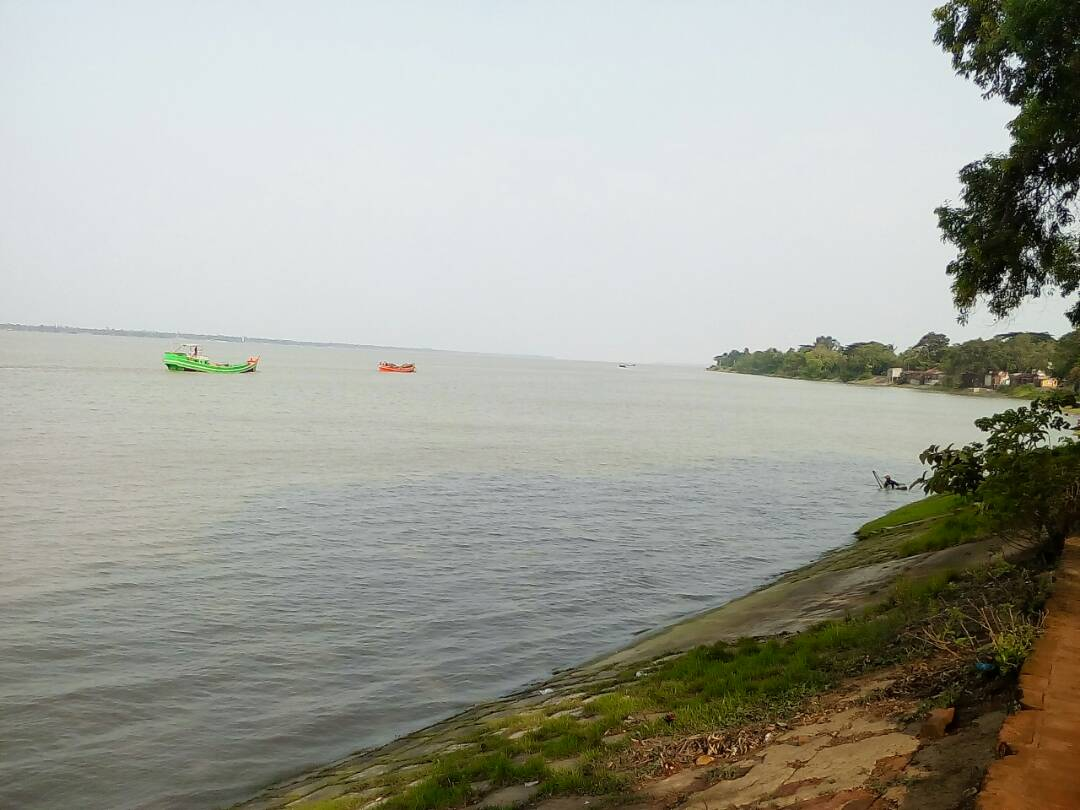
Rupnarayan Riverside Tamluk

- Rupnarayan river bank: The bank of river Rupnarayan is famous for picnic.
- Devi Barghobhima: Nearly 1150-year-old Temple of Kali named as Devi Bargobhima. This temple is a part of 51 Shakta pithas. Puranas say that the small finger of left feet of Sati/Parvati fell here when Lord Vishnu cut the sacred Body of Goddess Sati into several pieces to pacify Lord Shiva.
- Tamluk Rajbari: Located on the outskirts of town, the old ruined royal abode of the Bhanj dynasty (Mayur/Peacock), is a tourist destination.
- Rakhit Bati: It is another place to visit in Tamluk. In the beginning of 19th century it was a secret centre of the then revolutionary party Anusilan Samiti & Gupta samiti. The historian late Shri Tailakyanath Rakhit rebuilt this building.
- Geonkhali: At geonkhali river Rupnarayan joins Hooghly river.

== Notable people ==
- Matangini Hazra, Indian independence movement revolutionary and martyr
- Satish Chandra Samanta, Indian independence movement activist and leader of Tamralipta Jatiya Sarkar
- Ajoy Mukherjee, former Chief Minister of West Bengal.
- Sushil Kumar Dhara, co-founder of Tamralipta Jatiya Sarkar in British India & after independence he also served as Industry and Commerce Minister of West Bengal.
- Raja Dhirendra Narayan Roy, member of the Tamluk Raj family, Doctor, and an independence activist.
- Paresh Maity, artist.
- Mani Lal Bhaumik, Indian American physicist and best-selling author
- Ashok Dinda, former cricketer of Indian National Cricket Team and politician.

== Gallery ==
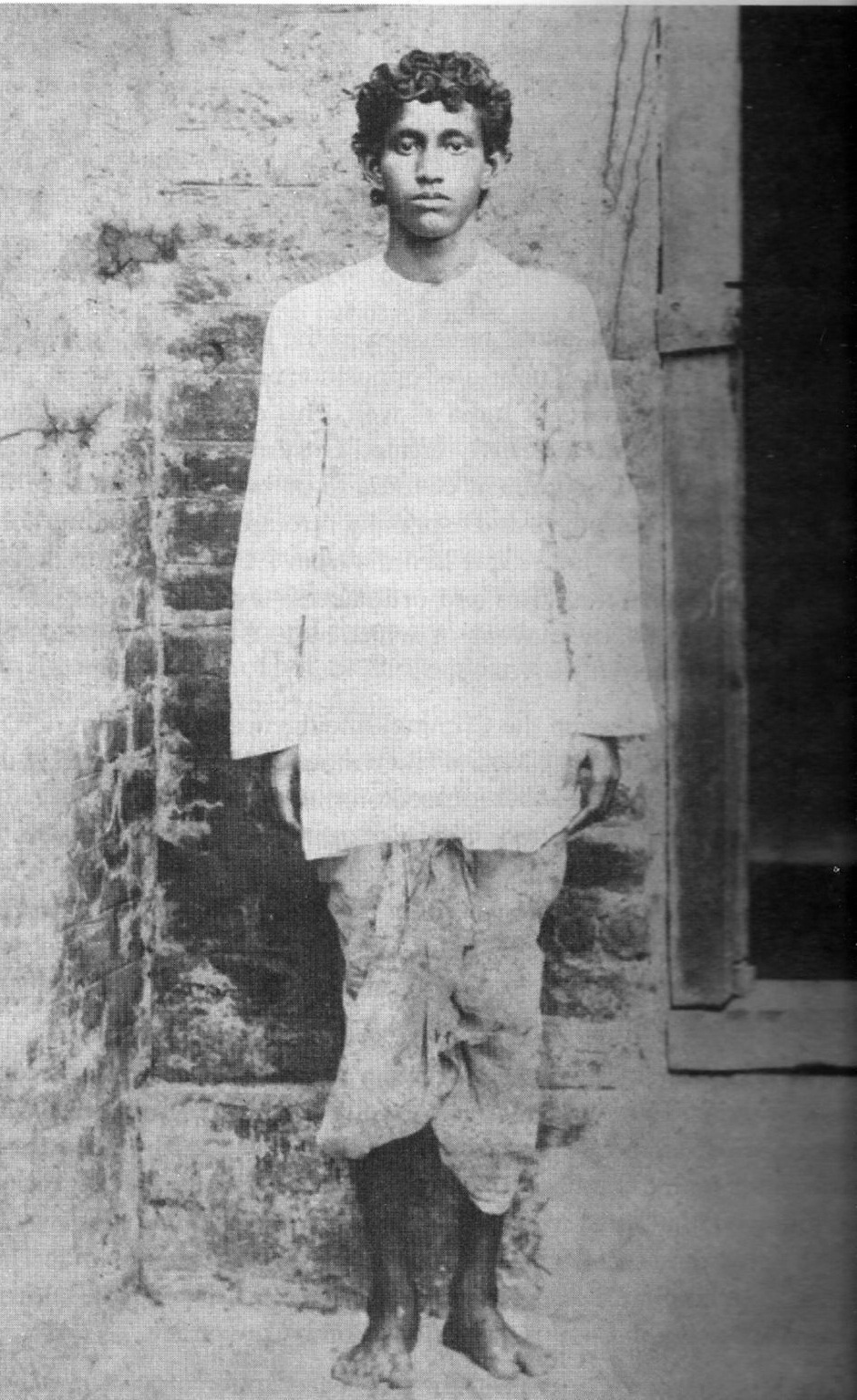
Khudiram Bose

Tamluk Junction railway station

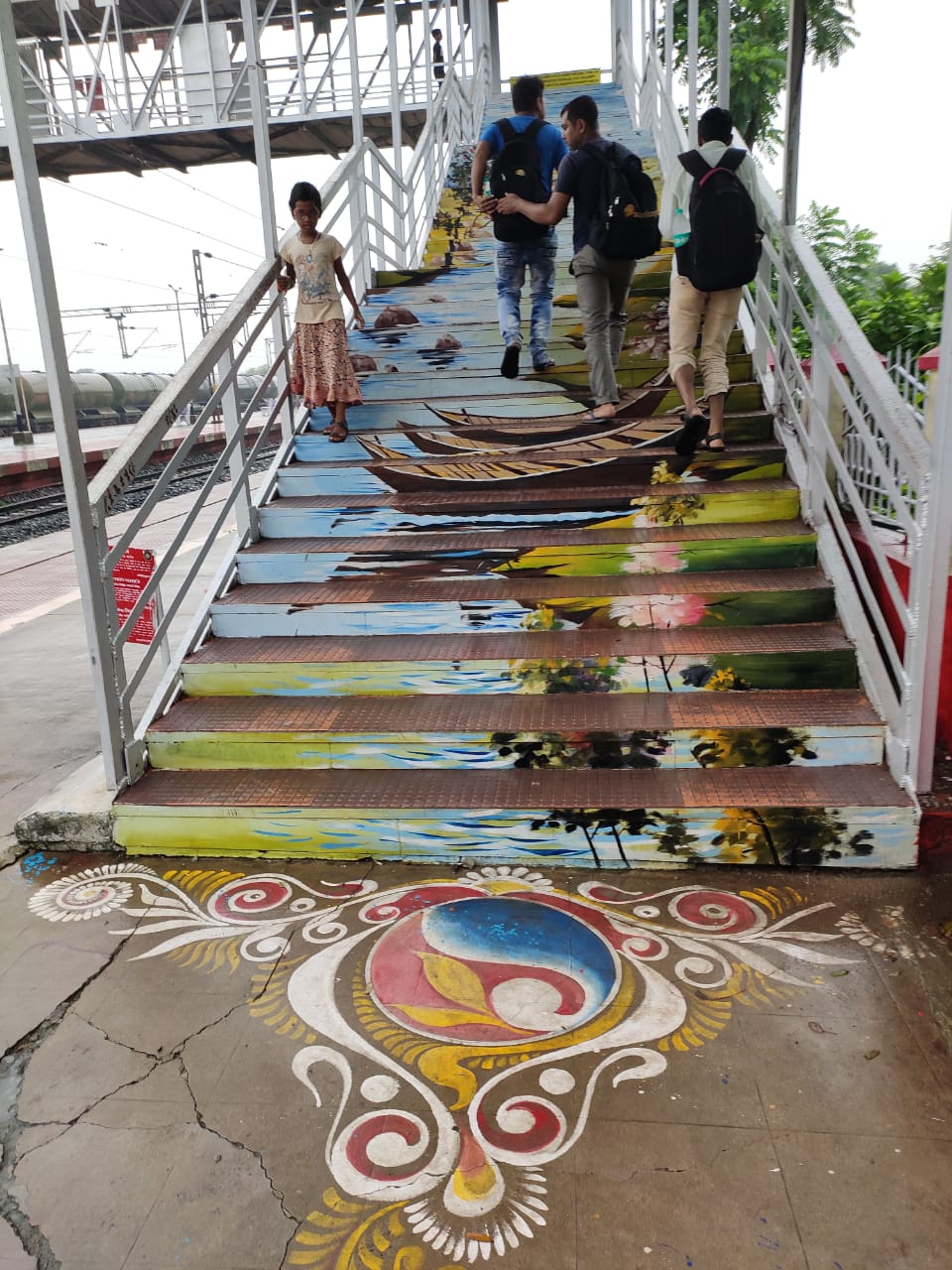
Tamluk Junction Foot-over Bridge

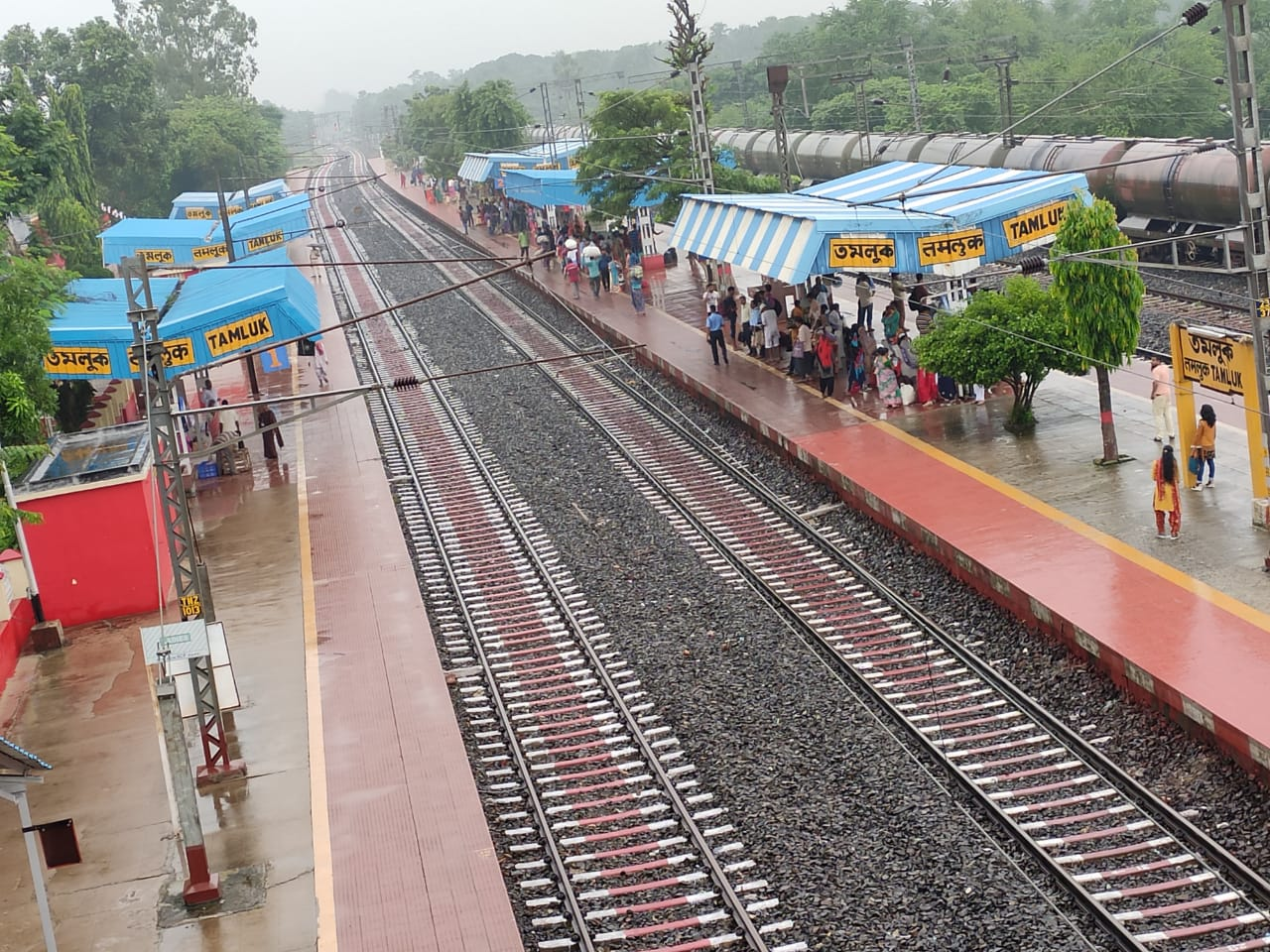
A view of station from foot overbridge

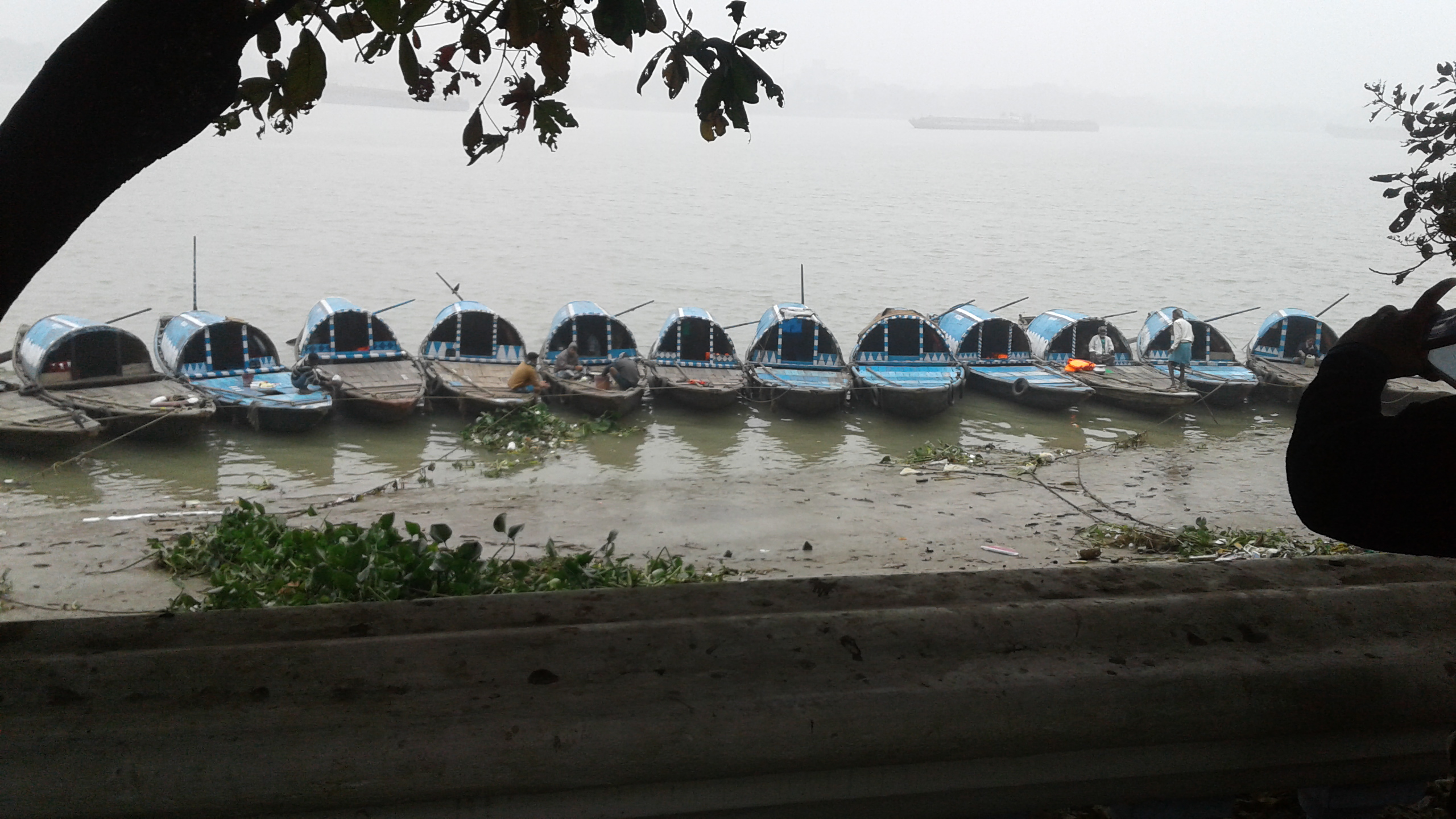
Rupnarayan river bank, Tamluk

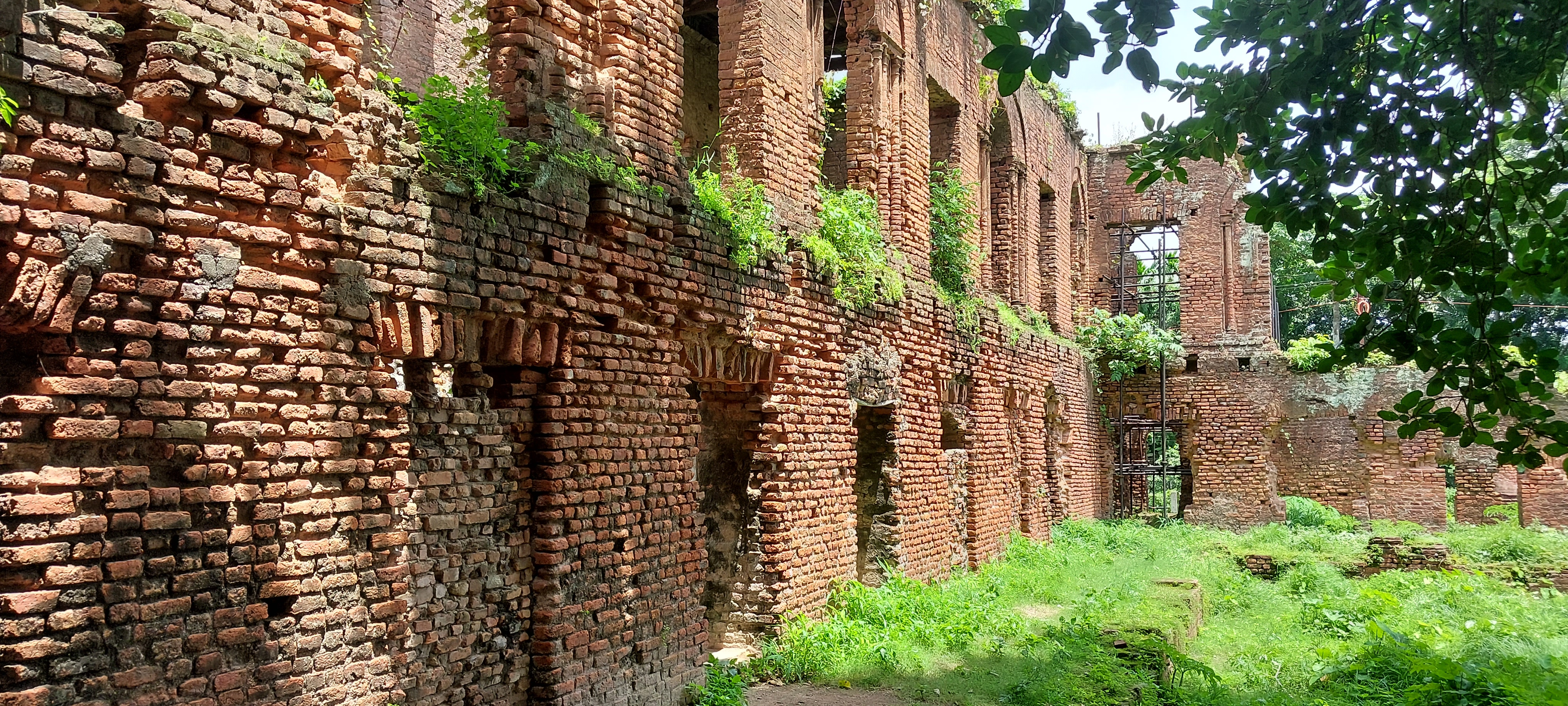
Ruined royal palace of Tamluk

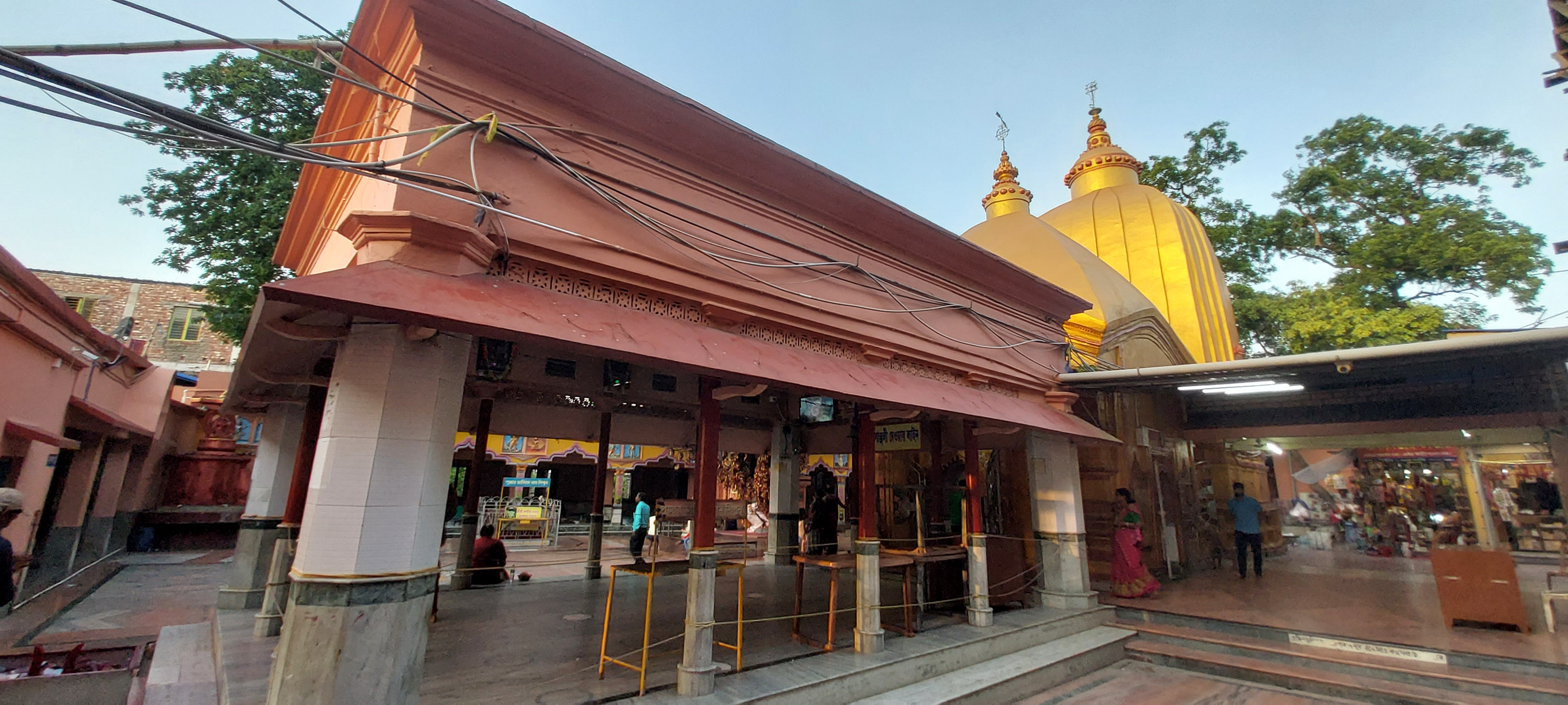
Bargabhima, the ancient temple of Tamluk

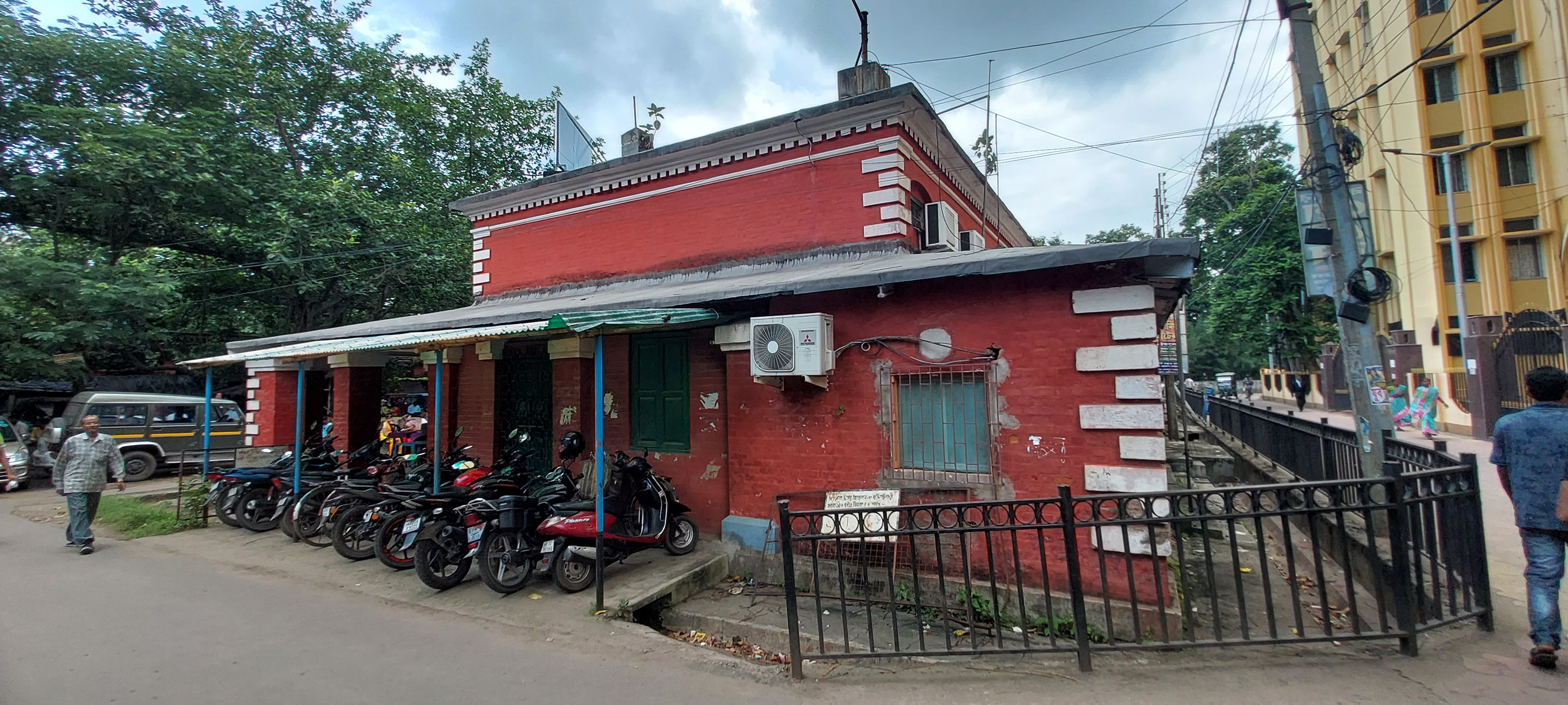
East Medinipur District and Session Court at Tamluk

== See also ==
- Tamluk (Lok Sabha constituency)
- Tamralipta
- Tamluk Royal Family
