= Sutahata Assembly constituency =

Former West Bengal Legislative Assembly constituency

Coordinates: 22°08′N 88°05′E

Sutahata
- Former constituency No. 205 for the West Bengal Legislative Assembly

Constituency details
- Country: India
- Region: East India
- State: West Bengal
- District: Purba Medinipur
- Lok Sabha constituency: Tamluk
- Established: 1962
- Abolished: 2011
- Reservation: None

Sutahata Assembly constituency was an assembly constituency in Purba Medinipur district in the Indian state of West Bengal.

== Overview ==
As a consequence of the orders of the Delimitation Commission, Sutahata Assembly constituency ceases to exist from 2011.

It was part of Tamluk (Lok Sabha constituency).

== Results ==
=== 2006 ===
In the 2006 elections, Nityananda Bera of CPI(M) defeated his nearest rival Tushar Kanti Mondal of Trinamool Congress.

West Bengal assembly elections, 2006: Sutahata constituency
Party	Candidate	Votes	%	±%
CPI(M)	Nityananda Bera	108,033	56.80	
AITC	Tushar Kanti Mondal	70,754	37.20	
INC	Narendra Nath Patra	6929	3.60	
Independent	Rabindaranth Biswas	2353	1.20	
Independent	Tushar Mandal	2247	1.20	
Majority		37,279	19.6%	
Turnout		190,355	(90.9%)	
CPI(M) hold		Swing		

=== 1977-2006 ===
- In 2006 and 2001 state assembly elections, Nityananda Bera of CPI(M) won the 205-Sutahata assembly seat (SC) defeating his nearest rival Tushar Kanti Mondal of Trinamool Congress.
- Tushar Kanti Mandal of Indian National Congress defeated Nityananda Bera of CPI(M) in 1996.
- Lakshman Chandra Seth of CPI(M) defeated Tushar Mandal of INC in 1991,
- Lakshman Chandra Seth of CPI(M) defeated Narendra Nath Patra of INC.
- Lakshman Chandra Seth of CPI(M) defeated Narendra Nath Patra of Independent candidate in 1982.
- Shiba Nath Das of Janata Party defeated Lakshman Chandra Seth of CPI(M) in 1977.

=== 1962-1972 ===
- 1972 – Rabindra Nath Karan (Communist Party of India).
- 1971 – Baneswar Patra (Bangla Congress).
- 1969 – Harahari Deb (Indian National Congress).
- 1967 – M.C. Das (Bangla Congress).
- 1962 – Mahtab Chand Das (Indian National Congress).
