= Jayanta Bhattacharya =

Indian politician

Member of Parliament, Lok Sabha
- In office 1996-1998
- Preceded by: Satyagopal Misra
- Succeeded by: Lakshman Chandra Seth
- Constituency: Tamluk

Member of Parliament, Rajya Sabha
- In office 2000-2006
- Constituency: West Bengal

Personal details
- Born: 15 March 1947 (age 79) Kanchrapara, 24 Parganas, Bengal Presidency, British India
- Party: Indian National Congress (until 1999, 2002–present)
- Other political affiliations: Trinamool Congress (1999-2002)
- Spouse: Arundhati Bhattacharya
- Children: 1 son

Jayanta Bhattacharya is an Indian politician belonging to the Indian National Congress. He was elected to the Lok Sabha, lower house of the Parliament of India, from Tamluk in West Bengal in 1996. He was elected to the Rajya Sabha as an independent candidate backed by the Trinamool Congress but he rejoined the Congress in 2002.
