= Bargabhima Temple =

Hindu Temple in Tamluk, West Bengal

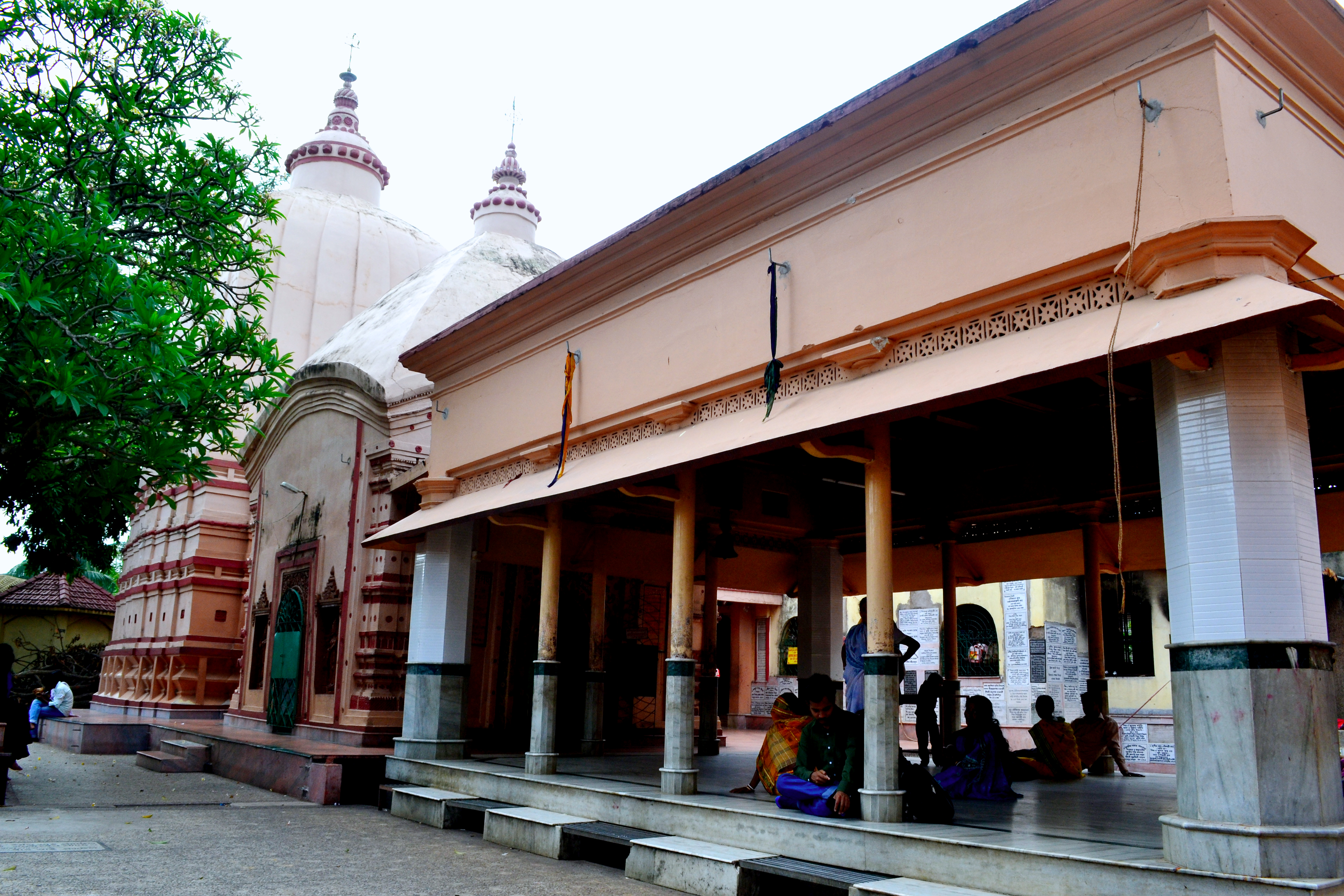
- Bargabhima Temple complex

- Location in West Bengal

Religion
- Affiliation: Hinduism
- District: Purba Medinipur
- Deity: Kali, Shiva, Durga

Location
- Location: Tamluk
- State: West Bengal
- Country: India
- Coordinates: 22°17′24.08″N 87°55′25.87″E

Bargabhima Temple is a Hindu ancient temple situated at Tamluk in Purba Medinipur district of West Bengal. The Bargabhima Temple, also known as Vibhash Shakti Peeth and Bhimakali Mandir, is devoted to the goddess Sati. This particular shrine of one of the 51 Shaktipeeth Temples stands by River Roopnarayana in Tamluk village, Purba Medinipur district in West Bengal. It was constructed by the Tamluk Raj family.

== History ==
It is a Kali temple. This place has been mentioned in Mahabharata as a place which Bhima acquired. This temple is considered as 51 shakti peth of mother Durga where left ankle of sati fell. According local stories it is believe that the temple was built by the Tamluk Raj. The temple has been declared by Heritage Site by West Bengal Govt. The current temple is not very old as it was rebuilt after the Islamic occupation of Bengal in the Middle Ages. In old Bengali literature, the temple was mentioned several times. The temple is the mixture of Bengali Hindu and Buddhist culture. Due to this Shakti tradition, many freedom fighter of Midnapore district took oath here that they will follow the path of dharma and free their motherland with the help of armed revolution. Famous revolutionary Khudiram Bosu used to come here to perform puja. The local people celebrate a large festival on Durga Puja, Bengali new year and Kali puja in this temple. In this temple prasad is prepared everyday for Devi Bargabhima and like most of the Shakti temple, prasad of Devi is not veg. Prasad of Devi is non-veg here and a cooked Snakehead murrel (শোল মাছ, 'sol mach') is mandatory for her. The bali ritual is abolished now, but once in a year it happens now.

== Transport ==
It is around 87.2 km from Kolkata, 85 km from Kharagpur, and well connected by NH- 116, SH 4 and Tamluk Junction Railway Station on south eastern railway tracks.

Tamluk is well connected by highways and railways:

- Tamluk to Mecheda, Kolaghat, Kolkata
- Tamluk to Panskura, Kharagpur
- Tamluk to Panskura Railways
- Tamluk to Haldia Railways
- Tamluk to Digha Railways
- Howrah to Haldia Railtrack
- Howrah to Digha Railtrack
- Haldia - Panskura - Kharagpur Railtrack

== See also ==
- Tamluk
- Kamakshya Temple, famous Saktapith.
