= Tamluk Lok Sabha constituency =

Lok Sabha Constituency in West Bengal, India

Coordinates: 22.3°N 87.9°E

Tamluk WB-30
- Lok Sabha constituency
- Interactive Map Outlining Tamluk Lok Sabha Constituency

Constituency details
- Country: India
- Region: East India
- State: West Bengal
- Assembly constituencies: Tamluk; Panskura Purba; Moyna; Nandakumar; Mahisadal; Haldia; Nandigram
- Established: 1951
- Total electors: 18,50,741
- Reservation: None

Member of Parliament
- 18th Lok Sabha
- Incumbent Abhijit Gangopadhyay
- Party: BJP
- Alliance: NDA
- Elected year: 2024

Tamluk Lok Sabha constituency is one of the 543 parliamentary constituencies in India. The constituency centres on Tamluk in West Bengal. All seven assembly segments under Tamluk Lok Sabha constituency are in Purba Medinipur district.

== Assembly segments ==
Parliamentary constituencies in West Bengal - 1. Cooch Behar, 2. Alipurduars, 3. Jalpaiguri, 4. Darjeeling, 5. Raiganj, 6. Balurghat, 7. Maldaha Uttar, 8. Maldaha Dakshin, 9. Jangipur, 10. Baharampur, 11. Murshidabad, 12. Krishnanagar, 13. Ranaghat, 14. Bangaon, 15. Barrackpore, 16. Dum Dum, 17. Barasat, 18. Basirhat, 19. Jaynagar, 20. Mathurapur, 21. Diamond Harbour, 22. Jadavpur, 23. Kolkata Dakshin, 24. Kolkata Uttar, 25. Howrah, 26. Uluberia, 27. Serampore, 28. Hooghly, 29. Arambagh, 30. Tamluk, 31, Kanthi, 32. Ghatal, 33. Jhargram, 34. Medinipur, 35. Purulia, 36. Bankura, 37. Bishnupur, 38. Bardhaman Purba, 39. Bardhaman Durgapur, 40. Asansol, 41. Bolpur, 42. Birbhum

As per order of the Delimitation Commission issued in 2006 in respect of the delimitation of constituencies in the West Bengal, parliamentary constituency no. 30 Tamluk is composed of the following segments:

#	Name	District	Member	Party	2024 Lead
203	Tamluk	Purba Medinipur	Hare Krishna Bera	BJP	BJP
204	Panskura Purba	Purba Medinipur	Subrata Maity	BJP	BJP
206	Moyna	Purba Medinipur	Ashok Dinda	BJP	BJP
207	Nandakumar	Purba Medinipur	Nirmal Khanra	BJP	BJP
208	Mahishadal	Purba Medinipur	Subhas Chandra Panja	BJP	BJP
209	Haldia (SC)	Purba Medinipur	Pradip Kumar Bijali	BJP	BJP
210	Nandigram	Purba Medinipur	Hasi Rani Rath	BJP	BJP

Prior to delimitation Tamluk Lok Sabha constituency was composed of the following assembly segments: Panskura East (assembly constituency no. 201), Tamluk (assembly constituency no. 202), Moyna (assembly constituency no. 203), Mahisadal (assembly constituency no. 204), Sutahata (SC) (assembly constituency no. 205), Nandigram (assembly constituency no. 206) and Narghat (assembly constituency no. 207).

== Members of Lok Sabha ==
Year	Member	Party
1952	Satish Chandra Samanta	Indian National Congress
1957	Satish Chandra Samanta	Indian National Congress
1962	Satish Chandra Samanta	Indian National Congress
1967	Satish Chandra Samanta	Bangla Congress
1971	Satish Chandra Samanta	Bangla Congress
1977	Sushil Kumar Dhara	Janata Party
1980	Satyagopal Mishra	Communist Party of India (Marxist)
1984	Satyagopal Mishra	Communist Party of India (Marxist)
1989	Satyagopal Mishra	Communist Party of India (Marxist)
1991	Satyagopal Mishra	Communist Party of India (Marxist)
1996	Jayanta Bhattacharya	Indian National Congress
1998	Lakshman Chandra Seth	Communist Party of India (Marxist)
1999	Lakshman Chandra Seth	Communist Party of India (Marxist)
2004	Lakshman Chandra Seth	Communist Party of India (Marxist)
2009	Suvendu Adhikari	Trinamool Congress
2014	Suvendu Adhikari	Trinamool Congress
2016^	Dibyendu Adhikari	Trinamool Congress
2019	Dibyendu Adhikari	Trinamool Congress
2024	Abhijit Gangopadhyay	Bharatiya Janata Party

== Election results ==
Vote share of Winning candidates
2024	48.79%
2019	50.08%
2016 (by-poll)	59.76%
2014	53.57%
2009	55.54%
2004	48.99%
1999	50.04%
1998	51.24%
1996	48.67%
1991	46.16%
1989	50.05%
1984	49.93%
1980	56.98%
1977	61.64%
1971	36.15%
1967	68.47%
1962	53.39%
1957	50.75%
1952	39.59%

=== 2024 ===
2024 Indian general election: Tamluk
Party	Candidate	Votes	%	±%
BJP	Abhijit Gangopadhyay	765,584	48.79	▲11.85
AITC	Debangshu Bhattacharya	687,851	43.84	▼6.24
CPI(M)	Sayan Banerjee	85,389	5.44	▼3.97
AISF	Mohiuddin Ahmed Mahi	12,339	0.79	
NOTA	None of the Above	8,265	0.53	▼0.20
IND	Suryaneel Das	6,014	0.38	
SUCI(C)	Narayan Chandra Nayak	5,682	0.36	
BSP	Sabitri Bishai	3,754	0.24	
IND	Debaprasad Jana	1,467	0.09	
IND	Kalipada Das	974	0.06	
Majority		77,733	4.95	▼8.19
Turnout		1,577,319	85.11	▼0.27
BJP gain from AITC		Swing		

=== 2019 ===
2019 Indian general election: Tamluk
Party	Candidate	Votes	%	±%
AITC	Dibyendu Adhikari	724,433	50.08	▼9.68
BJP	Sidhartha Shankar Naskar	534,268	36.94	▲21.88
CPI(M)	Sheikh Ibrahim Ali	136,129	9.41	▼12.21
INC	Lakshman Chandra Seth	16,001	1.11	▼0.41
NOTA	None of the Above	10,533	0.73	▼0.02
IND	3 Independent Candidates	8,867	0.61	
OTH	5 Other Party Candidates	16,268	1.12	
Majority		190,165	13.14	▼25.00
Turnout		1,446,940	85.38	▲3.34
AITC hold		Swing		

=== 2016 by-election ===
Lok Sabha By-election 2016 : Tamluk
Party	Candidate	Votes	%	±%
AITC	Dibyendu Adhikari	779,594	59.76	▲6.19
CPI(M)	Mandira Panda	2,82,066	21.62	▼13.53
BJP	Prof. Ambujaksha Mahanti	1,96,450	15.06	▲8.61
INC	Batabyal Partha	19,851	1.52	▼0.70
SUCI(C)	Dilip Maiti	10,179	0.78	▲0.02
IND	Dhananjoy Dalai	3,859	0.30	
PDS	Subhrajit Bhaduri	2,718	0.21	
NOTA	None of the above	9,801	0.75	▼0.12
Majority		497,528	38.14	▲19.72
Turnout		13,04,518	82.04	▼5.55
Registered electors		1,590,004		
AITC hold		Swing		

=== 2014 ===
2014 Indian general election: Tamluk
Party	Candidate	Votes	%	±%
AITC	Suvendu Adhikari	716,928	53.57	▼1.97
CPI(M)	Sheikh Ibrahim Ali	470,447	35.15	▼5.32
BJP	Badsha Alam	86,265	6.45	▲4.66
INC	Sk. Anwar Ali	29,645	2.22	
NOTA	None of the Above	11,643	0.87	
SUCI(C)	Bibekananda Ray	10,197	0.76	
BSP	Kamal Bag	3,110	0.23	▼0.28
IUML	Manik Chandra Mondal	1,500	0.11	
IND	Abdur Rezak Sk	1,682	0.13	
IND	Kalisankar Jana	2,658	0.20	
IND	Rajyashree Chaudhuri	3,609	0.27	
Majority		246,481	18.42	▲3.35
Turnout		1,337,684	87.59	▼2.73
AITC hold		Swing		

=== 2009 ===
2009 Indian general election: Tamluk
Party	Candidate	Votes	%	±%
AITC	Suvendu Adhikari	637,664	55.54	▲12.09
CPI(M)	Lakshman Chandra Seth	464,706	40.47	▼8.52
BJP	Rajyashree Chaudhuri	20,573	1.79	
BSP	Manoranjan Mandal	5,891	0.51	▼0.85
AIUDF	Jahed Sek	8,486	0.74	
LJP	Manik Chandra Mondal	2,044	0.18	
IND	Abdur Rejak Seikh	1,456	0.13	
IND	Bhakti Adhikary	1,985	0.17	
IND	Sheikh Nurul Islam	5,401	0.47	
Majority		172,958	15.07	▲9.53
Turnout		1,148,206	90.32	▲3.42
AITC gain from CPI(M)		Swing		

=== 2004 ===
2004 Indian general election: Tamluk
Party	Candidate	Votes	%	±%
CPI(M)	Lakshman Chandra Seth	507,228	48.99	▼1.05
AITC	Suvendu Adhikari	449,848	43.45	▼0.56
INC	Sudarsan Panja	34,794	3.36	▼1.55
BSP	Ajit Das	14,087	1.36	
IND	Manab Bera	13,339	1.29	
IND	Hossain Mahmud Shaikh	6,239	0.60	
SP	Trilochan Kuila	6,082	0.59	
IND	Bhakti Adhikary	3,652	0.35	
Majority		57,380	5.54	▼0.49
Turnout		1,035,269	86.90	▲3.14
CPI(M) hold		Swing		

=== 1999 ===
1999 Indian general election: Tamluk
Party	Candidate	Votes	%	±%
CPI(M)	Lakshman Chandra Seth	455,168	50.04	▼1.20
AITC	Nirmalendu Bhattacharya	400,342	44.01	▲2.21
INC	Manik Bhowmik	44,622	4.91	▼1.16
IND	Srikesh Pramanik	7,623	0.84	
IND	Buddhadeb Jana	1,105	0.12	
IND	Bhakti Adhikari	822	0.09	
Majority		54,826	6.03	▼3.41
Turnout		919,886	83.76	▼2.88
CPI(M) hold		Swing		

=== 1998 ===
1998 Indian general election: Tamluk
Party	Candidate	Votes	%	±%
CPI(M)	Lakshman Chandra Seth	477,516	51.24	▲3.42
AITC	Nirmalendu Bhattacharya	389,564	41.80	
INC	Jayanta Bhattacharya	56,538	6.07	▼42.60
IND	Asutosh Samanta	7,542	0.81	
AJBP	Ananta Kumar Paul	837	0.09	
Majority		87,952	9.44	▲8.59
Turnout		942,965	86.64	▼3.16
CPI(M) gain from INC		Swing		

=== 1996 ===
1996 Indian general election: Tamluk
Party	Candidate	Votes	%	±%
INC	Jayanta Bhattacharya	450,473	48.67	▲2.65
CPI(M)	Lakshman Chandra Seth	442,563	47.82	▲1.66
BJP	Saswati Bag	19,475	2.10	▼2.28
IND	Ashutosh Samanta	10,330	1.12	
IND	Ananta Kumar Das	1,029	0.11	
IND	Muktinath Bag	976	0.11	
IND	Shishir Kumar Panda	669	0.07	
Majority		7,910	0.85	▲0.71
Turnout		938,889	89.80	▲7.48
INC gain from CPI(M)		Swing		

=== 1991 ===
1991 Indian general election: Tamluk
Party	Candidate	Votes	%	±%
CPI(M)	Satyagopal Misra	352,139	46.16	▼3.89
INC	Jayanta Bhattacharya	351,077	46.02	▼0.88
BJP	Bhholanath Dinda	33,425	4.38	▲3.73
IND	Jatin Pakhira	12,640	1.66	
IND	Ashutosh Samanta	12,201	1.60	
DDP	Jagat Sau	1,368	0.18	
Majority		1,062	0.14	▼3.01
Turnout		773,742	82.32	▼3.00
CPI(M) hold		Swing		

=== 1989 ===
1989 Indian general election: Tamluk
Party	Candidate	Votes	%	±%
CPI(M)	Satyagopal Misra	392,393	50.05	▲0.12
INC	Jayanta Bhattacharya	367,737	46.90	▼1.17
IND	Ashuttosh Samanta	12,305	1.57	
BJP	Arun Ghosh	5,100	0.65	
IND	Aloke Das	3,204	0.41	
BSP	Ajit Kumar Das	2,431	0.31	
IND	Dinesh Sarkar	850	0.11	
Majority		24,656	3.15	▲1.29
Turnout		793,885	85.32	▲2.20
CPI(M) hold		Swing		

=== 1984 ===
1984 Indian general election: Tamluk
Party	Candidate	Votes	%	±%
CPI(M)	Satyagopal Misra	313,955	49.93	▼7.05
INC	Saradindu Samanta	302,263	48.07	▲13.87
SUCI(C)	Asutosh Samanta	9,278	1.48	▼0.27
IND	Sridhar Chandra Dolui	1,831	0.29	
IND	Sitangsu Sekhar Das	1,004	0.16	
IND	Swapan Maity	423	0.07	
Majority		11,692	1.86	▼20.92
Turnout		637,176	83.12	▲3.52
CPI(M) hold		Swing		

=== 1980 ===
1980 Indian general election: Tamluk
Party	Candidate	Votes	%	±%
CPI(M)	Satyagopal Misra	307,864	56.98	
INC(I)	Shyam Das Bhattacharyya	184,813	34.20	▲1.33
JP	Paasanta Kumar Gayen	17,097	3.16	▼58.48
JP(S)	Sushil Kumar Dhara	15,509	2.87	
SUCI(C)	Asutosh Samanta	9,435	1.75	▼0.36
IND	Sridhar Chandra Douli	2,694	0.50	
IND	Bhaktipada Mandal	1,637	0.30	
IND	Sitangsu Sekhar Das	1,263	0.23	
Majority		123,051	22.78	▼5.99
Turnout		548,787	79.60	▲9.76
CPI(M) gain from JP		Swing		

=== 1977 ===
1977 Indian general election: Tamluk
Party	Candidate	Votes	%	±%
JP	Sushil Kumar Dhara	254,049	61.64	
INC	Satish Chandra Samanta	135,474	32.87	
IND	Surendra Nath Gharai	13,950	3.38	
SUCI(C)	Asutosh Samanta	8,682	2.11	
Majority		118,575	28.77	▲26.92
Turnout		421,330	69.84	▼4.07
JP gain from Bangla Congress		Swing		

=== 1971 ===
1971 Indian general election: Tamluk
Party	Candidate	Votes	%	±%
BAC	Satish Chandra Samanta	142,294	36.15	▼32.32
CPI	Aruna Asaf Ali	135,023	34.30	
CPI(M)	Satya Gopal Misra	58,872	14.96	
INC(O)	Subodh Chandra Maiti	53,456	13.58	
IND	Gobinda Bhowmik	3,988	1.01	
Majority		7,271	1.85	▼35.09
Turnout		408,393	73.91	▼6.84
Bangla Congress hold		Swing		

=== 1967 ===
1967 Indian general election: Tamluk
Party	Candidate	Votes	%	±%
BAC	Satish Chandra Samanta	278,623	68.47	
INC	G. Bhowmik	128,299	31.53	▼21.86
Majority		150,324	36.94	▲26.60
Turnout		416,203	80.75	▲7.57
Bangla Congress gain from INC		Swing		

=== 1962 ===
1962 Indian general election: Tamluk
Party	Candidate	Votes	%	±%
INC	Satish Chandra Samanta	189,020	53.39	▲2.64
AIFB	Gobinda Chandra Bhowmick	152,399	43.05	▼0.57
HM	Suryya Kumar Chakravartty	12,615	3.56	▼2.07
Majority		36,621	10.34	▲3.21
Turnout		364,835	73.18	▲3.39
INC hold		Swing		

=== 1957 ===
1957 Indian general election: Tamluk
Party	Candidate	Votes	%	±%
INC	Satish Chandra Samanta	158,464	50.75	▲11.16
FB(MG)	Gobinda Chandra Bhowmik	136,190	43.62	▲15.85
HM	Suryya Kumar Chakravarty	17,582	5.63	
Majority		22,274	7.13	▲0.17
Turnout		312,236	69.79	▲1.77
INC hold		Swing		

=== 1952 ===
1952 Indian general election: Tamluk
Party	Candidate	Votes	%	±%
INC	Satish Chandra Samanta	101,109	39.59	
KMPP	Hrishikesh Tripati	83,340	32.63	
FB(MG)	Gobinda Chandra Bhowmik	70,930	27.77	
Majority		17,769	6.96	
Turnout		255,379	68.02	
INC win (new seat)				

== See also ==
- List of constituencies of the Lok Sabha
