= Tamluk High School =

Location
- Tamluk, West Bengal, 721636; India; 22.2899027°N 87.920369°E

Information
- School district: Purba Medinipur
- Campus type: Urban

Tamluk High School, is a higher secondary school located in Tamluk, Purba Medinipur, West Bengal, India.

== About School ==
The school was established in 1856. It follows the course curricula of West Bengal Board of Secondary Education (WBBSE) and West Bengal Council of Higher Secondary Education (WBCHSE) for Standard 10th and 12th Board examinations respectively.

== See also ==
- Education in India
- List of schools in India
- Education in West Bengal
