= Satyagopal Misra =

Indian politician

Member of Parliament, Lok Sabha
- In office 1980–1996
- Preceded by: Sushil Kumar Dhara
- Succeeded by: Jayanta Bhattacharya
- Constituency: Tamluk

Personal details
- Born: 12 August 1939 Kalyanchak, Midnapore, Bengal Presidency, British India
- Died: 24 May 2013 (aged 73) Rabindranath Tagore International Institute of Cardiac Sciences, Kolkata, West Bengal, India
- Party: CPI(M)
- Children: Two sons and one daughter

Satyagopal Misra was an Indian politician belonging to the Communist Party of India (Marxist). He was elected to the Lok Sabha, the lower house of the Parliament of India from Tamluk in 1980, 1984, 1989 and 1991.
