= Matangini Hazra =

Indian freedom fighter (1870-1942)

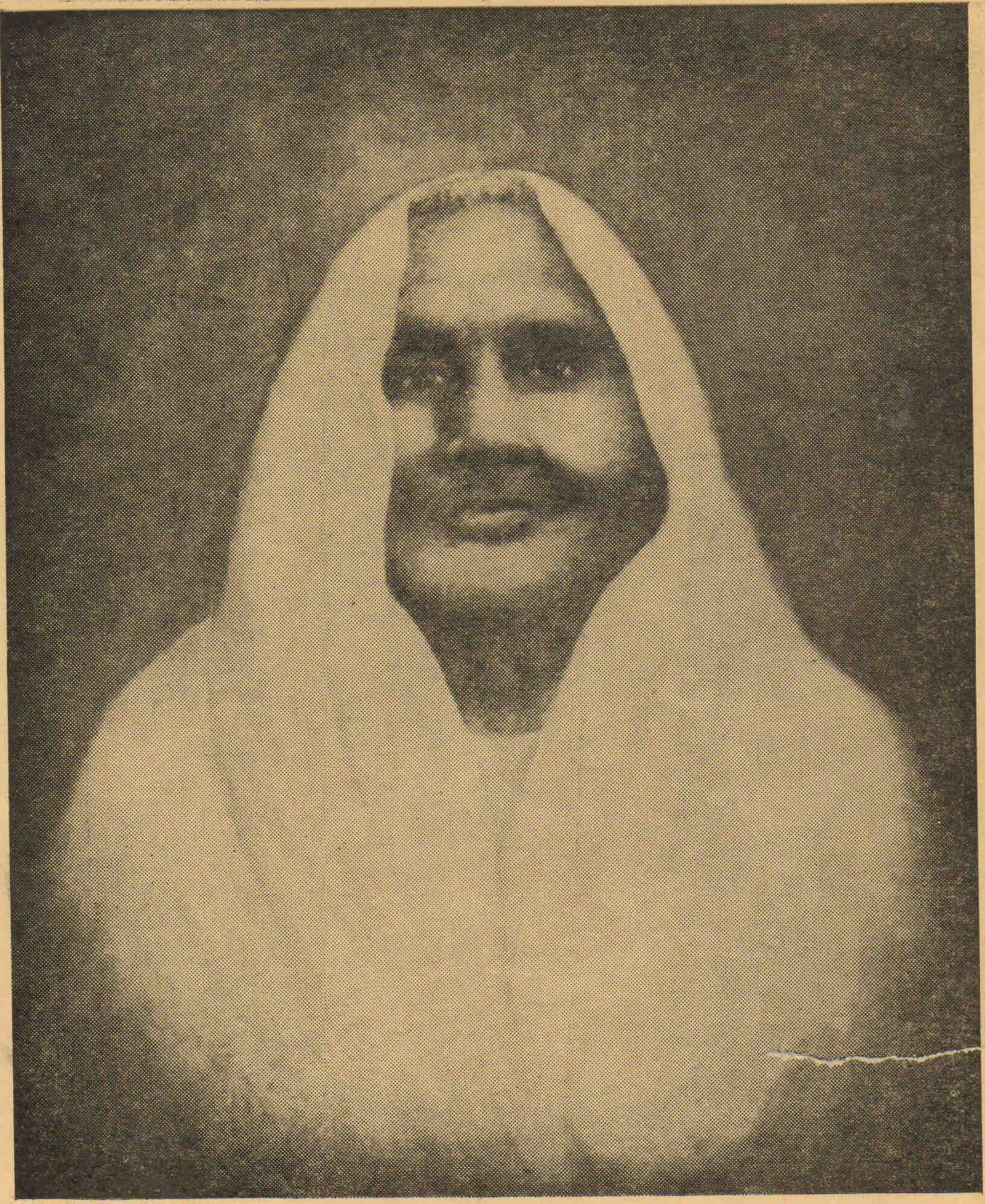
- Born: Matangini Maity; 19 October 1870; Tamluk, Bengal Presidency, British India (now Tamluk, Purba Medinipur, West Bengal, India)
- Died: 29 September 1942 (aged 71); Tamluk, Bengal Presidency, British India (now Tamluk, Purba Medinipur, West Bengal, India)
- Cause of death: Assassination
- Known for: Humanitarian; Activist and Martyr in the Indian independence movement
- Movement: Civil Disobedience movement Chowkidari tax bandha movement Quit India movement
- Spouse: Trilochan Hazra
- Father: Thakurdas Maity

Matangini Hazra (19 October 1870 – 29 September 1942) was an Indian revolutionary who participated in the Indian independence movement. She was leading one of the five batches of volunteers (of the Vidyut Bahini), constituted by the Samar Parisad (War Council), at Tamluk to capture the Tamluk Police Station on 29 September 1942, when she was shot dead by the British Indian police in front of the police station, becoming the first "Quit India" movement martyr in Midnapore. She was a staunch Gandhian and was fondly called Gandhi buri, Bengali for "old lady Gandhi".

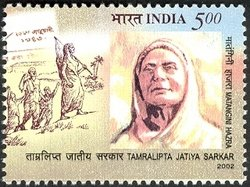
Matangini Hazra on a stamp of India celebrating 60 years of Tamralipta Jatiya Sarkar

== Early life ==
Not much is known of her early life apart from that she was born in a Bengali Mahishya family of village Hogla, near Tamluk on 19 October, 1870, and that because she was the daughter of a poor peasant, she did not receive a formal education. She married Trilochan Hazra when she was twelve and was widowed at the age of eighteen without children. Her father-in-law's village was Alinan, of Tamluk thana.

== Participation in the freedom movement ==
Matangini Hazra became actively interested in the Indian independence movement as a Gandhian. A notable feature of the freedom struggle in Midnapore was the participation of women. In 1930, she took part in the Civil Disobedience movement and was arrested for breaking the Salt Act. She was promptly released, but then participated in the 'Chowkidari Tax Bandha' (abolition of chowkidari tax) movement and while marching towards the court building chanting slogan to protest against the illegal constitution of a court by the governor to punish those who participated in the movement, Matangini was arrested again. She was sentenced to six months imprisonment and sent to Baharampur jail. Again, she was incarcerated for six months at Baharampur. After being released, she became an active member of the Indian National Congress and took to spinning her own Khadi. In 1933, she attended the subdivisional Congress conference at Serampore and was injured in the ensuing baton charge by the police.

== Social work ==
In 1930s, despite her meagre physical state, Hazra went back to her social work immediately after her release from prison to help untouchables. Always engaged in humanitarian causes, she worked among affected men, women and children when smallpox in epidemic form broke out in the region.

== Involvement in the Quit India Movement ==
As part of the Quit India Movement, members of the Congress planned to take over the various police stations of Medinipore district and other government offices. This was to be a step in overthrowing the British government in the district and establishing an independent Indian state. Hazra, who was 72 years at the time, led a procession of six thousand supporters, mostly women volunteers, with the purpose of taking over the Tamluk police station. When the procession reached the outskirts of the town, they were ordered to disband under Section 144 of the Indian Penal Code by the Crown police. As she stepped forward, Hazra was shot once. Apparently, she had stepped forward and appealed to the police not to open fire at the crowd. The Biplabi newspaper of the parallel Tamluk National Government commented:

Matangini led one procession from the north of the criminal court building; even after the firing commenced, she continued to advance with the tri-colour flag, leaving all the volunteers behind. The police shot her three times. She continued marching despite wounds to the forehead and both hands.

As she was repeatedly shot, she kept chanting Vande Mataram, "hail to the Motherland". She died with the tricolour flag held high and still flying.

== Legacy ==
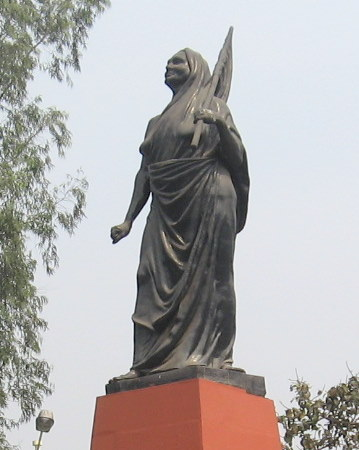
Statue of Hazra on the Maidan at Kolkata

The parallel Tamluk Government (Tamralipta Jatiya Sarkar) incited open rebellion by praising her "martyrdom for her country" and was able to function for two more years, until it was disbanded in 1944, at Gandhi's request.

India earned Independence in 1947 and numerous schools, colonies, and streets, including the long stretch of Hazra Road in Kolkata, were named after Hazra. The first statue of a woman put up in Kolkata in independent India was Hazra's in 1977. A statue now stands at the spot where she was killed in Tamluk.

In 2002, as part of a series of postage stamps commemorating sixty years of the Quit India Movement and the formation of the Tamluk National Government, the Department of Post of India issued a five rupee postage stamp with Matangini Hazra's portrait. In 2015, the Shahid Matangini Hazra Government College for Women was established in Tamluk, Purba Medinipur.

== See also ==
- Sahid Matangini (community development block)
- Sahid Matangini railway station
