= Sushil Kumar Dhara =

Indian revolutionary leader and politician

Member of Parliament, Lok Sabha
- In office 1977–1980
- Preceded by: Satish Chandra Samanta
- Succeeded by: Satyagopal Mishra
- Constituency: Tamluk

Member of West Bengal Legislative Assembly
- In office 1962–1971
- Preceded by: Prafulla Chandra Ghosh; Mahtab Chand Das
- Succeeded by: Ahindra Mishra
- Constituency: Mahisadal

Personal details
- Born: 2 March 1911 Mahisadal, Bengal Presidency, British India (now Mahisadal, West Bengal, India)
- Died: 28 January 2011 (aged 99) Mahisadal, West Bengal, India
- Party: Janata Party
- Other political affiliations: Bangla Congress; Indian National Congress
- Occupation: Freedom Fighter, Elected Official

Sushil Kumar Dhara (2 March 1911 – 28 January 2011) was a revolutionary in British India and a political leader after Indian Independence in 1947.

== Early life ==
Dhara was born on 2 March 1911 in Tikarampur (near Tamluk) in Mahisadal in the present Purba Medinipur district into a Hindu Mahishya family. He was involved in political activities from his school days. He studied at the prestigious Hamilton High School in Tamluk and subsequently, completed his education from Vidyasagar College in 1937. Later, in 1940, he participated in the Satyagraha movement of Gandhi. In August 1942, he played the lead role in launching an anti-British movement in undivided Midnapore along with Satish Chandra Samanta and Ajoy Mukherjee. The movement helped to free Tamralipta from British rule and a free government was formed in this region on 17 December 1942. Vidyut Bahini, the armed unit of the parallel Government of Tamluk was also commanded by him. As a member of Tamralipta Jatiya Sarkar, which is better known as Tamralipta National Government, formed during the Movement of 1942, Dhara held the portfolios of War and Home. He was a highly revered figure and was given the honorific epithet of "Gana nayak", roughly translating to "People's leader". During the period of British governance, Dhara spent 12 years and 4 months in prison.

== Political career ==
After independence of India, Dhara won several elections, which included the Mahisadal constituency of West Bengal Assembly in 1962, 1967 and 1969. In 1962, he was the winner of the Assembly poll as an Indian National Congress candidate. He also established the Bangla Congress in 1966. In 1967, the then Chief Minister of West Bengal Prafulla Chandra Sen was defeated at Arambagh by another Gandhian Ajoy Mukherjee, who became Chief Minister of West Bengal, after Prafulla Chandra Sen. Architect of Ajoy Mukherjee's victory at Arambagh was Narayan Chandra Ghosh, who was the then student's leader there. Dhara had inspired students of Arambagh unfolding his image as commander of Vidyut Bahini. In 1967, he had won the poll as a candidate of Bangla Congress. He also served in the state government as Minister of Industry and Commerce in the Second Mukherjee ministry. He had published a book titled Ken ei banya written by Narayan Chandra Ghosh for circulation in the lower Damodar Basin. Reading noted book people there were very much agitated and took effective role against Congress. Later, Ajoy Mukherjee with some of his closest colleagues, such as Pranab Mukherjee, joined Indian National Congress leaving Dhara - his long term associates. Ajoy Mukherjee had pushed Pranab Mukherjee to be State Minister in the Indian Cabinet. In 1977, from the Tamluk Assembly constituency. Dhara was elected to the Lok Sabha as a candidate of the Janata Party.

Dhara stepped back from politics in the 1980s and involved himself in social work. He died on 28 January 2011, at the age of 99, owing to prolonged sickness.
