= Satish Chandra Samanta =

Indian politician

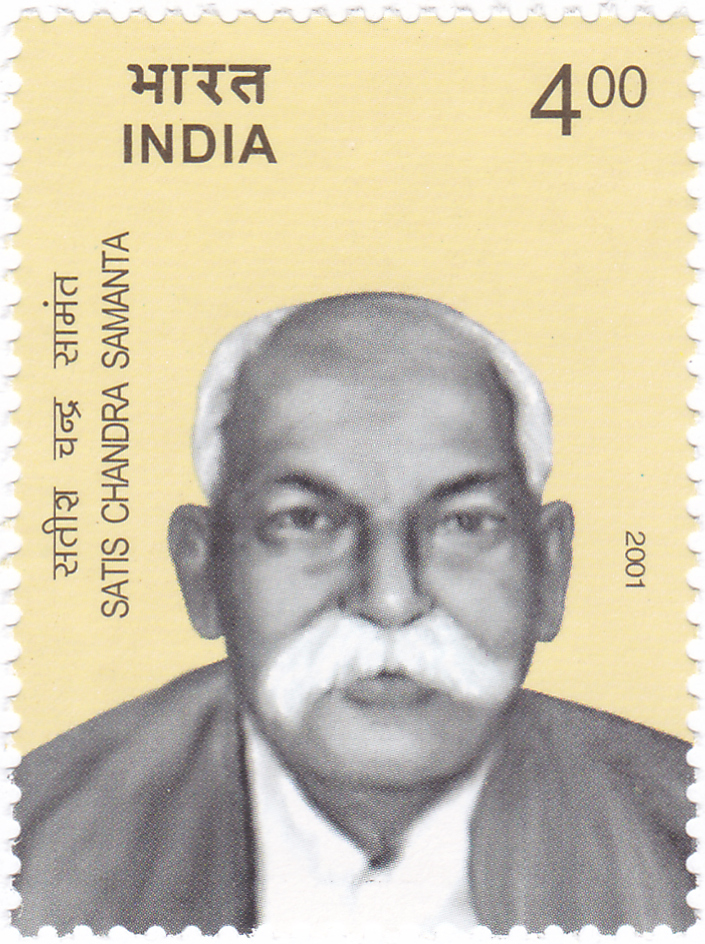
- Satish Chandra Samanta on a 2001 stamp of India

Member of Parliament, Lok Sabha
- In office 1952–1977
- Preceded by: Office established
- Succeeded by: Sushil Kumar Dhara
- Constituency: Tamluk

Chief Executive (Sarbadhinayak) of Tamralipta Jatiya Sarkar
- In office 17 December 1942 – June 1943

Personal details
- Born: 15 December 1900
- Died: 4 June 1983 (aged 82) Mahisadal, West Bengal, India
- Occupation: Indian independence movement activist and political leader

Satish Chandra Samanta (15 December 1900 – 4 June 1983) was an Indian independence movement activist and a member of the Lok Sabha from 1952 to 1977.

== Early life and education ==
Satish Chandra Samanta was born at Gopalpur village, Mahishadal thana of Purba Medinipur district in a Mahishya family. At the age of 15 he was influenced by his guru, Swami Prajnanananda Saraswati and adopted the life of Brahmacharya and took up a life of serving the people.

He displayed academic prowess since an early age, his schooling was in Mahishadal raj high school, where he passed in the first division at the Matriculation examination. He passed IA from Bangabasi College and subsequently entered the Bengal Engineering college to pursue Engineering.

== Nationalist movement and politics ==
Samanta quit Bengal Engineering College (now Indian Institute of Engineering Science and Technology, Shibpur) in his second year of study in order to fight for freedom of India from the clutches of the British. He started serving through, the activities organised by the local branch of the Indian National Congress. Later, he became the president of Tamluk Congress Committee and remained an active congress member for decades. He was known for his leadership qualities and other constructive work. His leadership qualities could be observed during the formation of a parallel government named Tamralipta Jatiya Sarkar (Tamralipta National Government) in Tamluk during the Quit India Movement. This body was formed on 17 December 1942 and Samanta was the "Sarbadhinayak" (Chief Executive) of this government until his arrest in June 1943. It lasted till September 1944. It undertook cyclone relief work, gave grants to schools and organized an armed Vidyut Vahini.

In addition to his political work, he helped the people by participating in activities related to improving civic health. He organised and led activities like cleaning roads and choked-up ponds to prevent malaria, nursing cholera patients, organising free medical camps, training volunteers and spreading education and literacy in backward areas. After Independence, Satish Chandra Samanta remained as a Member of Parliament for more than three decades. He was elected to the 1st Lok Sabha from Tamluk constituency in 1952 and re-elected to the Lok Sabha from the same constituency in 1957, 1962, 1967 and 1971.
