= Tamralipta Jatiya Sarkar =

Independent parallel national government (1942-1944)

Tamralipta Jatiya Sarkar তাম্রলিপ্ত জাতীয় সরকার
- Independent parallel government
- Formation: 17 December 1942
- Extinction: 8 August 1944
- Territory: Tamluk and Contai

Executive branch
- Sarbadhinayak: Satish Chandra Samanta

The Tamralipta Jatiya Sarkar (Bengali : তাম্রলিপ্ত জাতীয় সরকার) or Tamluk National Government was an independent parallel government during the Quit India Movement (1942–1944). It was established in the areas of Tamluk and Contai subdivisions, now in Purba Medinipur, West Bengal, India. It was the first people's government in British India and existed for almost two years, until the end of the British Raj.

== History ==
Tamralipta Jatiya Sarkar was founded on 17 December 1942 by Satish Chandra Samanta, who was the supreme leader until his arrest in June 1943. He was aided by several ministers and protagonists like Sushil Kumar Dhara, Ajoy Mukherjee and Matangini Hazra. The parallel government had set up police stations, military departments, courts and revenue collection system, and had completely overthrown the civil government of the British by dispensing justice, maintaining peace and security, and helping the poor and the distressed. It was dismantled on 8 August 1944 at the instance of Mahatma Gandhi.

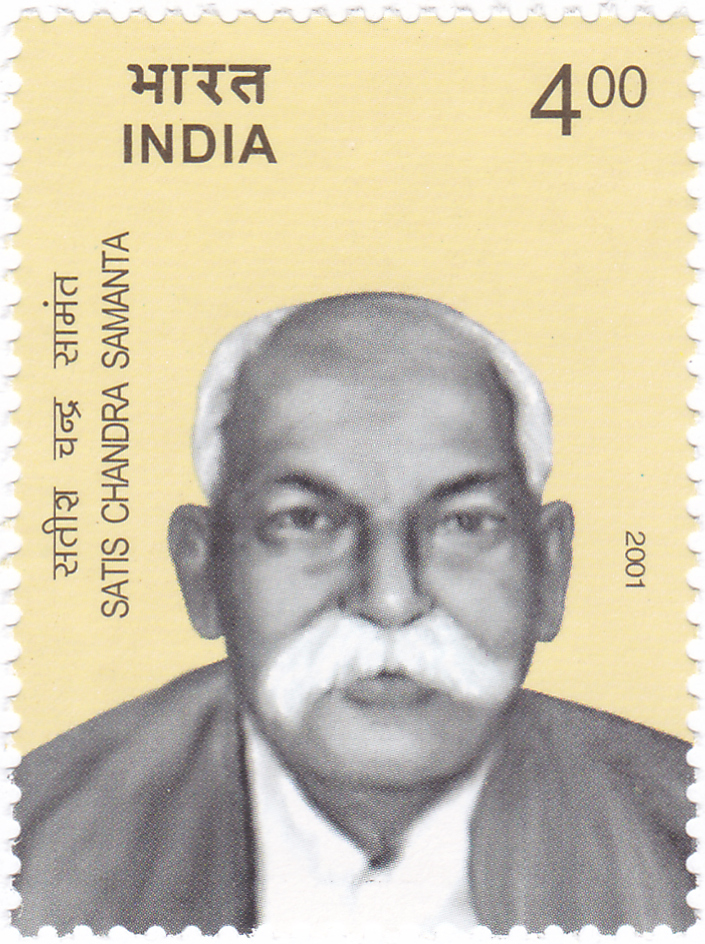
Satish Chandra Samanta, the Sarbadhinayak of the parallel national government

The rebels of Midnapore were inspired by Gandhi, but they did not confine themselves to the Gandhian practice of non-violence. It was not Gandhi's ahimsa which moved the rebels so much as his precept 'do or die'. A good deal of underground literature (including that of the Biplabi, the mouthpiece of the Tamralipta Jatiya Sarkar) cropped up with that precept as the motto. The Jatiya Sarkar launched an armed militia, Bidyut Bāhini (বিদ্যুৎ বাহিনী), commanded by Sushil Kumar Dhara, in the hope of helping Subhas Bose's Indian National Army, should it succeed in invading British-held Bengal (it didn't).

== Legacy ==
In 2002, the Atal Bihari Bajpayee-led Ministry of Communication of India released a Tamralipta Jatiya Sarkar commemorative stamp. The stamp depicts Ajoy Mukherjee, who became the Chief Minister of West Bengal three times, and Matangini Hazra who laid down her life during the march.
