= Haldia railway station =

Railway station in West Bengal, India

Haldia

General information
- Location: Panskura–Tamluk Road, Haldia, Purba Medinipur; India
- Coordinates: 22°02′42″N 88°03′56″E
- Elevation: 2 metres (6.6 ft)
- System: Kolkata Suburban Railway station
- Owner: Indian Railways
- Operator: South Eastern Railway zone
- Line: Panskura–Haldia branch line
- Platforms: 2
- Tracks: 3

Construction
- Structure type: At grade
- Parking: No
- Cycle facilities: Yes

Other information
- Status: Functioning
- Station code: HLZ
- Zone(s): South Eastern Railway
- Division(s): Kharagpur

History
- Opened: 1968
- Electrified: 1974–76

Services
Preceding station	Kolkata Suburban Railway	Following station
Terminus	South Eastern Line Panskura–Haldia line	Bandar towards Howrah Junction
Route map
Location
- Location within West Bengal Location within India

Haldia is a terminal railway station on the Panskura–Haldia branch line and is located in Purba Medinipur district in the Indian state of West Bengal. It serves Haldia industrial area.

== History ==
The Howrah–Kharagpur line was opened in 1865.

The Panskura–Durgachak line was opened in 1968, at a time when Haldia Port was being constructed. It was subsequently extended to Haldia.

== Electrification ==
The Howrah–Kharagpur line was electrified in 1967–69. The Panskura–Haldia line was electrified in 1974–76.

== New line ==
Indian Railways propose to lay a new line connecting Sealdah and Haldia, with the distance being shorter by 70 km than the Howrah–Haldia track.
