= Jalalsi railway station =

Railway station in West Bengal

Jalalsi

General information
- Location: Amta–Munsirhat Road, Palgusti, Howrah district, West Bengal; India
- Coordinates: 22°35′18″N 88°03′28″E
- Elevation: 3 metres (9.8 ft)
- System: Suburban rail station
- Owner: Indian Railways
- Operator: South Eastern Railway zone
- Line: Santragachi–Amta branch line
- Platforms: 1
- Tracks: 1

Construction
- Structure type: Standard (on-ground station)

Other information
- Status: Functioning
- Station code: JLI
- Zone(s): South Eastern Railway zone
- Division(s): Kharagpur

History
- Opened: 1897
- Closed: 1971
- Rebuilt: 2004
- Former names: Howrah–Amta Light Railway

Services
Preceding station	Kolkata Suburban Railway	Following station
Harishdadpur towards Amta	South Eastern Line Santragachi–Amta branch line	Maju towards Howrah Junction
Route map
- Source: Google Maps
Location
- Location within West Bengal Location within India

Jalalsi railway station is a railway station on Santragachi–Amta branch line of South Eastern Railway section of the Kharagpur railway division. It is situated beside Amta-Munshirhat Road at Palgusti in Howrah district in the Indian state of West Bengal.

== History ==
Howrah to Amta narrow-gauge track was built in 1897 in British India. This route was the part of the Martin's Light Railways which was closed in 1971. Howrah–Amta new broad-gauge line, including the Bargachia–Champadanga branch line was re constructed and opened in 2002–2004.
