= Garbalia =

- Village
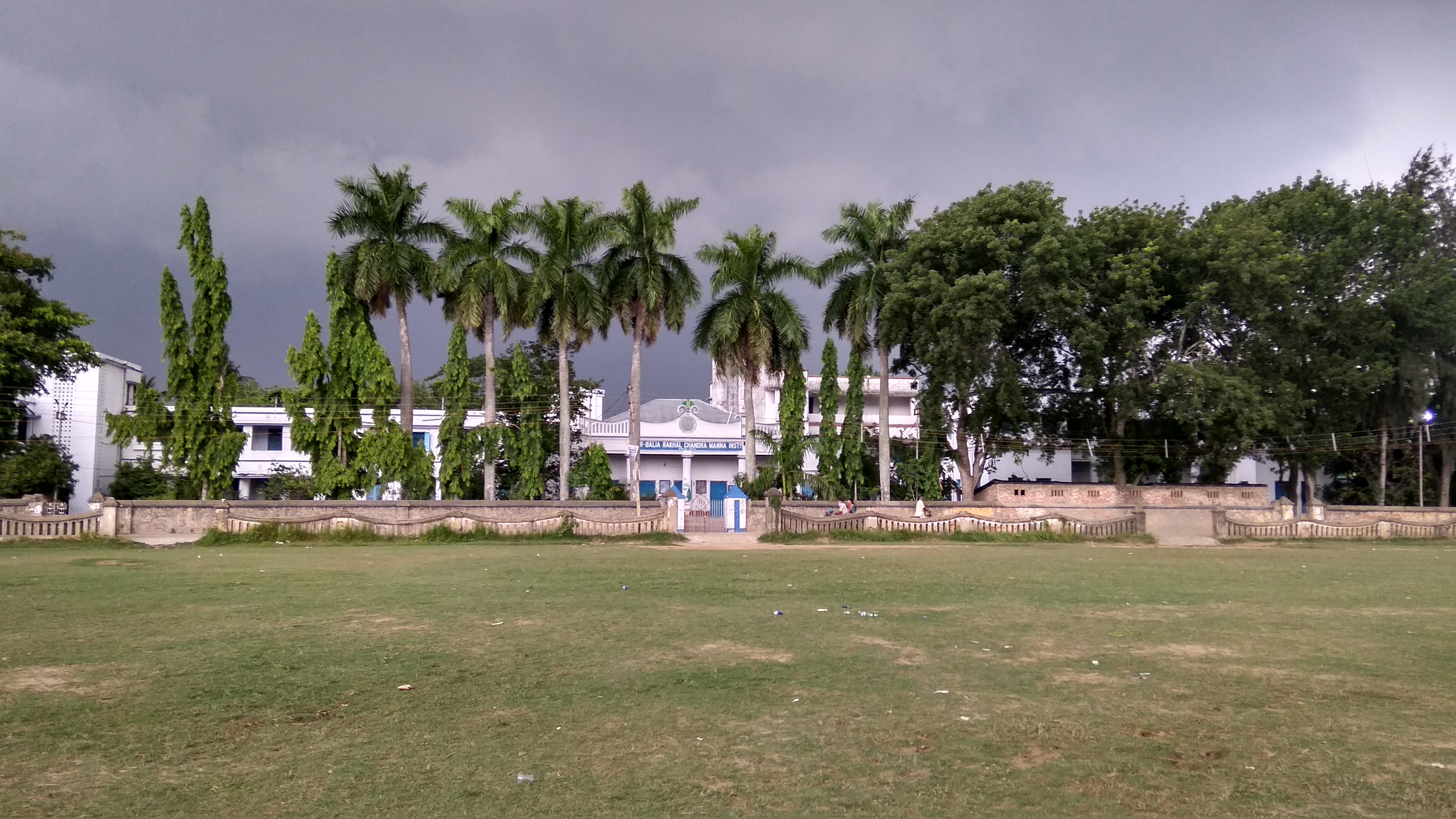
- Garbalia Rakhal Chandra Manna Institution's playground, with Garbalia Rakhal Chandra Manna Institution in the background

- Location in West Bengal, India Garbalia (India)
- Coordinates: 22.632568°N 88.113055°E
- Country: India
- States: West Bengal
- District: Howrah
- Elevation: 8 m (26 ft)

Languages
  - Official: Bengali, English
- Time zone: UTC+5:30 (IST)
- PIN: 711410
- Telephone Code: 913214
- ISO 3166 code: IN-WB
- Vehicle registration: WB-xx xxx
- Literacy Rate: 83.85%
- Lok Sabha constituency: Sreerampur
- Vidhan Sabha constituency: Jagatballavpur
- Website: howrah.gov.in

Garbalia is a village in Howrah district of West Bengal, India. It is a part of the Jagatballavpur block in the Howrah Sadar subdivision in the north-eastern part of Howrah. Garbalia is 30 km from the state's capital, Kolkata. Garbalia along with its 11 other neighbouring villages - Ichhapur, Tripurapur, Kumarpur, North Sealdanga, South Sealdanga, Jamunabalia, Badebalia, Ranmahal, Nimabalia, Nijbalia and Pratappur are together called greater Balia Pargana.

Garbalia is located at 22.632568°N 88.113055°E. The PIN code of Garbalia is 711410.

== Transport ==
Garbalia is connected with Grand Trunk Road by Howrah-Amta Road and it is also connected with Kona Expressway (Mumbai-Kolkata Highway) by Pantihal-Dhulagarh Road. Garbalia is connected with South-Eastern Railway by Howrah-Amta Local Railway.

=== Train ===
Howrah-Amta Local (From Pantihal, Munsirhat or Bargachia Station). Garbalia is approximately 3.1 km away from Pantihal railway station, 4.0 km away from Munsirhat railway station and 7.0 km away from Bargachia railway station.

=== Other Transportation Services ===
Munsirhat-Sankrail trekker route, khadarghat-Santoshpur Auto rickshaw route and numerous other transportation systems are also available in Garbalia.

== Education ==
Garbalia Rakhal Chandra Manna Institution (founded in 1937) is the only higher secondary School in Balia Pargana and second oldest secondary and oldest higher secondary school in Jagatballavpur Block. There is also a secondary girls' school in Balia Pargana-Garbalia Girls' High School. Both schools are located at Ichapur. There are also numerous Primary Schools in Balia Pargana. The nearest college is Sovarani Memorial College which is located at Jagatballavpur.

== Healthcare facilities ==
The nearest primary block level hospital is located at Jagatballavpur. Numerous other rural health centers and medicine stores are also present in Balia Pargana.

== Post offices ==
Balia Pargana consists of three post offices, which are Garbalia, Nijbalia and Sealdanga. Among them the Nizbalia post office belongs to Pantihal Panchayat and the rests belong to Sealdanga Panchayat.

== Festivals ==
Garbalia or Balia Pargana is famous for "Kalipuja" or Diwali festival. "Durgapuja", "Swaraswatipuja", "Christmas", "Eid", "Holi" are also quiet popular in Balia Pargana. Both Bengali new year or Pahela Baishakh and New Year's Eve are celebrated in Balia Pargana. National holidays like Independence Day, Republic Day and Gandhi Jayanti and birthdays of famous national heroes are also celebrated in Balia Pargana. Various other local festivals and fairs also take places in Balia Pargana which draw huge crowds.
