= Baltikuri railway station =

Railway station in West Bengal

Baltikuri

General information
- Location: Baltikuri, Howrah, West Bengal; India
- Coordinates: 22°36′33″N 88°17′46″E
- Elevation: 5 metres (16 ft)
- System: Kolkata Suburban Railway
- Owner: Indian Railways
- Operator: South Eastern Railway zone
- Line: Santragachi–Amta branch line
- Tracks: 2

Construction
- Structure type: Standard (on ground station)

Other information
- Status: Functioning
- Station code: BALT
- Zone(s): South Eastern Railway zone
- Division(s): Kharagpur

History
- Opened: 1897
- Closed: 1971
- Rebuilt: 2004
- Former names: Howrah–Amta Light Railway

Services
Preceding station	Kolkata Suburban Railway	Following station
Kona towards Amta	South Eastern Line Santragachi–Amta branch line	Bankranayabaz towards Howrah Junction
Bhattanagar towards Sealdah	Chord link Line	Bankranayabaz towards Andul
Route map
- Source: Google Maps
Location
- Location within Kolkata Location within West Bengal Location within India

Baltikuri railway station is a cabin railway station on Santragachi–Amta branch line of South Eastern Railway section of the Kharagpur railway division. It is situated at Baltikuri in Howrah in the Indian state of West Bengal.

== History ==
Howrah to Amta narrow-gauge track was built in 1897 in British India. This route was the part of the Martin's Light Railways which was closed in 1971. Howrah–Amta new broad-gauge line, including the Bargachia–Champadanga branch line was re constructed and opened in 2002–2004. The station has no platform.

== Non-Government Organizations ==
Margastha Research Foundation is the active NGO of this area. The organization is working on environment conservation, awareness program, skill development program. This is the first organisation of this area that run Internship programs on several nature and tech related fields.
