= Chamrail =

- Census Town
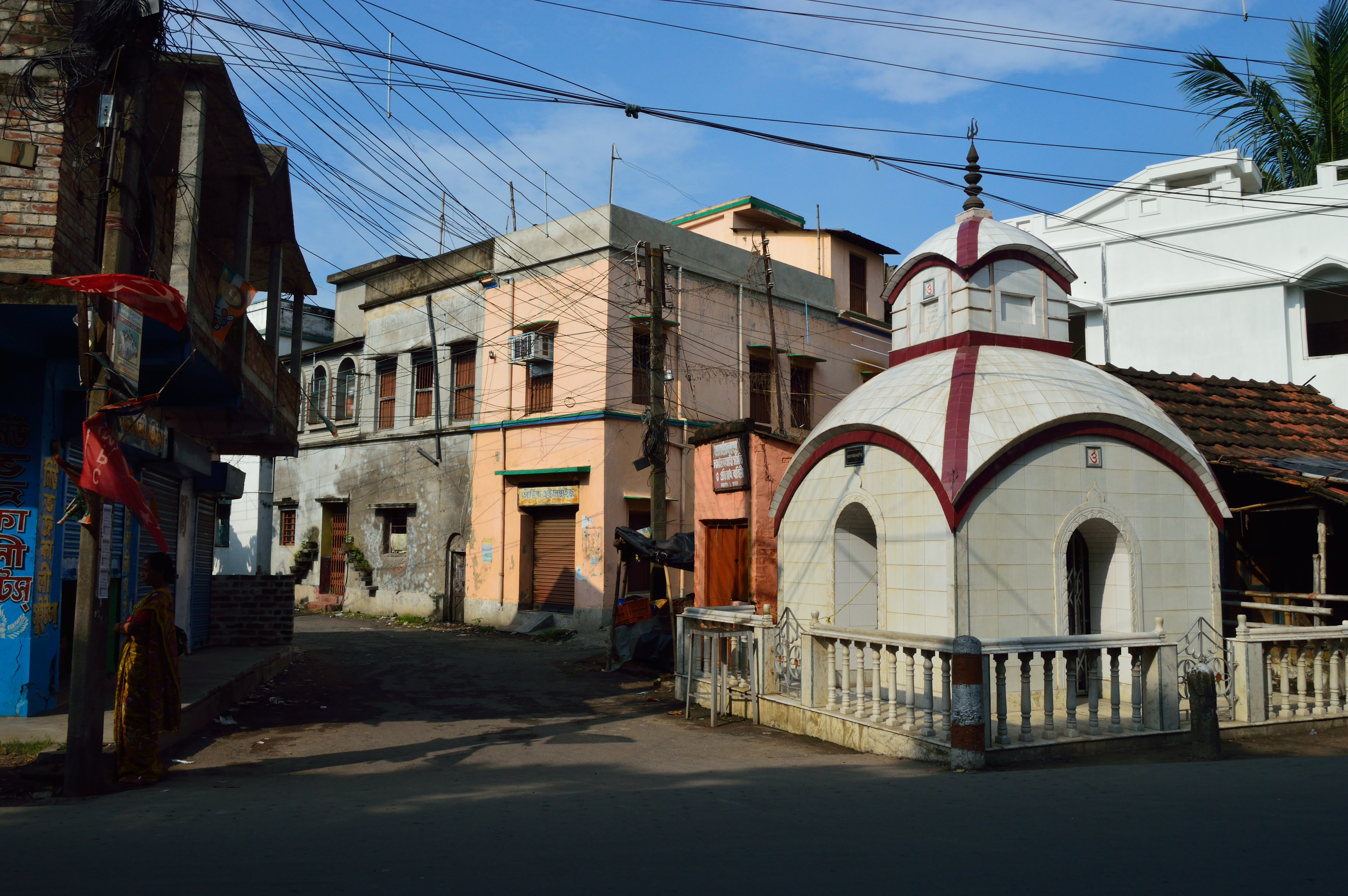
- Local Lane and Baba Panchananda Mandir, Benaras Road, Chamrail

- Location in West Bengal, India Chamrail (West Bengal) Chamrail (India)
- Coordinates: 22.63°N 88.30°E
- Country: India
- State: West Bengal
- District: Howrah

Population (2011)
  - Total: 11,923

Languages
  - Official: Bengali, English
- Time zone: UTC+5:30 (IST)
- PIN: 711114
- Vehicle registration: WB
- Lok Sabha constituency: Sreerampur
- Vidhan Sabha constituency: Domjur
- Website: howrah.gov.in

Chamrail is a census town in Bally Jagachha CD Block of Howrah Sadar subdivision in Howrah district in the Indian state of West Bengal.

Chamrail is under the jurisdiction of Liluah Police Station of Howrah City Police.

Chamrail is famous for the historical Brambha Vishnu Maheshwara puja. This puja was established in the year 1889 by Khetra Mohan Chakraborty and after this legacy was continued by his son Narayan Chandra Chakraborty. Now this historical puja is continued by Harisabha Committee.

== Geography ==
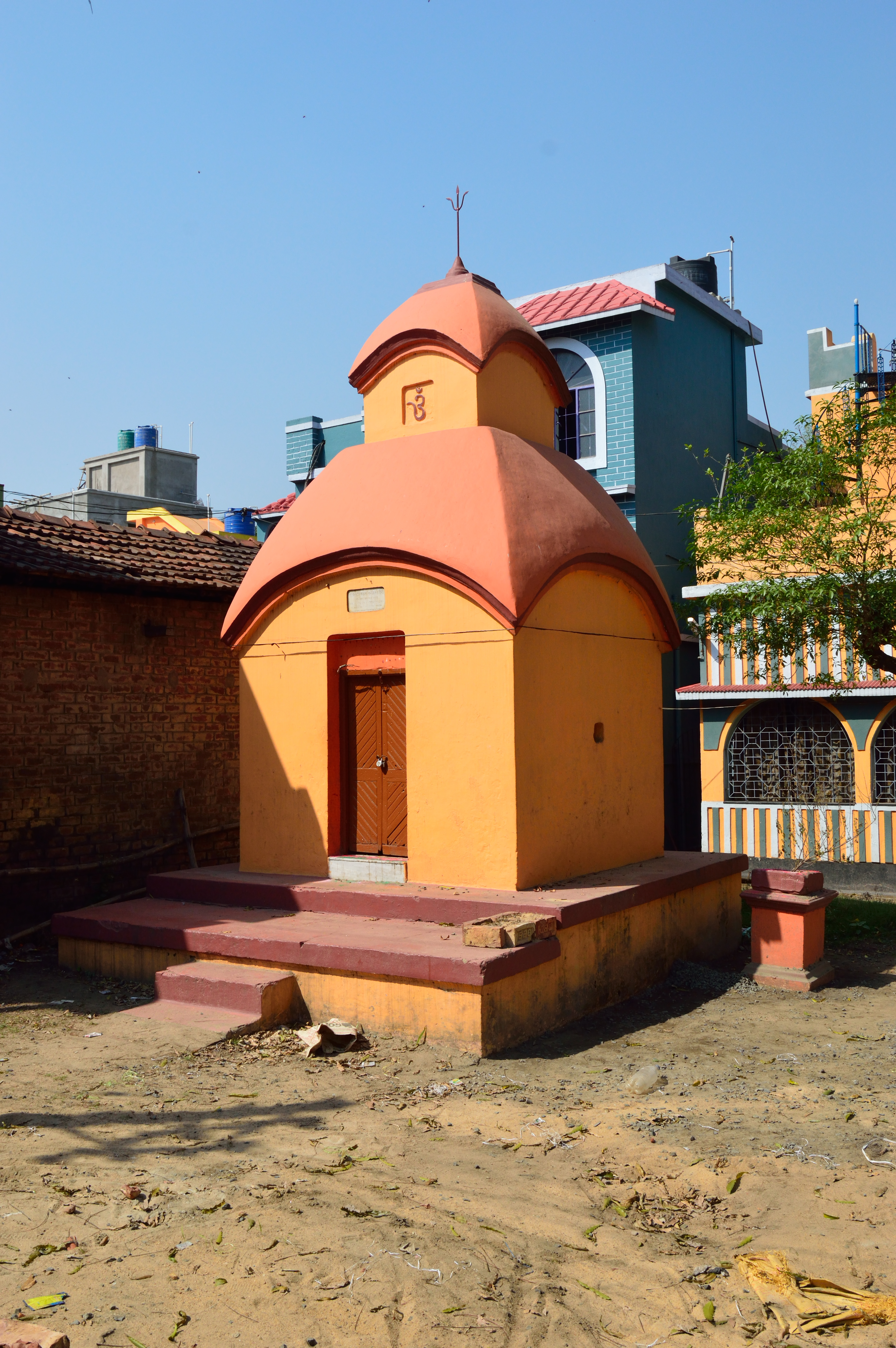
Ambikeswar Shiva Mandir, .Chamrail

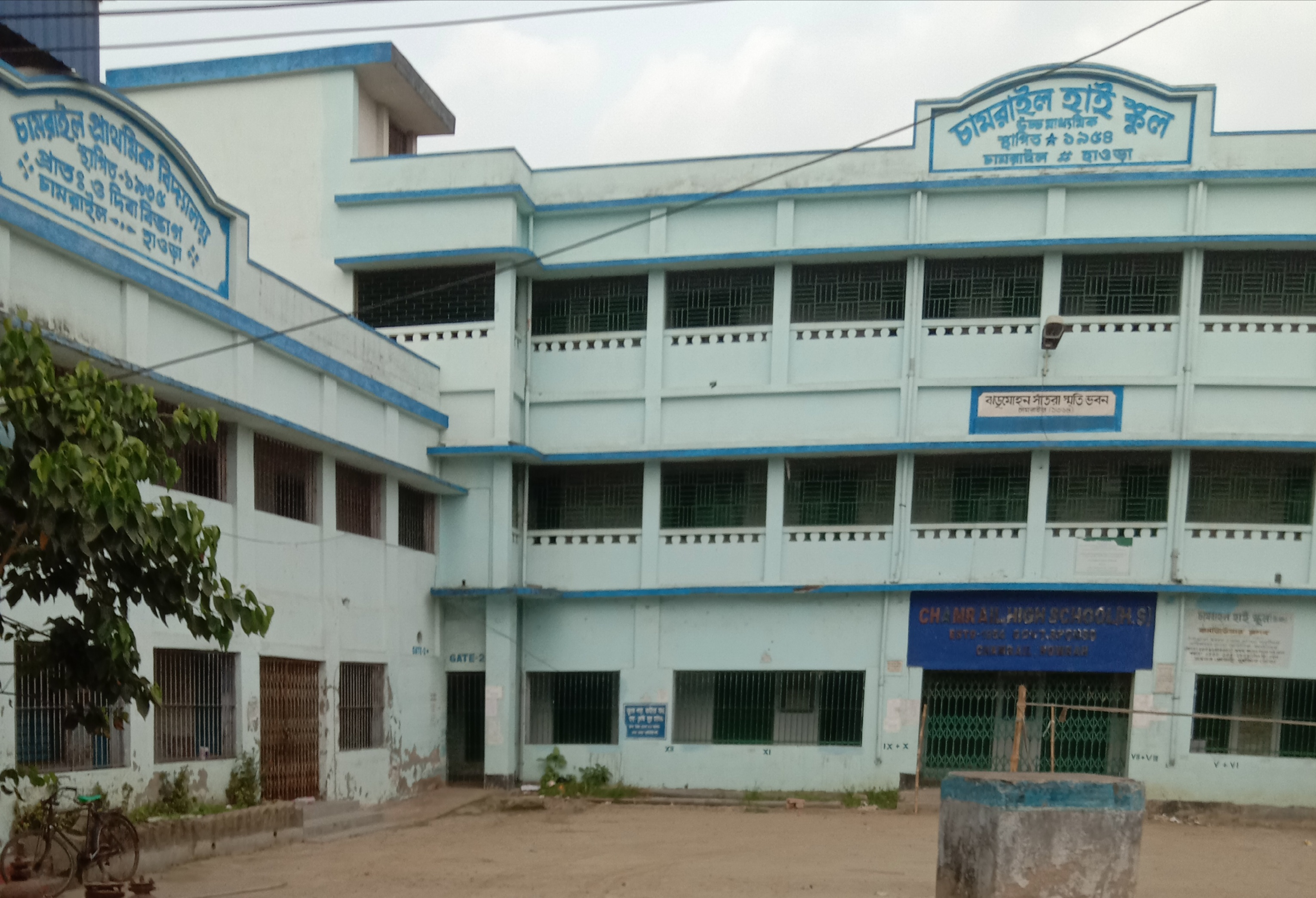
Chamrail High School

Chamrail is located at 22.63°N 88.30°E. It is situated between Eksara and Jagadishpur.

== Demographics ==
As per 2011 Census of India, Chamrail had a total population of 11,923 of which 6,083 (51%) were males and 5,840 (49%) were females. Population below 6 years was 1,197. The total number of literates in Chamrail was 9,278 (86.50% of the population over 6 years).

As of 2001 India census, Chamrail had a population of 8554. Males constitute 51% of the population and females 49%. Chamrail has an average literacy rate of 76%, higher than the national average of 59.5%; with male literacy of 81% and female literacy of 71%. 10% of the population is under 6 years of age.

== Transport ==
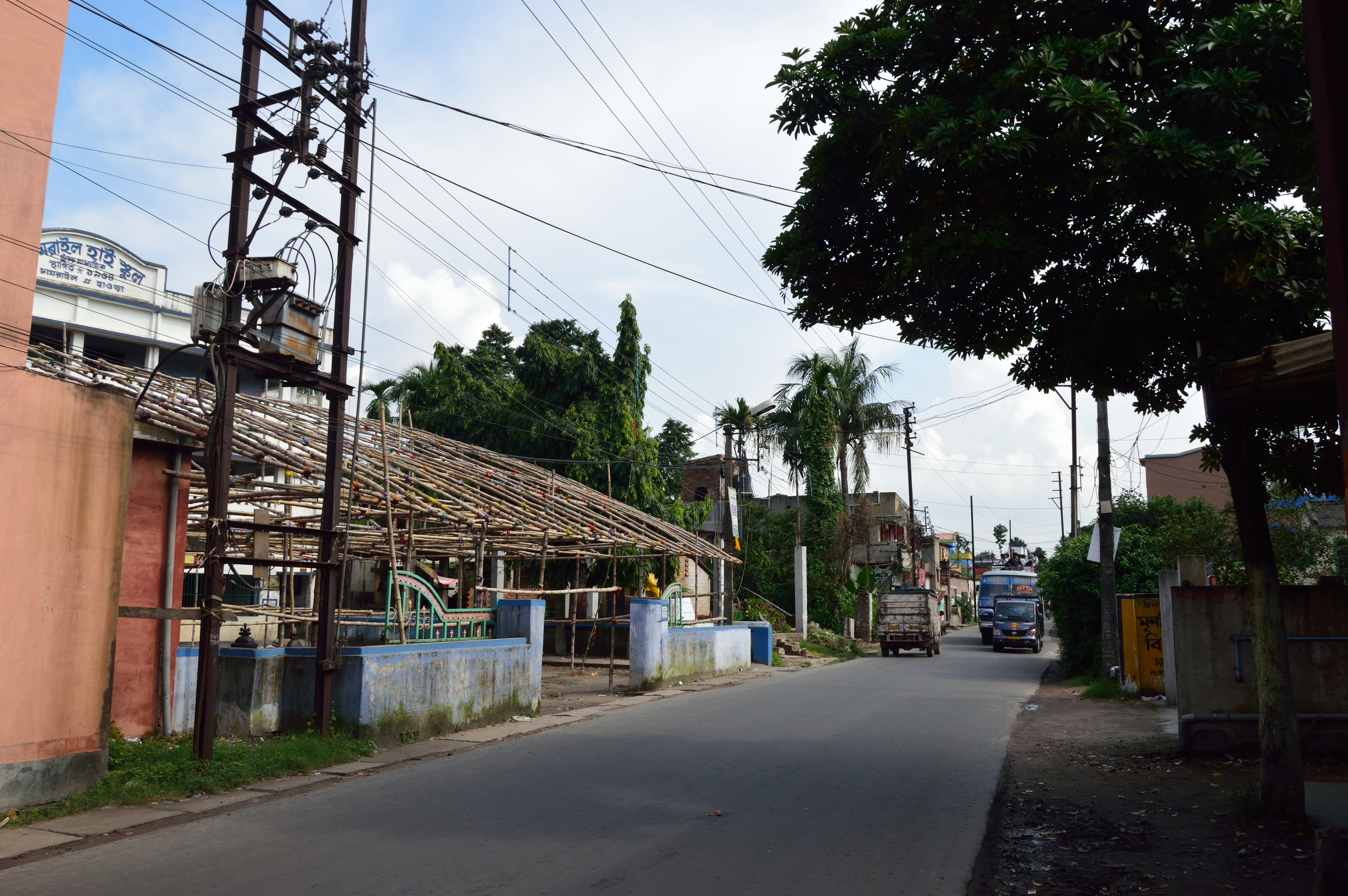
Benaras Road (part of SH 15), Chamrail

Benaras Road (part of State Highway 15) is the artery of the town.

=== Bus ===
==== Private Bus ====
- 57A Chanditala - Howrah Station

==== Mini Bus ====
- 30 Baluhati - Esplanade

=== Train ===
Kona railway station is the nearest railway station on Howrah-Amta line.
