= Champadanga =

- Village
- Location in West Bengal, India Champadanga (India)
- Coordinates: 22.83°N 87.96°E
- Country: India
- State: West Bengal
- District: Hooghly

Government
  - Body: Gram panchayat
- Elevation: 5 m (16 ft)

Population (2011)
  - Total: 12,518

Languages
  - Official: Bengali, English, Hindi
- Time zone: UTC+5:30 (IST)
- PIN: 712401
- Telephone code: 91 3212
- Vehicle registration: WB
- Website: wb.gov.in

Champadanga is a Town in Tarakeswar CD Block in Chandannagore subdivision of Hooghly district in the Indian state of West Bengal.

== Geography ==
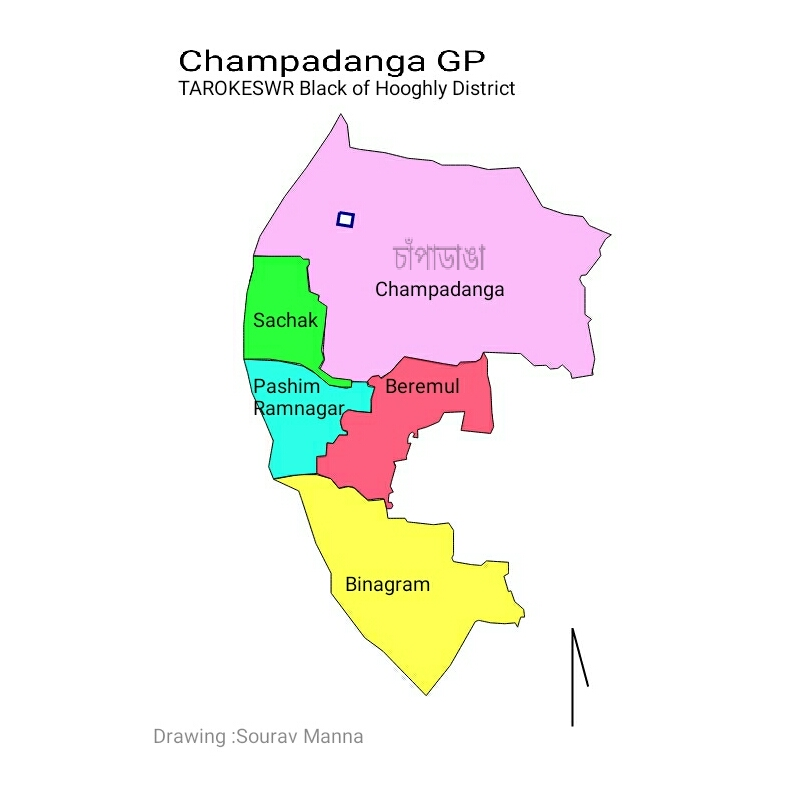

Champadanga is located at 22.83°N 87.96°E. The village situated on the bank of Damodar River.

== Demographics ==
As per 2011 Census of India Champadanga had a total population of 42,518 of which 21,685 (51%) were males and 20,833 (49%) females. Population below 6 years was 1,167. The total number of literates in Champadanga was 9,386 (82.69% of the population over 6 years).

== Economics ==
This is a rich agricultural area with several cold storages. Champadanga is widely known for its architectural buildings as well. Some of the prominent business figures of this area are Ram Dinesh Poddar, Sudhir Poddar and bros. and The Shaw Family. Their businesses are attached with Real Estate, Transport, Clothing, Spices and Oil.

== Education ==
There is a college named Rabindra Mahavidyalaya at Champadanga. Apart from that there is a public High School named, Champadanga High School, Bijay Krishna Uchcha Balika Vidyalay(Girls High School) along with a government primary school named, Middeypara Primary School.

This place is especially known for its art and culture.Here some special personalities are Pradip Pradhan (Artist), Biswanath Garai (Writer), Late Bijay Chakraborty (Artist), Late Gauranga Pal (Dramatist), Nitai Konar (Writer, Dramatist), Janajit Chakraborty (Writer, Artist).

== Transport ==
The Howrah-Amta line of Martin's Light Railways was opened up to Domjur in 1897, and to Amta in 1898. An extension from Bargachhia junction to Antpur was opened in 1904, and a further extension to Champadanga in 1908. The lines were in operation until their closure in 1971.

The new Howrah-Amta broad gauge line project, including the Bargachia-Champadanga branch line, was sanctioned in 1974–75. The first 24-km stretch of the section from Howrah to Bargachia was completed in 1984 by South Eastern Railway along with electrification, and commissioned soon after. The 6 km long Bargachhia-Munsirhat stretch was inaugurated in 2000. The Mahendralal Nagar-Amta section was finally opened in 2005. However, the Bargachhia-Champadanga branch line is yet to be completed. According to the reply to a parliamentary question in 2006, land to be provided free of cost by the State Government as per Memorandum of Understanding, was still to be handed over.
