= Eksara =

- Census Town
- Location in West Bengal, India Eksara (West Bengal) Eksara (India)
- Coordinates: 22.63°N 88.29°E
- Country: India
- State: West Bengal
- District: Howrah

Population (2011)
  - Total: 7,500

Languages
  - Official: Bengali, English
- Time zone: UTC+5:30 (IST)
- Vehicle registration: WB
- Lok Sabha constituency: Sreerampur
- Vidhan Sabha constituency: Domjur
- Website: howrah.gov.in

Eksara is a census town in Bally Jagachha CD Block of Howrah Sadar subdivision in Howrah district in the Indian state of West Bengal. Eksara is under the jurisdiction of Liluah Police Station of Howrah City Police.

== Geography ==
Eksara is located at 22.63°N 88.29°E between Kona and Chamrail.

== Demographics ==
As per 2011 Census of India Eksara had a total population of 7,500 of which 3,834 (51%) were males and 3,666 (49%) were females. Population below 6 years was 941. The total number of literates in Eksara was 5,197 (79.23% of the population over 6 years).

As of 2001 India census, Eksara had a population of 6,485. Males constitute 52% of the population and females 48%. Eksara has an average literacy rate of 66%, higher than the national average of 59.5%: male literacy is 68% and female literacy is 64%. In Eksara, 13% of the population is under 6 years of age.

== Transport ==
Benaras Road (part of State Highway 15) is the artery of the town.

=== Bus ===
==== Private Bus ====
- 57A Chanditala - Howrah Station

==== Mini Bus ====
- 30 Baluhati - Esplanade

=== Train ===
Kona railway station is the nearest railway station on Howrah-Amta line.
