= MJH =

MJH or mjh may refer to:

- Maju railway station (Indian Railways station code: MJH), a railway station in West Bengal, India
- Mbamba Bay language (ISO 639-3: mjh), the language spoken along the shores of Mbamba Bay of Lake Malawi, Tanzania
