= Jagadishpur =

- Census Town
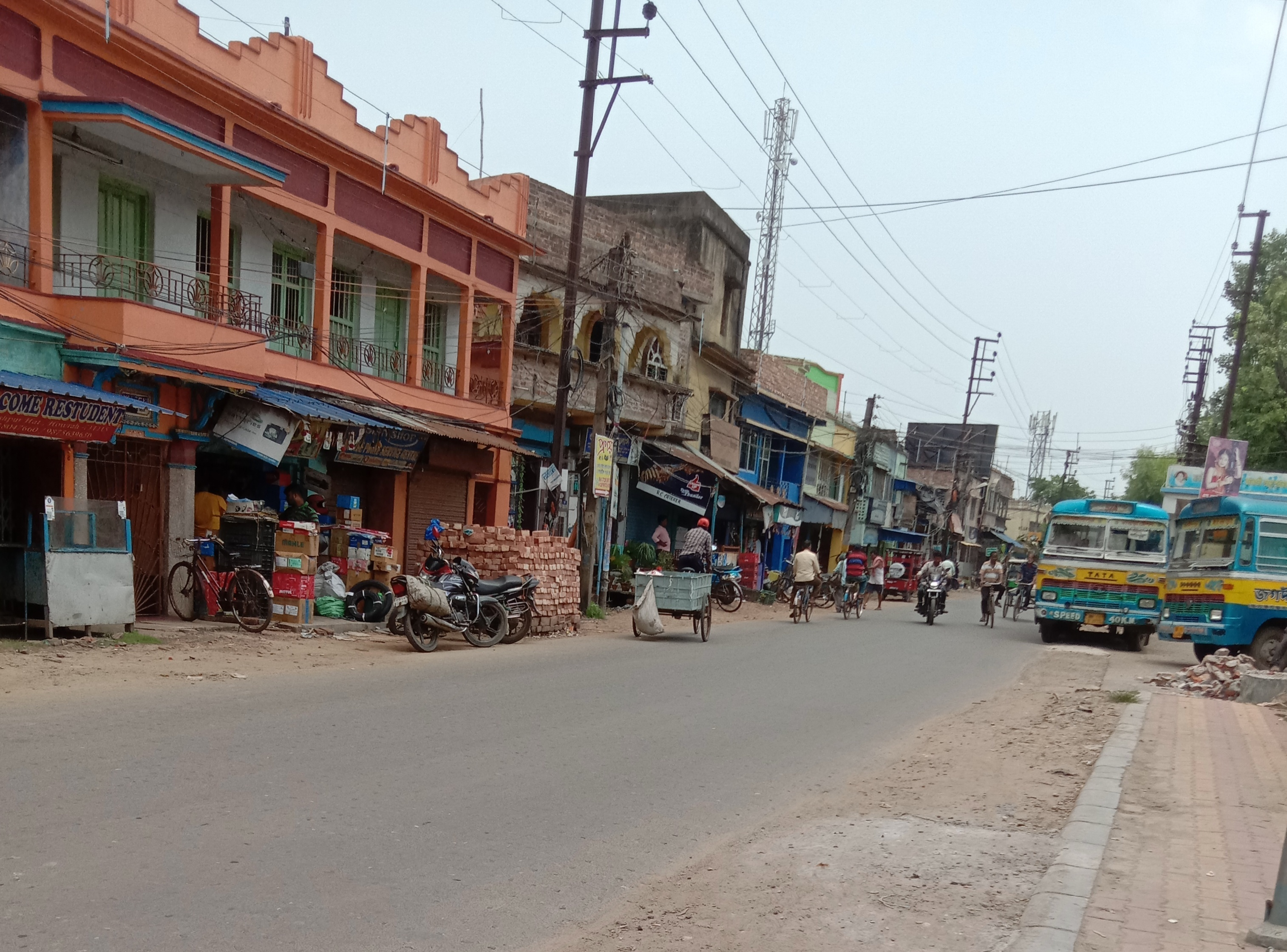
- A view of Jagadishpur Hat

- Location in West Bengal, India Jagadishpur (West Bengal) Jagadishpur (India)
- Coordinates: 22.65°N 88.29°E
- Country: India
- State: West Bengal
- District: Howrah

Population (2011)
  - Total: 25,360

Languages
  - Official: Bengali, English
- Time zone: UTC+5:30 (IST)
- Vehicle registration: WB
- Lok Sabha constituency: Sreerampur
- Vidhan Sabha constituency: Domjur
- Website: howrah.gov.in

Jagadishpur is a census town in Bally Jagachha CD Block of Howrah Sadar subdivision in Howrah district in the Indian state of West Bengal.

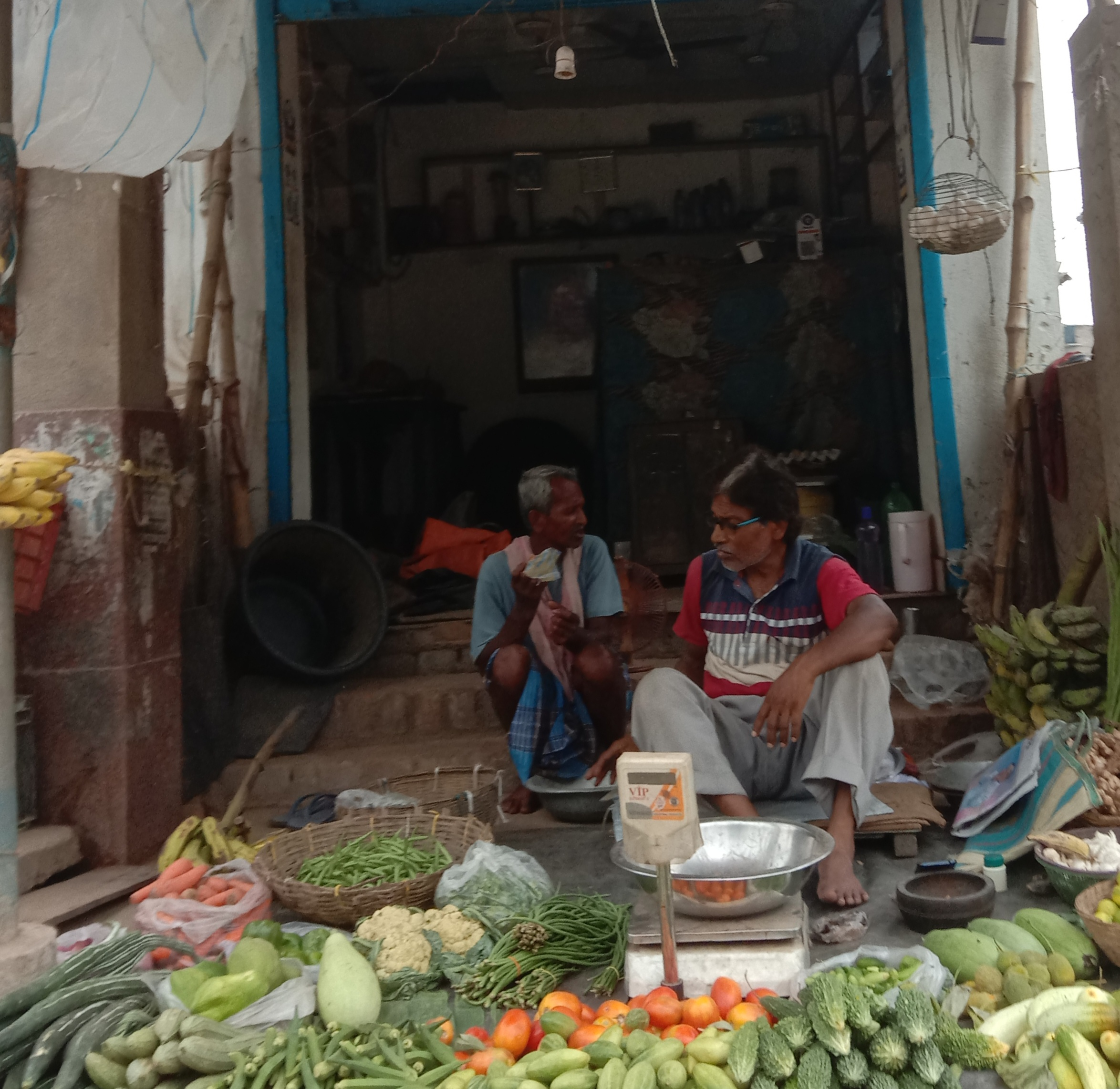
A vegetable shop in Jagadishpur Hat maket

Jagadishpur is under the jurisdiction of Liluah Police Station of Howrah City Police.

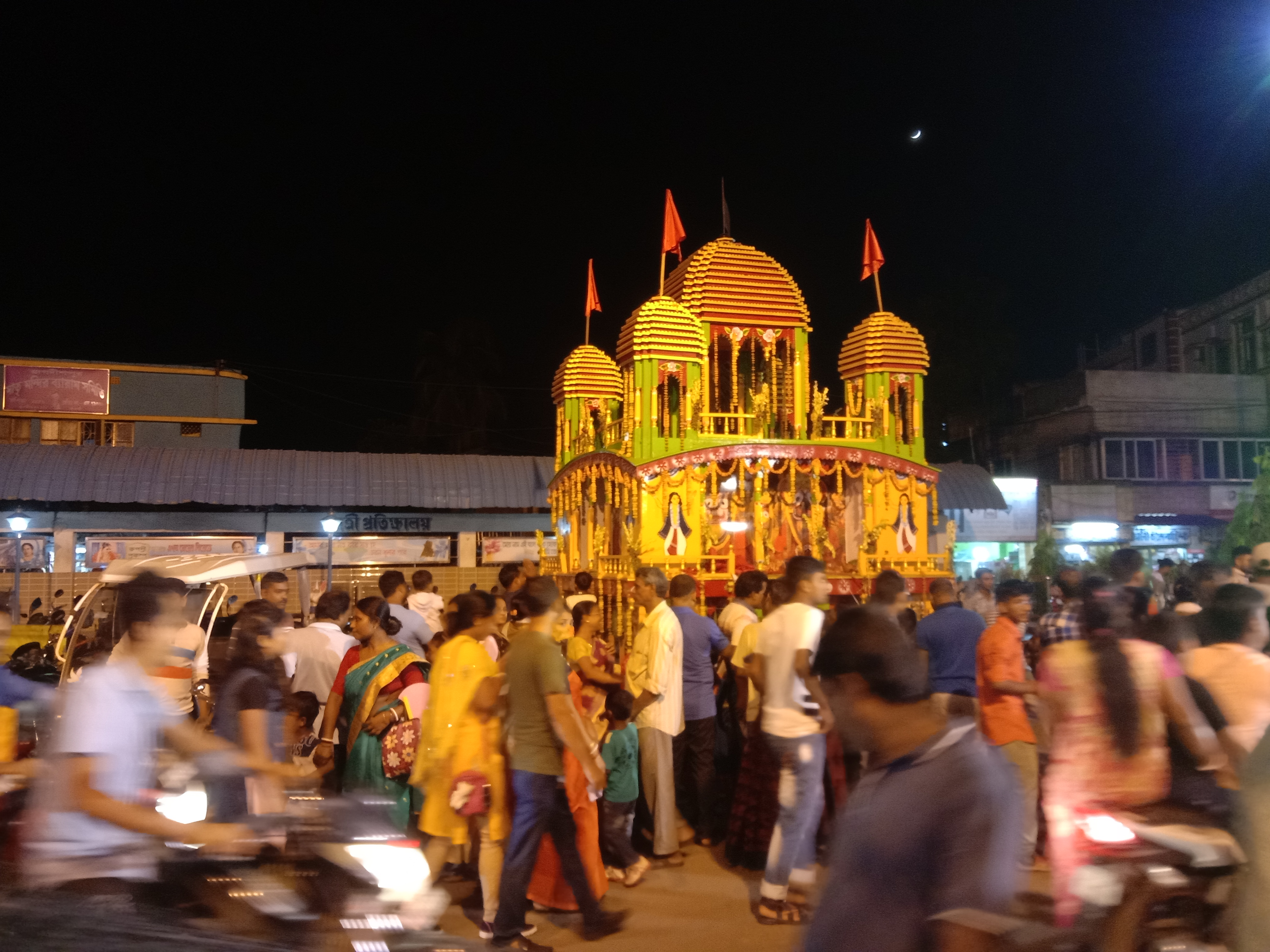
Chariot of Jagadishpur, during the ratha yatra (chariot festival) celebration in July 2022.

== Geography ==
Jagadishpur is located at 22.65°N 88.29°E.

== Demographics ==
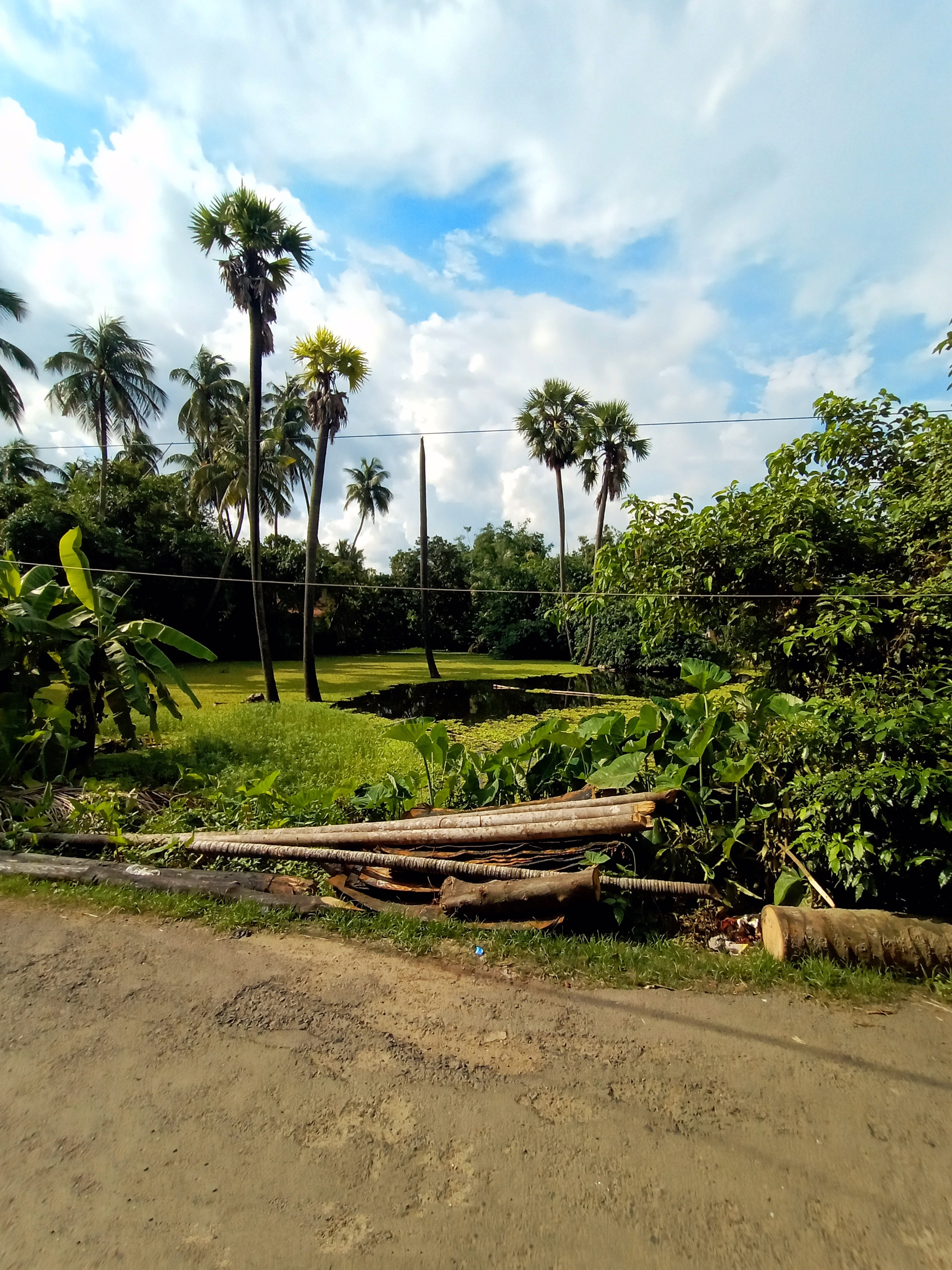
A natural view of Kalyalpara, Jagadishpur Hat, Howrah.

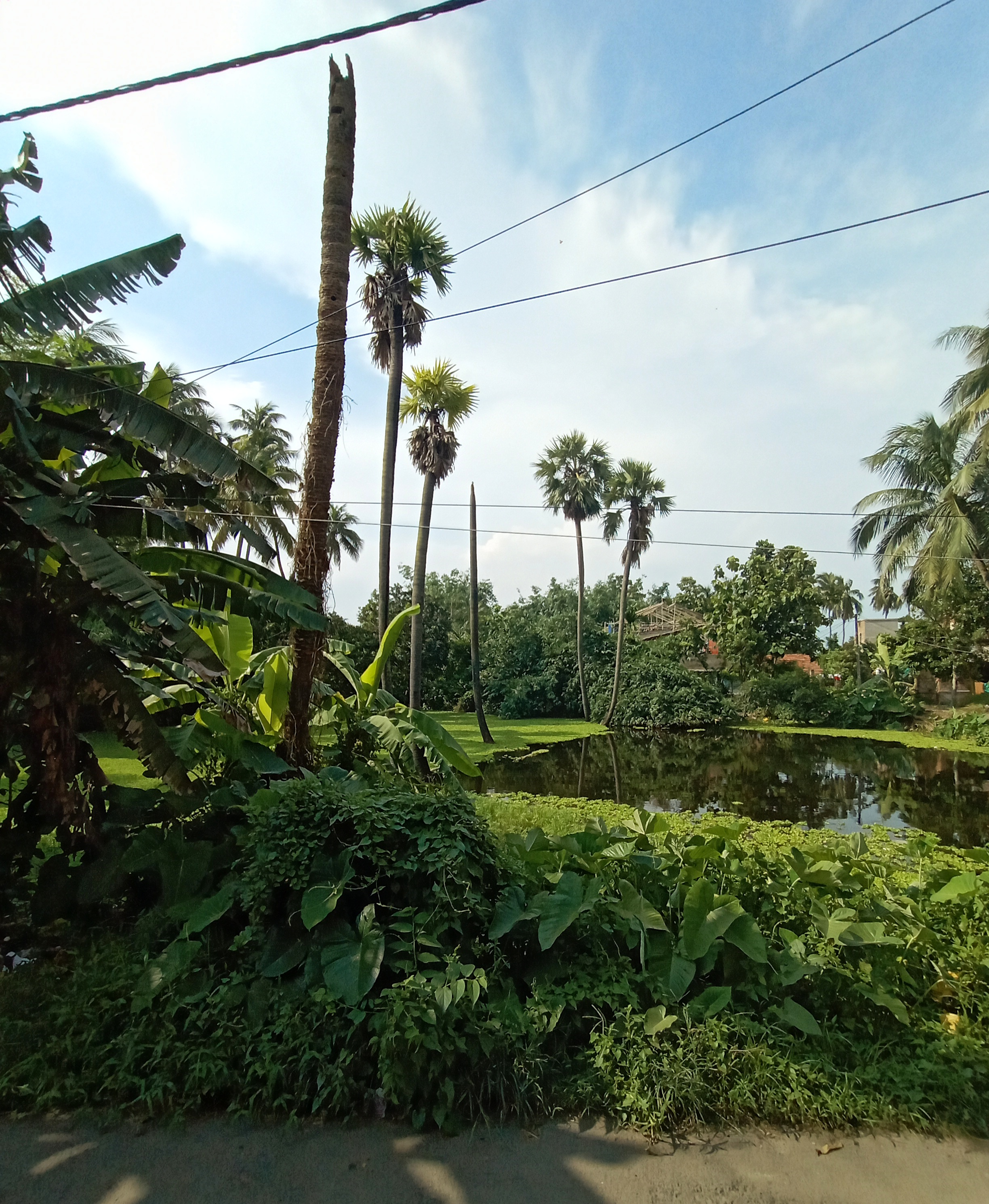
A natural view of Jagadishpur Hat

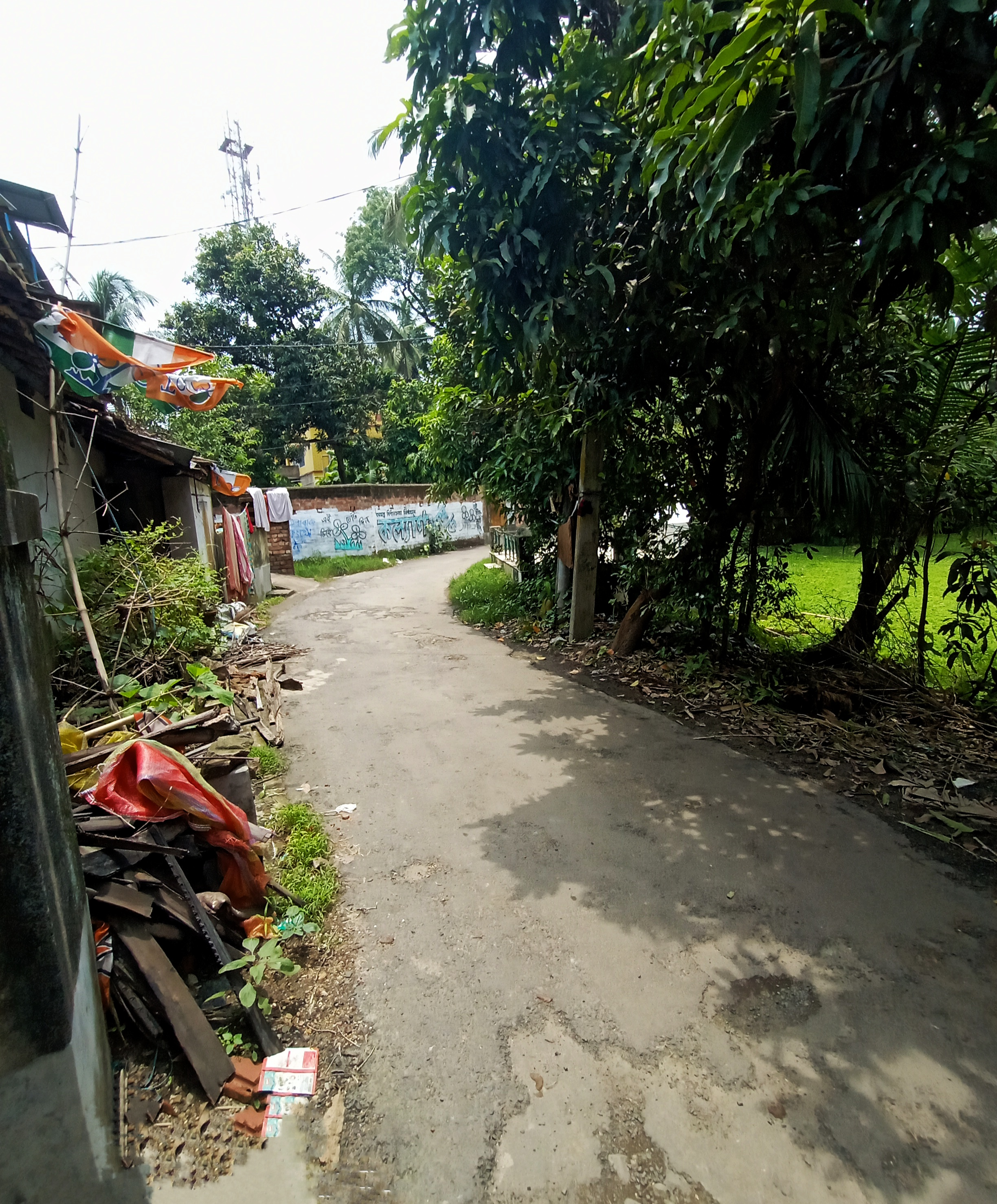
Local road in Jagadishpur

As per 2011 Census of India Jagadishpur had a total population of 16,259, of which 8,337 (51%) were males and 7,922 (49%) were females. Population below 6 years was 1,634. The total number of literates in Jagdishpur was 12,498 (85.46% of the population over 6 years).

== Transport ==
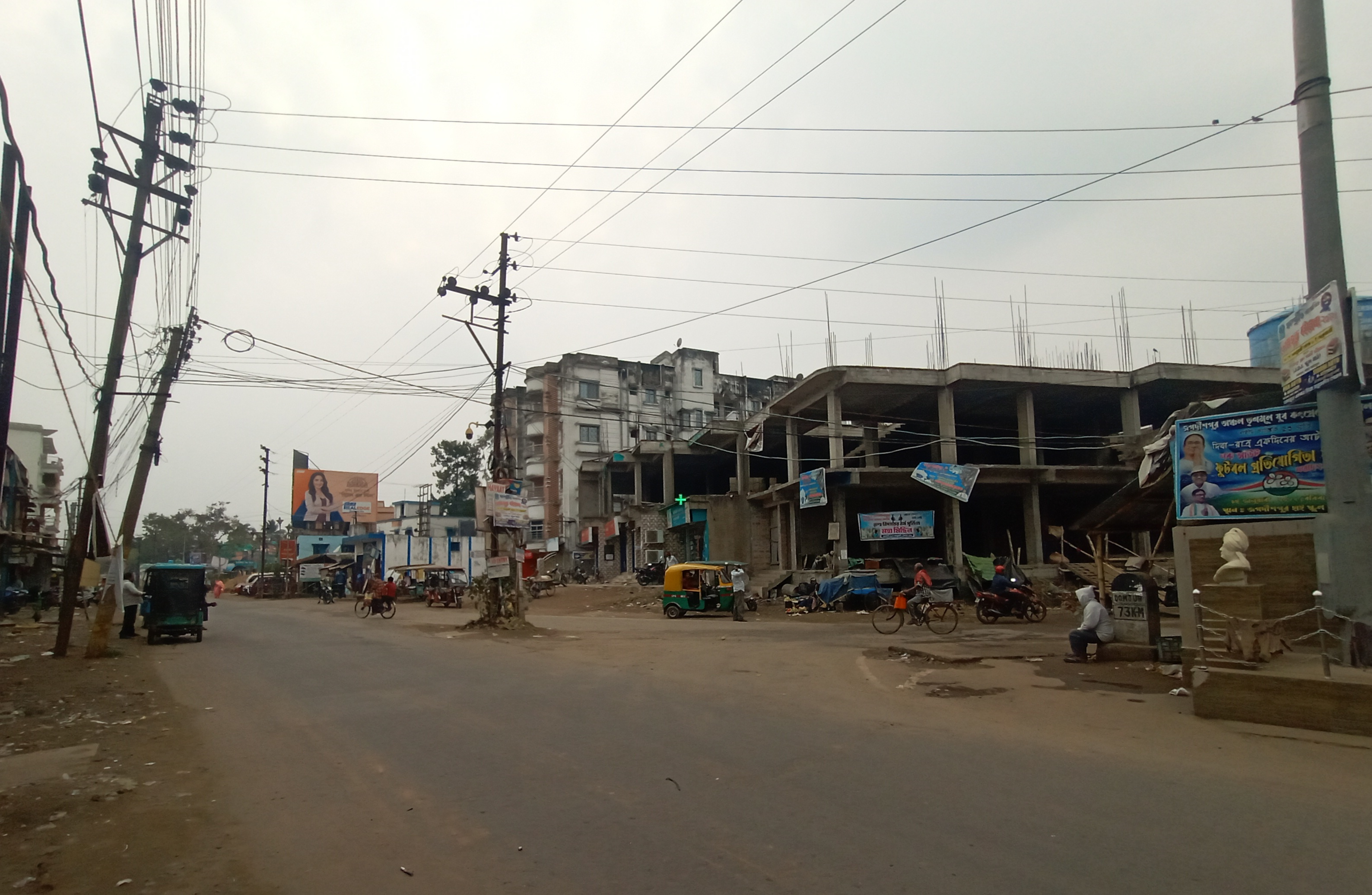
Jagadishpur Hat market on Benaras Road

Benaras Road (part of State Highway 15) now National Highway 514 (NH514) is the artery of the town. Besides Domjur-Jagadishpur Road connects the locality with Domjur.

=== Bus ===
==== Private Bus ====
- 57A (Chanditala — Howrah Station)

==== Mini Bus ====
- 30 (Baluhati — Esplanade)

=== Train ===
Jagadishpur had Railway station until 1972. It was in Howrah Seakhala Martin Railway Narrow Gauge Train route. Currently the Kona railway station is the nearest railway station on Howrah-Amta line. The nearest railway junction is Dankuni railway station on Howrah-Bardhaman chord line.
