= Rabindra Mahavidyalaya =

General degree college in Champadanga, India

- Type: Undergraduate college Public college
- Established: 1971; 55 years ago
- Affiliations: University of Burdwan
- Location: Champadanga, West Bengal, 712401, India; 22.8262666°N 87.9763376°E
- Campus: Urban
- Website: Rabindra Mahavidyalaya
- Location within West Bengal Location within India

Rabindra Mahavidyalaya, (popularly known as Champadanga College) established in 1971, is a general degree college in Champadanga, in the Hooghly district, India. It offers undergraduate courses in arts, commerce and sciences. It is affiliated to the University of Burdwan.

== History ==
The college named Rabindra Mahavidyalaya, officially started on and from 8 November 1971 after due affiliation of the University of Burdwan. Initially, only eight students were admitted to the pre-university course and twenty-five students to the B.Com Pass course. After that, in the academic session of 1972-1973, the B.A. course in the pre-university and degree level started. In the decade of the 1980s, a steady fund was allotted in the form of various aids. Gradually, the aids were granted to this institution by the State government as well as the University Grants Commission (UGC).

== Departments ==
=== Science ===
- Chemistry
- Physics
- Botany
- Zoology
- Microbiology
- Statistics
- Mathematics

=== Arts and Commerce ===
- Bengali
- English
- Sanskrit
- History
- Geography
- Political Science
- Philosophy
- Education
- Economics
- Physical Education
- Defence Studies
- Commerce

== Accreditation ==
The college is recognized by the University Grants Commission (UGC). It was accredited by the National Assessment and Accreditation Council (NAAC), and awarded B++ grade, an accreditation that has since then expired.

== See also ==
- List of institutions of higher education in West Bengal
- Education in India
- Education in West Bengal
