= Munsirhat =

- Census Town
- Location in West Bengal, India
- Coordinates: 22.65°N 88.08°E
- Country: India
- State: West Bengal
- District: Howrah

Languages
  - Official: Bengali, English
- Time zone: UTC+5:30 (IST)
- PIN: 711410
- Telephone code: 91 3214
- ISO 3166 code: IN-WB
- Vehicle registration: WB-xx xxx
- Lok Sabha constituency: Serampore
- Vidhan Sabha constituency: Jagatballavpur
- Website: howrah.gov.in

Munsirhat is a village in Jagatballavpur CD block in the Howrah Sadar subdivision of the Howrah district in the Indian state of West Bengal.

== Geography ==
Munsirhat is located at 22.65°N 88.08°E.

== Transport ==
Amta Road (part of State Highway 15) passes through the town. Besides Munsirhat-Udaynarayanpur Road and Munsirhat-Maju Road also start from here.

=== Bus ===
==== Government bus ====
- C11/1 Munsirhat- Howrah
- E12 Udaynarayanpur- Esplanade

==== Public Bus ====
- E44 Rampur - Howrah Station

==== Mini Bus ====
- 34 Purash - Howrah Station

==== Bus Route Without Number ====
- Pancharul - Howrah Station
- Garbhawanipur- Rubi Hospital

=== Train ===
Munsirhat railway station is a station on the Howrah–Amta line of the Kolkata Suburban Railway system. Besides Munsirhat railway station, Mahendralalnagar railway station, which is about 1 kilometre (0.62 mi) away from the main town, between the villages of Dhasa and Ballavbati, also serves the locality. Munsirhat is 30 km from Howrah Station.

== Economics ==
Munsirhat is one of the markets of the district. There are several banks operating in the area including State Bank of India (SBI), Bank of India (BOI), UCO Bank, Bandhan Bank and Indian Bank.

== Culture ==
Sekrahati or Shankarhati village is adjacent to the Munsirhat bus stop. There is a century old atchala (eight-tier) Hindu temple and Ras Mancha in Ghoshpara in Sekrahati.

Every year, Munsirhat celebrates Ratha Yatra festival. And Munsirhat Celebrates Every year Fateali Mela.

== Education ==
Munshirhat Brahmanpara Chintamoni Institution (Est. in 1923) is the only higher secondary school. There are a number of government aided free primary schools.
