= Santragachi–Amta branch line =

Railway route in India

Overview
- Status: Operational
- Owner: Indian Railways
- Locale: West Bengal
- Termini: Santragachi (SRC); Amta (AMZ)

Service
- Services: Kolkata Suburban Railway
- Operator(s): South Eastern Railway zone

Technical
- Electrification: 25 kV AC (1967–69)
- Operating speed: 60 kilometres per hour (37 mph)

This line is a part of South Eastern Railway zone, on which the Kolkata Suburban local train runs from Howrah to Amta. Its total distance is about 35 km, which takes about one hour from Santragachi to Amta.

== History ==
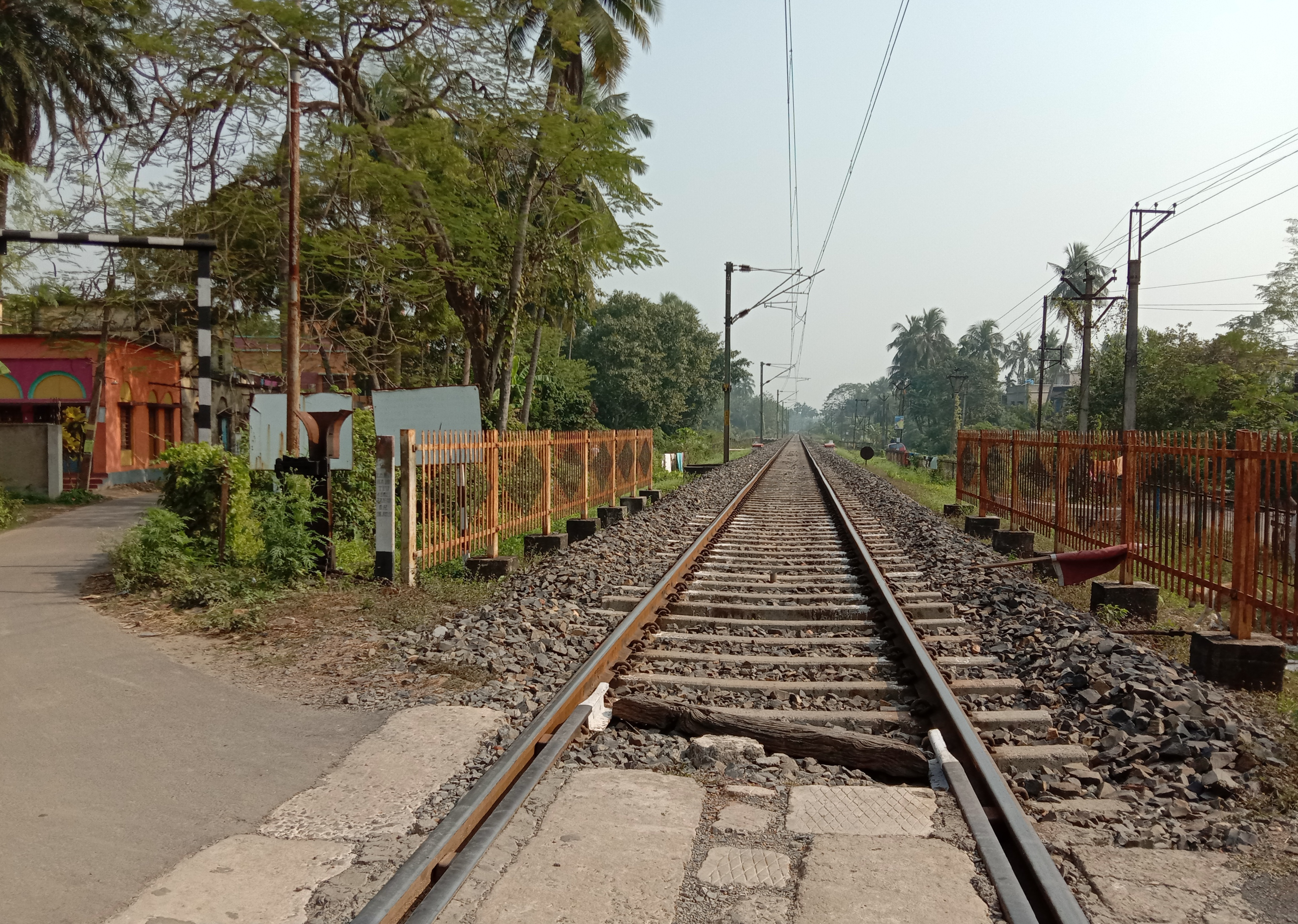
Level crossing of Santragachi–Amta branch line in Domjur.

The Howrah Amta Light Railway was owned and worked by the Howrah–Amta Light Railway Company (agents: TA Martin & Co, Calcutta). The Howrah–Amta Light Railway was closed on 1 January 1971. The track bed was used for South Eastern Railway's Amta branch.

- Howrah–Amta line (Narrow (2 ft) gauge: 28 miles)
- Howrah to Dumjur (9 miles) opened 1 July 1897
- Dumjur to Bargachia (7 miles) opened 2 October 1897
- Bargachia to Maju (6 miles) opened 4 May 1898
- Maju to Amta (7 miles) opened 1 June 1898–closed 1 January 1971
- Amta branch (Broad gauge: 28 miles)
- Santragachi Junction to Domjur (12 miles) opened 22 April 1984
- Domjur to Bargachia (5 miles) opened c. 1985
- Bargachia to Mahendra Lalnagar (3 miles) opened 22 July 2002
- Mahendra Lalnagar to Amta (8 miles) opened December 2004

== Construction ==
The union railway minister, Ms. Mamata Banerjee, formally inaugurated the 6 km-long Bargachia–Munshirhat broad-gauge line section in the South Eastern Railway system.

This section, mainly to benefit the daily commuters, is a part of the much-awaited 73.5 km-long Howrah–Amta new BG line, including the Bargachia–Champadanga branch line. The entire stretch is expected to be completed by the end of 2001 or early 2002. The new line project is estimated to cost Rs. 124 crores.

The minister announced a trial run for seven days, mainly on account of safety and security, and declared that two pairs of trains would be pressed into service between Howrah and Munshirhat (Mahendralal Nagar) from 29 July. Currently, six pairs of EMU locals run between Howrah and Bargachia every day.

Unveiling the plaque signalling the formal commissioning of the Bargachia–Munshirhat BG section at the Mahendra Lal Nagar terminal station, the Minister complimented SER and its workforce for having completed the project four months ahead of schedule.

The Howrah–Amta new BG line project including the branch line was sanctioned way back in 1974–75 at an initial cost of Rs. 32 crores. The first 24-km stretch of the section from Howrah to Bargachia was completed in 1984 by SER along with electrification, and commissioned soon after.

Work on further construction beyond Bargachia was frozen by the Railway Board for more than a decade, and was revived in 1995–96, when the next block section (with two halts at Pantihal and Munshirhat) was sanctioned.

The original narrow-gauge line, connecting Howrah and Calcutta to Amta (built in 1897), was part of the Martin's Light Railway in British India. The NG line connecting Howrah to Amta, Champadanga and Seikhala, was terminated on the bank of the Damodar river on the north west side. After running for a number of years, the line was abandoned in 1971, as operations became unprofitable owing to various reasons.

== Route ==
Stations between Santragachi and Amta are Bankra Nayabaz–Baltikuri–Kona–Dansi–Jhalurberi–Makardaha–Domjur Road–Domjur–Dakshinbari–Bargachia–Pantihal–Munsirhat–Mahendralalnagar–Maju–Jalasi–Harshidadpur.
