= Amta railway station =

Railway station in West Bengal

Amta

General information
- Location: Amta–Ranihati Road, Guzarpur, Kalatala, Amta, Howrah district, West Bengal; India
- Coordinates: 22°34′29″N 88°01′08″E
- Elevation: 5 metres (16 ft)
- System: Kolkata Suburban Railway
- Owner: Indian Railways
- Operator: South Eastern Railway zone
- Line: Santragachi–Amta branch line
- Platforms: 2
- Tracks: 2

Construction
- Structure type: At grade

Other information
- Status: Functioning
- Station code: AMZ
- Zone(s): South Eastern Railway
- Division(s): Kharagpur

History
- Opened: 1897
- Closed: 1971
- Rebuilt: 2004
- Former names: Howrah–Amta Light Railway

Services
Preceding station	Kolkata Suburban Railway	Following station
Terminus	South Eastern Line Santragachi–Amta branch line	Harishdadpur towards Howrah Junction
Route map
- Source: Google Maps
Location
- Location within West Bengal Location within India

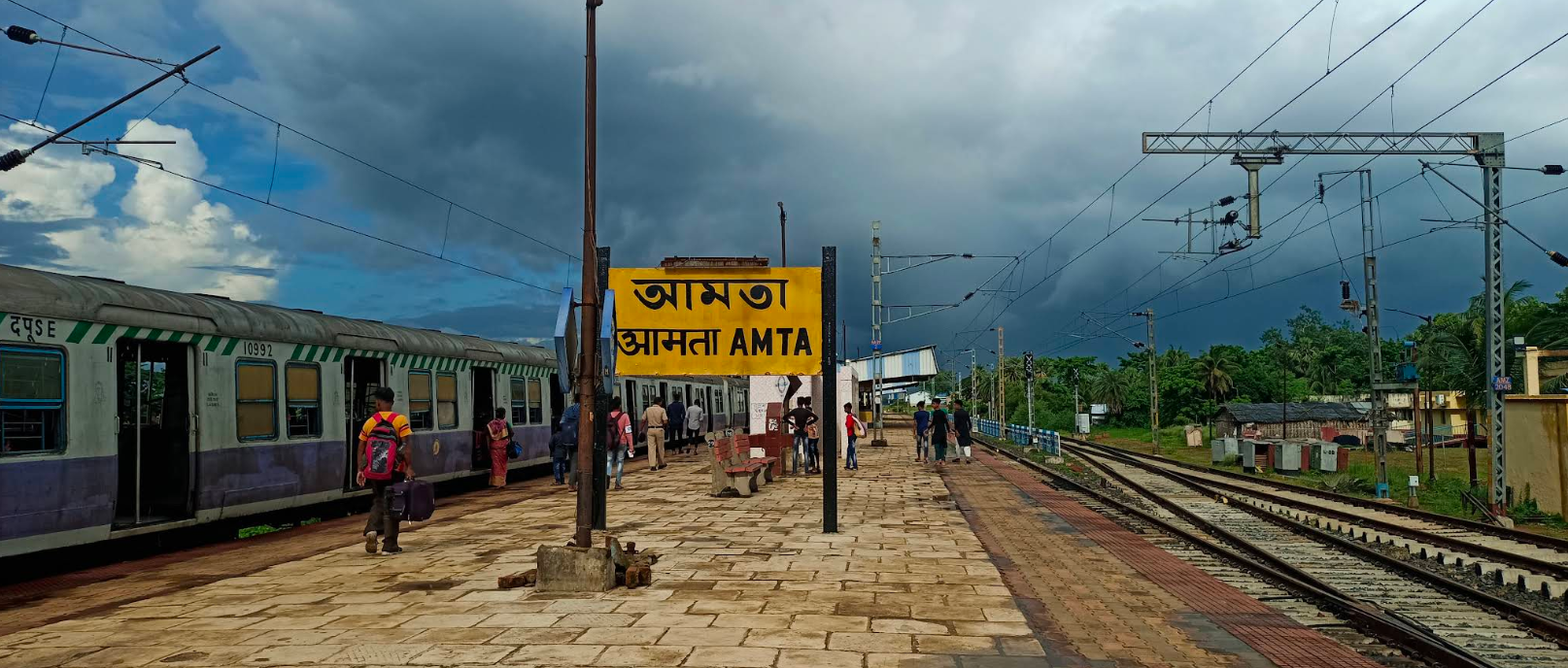
Amta Railway Station

Amta railway station is the terminal railway station on Santragachi–Amta branch line of South Eastern Railway section of the Kharagpur railway division. It is situated beside Amta - Ranihati Road, Kalatala more at Amta in Howrah district in the Indian state of West Bengal. It is the part of Kolkata suburban railway system.

== History ==
Howrah to Amta narrow-gauge track was built in 1897 in British India. This route was the part of the Martin's Light Railways which was closed in 1971. Howrah–Amta new broad-gauge line, including the Bargachia–Champadanga branch line was re constructed and opened in 2002–04.
