= Martin's Light Railways =

Narrow-gauge railroads in India

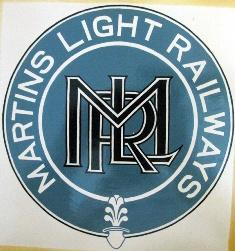

Overview
- Owner: Martin's Light Railways
- Locale: West Bengal, Bihar and Uttar Pradesh

Service
- Operator: Martin's Light Railways

History
- Opened: 1897
- Closed: 1987

Technical
- Line length: 388 mi (624 km)
- Track gauge: 2 ft 6 in (762 mm) and 2 ft (610 mm)

Martin's Light Railways (MLR) consisted of seven narrow-gauge railway lines in the states of West Bengal, Bihar and Uttar Pradesh in India. The railways were built and owned by Martin & Co., which was a British company. Later, it was being operated by Indian government and was permanently shut down in 1980's.

== Arrah–Sasaram light railway ==
The Arrah–Sasaram light railway connecting Arrah and Sasaram in Bihar in India was opened in 1914. The railway was built in 2 ft 6 in (762 mm) narrow gauge and total length was 102.2 kilometres (63.5 mi).

Due to increasing losses, the railway was closed in 1978. In 2006–07, the railway was converted to 1,676 mm (5 ft 6 in) and train services were resumed. The Broad gauge 1,676 mm (5 ft 6 in) railway line is 97.3 kilometres (60.5 mi) long

== Barasat–Basirhat light railway ==
The Barasat–Basirhat light railway connecting Barasat and Basirhat in West Bengal in India was opened in 1914. The railway was built in 2 ft 6 in (762 mm) narrow gauge and The line was later extended to Hasnabad increasing total length to 52 kilometres (32 mi). But due to increasing losses, the railway was closed in 1955. In 1962, the 53 kilometres (33 mi) long Barasat-Hasnabad section converted to Broad Gauge with a new alignment.1,676 mm (5 ft 6 in) and train services were resumed. The route is now part of the Kolkata Suburban railway. The old Shyambazar (Belgachia)-Beliaghata Bridge branch line was abandoned. An extension of 11 kilometres (6.8 mi) to Hingalganj was proposed in the Railway Budget of 2011.

== Bakhtiarpur–Bihar Sharif light railway ==
The Bakhtiarpur–Bihar light railway connecting Bakhtiarpur in Bihar and Bihar Sharif in state of Bihar in India was opened in 1902. The line was later extended to Rajgir. The railway was built in 2 ft 6 in (762 mm) narrow gauge and total length was 30 kilometres (19 mi). It was further extended 24 kilometres (15 mi) to Rajgir. In 1962, the railway was converted to Broad Gauge 1,676 mm (5 ft 6 in) and train services were resumed. New 135.95 kilometres (84.48 mi) long railway tracks from Bihar Sharif to Sheikhpura, Bihar Sharif to Daniyawan, Rajgir to Tillaiya & Islampur to Natesar have been made.

== Fatuha–Islampur light railway ==
The Fatuha–Islampur light railway connecting Fatuha and Islampur in Bihar was opened in 1922. The railway was built in 2 ft 6 in (762 mm) narrow gauge and total length was 43 kilometres (27 mi). The railway ran parallel to road for almost its entire route.

The line operated three 0-6-2T locomotives constructed by Manning Wardle of Leeds.

Due to increasing losses, the railway was closed in 1987. Later, the railway was converted to 1,676 mm (5 ft 6 in) Broad Gauge and train services were resumed. Futwah station is now called Fatuha. New 135.95 km (84.48 mi) long railway tracks from Bihar Sharif to Sheikhpura, Bihar Sharif to Daniyawan, Rajgir to Tillaiya & Islampur to Natesar have been made.

== Howrah–Amta light railway ==
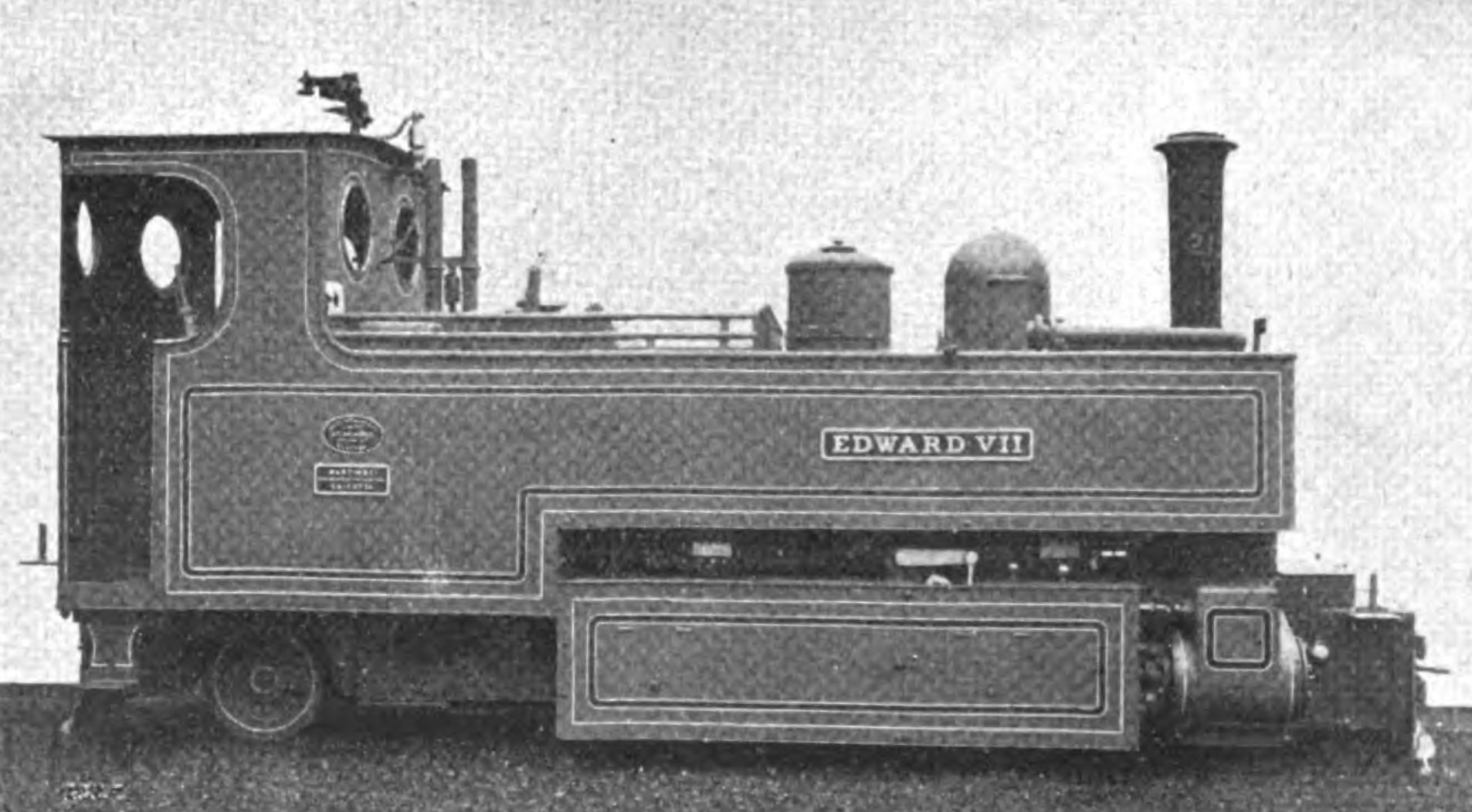
Sharp, Stewart (N° 4826 of 1902) 2 ft (610 mm) gauge locomotive built for Martin & Co. of Calcutta and used on the Howrah Amta Light Railway

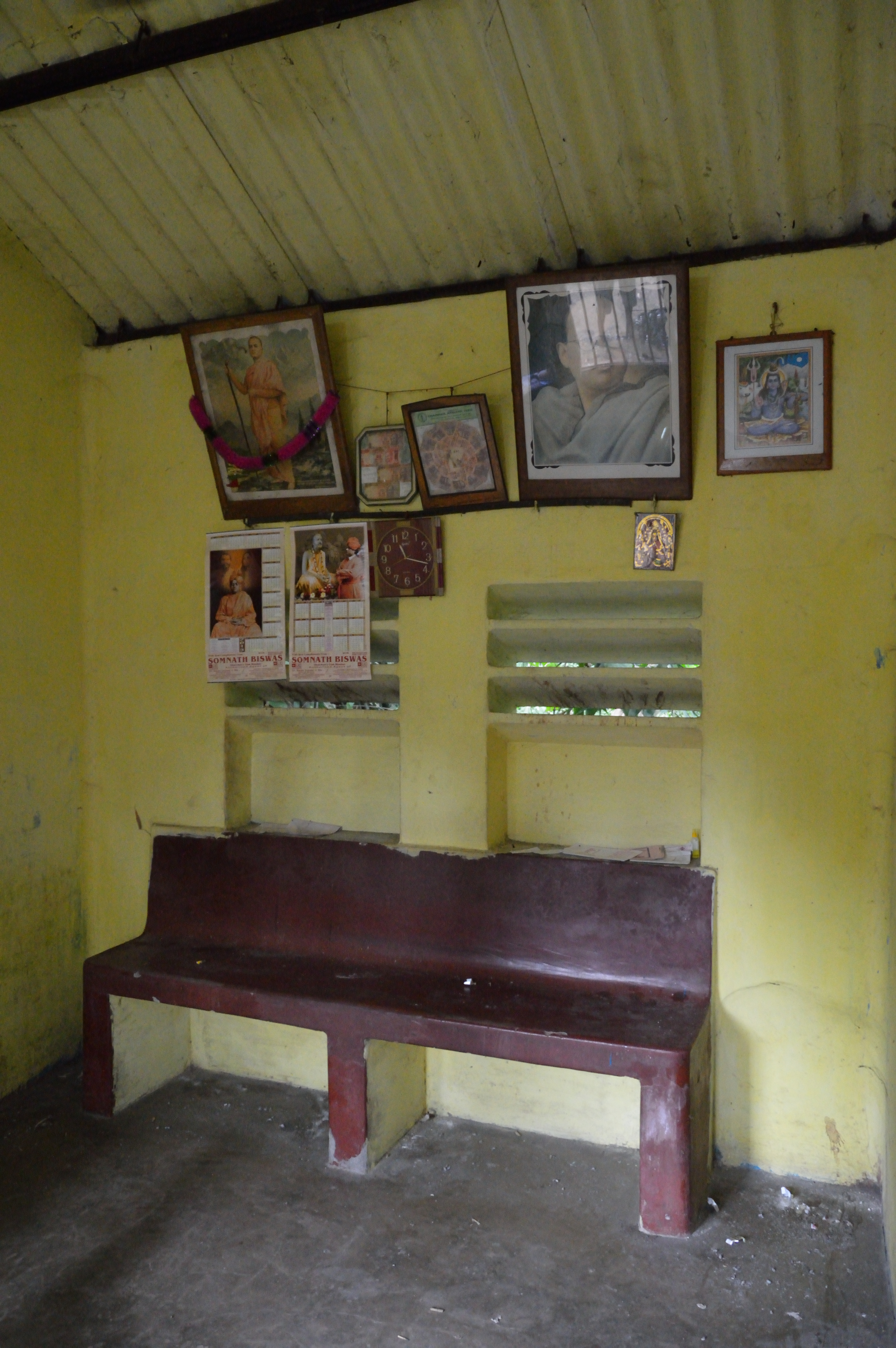
The waiting room of Chamrail station, now used by the Chamrail Athletic Club near Howrah, Sept. 2013

The Howrah–Amta light railway had its origin in an agreement, dated 12 June 1889 between the District Board of Howrah and Messrs. Walsh, Lovett & Co., which was subsequently renewed with Messrs. Martin & Co., and sanctioned by Government notification in the Calcutta Gazette of 27 March 1895. This was one of the Martin lines which was on 2'0" gauge instead of the more common 2'6".

The railway connecting Howrah and Amta in West Bengal was opened up to Domjur in 1897, and to Amta in 1900. An extension from Bargachhia (Bargachha) Junction to Antpur was opened in 1903, and a further extension to Champadanga in 1905. The total length of the railway was 79.7 kilometres (49.5 mi). Both the Howrah- Amta and Howrah-Seakhala lines used to start from Howrah NG (Telkal Ghat) Station (near Howrah Rail Museum) on the Hooghly river, running to Dasnagar station. Here they separate, the Howrah-Seakhala & Janai line running North-West along the Benaras Road to Seakhala & Janai in Hooghly district. The Howrah–Amta line runs west, chiefly along the side of the Jagatballavpur Road, and then goes south-west 49 kilometres (30 mi) to Amta, with a 30.7 kilometres (19.1 mi) long branch line to Champadanga from Bargachhia (Bargachha) Junction. At various times of the narrow gauge operations, the passenger trains started from different places. In the 1943 Indian Bradshaw they were shown as running from Kadamtala with Dasnagar as junction where line bifurcates towards Amta/Champadanga & Seakhala. Martin Rail Company planned to link Champadanga with Seakhala in 1945 but the 1946 Calcutta Riots put a stop to the plan. Now West Bengal State Highway 15 (Rani Ahilyabai Holkar Road) runs in place of old Narrow Gauge line connecting Champadanga with Seakhala.

The management decided to close the line from 1 January 1971 and in view of the growing demand of local people for a railway service, the Indian Railways agreed to construct a broad-gauge-way from Howrah to Amta & Champadanga.

The railway was converted to 1,676 mm (5 ft 6 in) Broad Gauge in phase starting from 1984 and completing in 2000 with a slightly different alignment. Only the Howrah–Amta 49 kilometres (30 mi) long section was rebuilt, while the 30.7 kilometres (19.1 mi) long branch line from Bargachhia Junction to Champadanga with 8.8 kilometres (5.5 mi) extension to Tarakeswar is under planning since 2001. Work in 39.5 kilometres (24.5 mi) long line from Bargachhia (Bargachha) Junction to Tarakeswar via Antpur & Champadanga is delayed.

There was some construction of a new alignment from Howrah station which utilized the existing route up to Santragachhi Junction and skipped some of the older stations up to Makardaha, while new stations came up on this alignment at Bankra Nayabaz, Baltikuri Junction, Kona, Dansi and Jhaluarber. While some stations from the old line have been retained, some stations on the rebuilt line are at new locations. But the new BG alignment measures the exact 49 kilometres (30 mi) as the old NG alignment. This route is now part of Kolkata Suburban Railway. It has been electrified and EMU local trains run between Howrah and Amta. This route now comes under the jurisdiction of the South Eastern Railway.

== Howrah–Seakhala light railway ==
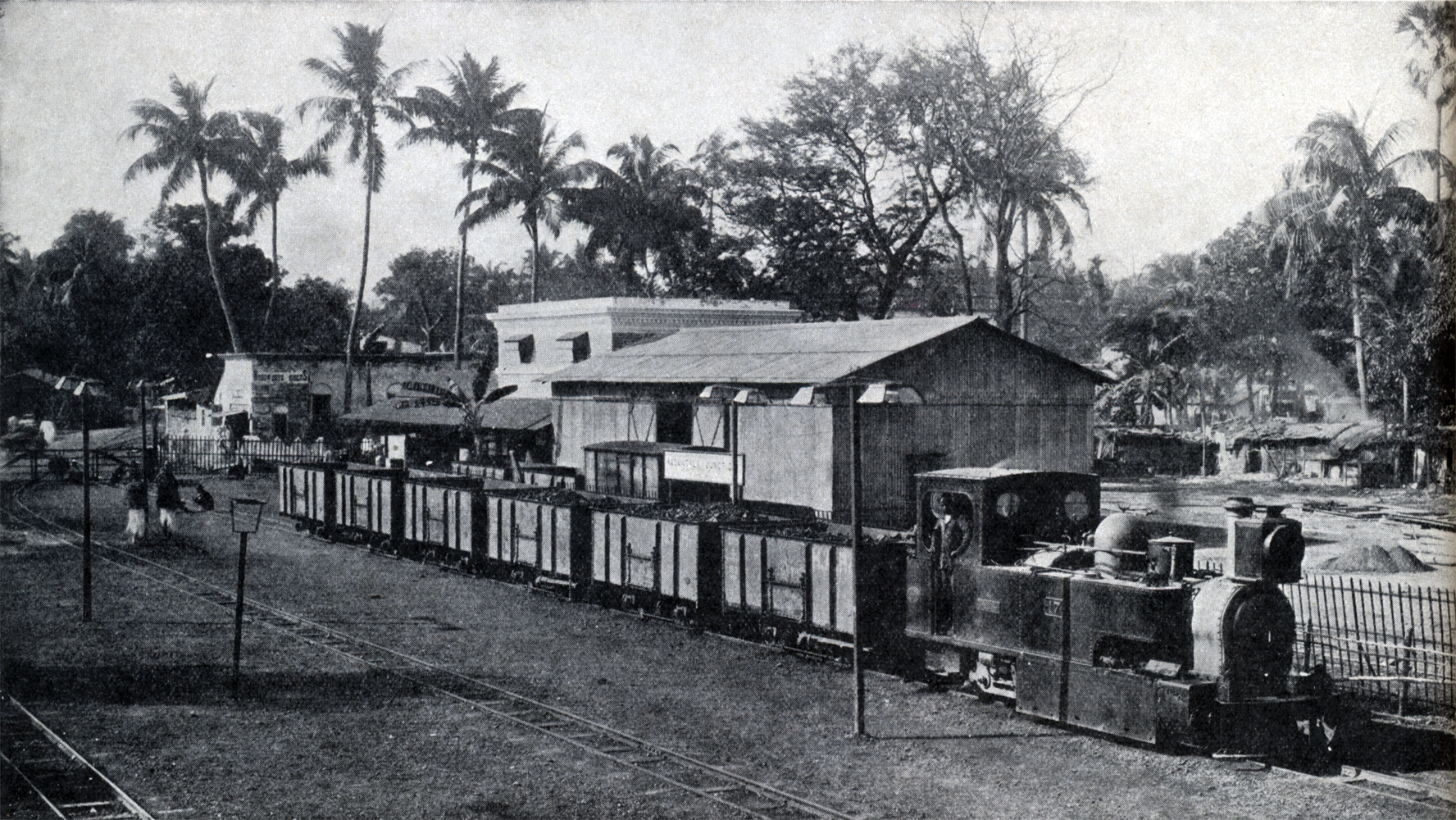
Howrah-Sheakhala Light Railway, 2 ft gauge 0-4-2T Hunslet locomotive No 17 'Eva' built in 1908

The Howrah–Sheakhala light railway had its origin in an agreement, dated 12 June 1889 between the District Board of Howrah and Messrs. Walsh, Lovett & Co., which was subsequently renewed with Messrs. Martin & Co., and sanctioned by Government notification in the Calcutta Gazette of 27 March 1895.

Like the Howrah–Amta light railway, this was of 2'0" gauge. The railway connecting Howrah and Seakhala in West Bengal was opened in November 1897 and the 16.5 kilometres (10.3 mi) long Chanditala-Janai Branch Line was opened in 1898. The total length of the railway was 53 kilometres (33 mi). Both the 49 kilometres (30 mi) long Howrah- Amta and the 36.5 kilometres (22.7 mi) long Howrah-Seakhala lines started from Howrah NG (Telkal Ghat) Station (near Howrah rail Museum) on the Hooghly river, running to Dasnagar station. Here they separate, the Howrah-Seakhala line running north-west along the Benaras road to Seakhala in Hooghly district. The Howrah–Amta line runs west, chiefly along the side of the Jagatballabhpur road, and then goes south-west to Amta. In the 1943 Indian Bradshaw they were shown as running from Kadamtala with Dasnagar as junction where line bifurcates towards Amta/Champadanga & Seakhala. Martin Rail Company planned to link Champadanga with Seakhala in 1945 but the 1946 Calcutta Riots put a stop to the plan. Now West Bengal State Highway 15 (Rani Ahilyabai Holkar Road) runs in place of old Narrow Gauge line connecting Champadanga with Seakhala.

While the 49 kilometres (30 mi) Howrah–Amta section was reopened as Broad Gauge in 2000, the Howrah-Seakhala light railway was permanently closed. The Old alignment of Howrah-Seakhala light railway is made into a State Highway. In 2009, the then Railway minister proposed restoration of Howrah Seakhala NG line in Broad Gauge from Dankuni Junction to Seakhala via Chanditala, Janai, Mosat & Furfura Sharif, covering 32.6 kilometres (20.3 mi) stretch. But this project is facing land problem, political interference & resistance from Furfura Sharif.

== Shahdara–Saharanpur light railway ==
The Shahdara–Saharanpur light railway connecting Shahdara in Delhi and Saharanpur in Uttar Pradesh was opened to traffic in 1907. The railway was built in 2 ft 6 in (762 mm) narrow gauge and total length was 94.24 miles (151.66 km).

Due to increasing losses, the railway was closed in 1970. It was later converted to 1,676 mm (5 ft 6 in) broad gauge by Indira Gandhi's Government on the strong recommendation of then Congress Member of Parliament Ram Chandra Vikal from Baghpat Lok Sabha. After gauge conversion it was reopened in the late 1970s. Although the broad gauge largely follows the same trackbed and alignment as the erstwhile narrow gauge, there is a 10.6 miles (17.1 km) deviation near Saharanpur. The 104.84 miles (168.72 km) long broad gauge line takes off south towards Delhi from Tapri Junction on the main line, while the narrow gauge line did not touch Tapri at all. Tapri Junction is located 4.25 miles (6.84 km) from Saharanpur. Other than that, all the stations are the same as before.

== Classification ==
The Martin's Light Railways were labeled as Class III railways according to Indian Railway Classification System of 1926. Only the Shahdara–Saharanpur light railway was classified as Class II.
