= Kolaghat (disambiguation) =

Kolaghat can refer to:

- Kolaghat, a census town in the state of West Bengal, India.
- Kolaghat (community development block), a rural area administratively earmarked for planning and development, containing the Kolaghat census town.
- Kolaghat railway station
- Kolaghat Government Polytechnic
- Kolaghat Thermal Power Station
