= Amalhara =

- Census Town
- Location in West Bengal, India Amalhara (India)
- Coordinates: 22.4243°N 87.8933°E
- Country: India
- State: West Bengal
- District: Purba Medinipur

Area
  - Total: 4.52 km^{2} (1.75 sq mi)

Population (2011)
  - Total: 14,261
  - Density: 3,160/km^{2} (8,170/sq mi)

Languages
  - Official: Bengali, English
- Time zone: UTC+5:30 (IST)
- PIN: 721134 (Amalhara)
- Telephone/STD code: 03228
- Lok Sabha constituency: Tamluk
- Vidhan Sabha constituency: Panskura Purba
- Website: purbamedinipur.gov.in

Amalhara is a census town in Kolaghat CD block in Tamluk subdivision of Purba Medinipur district in the state of West Bengal, India.

== Geography ==
Cities and towns in Tamluk subdivision of Purba Medinipur district
M: municipal city/ town, CT: census town, R: rural/ urban centre, H: historical/ religious centre
Owing to space constraints in the small map, the actual locations in a larger map may vary slightly

=== Location ===
Amalhara is located at 22.4243°N 87.8933°E. It is on the right bank of the Rupnarayan River.

=== Urbanisation ===
94.08% of the population of Tamluk subdivision live in the rural areas. Only 5.92% of the population live in the urban areas, and that is the second lowest proportion of urban population amongst the four subdivisions in Purba Medinipur district, just above Egra subdivision.

Note: The map alongside presents some of the notable locations in the subdivision. All places marked in the map are linked in the larger full screen map.

== Demographics ==
As per 2011 Census of India Amalhara had a total population of 14,261 of which 7,444 (52%) were males and 6,817 (48%) were females. Population below 6 years was 1,614. The total number of literates in Amalhara was 10,659 (85.86% of the population over 6 years).

== Infrastructure ==
As per the District Census Handbook 2011, Amalhara covered an area of 4.52 km^{2}. It had the facility of both a railway station and bus route at Kolaghat 1 km away. Amongst the civic amenities it had 45 road lighting points and 2,900 domestic electric connections. Amongst the medical facilities it had a hospital 20 km away, a dispensary/ health centre 6 km away, a maternity home 20 km away and 6 medicine shops in the town. Amongst the educational facilities It had were 7 primary schools, 2 middle schools and 1 secondary school in the town. The nearest senior secondary school was at Kolaghat 2 km away and the nearest degree college at Bagnan 20 km away. Most of the recreational and cultural facilities were there at Kolaghat/ Mecheda 2–3 km away.

== Transport ==
Amalhara is on the Tamluk-Kolaghat Road.

== Education ==
Rabindra Bharati Mahavidyalaya was established at Kolaghat located nearby in 2010. It is affiliated with Vidyasagar University.
