= Purbba Gopalpur =

- Village
- Location in West Bengal, India Purbba Gopalpur (India)
- Coordinates: 22.4345°N 87.7472°E
- Country: India
- State: West Bengal
- District: Purba Medinipur

Population (2011)
  - Total: 1,110

Languages
  - Official: Bengali, English
- Time zone: UTC+5:30 (IST)
- PIN: 721139
- Telephone/STD code: 03228
- Lok Sabha constituency: Ghatal
- Vidhan Sabha constituency: Panskura Paschim
- Website: purbamedinipur.gov.in

Purbba Gopalpur is a village in the Panskua CD block in the Tamluk subdivision of the Purba Medinipur district in the state of West Bengal, India.

== Geography ==
Cities and towns in Tamluk subdivision of Purba Medinipur district
M: municipal city/ town, CT: census town, R: rural/ urban centre, H: historical/ religious centre
Owing to space constraints in the small map, the actual locations in a larger map may vary slightly

=== Location ===
Purbba Gopalpur is located at 22.4345°N 87.7472°E.

=== Urbanisation ===
94.08% of the population of Tamluk subdivision live in the rural areas. Only 5.92% of the population live in the urban areas, and that is the second lowest proportion of urban population amongst the four subdivisions in Purba Medinipur district, just above Egra subdivision.

Note: The map alongside presents some of the notable locations in the subdivision. All places marked in the map are linked in the larger full screen map.

== Demographics ==
According to the 2011 Census of India, Purbba Gopalpur had a total population of 1,110, of which 574 (52%) were males and 536 (49%) were females. There were 101 persons in the age range of 0–6 years. The total number of literate persons in Purbba Goplapur was 849 (89.14% of the population over 6 years).

== Purbba Gopalpur picture gallery ==
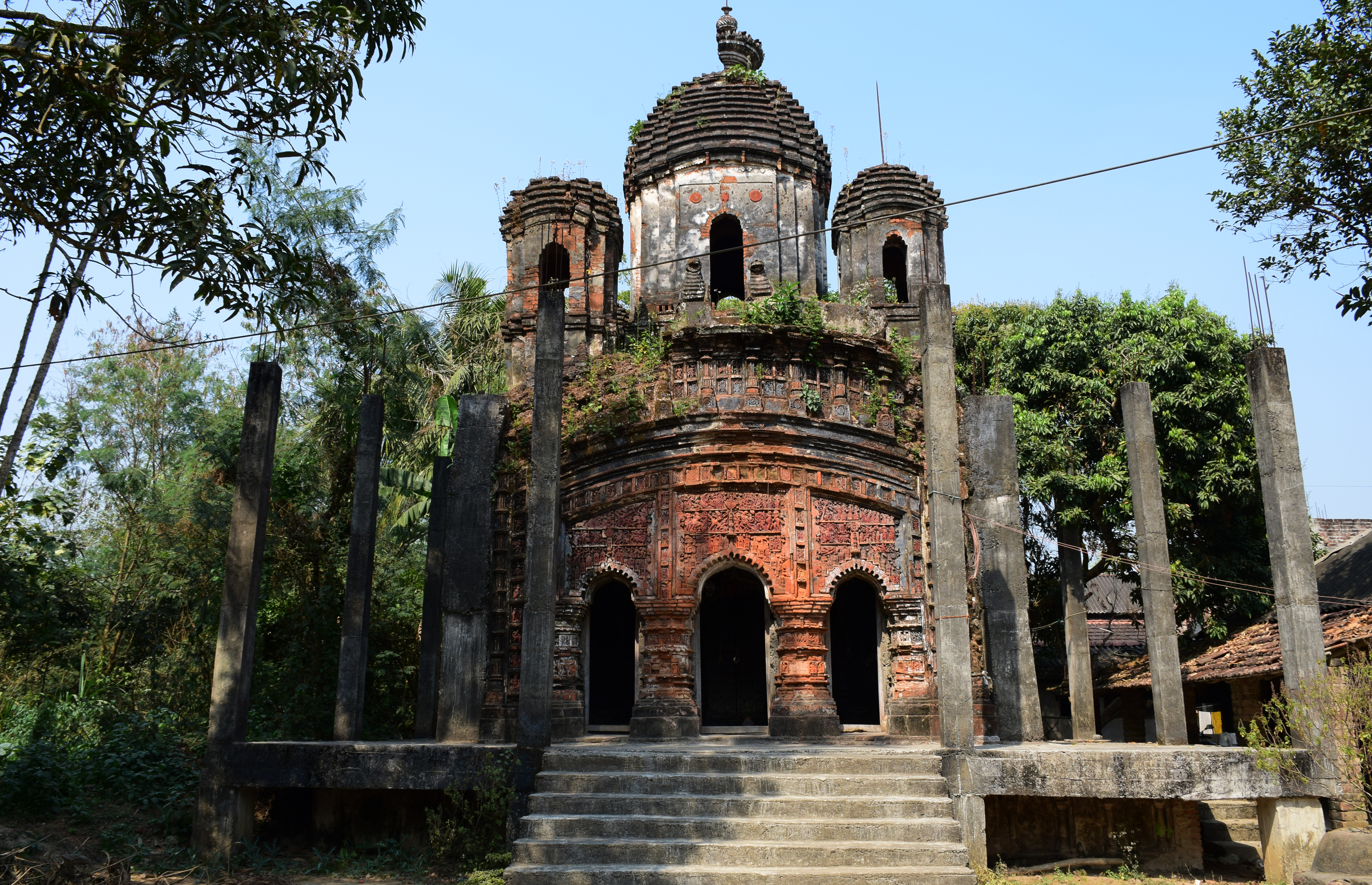
Pancharatna Radha Gobinda temple.

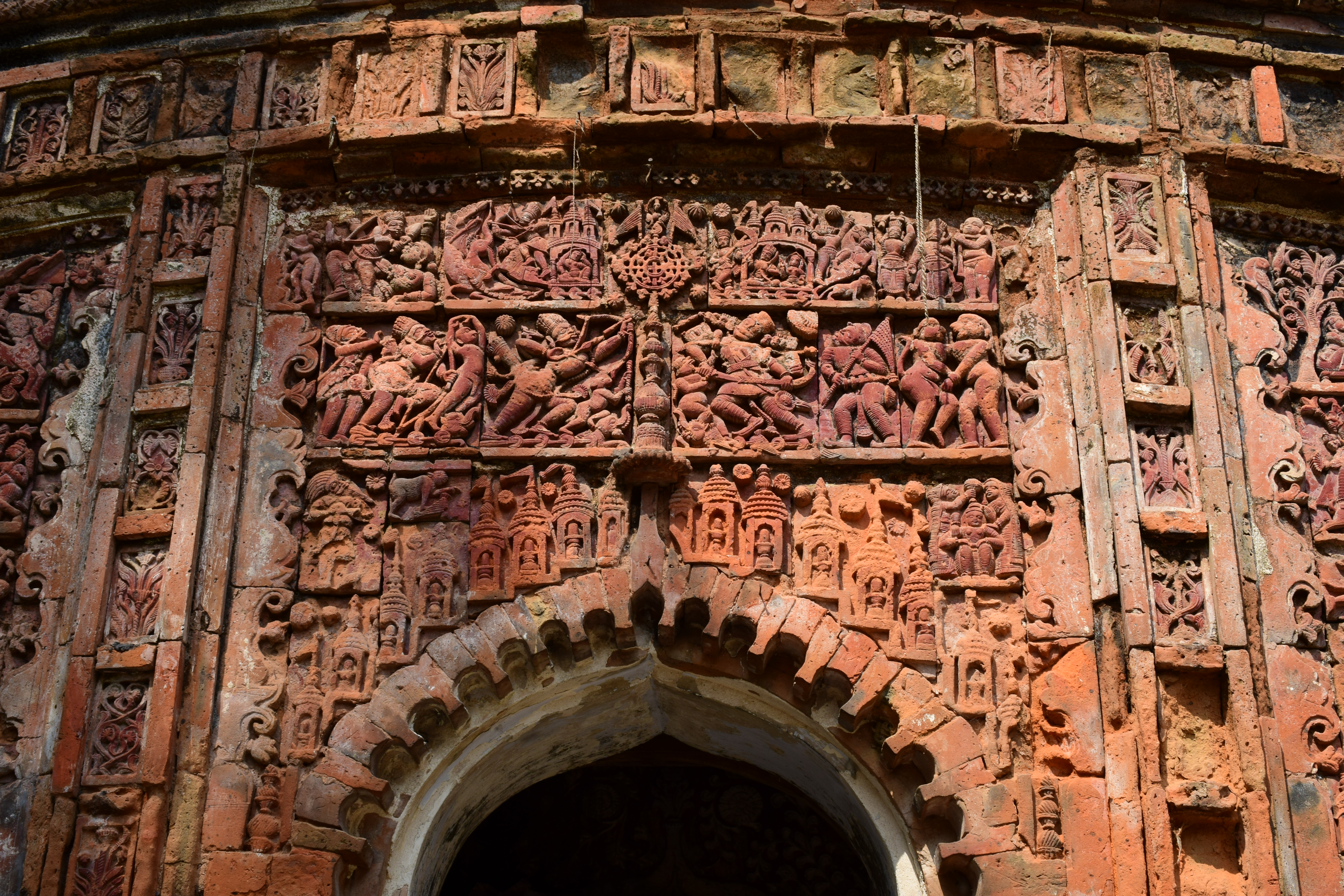
Terracotta decoration

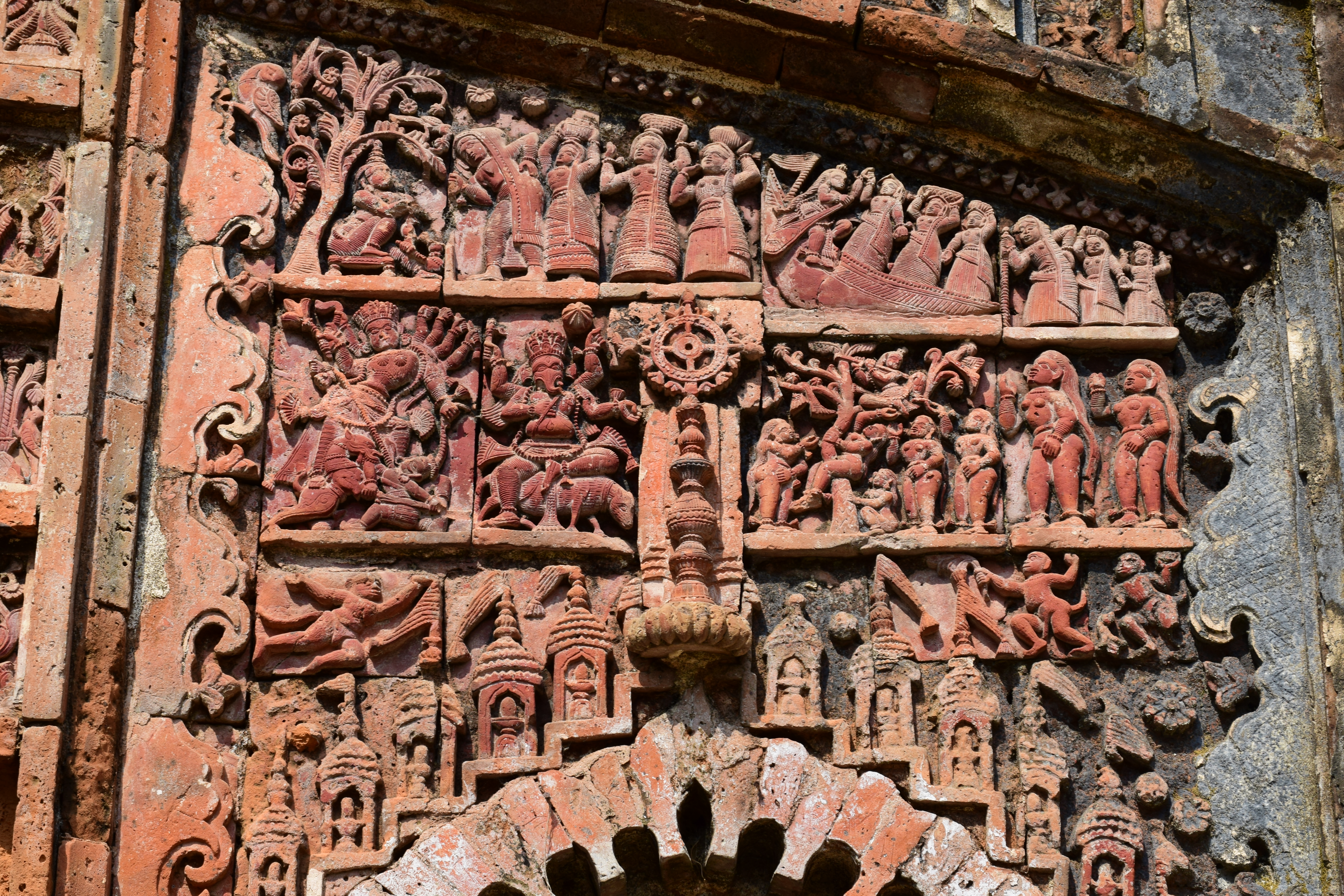
Terracotta decoration
