= Tamluk subdivision =

Tamluk Sadar subdivision
- Subdivision
- Interactive map of Tamluk Sadar subdivision
- Coordinates: 22.30°N 87.92°E
- Country: India
- State: West Bengal
- District: Purba Medinipur
- Headquarters: Tamluk

Area
  - Total: 1,084.30 km^{2} (418.65 sq mi)

Population (2011)
  - Total: 1,791,695
  - Density: 1,652.40/km^{2} (4,279.69/sq mi)

Languages
  - Official: Bengali, English
- Time zone: UTC+5:30 (IST)
- ISO 3166 code: IN-WB
- Vehicle registration: WB
- Website: purbamedinipur.gov.in

Tamluk Sadar subdivision is a subdivision of the Purba Medinipur district in the state of West Bengal, India. It under Burdwan division.

== Subdivisions ==
Purba Medinipur district is divided into the following administrative subdivisions:

Subdivision	Headquarters	Area km^{2}	Population (2011)	Rural population % (2001)	Urban population % (2001)
Tamluk Sadar	Tamluk	1084.30	1,791,695	94.08	5.92
Haldia	Haldia	683.94	959,934	79.19	20.81
Egra	Egra	940.96	958,939	96.96	3.04
Contai	Contai	1251.21	1,385,307	93.55	6.45
Purba Medinipur district	Tamluk	4,713.00	5,095,875	91.71	8.29

== Administrative units ==
Cities and towns in Tamluk subdivision of Purba Medinipur district
M: municipal city/ town, CT: census town, R: rural/ urban centre, H: historical/ religious centre
Owing to space constraints in the small map, the actual locations in a larger map may vary slightly

Tamluk subdivision has 6 police stations, 7 community development blocks, 7 panchayat samitis, 82 gram panchayats, 852 mouzas, 805 (+ 1 partly) inhabited villages, 2 municipalities and 11 census towns. The municipalities are: Tamluk and Panskura. The census towns are: Anantapur, Dakshin Baguan, Kakdihi, Shantipur, Kolaghat, Amalhara, Mihitikri, Kharisha, Goasafat, Kotbar and Erashal. The subdivision has its headquarters at Tamluk.

== Area ==
Tamluk subdivision has an area of 1084.30 km^{2}, population in 2011 of 1,791,695 and density of population of 1,652 per km^{2}. 35.16% of the population of the district resides in this subdivision.

== Police stations ==
Police stations in Tamluk subdivision have the following features and jurisdiction:

Police station	Area covered km^{2} *	Inter-state border	Municipal town	CD block
Tamluk	214.14	-	Tamluk	Tamluk, Sahid Matangini
Kolaghat	?	-	-	Sahid Matangini, Kolaghat
Panskura	285	-	Panskura	Panskura
Moyna	147	-	-	Moyna
Nandakumar	151.73	-	-	Nandakumar
Chandipur	138.86	-	-	Chandipur

*The data for area is as per the website of Purba Medinipur Police, but it appears that it has not been updated for a long time.

== Blocks ==
Community development blocks in Tamluk subdivision are:

CD Block	Headquarters	Area km^{2}	Population (2011)	SC %	ST %	Literacy rate %	Census towns
Tamluk	Tamluk	123.50	217,776	9.71	0.03	87.06	2
Sahid Matangini	Chatara	97.82	199,210	5.64	0.12	86.99	2
Panskura	Panskura	246.92	283,303	10.30	4.42	83.65	-
Kolaghat	Kolaghat	147.91	290,124	8.48	0.33	84.93	4
Moyna	Moyna	154.51	226,927	25.04	0.14	86.33	1
Nandakumar	Kumarpur	165.70	262,998	14.21	0.24	85.56	-
Chandipur	Chandipur	137.58	188,119	10.15	0.11	87.81	2

== Gram panchayats ==
The subdivision contains 82 gram panchayats under 7 community development blocks:

- Nandakumar block: Byabattarhat Paschim, Bargodagodar, Kalyanpur, Seoraberia Jalpai–I, Basudevpur, Kumarara, Seoraberia Jalpai–II, Byabattarhat Purba, Chakshimulia, Kumarchak, Shitalpur Paschim and Dakshin Narikelda.
- Moyna block: Bakcha, Mayna–I, Naichanpur–II, Srikantha, Mayna–II, Paramanandapur, Tilkhoja, Gozina, Naichanpir–I and Ramchak.
- Tamluk block: Anantapur–I, Bishnubarh–II, Padumpur–II, Sreerampur–I, Anantapur–II, Nilkunthia, Pipulberia–I, Sreerampur–II, Bishnubarh–I, Padumpur–I, Pipulberia–II, Uttar Sonamui.
- Sahid Matangini block: Balluk–I, Kakharda, Raghunathpur–I, Shantipur–II, Balluk–II[kakatiya bazar], Kharui–I, Raghunathpur–II, Dhalhara, Kharui–II and Shantipur–I.
- Panskura block: Chaitanyapur–I, Haur, Panskura–I, Radhaballavchak, Chaitanyapur–II, Keshapat, Pratappur–I, Raghunathbari, Ghoshpur, Khandakhola, Pratappur–II, Gobindanagar, Mysora and Purusottampur.
- Kolaghat block: Amalhanda, Deriachak, Kola–II, Sidhha–II, Baishnabchak, Gopalnagar, Pulshita, Bhogpur, Khanyadihi, Sagarbarh, Brindabanchak, Kola–I and Siddha–I.
- Chandipur block: Brajalalchak, Chaukhali, Jalpai, Osmanpur, Brindabanpur–I, Dibakarpur, Kulbari, Brindabanpur–II, Iswarpur and Nandapur Baraghuni.

== Education ==
With a literacy rate of 87.66% Purba Medinipur district ranked first amongst all districts of West Bengal in literacy as per the provisional figures of the census of India 2011. Within Purba Medinipur district, Tamluk subdivision had a literacy rate of 85.98%, Haldia subdivision 86.67%, Egra subdivision 86.18% and Contai subdivision 89.19%. All CD Blocks and municipalities in the district had literacy levels above 80%.

Given in the table below (data in numbers) is a comprehensive picture of the education scenario in Purba Medinipur district for the year 2013-14.

Subdivision	Primary school		Middle school		High school		Higher secondary school		General college, univ		Technical / professional instt		Non-formal education	
Subdivision	Institution	Student	Institution	Student	Institution	Student	Institution	Student	Institution	Student	Institution	Student	Institution	Student
Tamluk	1,084	84,258	78	5,789	77	43,408	144	171,516	6	12,728	17	2,747	2,704	112,411
Haldia	557	43,173	40	5,082	54	36,767	77	83,659	5	9,792	16	6,256	1,359	59,879
Egra	629	41,418	76	11,537	49	32,167	74	90,730	3	9,498	2	154	1,595	62,200
Contai	983	50,945	99	10,557	81	46,690	102	120,128	5	12,223	10	1,602	2,316	90,552
Purba Medinipur district	3,253	219,794	293	32,965	261	159,032	397	466,093	19	44,241	45	10,759	7,974	375,042

Note: Primary schools include junior basic schools; middle schools, high schools and higher secondary schools include madrasahs; technical schools include junior technical schools, junior government polytechnics, industrial technical institutes, industrial training centres, nursing training institutes etc.; technical and professional colleges include engineering colleges, polytechnics, medical colleges, para-medical institutes, management colleges, teachers training and nursing training colleges, law colleges, art colleges, music colleges etc. Special and non-formal education centres include sishu siksha kendras, madhyamik siksha kendras, centres of Rabindra mukta vidyalaya, recognised Sanskrit tols, institutions for the blind and other handicapped persons, Anganwadi centres, reformatory schools etc.

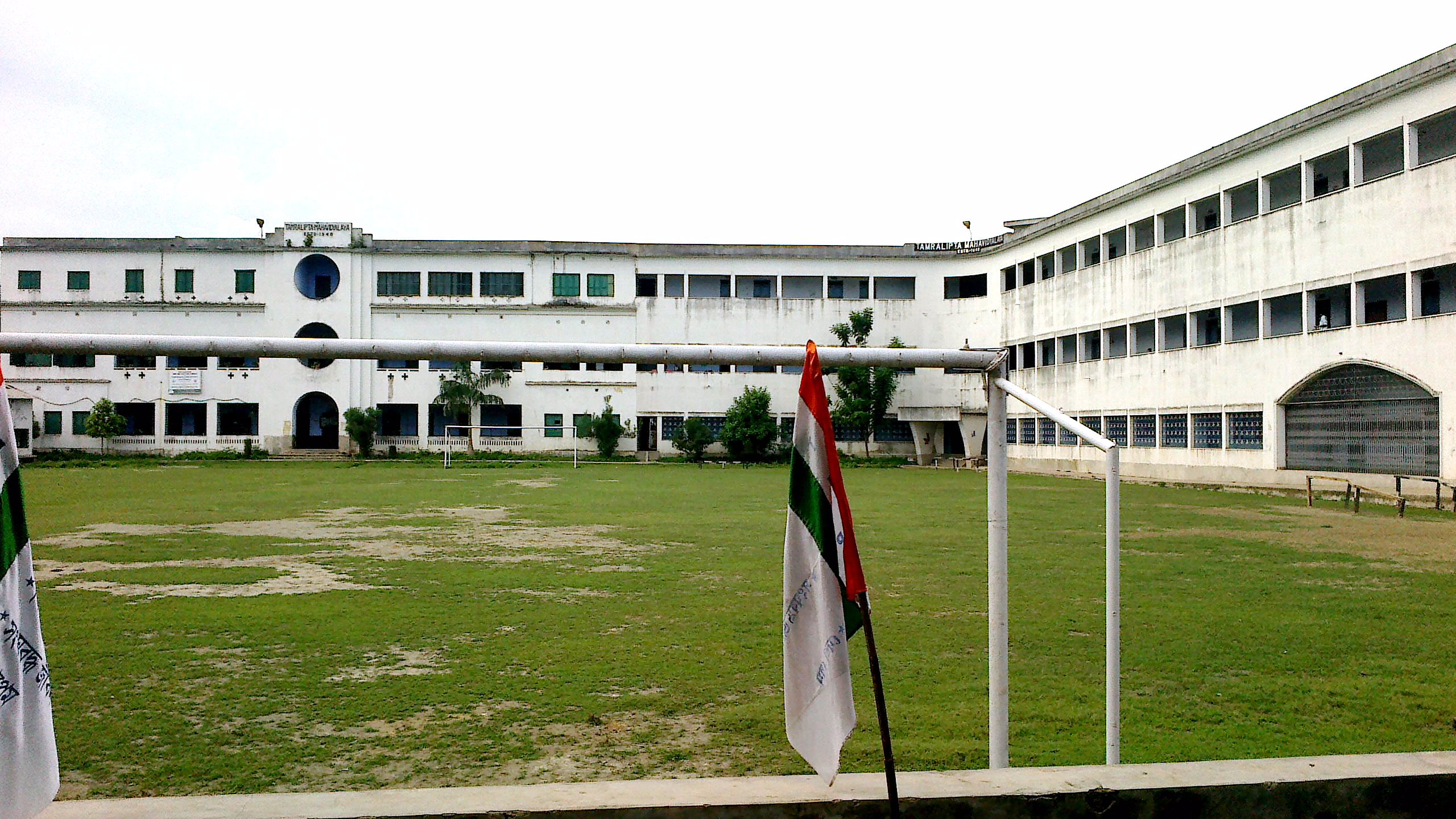
Tamralipta Mahavidyalaya, Tamluk

The following institutions are located in Tamluk subdivision:

- Tamralipta Mahavidyalaya was established at Tamluk in 1948. It is affiliated with Vidyasagar University. It offers courses in arts, science, commerce and education.
- College of Engineering and Management, Kolaghat, was established in 1998, in the township of Kolaghat Thermal Power Station. It is affiliated with Maulana Abul Kalam Azad University of Technology.
- Rabindra Bharati Mahavidyalaya was established at Kolaghat in 2010. It is affiliated with Vidyasagar University.
- Panskura Banamali College was established at Panskura in 1960. It is affiliated with Vidyasagar University. It offers undergraduate and post graduate courses.
- Moyna College was established 1972 at Moyna. It is affiliated with Vidyasagar University.
- Maharaja Nandakumar Mahavidyalaya was established at Bhabanipur in 2007. It is affiliated with Vidyasagar University.
- Siddhinath Mahavidyalaya, a government degree college, was established at Shyamsundarpur Patna in 2013.
- Tamralipta Institute of Management & Technology was established at Tamluk in 2007. It is affiliated to Maulana Abdul Kalam Azad University of Technology.
- Shahid Matangini Hazra Government College for Women was established in 2015 at Chak Srikrishnapur, Tamluk.

== Healthcare ==
The table below (all data in numbers) presents an overview of the medical facilities available and patients treated in the hospitals, health centres and sub-centres in 2014 in Purba Medinipur district.

Subdivision	Health & Family Welfare Deptt, WB				Other State Govt Deptts	Local bodies	Central Govt Deptts / PSUs	NGO / Private Nursing Homes	Total	Total Number of Beds	Total Number of Doctors	Indoor Patients	Outdoor Patients
Subdivision	Hospitals	Rural Hospitals	Block Primary Health Centres	Primary Health Centres	Other State Govt Deptts	Local bodies	Central Govt Deptts / PSUs	NGO / Private Nursing Homes	Total	Total Number of Beds	Total Number of Doctors	Indoor Patients	Outdoor Patients
Tamluk	1	-	7	14	-	-	-	70	92	1,506	96	61,84	1,251,099
Haldia	1	2	3	10	-	-	-	19	35	803	67	27,586	757,876
Egra	1	1	4	11	-	-	-	21	38	489	42	23,699	419,829
Contai	2	-	8	16	-	-	-	22	48	688	88	59,882	890,607
Purba Medinipur district	5	3	22	51	-	-	-	132	213	3,486	293	172,251	3,319,411

Medical facilities available in Tamluk subdivision are as follows:

Hospitals: (Name, location, beds)
District Hospital, Tamluk, 300 beds
Baroma Sirona Hospital, Dakshin Mechogram, PO Uttar Mechogram, Psychiatry clinic
Rural Hospitals: (Name, CD block, location, beds)
Uttar Mechogram Rural Hospital, Panskura CD block, Uttar Mechogram, PO Keshapat, 30 beds
Paikpari Rural Hospital, Kolaghat CD block, PO Kolaghat Notun Bazar, 30 beds
Anantapur Rural Hospital, Tamluk CD block, Anantapur, PO Chanserpur, 30 beds
H.S. Janubasan Rural Hospital, Sahid Matangini CD block, Janu Basan, PO Nonakuri Bazar, 30 beds
Erashal Rural Hospital, Chandipur CD block, Erashal, PO Math Chandipur, 30 beds
Khejurberia Rural Hospital, Nandakumar CD Block, PO Nandakumar, 30 beds
Block Primary Health Centre: (Name, block, location, beds)
Gar Moyna BPHC, Moyna CD Block, PO Moyna, 15 beds
Primary Health Centres: (CD block-wise)(CD block, PHC location, beds)
Panskura CD block: Purba Itarah, PO Raghunathbari (6), Patanda (10)
Kolaghat CD block: Machinan, PO Rain Gopalnagar (6), Nandaigajan, PO Bhogpur (10)
Tamluk CD block: Kelomal (10), Purbanakha, PO Putputia (10)
Sahid Matangini CD block: Ramchandrapur (10), Uttar Dhalhara, PO Dhalhara (2)
Chandipur CD block: Gokhuri, PO Majnaberia (2), Baraghuni (10)
Nandakumar CD block: Dakshin Damodarpur (10), Dakshin Gumai, PO Kalyanchak (2)
Moyna CD block: Ramchandrapur (2), Arangkianara (10)

== Electoral constituencies ==
Lok Sabha (parliamentary) and Vidhan Sabha (state assembly) constituencies in Purba Medinipur district were as follows:

Lok Sabha constituency	Vidhan Sabha constituency	Reservation	CD Block and/or Gram panchayats
Ghatal	Panskura Paschim	None	Panskura CD Block
	Other assembly segments in Paschim Medinipur district		
Tamluk	Tamluk	None	Tamluk municipality, Bishnubarh II, Pipulberia I, Pipulberia II and Uttar Sonamui gram panchayats of Tamluk CD Block, and Sahid Matangini CD Block
	Panskura Purba	None	Kolaghat CD Block
	Moyna	None	Moyna CD Block, Anantapur I, Anantapur II, Nilkunthia, Sreerampur I and Sreerampur II GPs of Tamluk CD Block
	Nandakumar	None	Nandakumar CD Block and Bishnubarh I, Padumpur I and Padumpur II GPs of Tamluk CD Block
	Mahisadal	None	Mahisadal and Haldia CD Blocks
	Haldia	SC	Haldia municipality and Sutahata CD Block
	Nandigram	None	Nandigram I and Nandigram II CD Blocks
Kanthi	Chandipur	None	Chandipur CD Block and Benodia, Bivisanpur, Gurgram, Kakra, Mahammadpur I and Mahammadpur II GPs of Bhagabanpur I CD Block
	Paashpur	None	Patashpur I CD Block; Khargram, Panchet, Pataspur, South Khanda and Sreerampur gram panchayats of Patashpur II CD Block
	Kanthi Uttar	None	Deshapran CD Block, Brajachauli, Debendra, Kanaidighi, Kumirda, Lauda and Marishda GPs of Contai III CD Block and Bathuari GP of Egra II CD Block
	Bhagabanpur	None	Bhagabanpur, Kajlagarh, Kotbarh and Shimulia GPs of Bhagabanpur I CD Block, Arjunnagar, Basudevberia, Baroj, Itaberia, Jukhia, Mugberia and Radhapur GPs of Bhagabanpur II CD Block, and Argoyal and Mathura GPs of Patashpur II CD Block
	Khejuri	SC	Khejuri I and Khejuri II CD Blocks, and Garbari I and Garbari II GPs of Bhagabanpur II CD Block
	Kanthi Dakshin	None	Contai municipality, Contai I CD Block, and Durmuth and Kusumpur GPs of Contai III CD Block
	Ramnagar	None	Ramnagar I and Ramnagar II CD Blocks

== Notable people ==
- Khan Bahadur Alfazuddin Ahmed, MLA of Midnapore
