= Kharisha =

Kharisa
- Census Town
- Location in West Bengal, India Kharisa (India)
- Coordinates: 22.4296°N 87.8511°E
- Country: India
- State: West Bengal
- District: Purba Medinipur

Area
  - Total: 1.3116 km^{2} (0.5064 sq mi)

Population (2011)
  - Total: 4,120
  - Density: 3,140/km^{2} (8,140/sq mi)

Languages
  - Official: Bengali, English
- Time zone: UTC+5:30 (IST)
- PIN: 721134 (Kolaghat)
- Telephone/STD code: 03228
- Lok Sabha constituency: Tamluk
- Vidhan Sabha constituency: Panskura Purba
- Website: purbamedinipur.gov.in

Kharisa is a census town in Kolaghat CD block in Tamluk subdivision of Purba Medinipur district in the state of West Bengal, India.

== Geography ==
Cities and towns in Tamluk subdivision of Purba Medinipur district
M: municipal city/ town, CT: census town, R: rural/ urban centre, H: historical/ religious centre
Owing to space constraints in the small map, the actual locations in a larger map may vary slightly

=== Location ===
Kharisa is located at 22.4296°N 87.8511°E.

=== Urbanisation ===
94.08% of the population of Tamluk subdivision live in the rural areas. Only 5.92% of the population live in the urban areas, and that is the second lowest proportion of urban population amongst the four subdivisions in Purba Medinipur district, just above Egra subdivision.

Note: The map alongside presents some of the notable locations in the subdivision. All places marked in the map are linked in the larger full screen map.

== Demographics ==
As per 2011 Census of India Kharisa had a total population of 4,120 of which 2,088 (51%) were males and 2,032 (49%) were females. Population below 6 years was 344. The total number of literates in Kharisa was 3,437 (91.02% of the population over 6 years).

== Infrastructure ==
As per the District Census Handbook 2011, Kharisha covered an area of 1.3116 km^{2}. It had the facility of a railway station at Mecheda 1.5 km away and bus route in the town. Amongst the civic amenities it had 37 road lighting points and 431 domestic electric connections. Amongst the medical facilities it had a hospital with 30 beds nearby and 8 medicine shops in the town. Amongst the educational facilities it had were 2 primary schools, 1 middle school, 1 secondary school and 1 senior secondary school in the town. The nearest degree college was at Tamluk 15 km away. Amongst the recreational and cultural facilities a cinema theatre and auditorium/ community hall were there at Mecheda 1.5 km away and a public library and a reading room in the town.

== Transport ==
A short stretch of local roads links Kharisha to National Highway 16 (Kolkata-Chennai Highway, with links to the highway leading to Mumbai).
