= Mihitikri =

- Census town
- Location in West Bengal, India Mihitikri (India)
- Coordinates: 22.4353°N 87.8436°E
- Country: India
- State: West Bengal
- District: Purba Medinipur

Area
  - Total: 2.1513 km^{2} (0.8306 sq mi)

Population (2011)
  - Total: 6,906
  - Density: 3,210/km^{2} (8,314/sq mi)

Languages
  - Official: Bengali, English
- Time zone: UTC+5:30 (IST)
- Telephone/STD code: 03228
- Lok Sabha constituency: Tamluk
- Vidhan Sabha constituency: Panskura Purba
- Website: purbamedinipur.gov.in

Mihitikri is a census town in Kolaghat CD block in Tamluk subdivision of Purba Medinipur district in the state of West Bengal, India.

== Geography ==
Cities and towns in Tamluk subdivision of Purba Medinipur district
M: municipal city/ town, CT: census town, R: rural/ urban centre, H: historical/ religious centre
Owing to space constraints in the small map, the actual locations in a larger map may vary slightly

=== Location ===
Mihitikri is located at 22.4353°N 87.8436°E.

=== Urbanisation ===
94.08% of the population of Tamluk subdivision live in the rural areas. Only 5.92% of the population live in the urban areas, and that is the second lowest proportion of urban population amongst the four subdivisions in Purba Medinipur district, just above Egra subdivision.

Note: The map alongside presents some of the notable locations in the subdivision. All places marked in the map are linked in the larger full screen map.

== Demographics ==
As per 2011 Census of India Mihitikri had a total population of 6,906 of which 3,541 (51%) were males and 3,365 (49%) were females. Population below 6 years was 630. The total number of literates in Mihitikri was 5,296 (84.38% of the population over 6 years).

== Infrastructure ==
As per the District Census Handbook 2011, Mihitikri covered an area of 2.1513 km^{2}. It had the facility of a railway station at Mecheda 3 km away and bus route in the town. Amongst the civic amenities it had 600 domestic electric connections. Amongst the medical facilities it had a hospital 2 km away, a nursing home 2 km away, a dispensary/ health centre 1 km away, a maternity home 1 km away and 1 medicine shop in the town. Amongst the educational facilities it had were 4 primary schools, 2 middle schools, 2 secondary schools and 1 senior secondary school in the town. The nearest degree college was at Panskura 14 km away. Amongst the recreational and cultural facilities a cinema theatre was there at Mecheda 4 km away and a reading room in the town.

== Transport ==
Mihitikri is off National Highway 16 (Kolkata-Mumbai Highway).
