= Shantipur, Purba Medinipur =

Shantipur
- Census Town
- Location in West Bengal, India Shantipur (India)
- Coordinates: 22.403581°N 87.868619°E
- Country: India
- State: West Bengal
- District: Purba Medinipur

Area
  - Total: 2.1332 km^{2} (0.8236 sq mi)

Population (2011)
  - Total: 9,746
  - Density: 4,569/km^{2} (11,830/sq mi)

Languages
  - Official: Bengali, English
- Time zone: UTC+5:30 (IST)
- PIN: 721134 (Kolaghat)
- Telephone/STD code: 03228
- Lok Sabha constituency: Tamluk
- Vidhan Sabha constituency: Tamluk
- Website: purbamedinipur.gov.in

Shantipur is a census town in Sahid Matangini CD block in Tamluk subdivision of Purba Medinipur district in the state of West Bengal, India.

== Geography ==
Cities and towns in Tamluk subdivision of Purba Medinipur district
M: municipal city/ town, CT: census town, R: rural/ urban centre, H: historical/ religious centre
Owing to space constraints in the small map, the actual locations in a larger map may vary slightly

=== Location ===
Shantipur is located at 22.403581°N 87.868619°E.

=== Urbanisation ===
94.08% of the population of Tamluk subdivision live in the rural areas. Only 5.92% of the population live in the urban areas, and that is the second lowest proportion of urban population amongst the four subdivisions in Purba Medinipur district, just above Egra subdivision.

Note: The map alongside presents some of the notable locations in the subdivision. All places marked in the map are linked in the larger full screen map.

== Demographics ==
As per 2011 Census of India Shantipur had a total population of 9,746 of which 4,979 (51%) were males and 4,767 (49%) were females. Population below 6 years was 1,017. The total number of literates in Shantipur was 7,677 (87.95% of the population over 6 years).

== Infrastructure ==
As per the District Census Handbook 2011, Shantipur covered an area of 2.1332 km^{2}. It had the facility of a railway station at Mecheda nearby and bus routes in the town. Amongst the civic amenities it had 1,500 domestic electric connections. Amongst the medical facilities it had a hospital 1 km away and 23 medicine shops in the town. Amongst the educational facilities it had were 8 primary schools. The nearest secondary school and senior secondary school were at Hakola 1.5 km away. The nearest degree college was 30 km away at Midnapore. Amongst the recreational and cultural facilities a cinema theatre was there in the town.

== Transport ==
Shantipur is on the Haldia-Tamluk-Mecheda Road.
