= Panskura (community development block) =

Panskura Panskura I
- Community development block
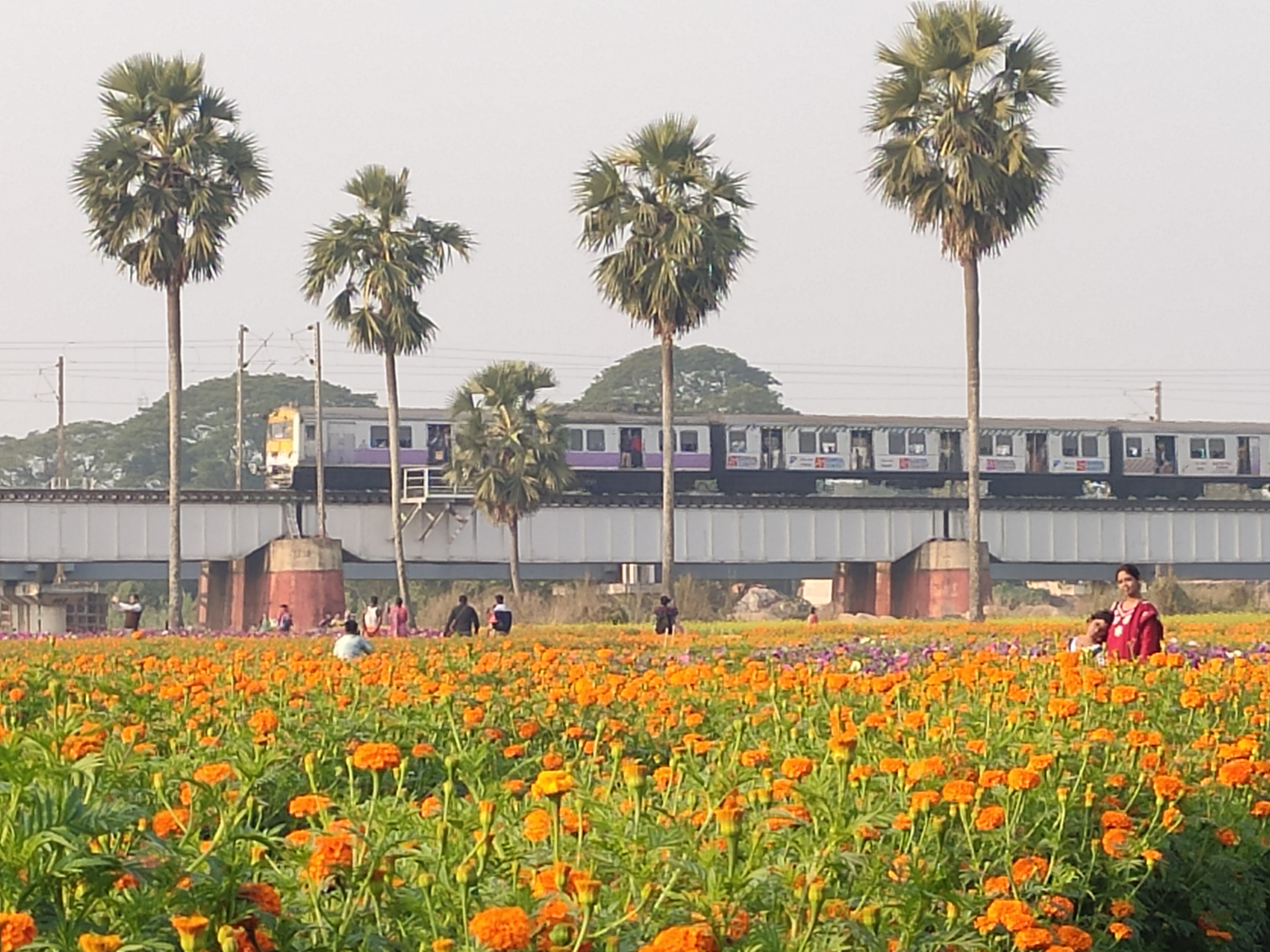
- Flower gardening in Panskura

- Coordinates: 22.397°N 87.741°E
- Country: India
- State: West Bengal
- District: Purba Medinipur

Government
  - Type: Community development block

Area
  - Total: 246.92 km^{2} (95.34 sq mi)
- Elevation: 9 m (30 ft)

Population (2011)
  - Total: 283,303
  - Density: 1,147.3/km^{2} (2,971.6/sq mi)

Languages
  - Official: Bengali, English
- Time zone: UTC+5:30 (IST)
- PIN: 721139 (Panskura); 721645 (Chaitannyapur); 721131 (Haur)
- Area code: 03228
- ISO 3166 code: IN-WB
- Vehicle registration: WB-29, WB-30, WB-31, WB-32, WB-33
- Literacy: 83.65%
- Lok Sabha constituency: Ghatal
- Vidhan Sabha constituency: Panskura Paschim
- Website: purbamedinipur.gov.in

Panskura is a community development block that forms an administrative division in Tamluk subdivision of Purba Medinipur district in the Indian state of West Bengal.

== Geography ==
Purba Medinipur district is part of the lower Indo-Gangetic Plain and Eastern coastal plains. Topographically, the district can be divided into two parts – (a) almost entirely flat plains on the west, east and north, (b) the coastal plains on the south. The vast expanse of land is formed of alluvium and is composed of younger and coastal alluvial. The elevation of the district is within 10 metres above mean sea level. The district has a long coastline of 65.5 km along its southern and south eastern boundary. Five coastal CD Blocks, namely, Khejuri II, Contai II (Deshapran), Contai I, Ramnagar I and II, are occasionally affected by cyclones and tornadoes. Tidal floods are quite regular in these five CD Blocks. Normally floods occur in 21 of the 25 CD Blocks in the district. The major rivers are Haldi, Rupnarayan, Rasulpur, Bagui and Keleghai, flowing in north to south or south-east direction. River water is an important source of irrigation. The district has a low 899 hectare forest cover, which is 0.02% of its geographical area.

Panskura is located at 22°23′49″N 87°44′28″E.

Panskura CD Block is bounded by Daspur I CD Block, in Paschim Medinipur district, in the north, Kolaghat and Tamluk CD Blocks, in the east, Moyna CD Block in the south and Debra and Pingla CD Blocks, in Paschim Medinipur district, in the west.

It is located 26 km from Tamluk, the district headquarters.

Panskura CD Block has an area of 246.92 km^{2} (including Panskura municipality). It has 1 panchayat samity, 14 gram panchayats, 208 gram sansads (village councils), 247 mouzas and 225 inhabited villages. Panskura police station serves this block. The block was earlier named Panskura I and in 2011 it was renamed Panskura. Headquarters of this CD Block is at Panskura.

Gram panchayats of Panskura block/ panchayat samiti are: Chaitanyapur I, Chaitanyapur II, Ghoshpur, Gobindanagar, Haur, Keshapat, Khandakhola, Mysora, Panskura I, Pratapur I, Pratapur II, Purusottampur, Radhaballavchak and Raghunathbari.

== Demographics ==
=== Population ===
As per 2011 Census of India Panskura CD Block had a total population of 283,303, all of which were rural. There were 145,563 (51%) males and 137,740 (49%) females. Population below 6 years was 32,726. Scheduled Castes numbered 29,183 (10.30%) and Scheduled Tribes numbered 12,531 (4.42%).

As per 2001 census, Panskura I block had a total population of 298,163, out of which 152,618 were males and 145,545 were females. Panskura I block registered a population growth of 15.62 per cent during the 1991-2001 decade. Decadal growth for the combined Midnapore district was 14.87 per cent. Decadal growth in West Bengal was 17.84 per cent.

Large villages (with 4,000+ population) in Panskura CD block (2011 census figures in brackets): Jiakhali (6,672), Kamila (4,369), Baharputa (4,660) and Radhaballav Chak (4,489).

Other villages in Panskura CD block include(2011 census figures in brackets): Dakshin Maynadal (1,024), Purbba Gopalpur (1,110).

=== Literacy ===
As per 2011 census the total number of literates in Panskura CD Block was 209,614 (83.65% of the population over 6 years) out of which 116,589 (56%) were males and 93,025 (44%) were females. As per 2011 census, literacy in Purba Medinipur district was 87.02%. Purba Medinipur had the highest literacy amongst all the districts of West Bengal in 2011.

See also – List of West Bengal districts ranked by literacy rate

Literacy in CD blocks of
Purba Medinipur district
Tamluk subdivision
Tamluk – 87.06%
Sahid Matangini – 86.99%
Panskura I – 83.65%
Panskura II – 84.93%
Nandakumar – 85.56%
Chandipur – 87.81%
Moyna – 86.33%
Haldia subdivision
Mahishadal – 86.21%
Nandigram I – 84.89%
Nandigram II – 89.16%
Sutahata – 85.42%
Haldia – 85.96%
Contai subdivision
Contai I – 89.32%
Contai II – 88.33%
Contai III – 89.88%
Khejuri I – 88.90%
Khejuri II – 85.37%
Ramnagar I – 87.84%
Ramnagar II – 89.38%
Bhagabanpur II – 90.98%
Egra subdivision
Bhagabanpur I – 88.13%
Egra I – 82.83%
Egra II – 86.47%
Patashpur I – 86.58%
Patashpur II – 86.50%
2011 Census: CD Block Wise

Primary Census Abstract Data

=== Language and religion ===
Religion in Panskura CD block (2011)
Hinduism	80.61%
Islam	19.25%
Other or not stated	0.14%

In 2011 census Hindus numbered 228,369 and formed 80.61% of the population in Panskura CD Block. Muslims numbered 54,538 and formed 19.25% of the population. Others numbered 396 and formed 0.14% of the population. In 2001, Hindus made up 78.08% and Muslims 21.78% of the population respectively.

Languages of Panskura CD block (2011)
1. Bengali (94.7%)
2. Khortha (1.75%)
3. Santali (1.62%)
4. Hindi (1.55%)
5. Others (0.39%)

According to the 2011 census, 94.69% of the population spoke Bengali, 1.75% Khortha, 1.62% Santali and 1.55% Hindi as their first language.

== Rural poverty ==
The District Human Development Report for Purba Medinipur has provided a CD Block-wise data table for Modified Human Poverty Index of the district. Panskura CD Block registered 21.00 on the MHPI scale. The CD Block-wise mean MHPI was estimated at 24.9. Eleven out of twentyfive CD Blocks were found to be severely deprived in respect of grand CD Block average value of MHPI (CD Blocks with lower amount of poverty are better): All the CD Blocks of Haldia and Contai subdivisions appeared backward, except Ramnagar I & II, of all the blocks of Egra subdivision only Bhagabanpur I appeared backward and in Tamluk subdivision none appeared backward.

== Economy ==
=== Livelihood ===
In Panskura CD Block in 2011, total workers formed 45.93% of the total population and amongst the class of total workers, cultivators formed 23.81%, agricultural labourers 35.75%, household industry workers 9.73% and other workers 30.71%.

=== Infrastructure ===
There are 225 inhabited villages in Panskura CD block. All 225 villages (100%) have power supply. All 225 villages (100%) have drinking water supply. 34 villages (15.11%) have post offices. 220 villages (97.78%) have telephones (including landlines, public call offices and mobile phones). 56 villages (24.89%) have a pucca (paved) approach road and 44 villages (19.56%) have transport communication (includes bus service, rail facility and navigable waterways). 11 villages (4.89%) have agricultural credit societies. 10 villages (4.44%) have banks.

In 2007-08, around 40% of rural households in the district had electricity.

In 2013-14, there were 96 fertiliser depots, 11 seed stores and 50 fair price shops in the CD Block.

=== Agriculture ===
Persons engaged in agriculture
in Panskura CD Block
1. Bargadars (4.31%)
2. Patta holders (7.49%)
3. Small farmers (2.48%)
4. Marginal farmers (36.1%)
5. Agricultural labourers (49.6%)

According to the District Human Development Report of Purba Medinipur: The agricultural sector is the lifeline of a predominantly rural economy. It is largely dependent on the Low Capacity Deep Tubewells (around 50%) or High Capacity Deep Tubewells (around 27%) for irrigation, as the district does not have a good network of canals, compared to some of the neighbouring districts. In many cases the canals are drainage canals which get the backflow of river water at times of high tide or the rainy season. The average size of land holding in Purba Medinipur, in 2005-06, was 0.73 hectares against 1.01 hectares in West Bengal.

In 2013-14, the total area irrigated in Panskura CD Block was 12,111 hectares, out of which 777 hectares were irrigated by canal water, 1,161 hectares by tank water, 8,697 hectares by deep tube wells, 696 hectares by shallow tube wells and 780 hectares by river lift irrigation.

Although the Bargadari Act of 1950 recognised the rights of bargadars to a higher share of crops from the land that they tilled, it was not implemented fully. Large tracts, beyond the prescribed limit of land ceiling, remained with the rich landlords. From 1977 onwards major land reforms took place in West Bengal. Land in excess of land ceiling was acquired and distributed amongst the peasants. Following land reforms land ownership pattern has undergone transformation. In 2013-14, persons engaged in agriculture in Panskura CD Block could be classified as follows: bargadars 4.31%, patta (document) holders 7.49%, small farmers (possessing land between 1 and 2 hectares) 2.48%, marginal farmers (possessing land up to 1 hectare) 36.10% and agricultural labourers 49.62%.

In 2013-14, Panskura CD Block produced 149 tonnes of Aman paddy, the main winter crop, from 2,614 hectares, 39,650 tonnes of Boro paddy, the spring crop, from 11,926 hectares, 449 tonnes of Aus paddy, the summer crop, from 621 hectares, and 51,815 tonnes of potatoes from 102 hectares. It also produced pulses and oil seeds.

Betelvine is a major source of livelihood in Purba Medinipur district, particularly in Tamluk and Contai subdivisions. Betelvine production in 2008-09 was the highest amongst all the districts and was around a third of the total state production. In 2008-09, Purba Mednipur produced 2,789 tonnes of cashew nuts from 3,340 hectares of land.

=== Floriculture ===
West Bengal is the third largest producer of flower in the country. The two leading flower producing districts of West Bengal are Purba Medinipur and Nadia. Purba Medinipur leads in both cropped area and production, although floriculture in the district remains in its infancy. There is great potentiality of flower production particularly in three CD Blocks – Kolaghat, Panskura and Sahid Matangini.

In 2007-08 in Purba Medinipur district 31.750 crore spikes of rose were produced from 555 hectares, 4,880 tonnes of chrysanthemum were produced from 150 hectares, 4.140 crore spikes of gladiolus were produced from 250 hectares, 13.310 crore spikes of tube rose were produced from 451 hectares, 10,140 tonnes marigold were produced from 1,115 hectares, 370 tonnes of jasmine were produced from 280 hectares, and 1,645 tonnes of season flowers were produced from 1,255 hectares.

Concentration of Handicraft Activities in CD Blocks
- Horn Craft - Kolaghat
- Pata Chitra - Chandipur, Nandakumar
- Sea Shell – Ramnagar I & II
- Mat & Mat Diversified Products – Ramnagar I, Egra I & II, Patashpur I
- Brass & Bell Metal – Ramnagar I, Mahisadal, Patashpur II, Egra I
- Diversified Jute Products – Ramnagar II, Nandakumar, Kolaghat, Shahid Matangini
- Cane & Bamboo Products - Chandipur, Nandakumar, Kolaghat, Shahid Matangini
- Sola Craft - Tamluk, Kolaghat
- Pottery/Terracotta - Panskura, Tamluk, Sahid Matangini, Nandakumar
- Wood Craft - Tamluk
- Zari work - Sutahta, Mahisadal, Haldia, Nandakumar

Source: District Human Development Report, Purba Medinipur, Page 97

=== Pisciculture ===
Purba Medinipur's net district domestic product derives one fifth of its earnings from fisheries, the highest amongst all the districts of West Bengal. The nett area available for affective pisciculture in Panskura CD Block in 2013-14 was 757.73 hectares. 3,940 persons were engaged in the profession and approximate annual production was 28,869 quintals.

=== Banking ===
In 2013-14, Panskura CD Block had offices of 12 commercial banks and 2 gramin banks.

=== Backward Regions Grant Fund ===
Medinipur East district is listed as a backward region and receives financial support from the Backward Regions Grant Fund. The fund, created by the Government of India, is designed to redress regional imbalances in development. As of 2012, 272 districts across the country were listed under this scheme. The list includes 11 districts of West Bengal.

== Transport ==
Panskura CD Block has 15 ferry services and 15 originating/ terminating bus routes.

Panskura railway station is on the Howrah-Kharagpur line. The Howrah-Kharagpur line was constructed in 1900. The Howrah–Kharagpur line was electrified in 1967-69.

The Dankuni-Kharagpur sector of NH 16 passes through this block.

== Education ==
In 2013-14, Panskura CD Block had 180 primary schools with 14,542 students, 13 middle schools with 977 students, 15 high schools with 6,146 students and 23 higher secondary schools with 23,389 students. Panskura CD Block had 1 general college with 85 students, 4 professional/ technical institutions with 350 students, 559 institutions for special and non-formal education with 23,060 students.

As per the 2011 census, in Panskura CD block, amongst the 225 inhabited villages, 14 villages did not have a school, 68 villages had two or more primary schools, 55 villages had at least 1 primary and 1 middle school and 35 villages had at least 1 middle and 1 secondary school.

Panskura Banamali College was established at Panskura in 1960. It is affiliated with Vidyasagar University. It offers undergraduate and post graduate courses.

Siddhinath Mahavidyalaya, a government degree college, was established at Shyamsundarpur Patna in 2013.

== Healthcare ==
In 2014, Panskura CD Block had 1 block primary health centre, 2 primary health centres, and 6 private nursing homes with total 110 beds and 10 doctors (excluding private bodies). It had 44 family welfare sub centres. 2,990 patients were treated indoor and 96,429 patients were treated outdoor in the hospitals, health centres and subcentres of the CD Block.

Uttar Mechogram Rural Hospital at Uttar Mechogram, PO Keshapat (with 30 beds) is the main medical facility in Panskura CD block. There are primary health centres at Purba Itarah, PO Raghunathbari (with 6 beds) and Patanda (with 10 beds).

== Panskura picture gallery ==
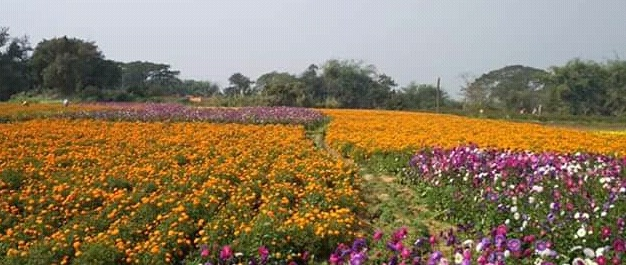
Valley of Flowers in Pansura

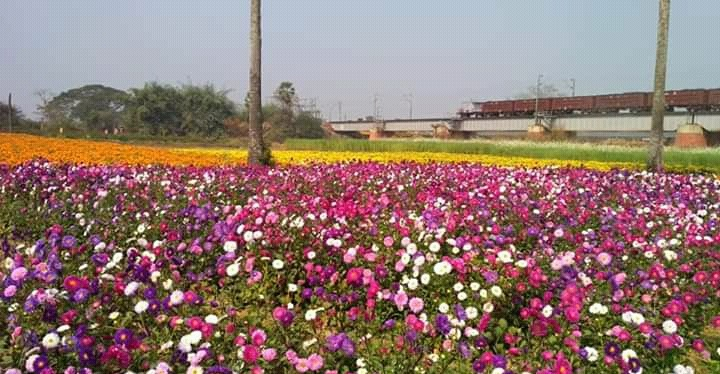
Valley of Flowers in Panskura

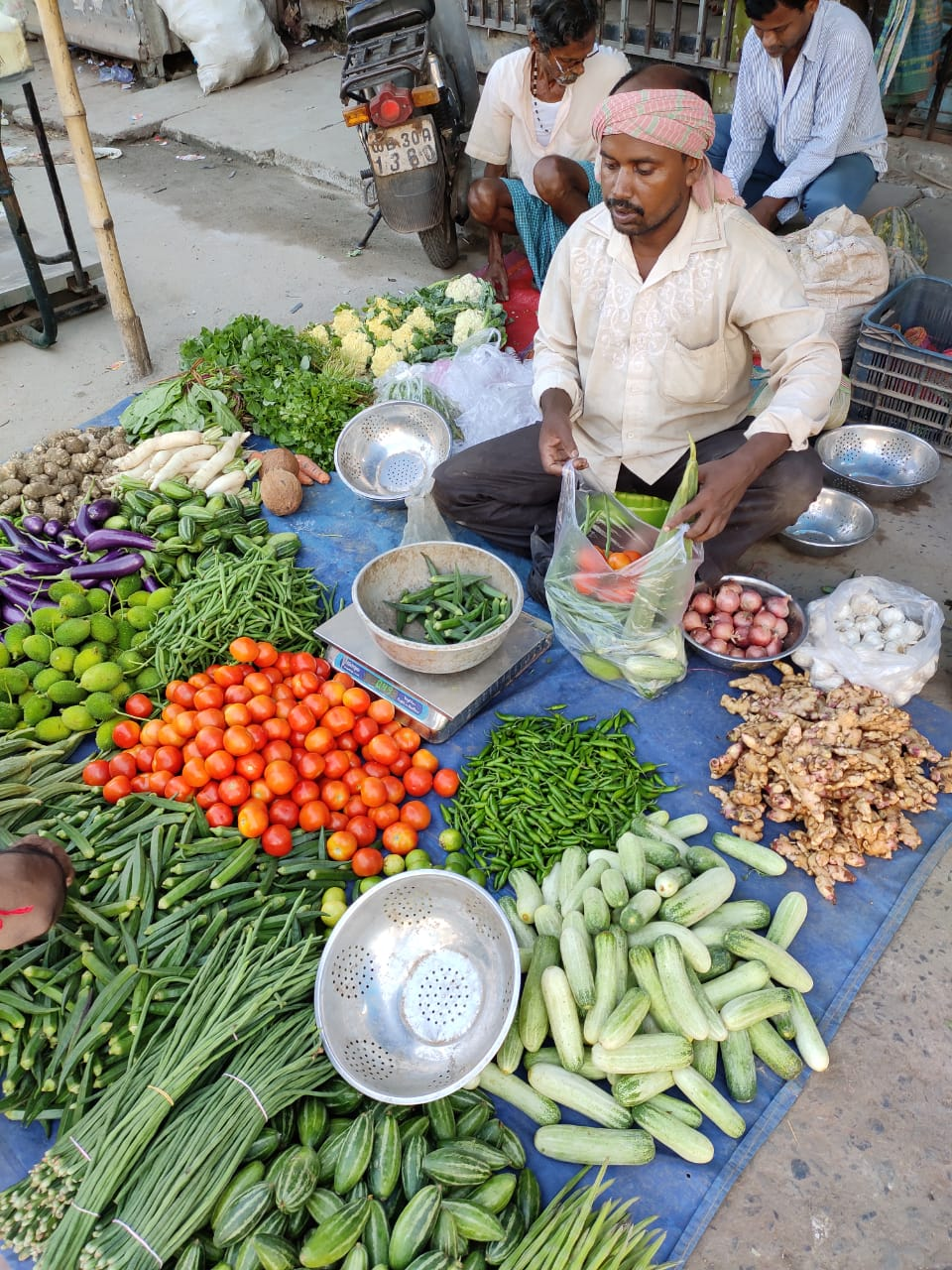
Panskura Station Sobji Bazar seller

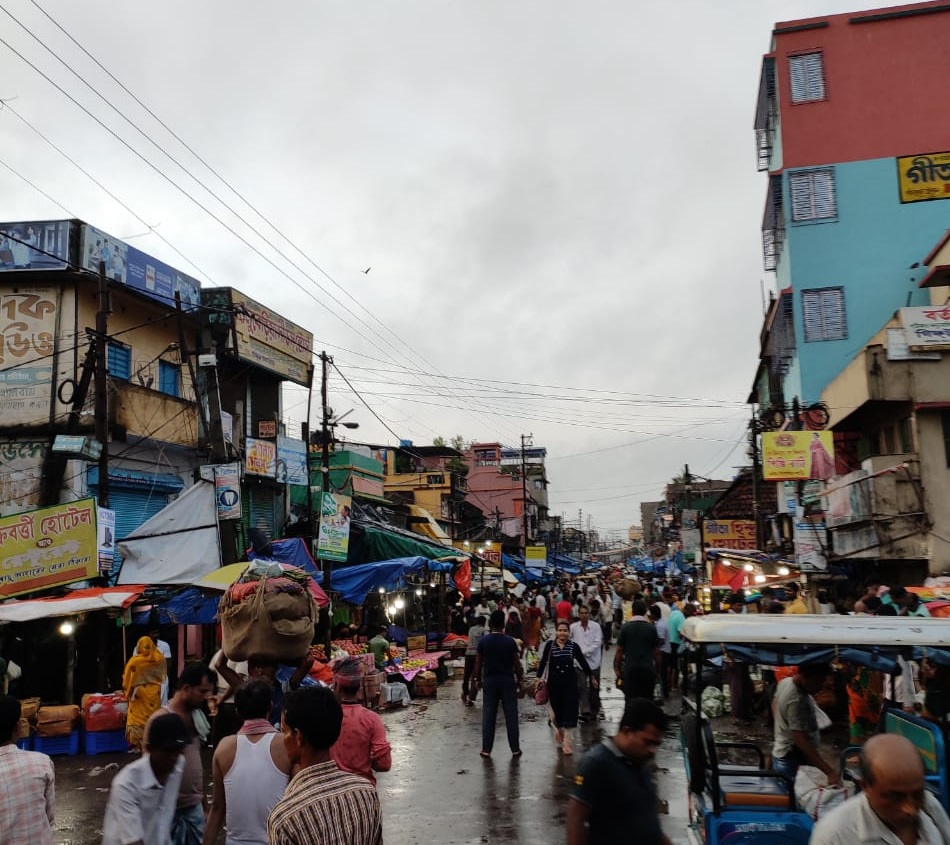
Panskura Station Sobji Bazar

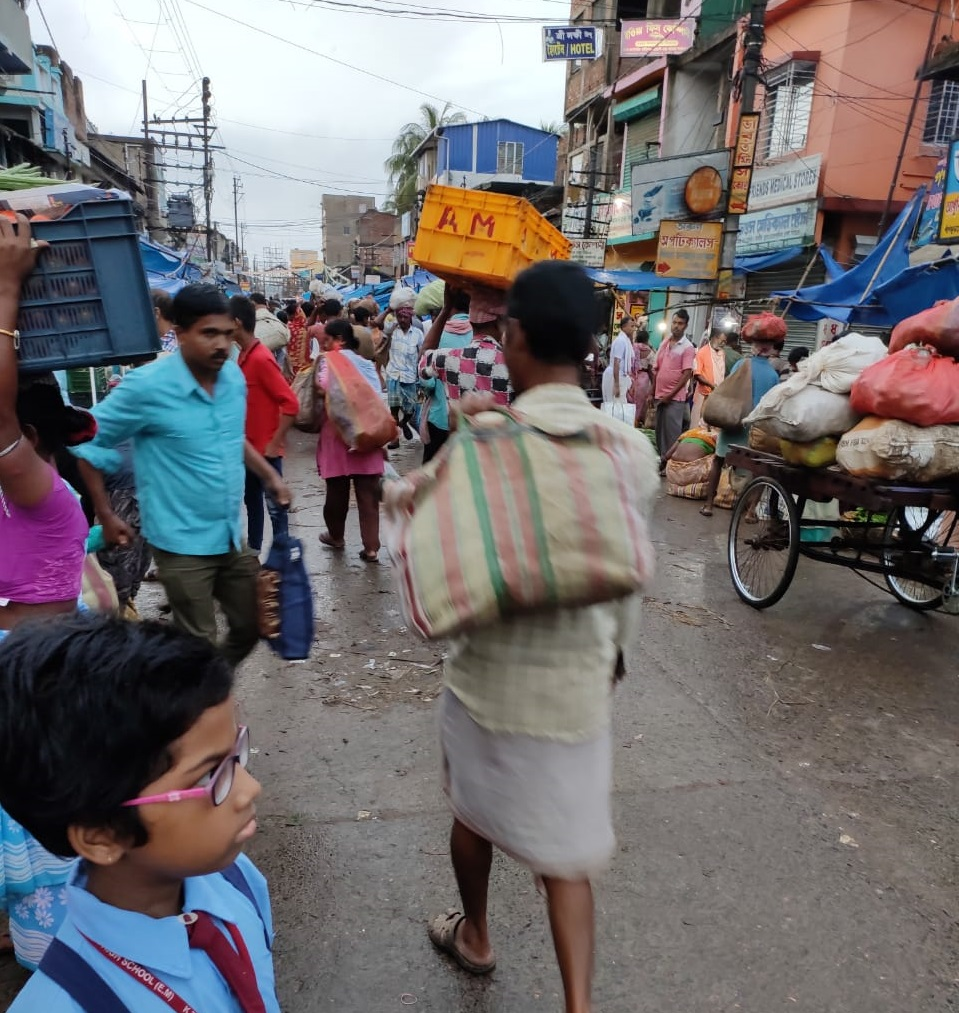
Panskura Station Road

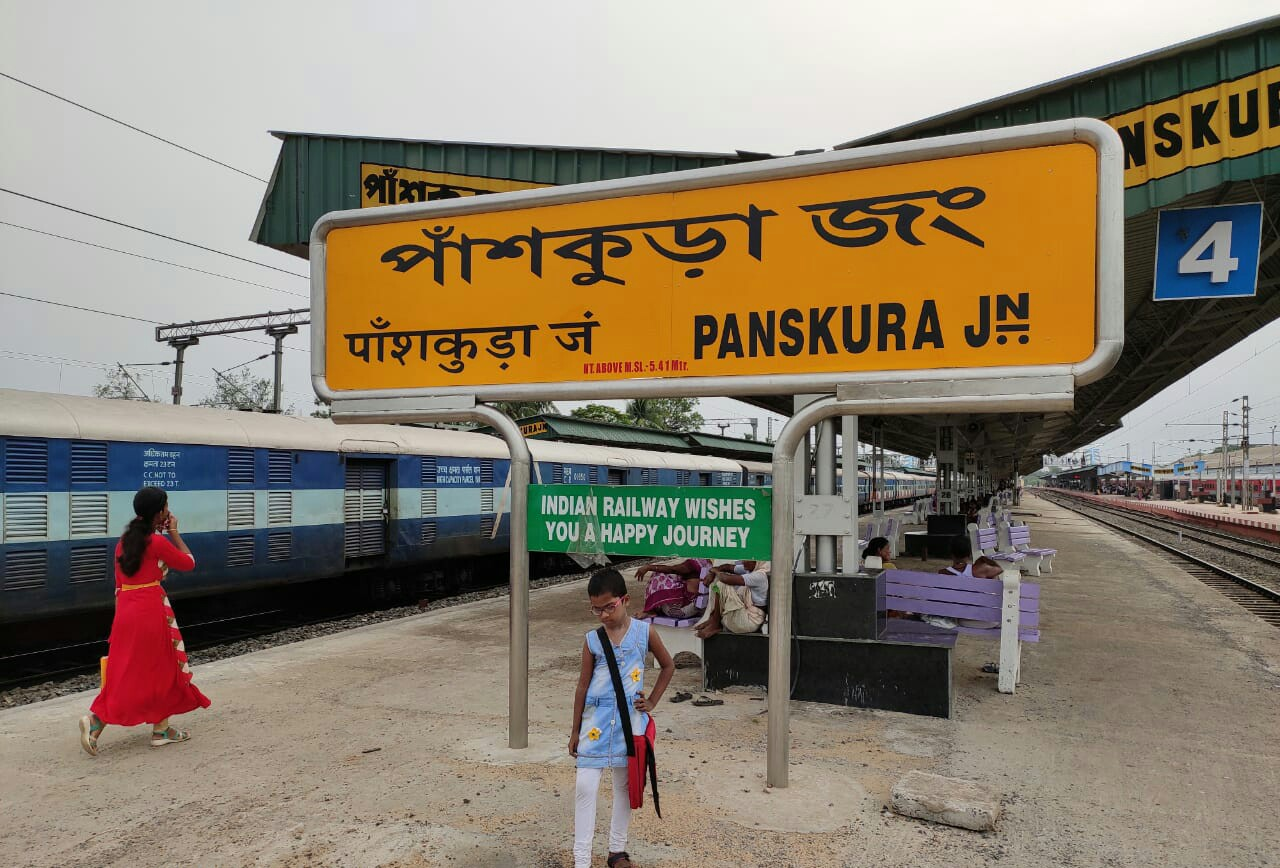
Panskura Junction railway station

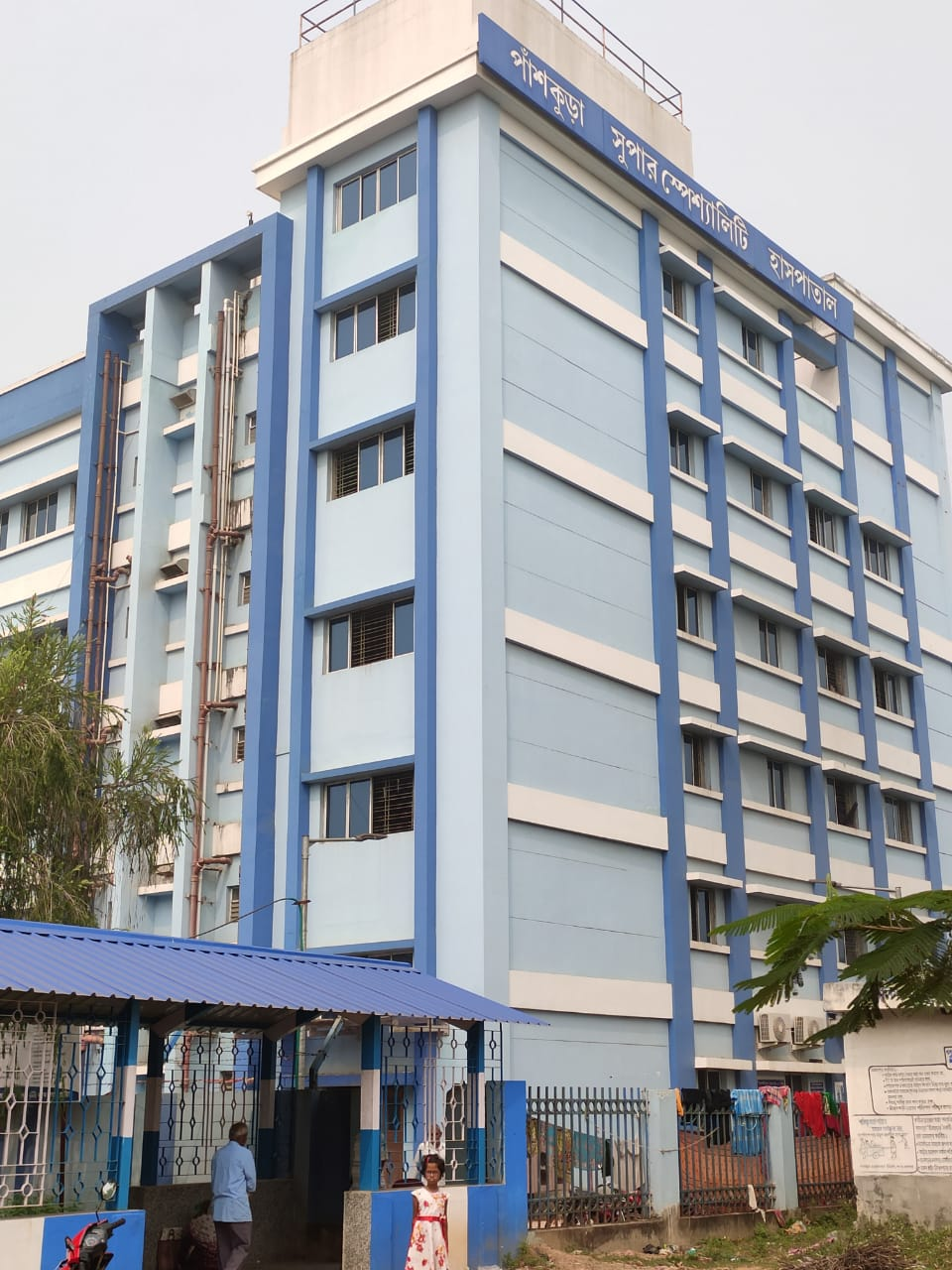
Panskura Super Speciality Hospital
