= Janu Basan =

- Village
- Location in West Bengal, India Janu Basan (India)
- Coordinates: 22.360581°N 87.891819°E
- Country: India
- State: West Bengal
- District: Purba Medinipur

Population (2011)
  - Total: 5,363

Languages
  - Official: Bengali, English
- Time zone: UTC+5:30 (IST)
- PIN: 721172 (Nonakuri Bazar)
- Telephone/STD code: 03228
- Lok Sabha constituency: Tamluk
- Vidhan Sabha constituency: Tamluk
- Website: purbamedinipur.gov.in

Janu Basan (also written as Janubasan) is a village in Sahid Matangini CD block in Tamluk subdivision of Purba Medinipur district in the state of West Bengal, India.

== Geography ==
Cities and towns in Tamluk subdivision of Purba Medinipur district
M: municipal city/ town, CT: census town, R: rural/ urban centre, H: historical/ religious centre
Owing to space constraints in the small map, the actual locations in a larger map may vary slightly

=== Location ===
Janu Basan is located at 22.360581°N 87.891819°E.

=== Urbanisation ===
94.08% of the population of Tamluk subdivision live in the rural areas. Only 5.92% of the population live in the urban areas, and that is the second lowest proportion of urban population amongst the four subdivisions in Purba Medinipur district, just above Egra subdivision.

Note: The map alongside presents some of the notable locations in the subdivision. All places marked in the map are linked in the larger full screen map.

== Demographics ==
As per 2011 Census of India Janubasan had a total population of 5,363 of which 2,769 (52%) were males and 2,594 (48%) were females. Population below 6 years was 591. The total number of literates in Janubasan was 4,059 (89.59% of the population over 6 years).

== Transport ==
Janu Basan is on the Haldia-Tamluk-Mecheda Road.

== Healthcare ==
H.S. Janubasan Rural Hospital at Janu Basan, PO Nonakuri Bazar (with 30 beds) is the main medical facility in Sahid Matangini CD block. There are primary health centres at Ramchandrapur (with 10 beds) and Uttar Dhalhara, PO Dhalhara (with 2 beds).
