= West Bengal Power Development Corporation =

Indian electricity agency

The West Bengal Power Development Corporation Limited
- Type: West Bengal Govt Owned Organization
- Industry: Electricity
- Predecessor: West Bengal State Electricity Board
- Founded: Formed in July 1985 with only one generating unit at Kolaghat TPS.
- Founder: West Bengal Government
- Headquarters: Bidhannagar, Kolkata, India
- Key people: Dr. P. B. Salim, IAS (Chairman & Managing Director)
- Products: Electric power
- Revenue: ▲₹9,277.84 crore (US$970 million) (2017–18)
- Owner: Government of West Bengal
- Website: www.wbpdcl.co.in

The West Bengal Power Development Corporation Limited (WBPDCL) is a non-listed company wholly owned and controlled by the Government of the Indian state of West Bengal and tasked with thermal power generation in the state. Its thermal power plants are in Kolaghat, Bakreswar, Sagardighi, Santaldih, and Bandel.

The corporation works in tandem with the West Bengal State Electricity Board.

- Kolaghat Thermal Power Station have a total installed capacity of 840 MW (4×210 MW).
- Bakreswar Thermal Power Station have a total installed capacity of 1050 MW (5×210 MW).
- Sagardighi Thermal Power Project have a total installed capacity of 1,600 MW (2×300 MW, 2×500 MW).
- Bandel Thermal Power Station have a total installed capacity of 335 MW (2×60, 1×215 MW). Renovation & modernisation of 215 MW unit is modified from 210 MW.
- Santaldih Thermal Power Station have a total installed capacity of 500 MW (2×250 MW).
