= Uttar Mechogram =

- Village
- Location in West Bengal, India Uttar Mechogram (India)
- Coordinates: 22.4246°N 87.7394°E
- Country: India
- State: West Bengal
- District: Purba Medinipur

Population (2011)
  - Total: 3,072

Languages
  - Official: Bengali, English
- Time zone: UTC+5:30 (IST)
- PIN: 721139 (Keshapat)
- Telephone/STD code: 03228
- Lok Sabha constituency: Ghatal
- Vidhan Sabha constituency: Panskura Paschim
- Website: purbamedinipur.gov.in

Uttar Mechogram (also called Uttar Mechgram) is a village, in Panskura CD block in Tamluk subdivision of Purba Medinipur district in the state of West Bengal, India.

== Geography ==
Cities and towns in Tamluk subdivision of East Midnapore district
M: municipal city/ town, CT: census town, R: rural/ urban centre, H: historical/ religious centre
Owing to space constraints in the small map, the actual locations in a larger map may vary slightly

=== Location ===
North Mechogram is located at 22.4246°N 87.7394°E

=== Urbanisation ===
94.08% of the population of Tamluk subdivision live in the rural areas. Only 5.92% of the population live in the urban areas, and that is the second lowest proportion of urban population amongst the four subdivisions in East Midnapore above Egra subdivision.

Note: The map alongside presents some of the notable locations in the subdivision. All places marked in the map are linked in the larger full screen map.

== Demographics ==
As per 2011 Census of India North Mechogram had a total population of 3,072 of which 1,571 (51%) were males and 1,501 (49%) were females. Population below 6 years was 283. The total number of literates in North Mechogram was 2,309 (82.79% of the population over 6 years).

== Transport ==
National Highway 116B passes through Panskura, located nearby.

== Healthcare ==
North Mechogram Rural Hospital at North Mechogram, PO Keshapat (with 30 beds) is the main medical facility in Panskura CD block. There are primary health centres at Eastah, PO Raghunathbari (with 6 beds) and Patanda (with 10 beds).
