= Kakdihi =

- Census Town
- Location in West Bengal, India Kakdihi (India)
- Coordinates: 22.41227°N 87.87834°E
- Country: India
- State: West Bengal
- District: Purba Medinipur

Area
  - Total: 2.17 km^{2} (0.84 sq mi)

Population (2011)
  - Total: 5,477
  - Density: 2,520/km^{2} (6,540/sq mi)

Languages
  - Official: Bengali, English
- Time zone: UTC+5:30 (IST)
- PIN: 721137 (Kakdihi)
- Telephone/STD code: 03228
- ISO 3166 code: IN-WB
- Vehicle registration: WB
- Lok Sabha constituency: Tamluk
- Vidhan Sabha constituency: Tamluk
- Website: purbamedinipur.gov.in

Kakdihi is a census town in Sahid Matangini CD Block in Purba Medinipur district in the Indian state of West Bengal.

== Geography ==
Cities and towns in Tamluk subdivision of Purba Medinipur district
M: municipal city/ town, CT: census town, R: rural/ urban centre, H: historical/ religious centre
Owing to space constraints in the small map, the actual locations in a larger map may vary slightly

=== Location ===
Kakdihi is located at 22.41227°N 87.87834°E.

=== Urbanisation ===
94.08% of the population of Tamluk subdivision live in the rural areas. Only 5.92% of the population live in the urban areas, and that is the second lowest proportion of urban population amongst the four subdivisions in Purba Medinipur district, just above Egra subdivision.

Note: The map alongside presents some of the notable locations in the subdivision. All places marked in the map are linked in the larger full screen map.

== Demographics ==
As per 2011 Census of India Kakdihi had a total population of 5,477 of which 2,813 (51%) were males and 2,664 (49%) were females. Population below 6 years was 511. The total number of literates in Kakdihi was 4,463 (89.07% of the population over 6 years).

As of 2001 India census, Kakdihi had a population of 4879. Males constitute 52% of the population and females 48%. Kakdihi has an average literacy rate of 76%, higher than the national average of 59.5%: male literacy is 83%, and female literacy is 68%. In Kakdihi, 11% of the population is under 6 years of age.

== Infrastructure ==
As per the District Census Handbook 2011, Kakdihi covered an area of 2.17 km^{2}. It had the facility of a railway station at Mecheda nearby and bus routes in the town. Amongst the civic amenities it had 10 road light points and 1,100 domestic electric connections. Amongst the medical facilities it had 2 nursing homes with 40 beds and 5 medicine shops in the town. Amongst the educational facilities it had were 8 primary schools. The nearest secondary school and senior secondary school were at Baman 1 km away. Amongst the recreational and cultural facilities a cinema theatre was there at Shantipur 1 km away.
