= Kolaghat (community development block) =

Kolaghat Panskura II
- Community development block
- Coordinates: 22.43°N 87.87°E
- Country: India
- State: West Bengal
- District: Purba Medinipur

Government
  - Type: Community development block

Area
  - Total: 147.91 km^{2} (57.11 sq mi)
- Elevation: 9 m (30 ft)

Population (2011)
  - Total: 290,124
  - Density: 1,961.5/km^{2} (5,080.2/sq mi)

Languages
  - Official: Bengali, English
- Time zone: UTC+5:30 (IST)
- PIN: 721134, 721151, 721158 & 721168
- Area code: +91 03228
- ISO 3166 code: IN-WB
- Vehicle registration: WB-29, WB-30, WB-31, WB-32, WB-33
- Literacy: 84.93%
- Lok Sabha constituency: Tamluk
- Vidhan Sabha constituency: Panskura Purba
- Website: purbamedinipur.gov.in

Kolaghat (earlier referred to as Panskura II block) is a community development block that forms an administrative division in Tamluk subdivision of Purba Medinipur district in the Indian state of West Bengal. The first chairman of Kolaghat CD block was freedom fighter, teacher, social activist Late Shri Birbhadra Gauri from Saradabasan village, under Sagarbarh Gram Panchayat of Kolaghat CD Block.

== Geography ==
Purba Medinipur district is part of the lower Indo-Gangetic Plain and Eastern coastal plains. Topographically, the district can be divided into two parts – (a) almost entirely flat plains on the west, east and north, (b) the coastal plains on the south. The vast expanse of land is formed of alluvium and is composed of younger and coastal alluvial. The elevation of the district is within 10 metres above mean sea level. The district has a long coastline of 65.5 km along its southern and south eastern boundary. Five coastal CD Blocks, namely, Khejuri II, Contai II (Deshapran), Contai I, Ramnagar I and II, are occasionally affected by cyclones and tornadoes. Tidal floods are quite regular in these five CD Blocks. Normally floods occur in 21 of the 25 CD Blocks in the district. The major rivers are Haldi, Rupnarayan, Rasulpur, Bagui and Keleghai, flowing in north to south or south-east direction. River water is an important source of irrigation. The district has a low 899 hectare forest cover, which is 0.02% of its geographical area.

Kolaghat is located at 22°26′N 87°52′E.

Kolaghat CD Block is bounded by Daspur I CD Block, in Paschim Medinipur district, in the north, Bagnan I and Bagnan II CD Blocks, in Howrah district across the Rupnarayan, and Sahid Matangini CD Block in the east, Tamluk CD Block in the south and Panskura CD Block in the west.

It is located 19 km from Tamluk, the district headquarters.

Kolaghat CD Block has an area of 147.91 km^{2}. It has 1 panchayat samity, 13 gram panchayats, 217 gram sansads (village councils), 112 mouzas and 106 inhabited villages. Kolaghat police station serves this block. Earlier, it was called Panskura II CD Block, but was renamed Kolaghat CD Block in 2011. Headquarters of this CD Block is at Kolaghat.

Gram panchayats of Kolaghat block/ panchayat samiti are: Amalhanda, Baisnabchak, Bhogpur, Brindabanchak, Deriachak, Gopal Nagar, Khanyadihi, Kola I, Kola II, Pulsita, Sagarbarh, Siddha I and Siddha II.

== Demographics ==
=== Population ===
As per 2011 Census of India Kolaghat CD Block had a total population of 290,124, of which 239,646 were rural and 50,478 were urban. There were 150,246 (52%) males and 139,878 (48%) females. Population below 6 years was 31,450. Scheduled Castes numbered 24,593 (8.48%) and Scheduled Tribes numbered 945 (0.33%).

As per 2001 census, Panskura II block had a total population of 256,875, out of which 132,042 were males and 124,833 were females. Panskura II block registered a population growth of 12.94 per cent during the 1991-2001 decade. Decadal growth for the combined Midnapore district was 14.87 per cent Decadal growth in West Bengal was 17.84 per cent.

Census Towns in Kolaghat CD Block (2011 census figures in brackets): Kolaghat (25,191), Amalhara (14,261), Mihitikri (6,906) and Kharisha (4,120).

Large villages (with 4,000+ population) in Kolaghat CD Block (2011 census figures in brackets): Brindaban Chak (10,235), Siddha (5,642), Paramanandapur (4,002), Narayan Pakuria (5,654), Saluka (5,680), Gopal Nagar (5,333), Rain (5,329), Arar (5,618), Raksa Chak (4,308), Mandar Gachha (4,204), Bhogpur (7,559) and Derya Chak (11,358).

Other villages in Kolaghat CD Block (2011 census figures in brackets): Mecheda (673).

=== Literacy ===
As per 2011 census the total number of literates in Kolaghat CD Block was 219,686 (84.93% of the population over 6 years) out of which 122,060 (56%) were males and 97,626 (44%) were females. As per 2011 census, literacy in Purba Medinipur district was 87.02%. Purba Medinipur had the highest literacy amongst all the districts of West Bengal in 2011.

See also – List of West Bengal districts ranked by literacy rate

Literacy in CD blocks of
Purba Medinipur district
Tamluk subdivision
Tamluk – 87.06%
Sahid Matangini – 86.99%
Panskura I – 83.65%
Panskura II – 84.93%
Nandakumar – 85.56%
Chandipur – 87.81%
Moyna – 86.33%
Haldia subdivision
Mahishadal – 86.21%
Nandigram I – 84.89%
Nandigram II – 89.16%
Sutahata – 85.42%
Haldia – 85.96%
Contai subdivision
Contai I – 89.32%
Contai II – 88.33%
Contai III – 89.88%
Khejuri I – 88.90%
Khejuri II – 85.37%
Ramnagar I – 87.84%
Ramnagar II – 89.38%
Bhagabanpur II – 90.98%
Egra subdivision
Bhagabanpur I – 88.13%
Egra I – 82.83%
Egra II – 86.47%
Patashpur I – 86.58%
Patashpur II – 86.50%
2011 Census: CD Block Wise

Primary Census Abstract Data

=== Language and religion ===
Religion in Kolaghat CD block (2011)
Hinduism	78.30%
Islam	21.50%
Other or not stated	0.20%

In 2011 census Hindus numbered 227,164 and formed 78.30% of the population in Kolaghat CD Block. Muslims numbered 62,369 and formed 21.50% of the population. Others numbered 591 and formed 0.20% of the population. In 2001, Hindus made up 79.65% and Muslims 20.18% of the population respectively.

Bengali is the predominant language, spoken by 99.26% of the population.

== Rural poverty ==
The District Human Development Report for Purba Medinipur has provided a CD Block-wise data table for Modified Human Poverty Index of the district. Kolaghat CD Block registered 18.72 on the MHPI scale. The CD Block-wise mean MHPI was estimated at 24.9. Eleven out of twentyfive CD Blocks were found to be severely deprived in respect of grand CD Block average value of MHPI (CD Blocks with lower amount of poverty are better): All the CD Blocks of Haldia and Contai subdivisions appeared backward, except Ramnagar I & II, of all the blocks of Egra subdivision only Bhagabanpur I appeared backward and in Tamluk subdivision none appeared backward.

== Economy ==
=== Kolaghat Thermal Power Station ===
Kolaghat Thermal Power Station is a coal-fired thermal power plant consisting of 6 units of 210 MW located at Mecheda. The units were synchronised between 1984 and 1993.

=== Livelihood ===
In Kolaghat CD Block in 2011, total workers formed 37.50% of the total population and amongst the class of total workers, cultivators formed 14.29%, agricultural labourers 20.19%, household industry workers 12.81% and other workers 52.71%.

=== Infrastructure ===
There are 106 inhabited villages in Kolaghat CD block. All 106 villages (100%) have power supply. All 106 villages (100%) have drinking water supply. 25 villages (23.58%) have post offices. 103 villages (97.17%) have telephones (including landlines, public call offices and mobile phones). 35 villages (33.02%) have a pucca (paved) approach road and 43 villages (40.57%) have transport communication (includes bus service, rail facility and navigable waterways). 22 villages (20.75%) have agricultural credit societies. 12 villages (11.32%) have banks.

In 2007-08, around 40% of rural households in the district had electricity.

In 2013-14, there were 68 fertiliser depots, 15 seed stores and 49 fair price shops in the CD Block.

=== Agriculture ===
Persons engaged in agriculture
in Kolaghat CD Block
1. Bargadars (2.69%)
2. Patta holders (3.02%)
3. Small farmers (2.45%)
4. Marginal farmers (43.5%)
5. Agricultural labourers (48.4%)

According to the District Human Development Report of Purba Medinipur: The agricultural sector is the lifeline of a predominantly rural economy. It is largely dependent on the Low Capacity Deep Tubewells (around 50%) or High Capacity Deep Tubewells (around 27%) for irrigation, as the district does not have a good network of canals, compared to some of the neighbouring districts. In many cases the canals are drainage canals which get the backflow of river water at times of high tide or the rainy season. The average size of land holding in Purba Medinipur, in 2005-06, was 0.73 hectares against 1.01 hectares in West Bengal.

In 2013-14, the total area irrigated in Kolaghat CD Block was 9,257 hectares, out of which 460 hectares were irrigated by canal water, 1,400 hectares by tank water, 1,130 hectares by deep tube wells, 110 hectares by shallow tube wells, 720 hectares by river lift irrigation and 5,437 hectares by other means.

Although the Bargadari Act of 1950 recognised the rights of bargadars to a higher share of crops from the land that they tilled, it was not implemented fully. Large tracts, beyond the prescribed limit of land ceiling, remained with the rich landlords. From 1977 onwards major land reforms took place in West Bengal. Land in excess of land ceiling was acquired and distributed amongst the peasants. Following land reforms land ownership pattern has undergone transformation. In 2013-14, persons engaged in agriculture in Kolaghat CD Block could be classified as follows: bargadars 2.69%, patta (document) holders 3.02%, small farmers (possessing land between 1 and 2 hectares) 2.45%, marginal farmers (possessing land up to 1 hectare) 43.46% and agricultural labourers 48.38%.

In 2013-14, Kolaghat CD Block produced 2,686 tonnes of Aman paddy, the main winter crop, from 3,186 hectares, 30,067 tonnes of Boro paddy, the spring crop, from 8,249 hectares, and 47 tonnes of potatoes from 2 hectares. It also produced oil seeds.

Betelvine is a major source of livelihood in Purba Medinipur district, particularly in Tamluk and Contai subdivisions. Betelvine production in 2008-09 was the highest amongst all the districts and was around a third of the total state production. In 2008-09, Purba Mednipur produced 2,789 tonnes of cashew nuts from 3,340 hectares of land.

=== Floriculture ===
West Bengal is the third largest producer of flower in the country. The two leading flower producing districts of West Bengal are Purba Medinipur and Nadia. Purba Medinipur leads in both cropped area and production, although floriculture in the district remains in its infancy. There is great potentiality of flower production particularly in three CD Blocks – Kolaghat, Panskura and Sahid Matangini.

In 2007-08 in Purba Medinipur district 31.750 crore spikes of rose were produced from 555 hectares, 4,880 tonnes of chrysanthemum were produced from 150 hectares, 4.140 crore spikes of gladiolus were produced from 250 hectares, 13.310 crore spikes of tube rose were produced from 451 hectares, 10,140 tonnes marigold were produced from 1,115 hectares, 370 tonnes of jasmine were produced from 280 hectares, and 1,645 tonnes of season flowers were produced from 1,255 hectares.

Concentration of Handicraft Activities in CD Blocks
- Horn Craft - Kolaghat
- Pata Chitra - Chandipur, Nandakumar
- Sea Shell – Ramnagar I & II
- Mat & Mat Diversified Products – Ramnagar I, Egra I & II, Patashpur I
- Brass & Bell Metal – Ramnagar I, Mahisadal, Patashpur II, Egra I
- Diversified Jute Products – Ramnagar II, Nandakumar, Kolaghat, Shahid Matangini
- Cane & Bamboo Products - Chandipur, Nandakumar, Kolaghat, Shahid Matangini
- Sola Craft - Tamluk, Kolaghat
- Pottery/Terracotta - Panskura, Tamluk, Sahid Matangini, Nandakumar
- Wood Craft - Tamluk
- Zari work - Sutahta, Mahisadal, Haldia, Nandakumar

Source: District Human Development Report, Purba Medinipur, Page 97

=== Pisciculture ===
Purba Medinipur's net district domestic product derives one fifth of its earnings from fisheries, the highest amongst all the districts of West Bengal. The nett area available for effective pisciculture in Kolaghat CD Block in 2013-14 was 766.69 hectares. 4,112 persons were engaged in the profession and approximate annual production was 29,211 quintals.

=== Banking ===
In 2013-14, Kolaghat CD Block had offices of 9 commercial banks and 4 gramin banks.

=== Backward Regions Grant Fund ===
Medinipur East district is listed as a backward region and receives financial support from the Backward Regions Grant Fund. The fund, created by the Government of India, is designed to redress regional imbalances in development. As of 2012, 272 districts across the country were listed under this scheme. The list includes 11 districts of West Bengal.

== Transport ==
Kolaghat CD Block has 8 ferry services and 8 originating/ terminating bus routes.

Kolaghat and Mecheda are stations on the Howrah-Kharagpur line. The Howrah-Kharagpur line was constructed in 1900. The Howrah–Kharagpur line was electrified in 1967-69.

The Dankuni-Kharagpur sector of NH 16 passes through this block.

== Education ==
In 2013-14, Kolaghat CD Block had 153 primary schools with 13,948 students, 13 middle schools with 873 students, 7 high schools with 5,206 students and 21 higher secondary schools with 31,035 students. Kolaghat CD Block had 1 general college with 102 students, 1 professional/ technical institution with 1,493 students, 387 institutions for special and non-formal education with 12,038 students.

As per the 2011 census, in Kolaghat CD block, amongst the 106 inhabited villages, 3 villages did not have a school, 55 villages had two or more primary schools, 32 villages had at least 1 primary and 1 middle school and 20 villages had at least 1 middle and 1 secondary school.

College of Engineering and Management, Kolaghat, was established in 1998, in the township of Kolaghat Thermal Power Station. It is affiliated with Maulana Abul Kalam Azad University of Technology.

Rabindra Bharati Mahavidyalaya was established at Kolaghat in 2010. It is affiliated with Vidyasagar University.

== Healthcare ==
In 2014, Kolaghat CD Block had 1 block primary health centre, 2 primary health centres, and 9 private nursing homes with total 145 beds and 7 doctors (excluding private bodies). It had 39 family welfare sub centres. 2,603 patients were treated indoor and 171,990 patients were treated outdoor in the hospitals, health centres and subcentres of the CD Block.

Paikpari Rural Hospital at Paikpari, PO Kolaghat Notun Bazar (with 30 beds) is the main medical facility in Kolaghat CD block. There are primary health centres at Machinan, PO Rain Gopalnagar (with 6 beds) and Nandaigajan, PO Bhogpur (with 10 beds).
