= Shyamsundarpur Patna =

Shyamsundarpur Patna Shyamsundarpur
- Village
- Location in West Bengal, India Shyamsundarpur Patna (India)
- Coordinates: 22.4683°N 87.6874°E
- Country: India
- State: West Bengal
- District: Purba Medinipur

Population (2011)
  - Total: 3,259

Languages
  - Official: Bengali, English
- Time zone: UTC+5:30 (IST)
- PIN: 721139
- Lok Sabha constituency: Ghatal
- Vidhan Sabha constituency: Panskura Paschim
- Website: purbamedinipur.gov.in

Shyamsundarpur Patna (also known as Shyamsundarpur) is a village in Panskura CD block in Tamluk subdivision of Purba Medinipur district in the state of West Bengal, India.

== Geography ==
Cities and towns in Tamluk subdivision of Purba Medinipur district
M: municipal city/ town, CT: census town, R: rural/ urban centre, H: historical/ religious centre
Owing to space constraints in the small map, the actual locations in a larger map may vary slightly

=== Location ===
Shyamsundarpur is located at 22.4683°N 87.6874°E.

=== Urbanisation ===
94.08% of the population of Tamluk subdivision live in the rural areas. Only 5.92% of the population live in the urban areas, and that is the second lowest proportion of urban population amongst the four subdivisions in Purba Medinipur district, just above Egra subdivision.

Note: The map alongside presents some of the notable locations in the subdivision. All places marked in the map are linked in the larger full screen map.

== Demographics ==
As per 2011 Census of India Shyamsundarpur had a total population of 3,259 of which 1,714 (53%) were males and 1,545 (47%) were females. Population below 6 years was 175. The total number of literates in Shyamsundarpur was 2,381 (77.20% of the population over 6 years).

== Education ==
Siddhinath Mahavidyalaya, a government degree college, was established at Shyamsundarpur Patna in 2013. Affiliated with the Vidyasagar University, it offers honours courses in Bengali, English, Sanskrit, history, education, philosophy, mathematics and geography, and general courses in arts and science.
