= Sahid Matangini (community development block) =

- Community development block
- Coordinates: 22.4085810°N 87.9128190°E
- Country: India
- State: West Bengal
- District: Purba Medinipur

Government
  - Type: Community development block

Area
  - Total: 97.82 km^{2} (37.77 sq mi)

Population (2011)
  - Total: 199,210
  - Density: 2,036/km^{2} (5,274/sq mi)

Languages
  - Official: Bengali, English
- Time zone: UTC+5:30 (IST)
- Area code: 03228
- ISO 3166 code: IN-WB
- Vehicle registration: WB-29, WB-30, WB-31, WB-32, WB-33
- Literacy: 86.99%
- Lok Sabha constituency: Tamluk
- Vidhan Sabha constituency: Tamluk
- Website: purbamedinipur.gov.in

Sahid Matangini is a community development block that forms an administrative division in Tamluk subdivision of Purba Medinipur district in the Indian state of West Bengal.

== Etymology ==
The block is named after Matangini Hazra, an independence activist. She was born in Hogla village in what is now Sahid Matangini block, in 1869. She was shot dead by the police in front of Tamluk Police Station on 29 September 1942.

== Geography ==
Purba Medinipur district is part of the lower Indo-Gangetic Plain and Eastern coastal plains. Topographically, the district can be divided into two parts – (a) almost entirely flat plains on the west, east and north, (b) the coastal plains on the south. The vast expanse of land is formed of alluvium and is composed of younger and coastal alluvial. The elevation of the district is within 10 metres above mean sea level. The district has a long coastline of 65.5 km along its southern and south eastern boundary. Five coastal CD Blocks, namely, Khejuri II, Contai II (Deshapran), Contai I, Ramnagar I and II, are occasionally affected by cyclones and tornadoes. Tidal floods are quite regular in these five CD Blocks. Normally floods occur in 21 of the 25 CD Blocks in the district. The major rivers are Haldi, Rupnarayan, Rasulpur, Bagui and Keleghai, flowing in north to south or south-east direction. River water is an important source of irrigation. The district has a low 899 hectare forest cover, which is 0.02% of its geographical area.

Kharui, a constituent panchayat of Sahid Matangini block, is located at 22°24′31″N 87°54′46″E.

Sahid Matangini CD Block is bounded by Kolaghat CD Block in the north, Bagnan II and Shyampur II CD Blocks, in Howrah district, across the Rupnarayan, in the east, Tamluk CD Block in the south and Kolaghat and Tamluk CD Blocks in the west.

It is located 12 km from Tamluk, the district headquarters.

Sahid Matangini CD Block has an area of 97.82 km^{2}. It has 1 panchayat samity, 10 gram panchayats, 152 gram sansads (village councils), 87 mouzas and 81 inhabited villages. Kolaghat police station serves this block. Headquarters of this CD Block is at Chatara.

Gram panchayats of Sahid Matangini block/ panchayat samiti are: Balluk I, Balluk II, Dhalpara, Kakharda, Kharui I, Kharui II, Raghunathpur I, Raghunathpur II, Santipur I and Santipur II.

== Demographics ==
=== Population ===
As per 2011 Census of India Sahid Matangini CD Block had a total population of 199,210, of which 183,987 were rural and 15,223 were urban. There were 103,144 (52%) males and 96,066 (48%) females. Population below 6 years was 22,061. Scheduled Castes numbered 11,239 (5.64%) and Scheduled Tribes numbered 246 (0.12%).

As per 2001 census, Sahid Matangini block had a total population of 176,219, out of which 90,888 were males and 85,331 were females. Sahid Matangini block registered a population growth of 13.87 per cent during the 1991-2001 decade. Decadal growth for the combined Midnapore district was 14.87 per cent. Decadal growth in West Bengal was 17.84 per cent.

Census Towns in Sahid Matangini CD Block (2011 census figures in brackets): Kakdihi (5,477) and Shantipur (9,746).

Large villages (with 4,000+ population) in Sahid Matangini CD Block (2011 census figures in brackets): Baragechhe (4,981), Chatara (4,868), Kharui (7,343), Gathra (4,348), Saira (4,122), Alinan (4,339), Balarampur (4,350), Janu Basan (5,363), Mahisda (4,279) and Uttar Dhalhara (7,150).

Other villages in Sahid Matangini CD Block (2011 census figures in brackets): Ballok (3,565), Kakharda (2,930) and Raghunathpur (2,079).

=== Literacy ===
As per 2011 census the total number of literates in Sahid Matangini CD Block was 154,093 (86.99% of the population over 6 years) out of which 85,093 (55%) were males and 69,000 (45%) were females. As per 2011 census, literacy in Purba Medinipur district was 87.02%. Purba Medinipur had the highest literacy amongst all the districts of West Bengal in 2011.

See also – List of West Bengal districts ranked by literacy rate

Literacy in CD blocks of
Purba Medinipur district
Tamluk subdivision
Tamluk – 87.06%
Sahid Matangini – 86.99%
Panskura I – 83.65%
Panskura II – 84.93%
Nandakumar – 85.56%
Chandipur – 87.81%
Moyna – 86.33%
Haldia subdivision
Mahishadal – 86.21%
Nandigram I – 84.89%
Nandigram II – 89.16%
Sutahata – 85.42%
Haldia – 85.96%
Contai subdivision
Contai I – 89.32%
Contai II – 88.33%
Contai III – 89.88%
Khejuri I – 88.90%
Khejuri II – 85.37%
Ramnagar I – 87.84%
Ramnagar II – 89.38%
Bhagabanpur II – 90.98%
Egra subdivision
Bhagabanpur I – 88.13%
Egra I – 82.83%
Egra II – 86.47%
Patashpur I – 86.58%
Patashpur II – 86.50%
2011 Census: CD Block Wise

Primary Census Abstract Data

=== Language and religion ===
Religion in Sahid Mantangini CD block (2011)
Hinduism	84.66%
Islam	15.25%
Other or not stated	0.09%

In 2011 census Hindus numbered 168,642 and formed 84.66% of the population in Sahid Matangini CD Block. Muslims numbered 30,390 and formed 15.25% of the population. Others numbered 178 and formed 0.09% of the population. In 2001, Hindus made up 86.00% and Muslims 13.94% of the population respectively.

Bengali is the predominant language, spoken by 99.76% of the population.

== Rural poverty ==
The District Human Development Report for Purba Medinipur has provided a CD Block-wise data table for Modified Human Poverty Index of the district. Sahid Matangini CD Block registered 23.77 on the MHPI scale. The CD Block-wise mean MHPI was estimated at 24.9. Eleven out of twentyfive CD Blocks were found to be severely deprived in respect of grand CD Block average value of MHPI (CD Blocks with lower amount of poverty are better): All the CD Blocks of Haldia and Contai subdivisions appeared backward, except Ramnagar I & II, of all the blocks of Egra subdivision only Bhagabanpur I appeared backward and in Tamluk subdivision none appeared backward.

== Economy ==
=== Livelihood ===
In Sahid Matangini CD Block in 2011, total workers formed 36.52% of the total population and amongst the class of total workers, cultivators formed 12.21%, agricultural labourers 25.52%, household industry workers 8.67% and other workers 53.60%.

=== Infrastructure ===
There are 81 inhabited villages in Sahid Matangini CD block. All 81 villages (100%) have power supply. All 81 villages (100%) have drinking water supply. 14 villages (17.28%) have post offices. 69 villages (85.19%) have telephones (including landlines, public call offices and mobile phones). 18 villages (22.22%) have a pucca (paved) approach road and 33 villages (43.74%) have transport communication (includes bus service, rail facility and navigable waterways). 15 villages (18.52%) have agricultural credit societies. 6 villages (7.41%) have banks.

In 2007–08, around 40% of rural households in the district had electricity.

In 2013–14, there were 31 fertiliser depots, 9 seed stores and 39 fair price shops in the CD Block.

=== Agriculture ===
Persons engaged in agriculture
in Sahid Matangini CD Block
1. Bargadars (1.86%)
2. Patta holders (6.96%)
3. Small farmers (2.26%)
4. Marginal farmers (37.0%)
5. Agricultural labourers (51.9%)

According to the District Human Development Report of Purba Medinipur: The agricultural sector is the lifeline of a predominantly rural economy. It is largely dependent on the Low Capacity Deep Tubewells (around 50%) or High Capacity Deep Tubewells (around 27%) for irrigation, as the district does not have a good network of canals, compared to some of the neighbouring districts. In many cases the canals are drainage canals which get the backflow of river water at times of high tide or the rainy season. The average size of land holding in Purba Medinipur, in 2005–06, was 0.73 hectares against 1.01 hectares in West Bengal.

In 2013–14, the total area irrigated in Sahid Matangini CD Block was 5,315 hectares, out 695 hectares were irrigated by tank water, 120 hectares by river lift irrigation and 4,500 hectares by other means.

Although the Bargadari Act of 1950 recognised the rights of bargadars to a higher share of crops from the land that they tilled, it was not implemented fully. Large tracts, beyond the prescribed limit of land ceiling, remained with the rich landlords. From 1977 onwards major land reforms took place in West Bengal. Land in excess of land ceiling was acquired and distributed amongst the peasants. Following land reforms land ownership pattern has undergone transformation. In 2013–14, persons engaged in agriculture in Sahid Matangini CD Block could be classified as follows: bargadars 1.86%, patta (document) holders 6.96%, small farmers (possessing land between 1 and 2 hectares) 2.26%, marginal farmers (possessing land up to 1 hectare) 37.01% and agricultural labourers 51.91%.

In 2013–14, Sahid Matangini CD Block produced 1,876 tonnes of Aman paddy, the main winter crop, from 2,385 hectares, 17,325 tonnes of Boro paddy, the spring crop, from 4,826 hectares, 13 tonnes of wheat from 5 hectares and 3,363 tonnes of potatoes from 102 hectares. It also produced pulses and oil seeds.

Betelvine is a major source of livelihood in Purba Medinipur district, particularly in Tamluk and Contai subdivisions. Betelvine production in 2008-09 was the highest amongst all the districts and was around a third of the total state production. In 2008–09, Purba Mednipur produced 2,789 tonnes of cashew nuts from 3,340 hectares of land.

=== Floriculture ===
West Bengal is the third largest producer of flower in the country. The two leading flower producing districts of West Bengal are Purba Medinipur and Nadia. Purba Medinipur leads in both cropped area and production, although floriculture in the district remains in its infancy. There is great potentiality of flower production particularly in three CD Blocks – Kolaghat, Panskura and Sahid Matangini.

In 2007–08 in Purba Medinipur district 31.750 crore spikes of rose were produced from 555 hectares, 4,880 tonnes of chrysanthemum were produced from 150 hectares, 4.140 crore spikes of gladiolus were produced from 250 hectares, 13.310 crore spikes of tube rose were produced from 451 hectares, 10,140 tonnes marigold were produced from 1,115 hectares, 370 tonnes of jasmine were produced from 280 hectares, and 1,645 tonnes of season flowers were produced from 1,255 hectares.

Concentration of Handicraft Activities in CD Blocks
- Horn Craft - Kolaghat
- Pata Chitra - Chandipur, Nandakumar
- Sea Shell – Ramnagar I & II
- Mat & Mat Diversified Products – Ramnagar I, Egra I & II, Patashpur I
- Brass & Bell Metal – Ramnagar I, Mahisadal, Patashpur II, Egra I
- Diversified Jute Products – Ramnagar II, Nandakumar, Kolaghat, Shahid Matangini
- Cane & Bamboo Products - Chandipur, Nandakumar, Kolaghat, Shahid Matangini
- Sola Craft - Tamluk, Kolaghat
- Pottery/Terracotta - Panskura, Tamluk, Sahid Matangini, Nandakumar
- Wood Craft - Tamluk
- Zari work - Sutahta, Mahisadal, Haldia, Nandakumar

Source: District Human Development Report, Purba Medinipur, Page 97

=== Pisciculture ===
Purba Medinipur's net district domestic product derives one fifth of its earnings from fisheries, the highest amongst all the districts of West Bengal. The nett area available for effective pisciculture in Sahid Matangini CD Block in 2013-14 was 510.30 hectares. 2,860 persons were engaged in the profession and approximate annual production was 19,442 quintals.

=== Banking ===
In 2013–14, Sahid Matangini CD Block had offices of 9 commercial banks and 2 gramin banks.

=== Backward Regions Grant Fund ===
Medinipur East district is listed as a backward region and receives financial support from the Backward Regions Grant Fund. The fund, created by the Government of India, is designed to redress regional imbalances in development. As of 2012, 272 districts across the country were listed under this scheme. The list includes 11 districts of West Bengal.

== Transport ==
Sahid Matangini is a station on the Panskura-Haldia line. The line was constructed in 1968 and was electrified in 1974–76.

NH 116, from Kolaghat to Haldia, passes through this block.

== Education ==
In 2013–14, Sahid Matangini CD Block had 112 primary schools with 8,513 students, 14 middle schools with 1,776 students, 9 high schools with 3,490 students and 14 higher secondary schools with 16,454 students. Sahid Matangini CD Block had 285 institutions for special and non-formal education with 12,339 students.

As per the 2011 census, in Sahid Matangini CD block, amongst the 81 inhabited villages, 5 villages did not have a school, 36 villages had two or more primary schools, 30 villages had at least 1 primary and 1 middle school and 21 villages had at least 1 middle and 1 secondary school.

== Healthcare ==
In 2014, Sahid Matangini CD Block had 1 block primary health centre, 2 primary health centres, and 8 private nursing homes with total 115 beds and 8 doctors (excluding private bodies). It had 31 family welfare sub centres. 2,780 patients were treated indoor and 129,042 patients were treated outdoor in the hospitals, health centres and subcentres of the CD Block.

H.S. Janubasan Rural Hospital at Janu Basan, PO Norakuri Bazar (with 30 beds) is the main medical facility in Sahid Matangini CD block. There are primary health centres at Ramchandrapur (with 10 beds) and Uttar Dhalhara, PO Dhalhara (with 2 beds).

== Notable people ==
- Khan Bahadur Alfazuddin Ahmed, MLA of Midnapore
