= Kolaghat Thermal Power Station =

Coal-fired power station in West Bengal, India

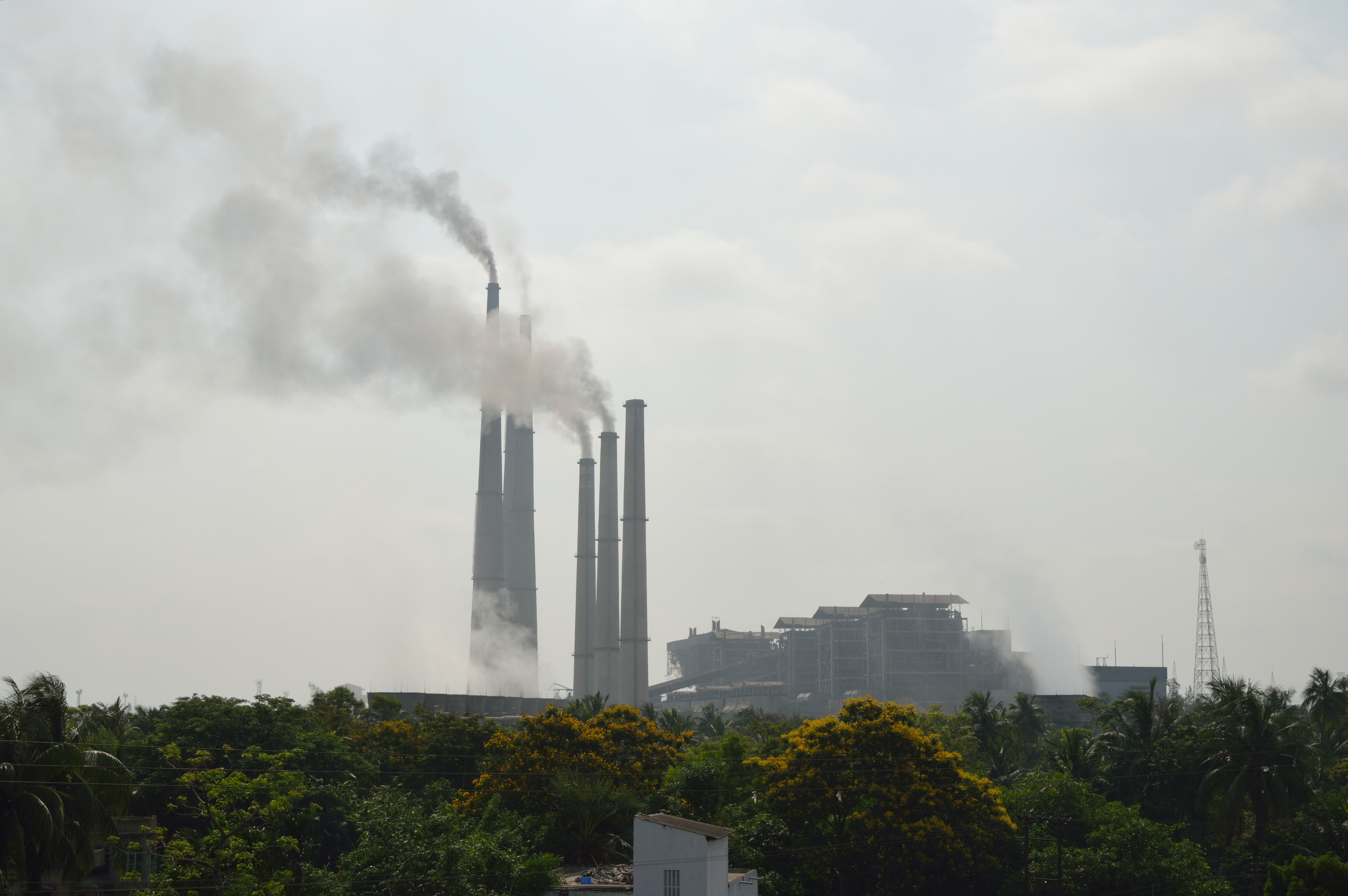
- Country: India
- Location: Mecheda, Medinipur, West Bengal
- Coordinates: 22°24′56″N 87°52′12″E
- Status: Operational
- Commission date: 1984
- Operator: West Bengal Power Development Corporation Limited

Thermal power station
- Primary fuel: Coal

Power generation
- Units operational: 4 X 210 MW
- Make and model: BHEL; Siemens
- Nameplate capacity: 1.26 GW

External links
- Commons: Related media on Commons

Kolaghat Thermal Power Station is a major thermal power station in West Bengal. It is located at Mecheda, approx. 55 km from Kolkata in the Purba Medinipur district. The power plant is operated by West Bengal Power Development Corporation Limited (WBPDCL)

The power plant has four units of 210 MW, each for a total capacity of 840 MW. The units were commissioned in two stages during the period of 1984 to 1995.

== Installed capacity ==
Following is the unit wise capacity of the plant.

Stage	Unit Number	Installed Capacity (MW)	Date of Commissioning	Status
I	1	210	September 1990	Demolished
I	2	210	March 1986	Demolished
I	3	210	October 1984	Operational
II	4	210	April 1995	Operational
II	5	210	May 1991	Operational
II	6	210	January 1994	Operational

== Demolition ==
In a significant move to address long-standing pollution concerns, two chimneys at the Kolaghat Thermal Power Station were demolished on April 13, 2025. The controlled implosions marked a pivotal step in the plant's environmental mitigation efforts, though the future operational status of remaining units remains unclear at this stage.

== See also ==
- Kolaghat
- Bakreshwar Thermal Power Station
- Santaldih Thermal Power Station
