= Kolaghat =

Census town of West Bengal, India

- Census Town
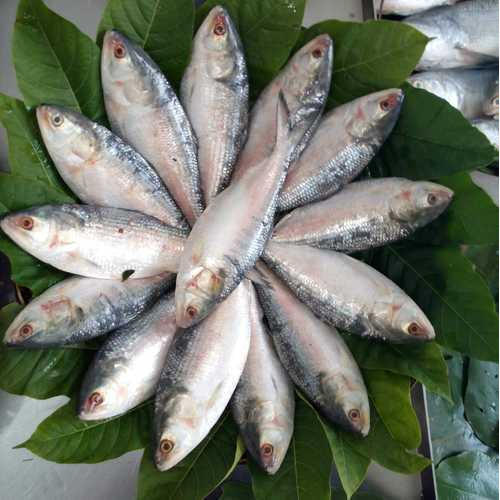
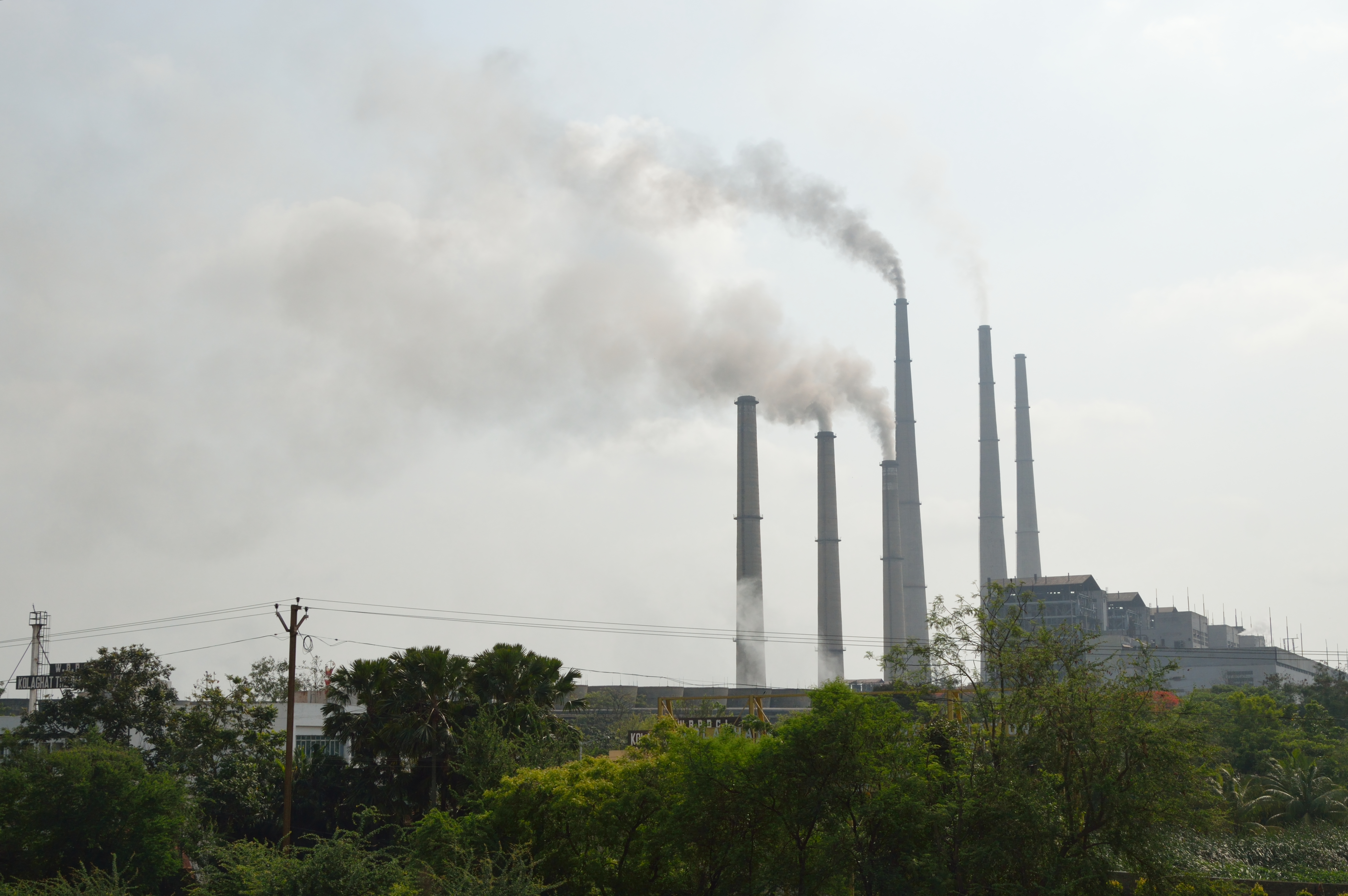
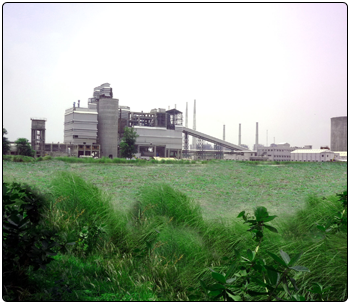
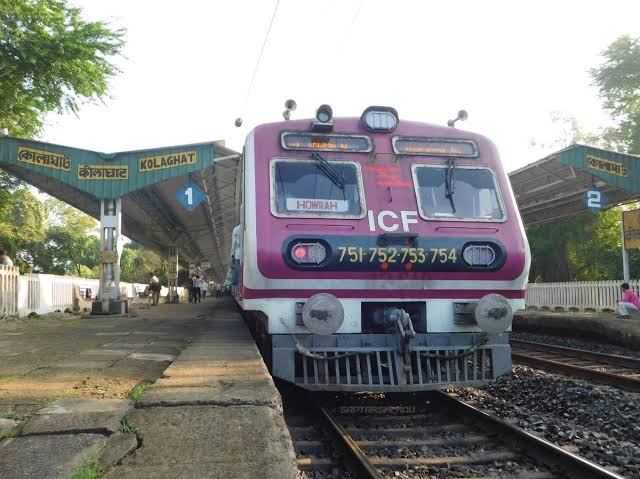
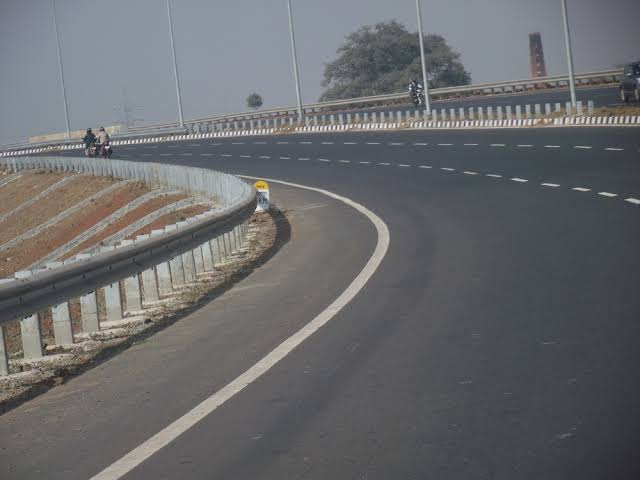
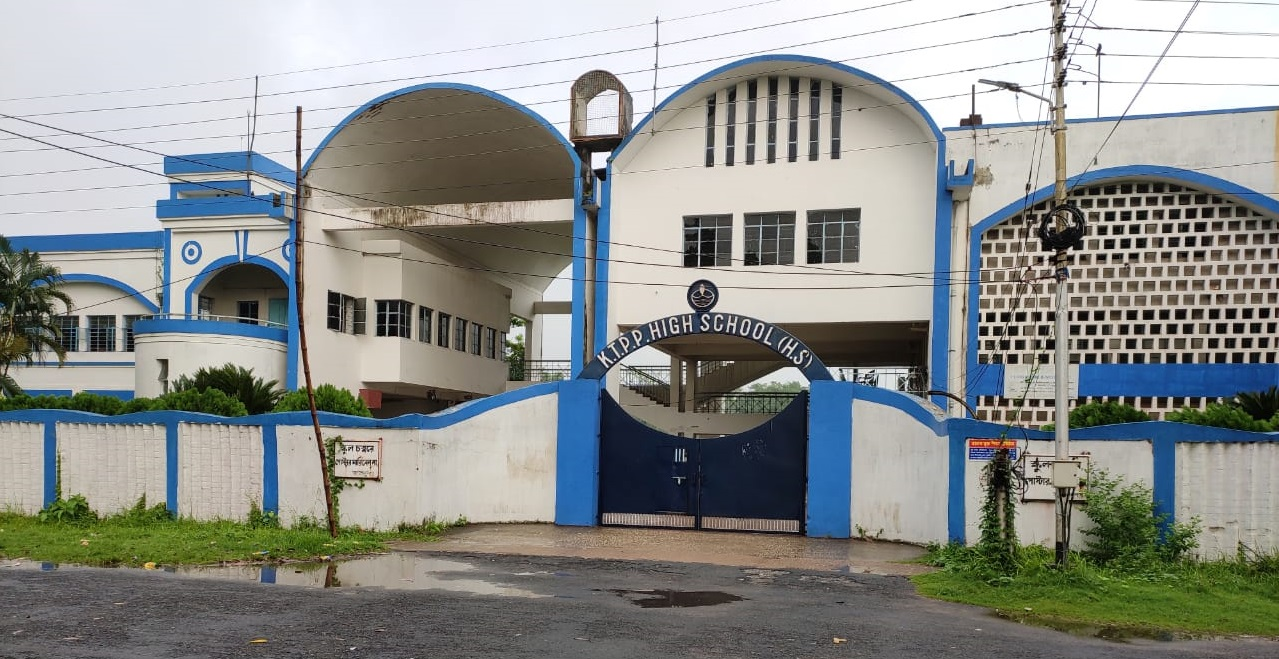
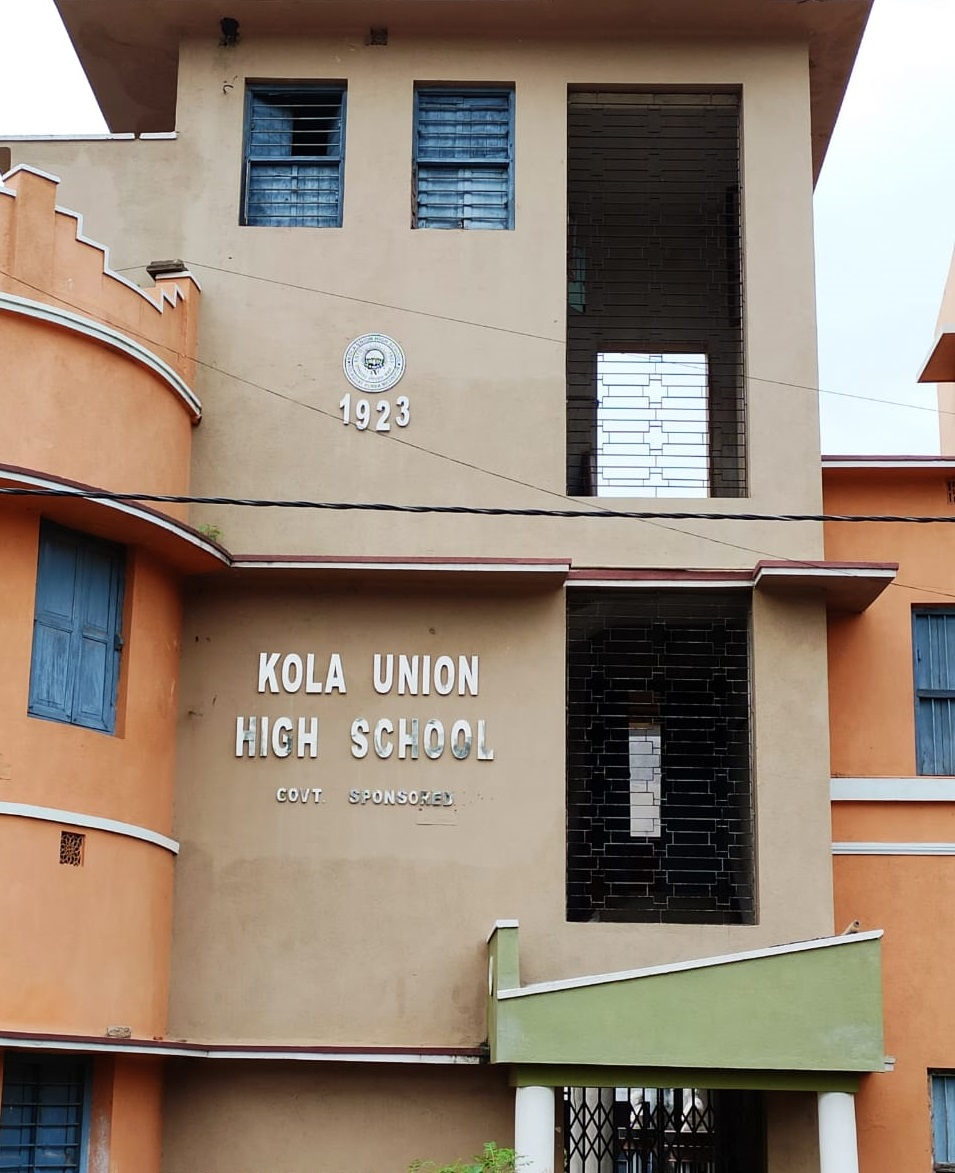
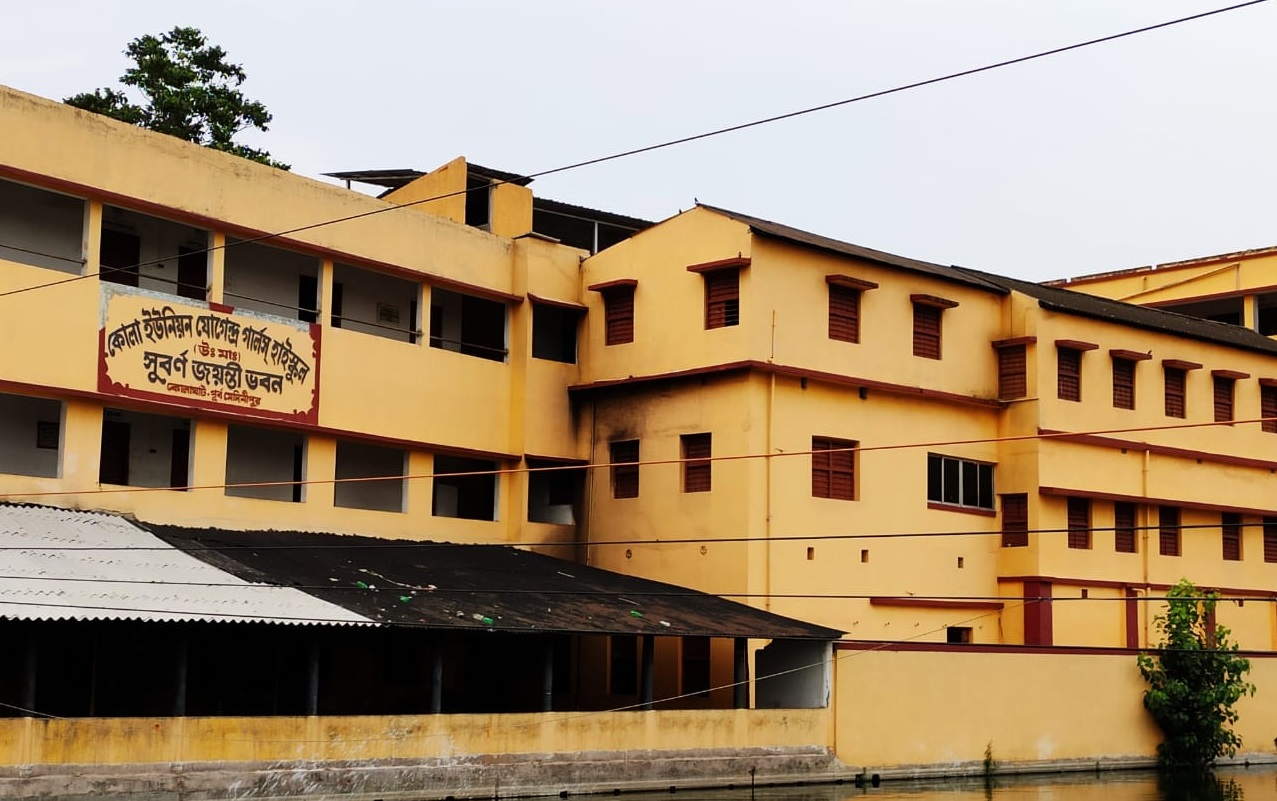
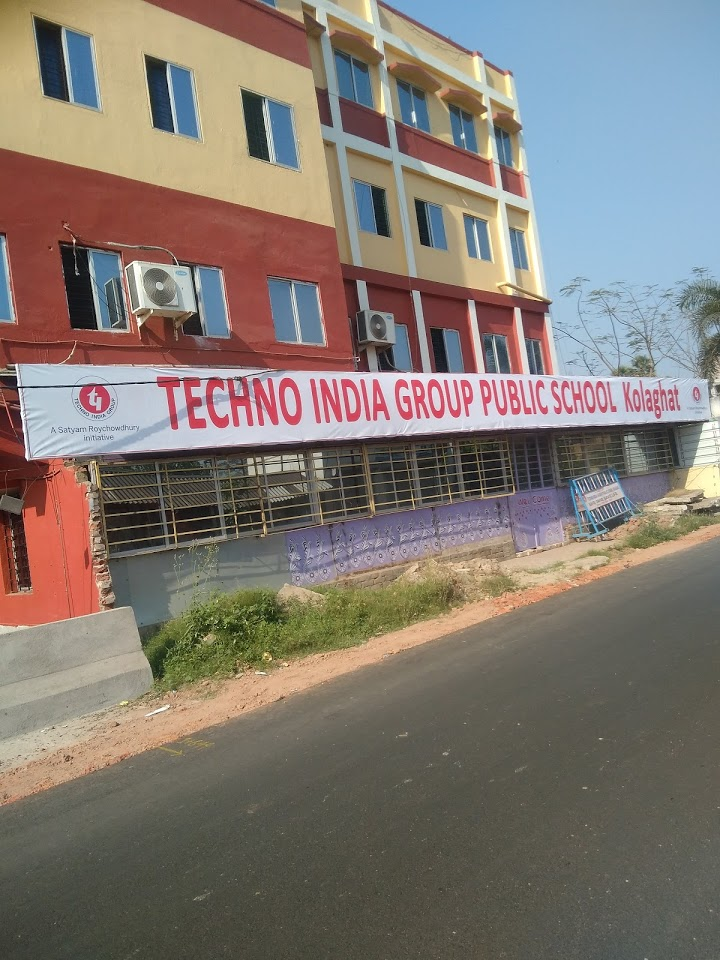
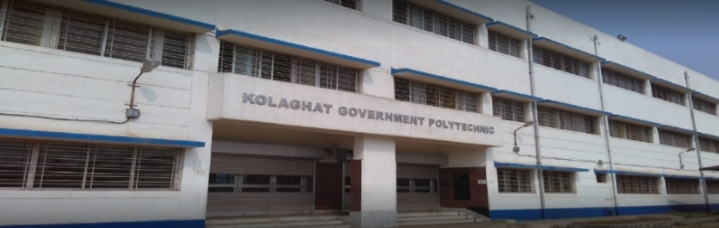
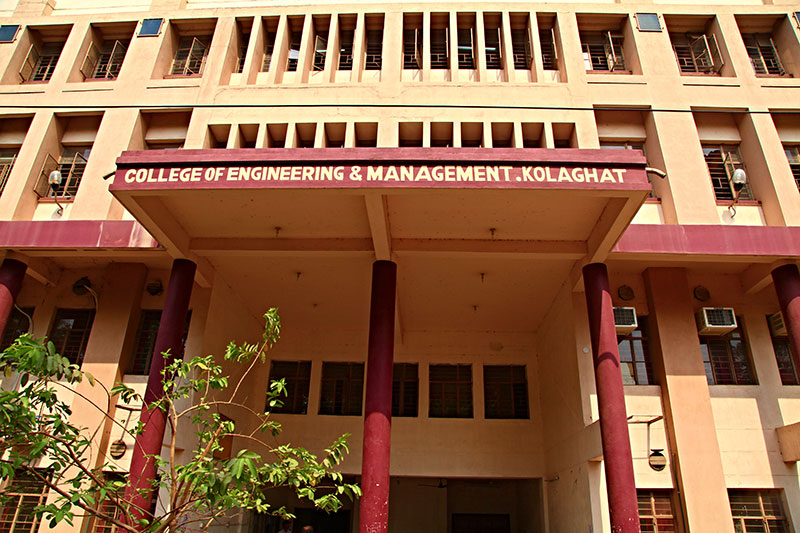

- Kolaghat(West Bengal) Kolaghat (India)
- Coordinates: 22.43°N 87.87°E
- Country: India
- State: West Bengal
- District: Purba Medinipur
- Subdivision: Tamluk
- CD block: Kolaghat

Area
  - Total: 6.07 km^{2} (2.34 sq mi)
  - Rank: 5th
- Elevation: 9 m (30 ft)

Population (2011)
  - Total: 25,191
  - Density: 4,150/km^{2} (10,700/sq mi)

Languages
  - Official: Bengali, English
- Time zone: UTC+5:30 (IST)
- PIN: 721134 (Kolaghat)
- ISO 3166 code: IN-WB
- Vehicle registration: WB-29, WB-30,
- Lok Sabha constituency: Tamluk
- Vidhan Sabha constituency: Panskura Purba
- Avg. summer temperature: 50 °C (122 °F)
- Avg. winter temperature: 19 °C (66 °F)
- Website: purbamedinipur.gov.in

Kolaghat is a census town in Kolaghat CD Block, Tamluk subdivision of the Purba Medinipur district in the state of West Bengal, India.

== Geography ==
Cities and towns in Tamluk subdivision of Purba Medinipur district
M: municipal city/ town, CT: census town, R: rural/ urban centre, H: historical/ religious centre
Owing to space constraints in the small map, the actual locations in a larger map may vary slightly

=== Location ===
Kolaghat is located at 22.43°N 87.87°E. It is located in the Panskura–II community development block of the Tamluk subdivision.

=== Police station ===
Kolaghat police station, situated inside Kolaghat Thermal Power Station has jurisdiction over Kolaghat and Sahid Matangini CD Blocks.

=== Urbanisation ===
94.08% of the population of Tamluk subdivision live in the rural areas. Only 5.92% of the population live in the urban areas, and that is the second lowest proportion of urban population amongst the four subdivisions in Purba Medinipur district, just above Egra subdivision. Note: The map alongside presents some of the notable locations in the subdivision. All places marked in the map are linked in the larger full screen map.

== Infrastructure ==
As per the District Census Handbook 2011, Kolaghat covered an area of 6.07 km^{2}. It had the facility of a railway station and bus route. Amongst the medical facilities it had a hospital 4 km away, a nursing home 2 km away, 2 dispensaries/ health centres and 3 medicine shops. Amongst the educational facilities It had were 12 primary schools, 2 middle schools, 2 secondary schools and 2 senior secondary schools. Amongst the recreational and cultural facilities it had were a stadium, a cinema theatre at Mecheda 5 km away, an auditorium/ community hall, a public library and a reading room in the town.

== Demographics ==
As per 2011 Census of India Kolaghat had a total population of 25,191 of which 12,890 (51%) were males and 12,301 (49%) were females. Population below 6 years was 2,349. The total number of literates in Kolaghat was 19,909 (87.16% of the population over 6 years).As of 2001 India census, Kolaghat had a population of 23707. Males constitute 51% of the population and females 49%. Kolaghat has an average literacy rate of 71%, higher than the national average of 59.5%: male literacy is 78%, and female literacy is 64%. In Kolaghat, 11% of the population is under 6 years of age.

== Civic administration and utility services ==
Kolaghat Census Town looks after civic affairs in the town. There is a proposal to upgrade it to a Municipality after including the railway area under its jurisdiction. As of now responsibility of civic amenities in railway area lies with the Divisional Railway Master, South Eastern Rly. Division who is also the head of railway establishment in Kolaghat. State-owned Bharat Sanchar Nigam Limited, or BSNL, as well as private enterprises, among them Vodafone-idea(Vi), Airtel, Jio and are the leading telephone, cell phone and internet service providers in the city.

== Economy and industry ==
- West Bengal Power Development Corporation Limited (WBPDCL) of West Bengal Government runs the 6 X 210 MW Thermal Power Station at Kolaghat (Kolaghat thermal power station or K.T.P.S. ). It is the largest in the state sector.
- Ramco Cements has one grinding unit in Kolaghat, which commenced production in 2010.
- The Rupnarayan River is in this region several brick production units are located on the banks of this river.
- Kolaghat flower market is one of the biggest flower market in West Bengal. It is located near Railway platform no.1

The riverside has become a popular picnic spot and is often crowded with people, particularly during the Christmas and New Year holidays. The town is notable for its Hilsa fish.

== Post Office ==
- India Post(DOP).

== The Railway Station ==
=== South Eastern Railway Zone ===
One of the key features of Kolaghat is its railway station. It is by far the busiest railway station in South Eastern Railway Zone within West Bengal due to its connectivity to other major places:5 of Platforms:3.

== Transport ==
Kolaghat is well connected by road through NH-116 and NH-6 (namely Bombay road). It is 54.4 km from Kolkata and 60.45 km from Kharagpur. The Kolaghat Bridge (Namely Sarat Setu) is the only which connects the South India.

== Education ==
=== Colleges ===
- Maulana Abul Kalam Azad University of Technology Government Group & Pvt Group Company Sponsorship Graduate Engineering College,Kolaghat
- Vidyasagar University Graduation College, Kolaghat

== Notable people ==
- Mani Lal Bhaumik
- Biplab Roy Chowdhury

== Healthcare ==
Paikpari Rural Hospital at Paikpari, PO Kolaghat (with 30 beds) is the main medical facility in Kolaghat. A few private nursing homes and clinics are spread across all over Kolaghat. Many renowned doctors visit several clinics on a regular basis. There are primary health centres at Machinan, PO Gopalnagar (with 6 beds) & Nandaigajan, PO Bhogpur (with 10 beds).

== Culture ==
Places of worship include Kolaghat Jain Temple, Shiva Temple, Shitala Temple in Old Bazar, Mosque, Gopalnagar Vrindavan Temple, Kanak Durga Temple, Rain Kalindakunj Temple, Jagannath Temple, Jashar Panchananda Shiva Temple. Some of the festivals celebrated here are Id-Ul Fitar, Kartik Puja, Saraswati Puja, Shab-e-Barat, Milad un Nabi, Kali Puja, Muharram, Barah Wafat and others. A number of books ("Kolaghat Sanket" in Bengali), Rupnarayan and Kolaghat festival are being held here.
