= Alfazuddin Ahmed =

Bengali politician

Khan Bahadur Alfazuddin Ahmed

Member of the Bengal Legislative Assembly
- In office 1937–1945
- Succeeded by: Serajuddin Ahmad
- Constituency: Midnapore

Personal details
- Born: Dhalhara, Midnapore district, Bengal Presidency

Alfazuddin Ahmed was a Bengali politician.

== Early life and education ==
Ahmed was born into a Bengali Muslim family in the village of Dhalhara in the Midnapore district of the Bengal Presidency. He holds a Master of Arts degree.

== Career ==
Ahmed contested in the 1937 Bengal Legislative Assembly election and won a seat at the Bengal Legislative Assembly. He was a member of the Primary Education Curriculum Committee and the Sub-Committee for English Studies. Ahmed was a member of the Reception Committee of the Third Session of the Indian History Congress on behalf of the University of Calcutta.
