= Mecheda =

- Town
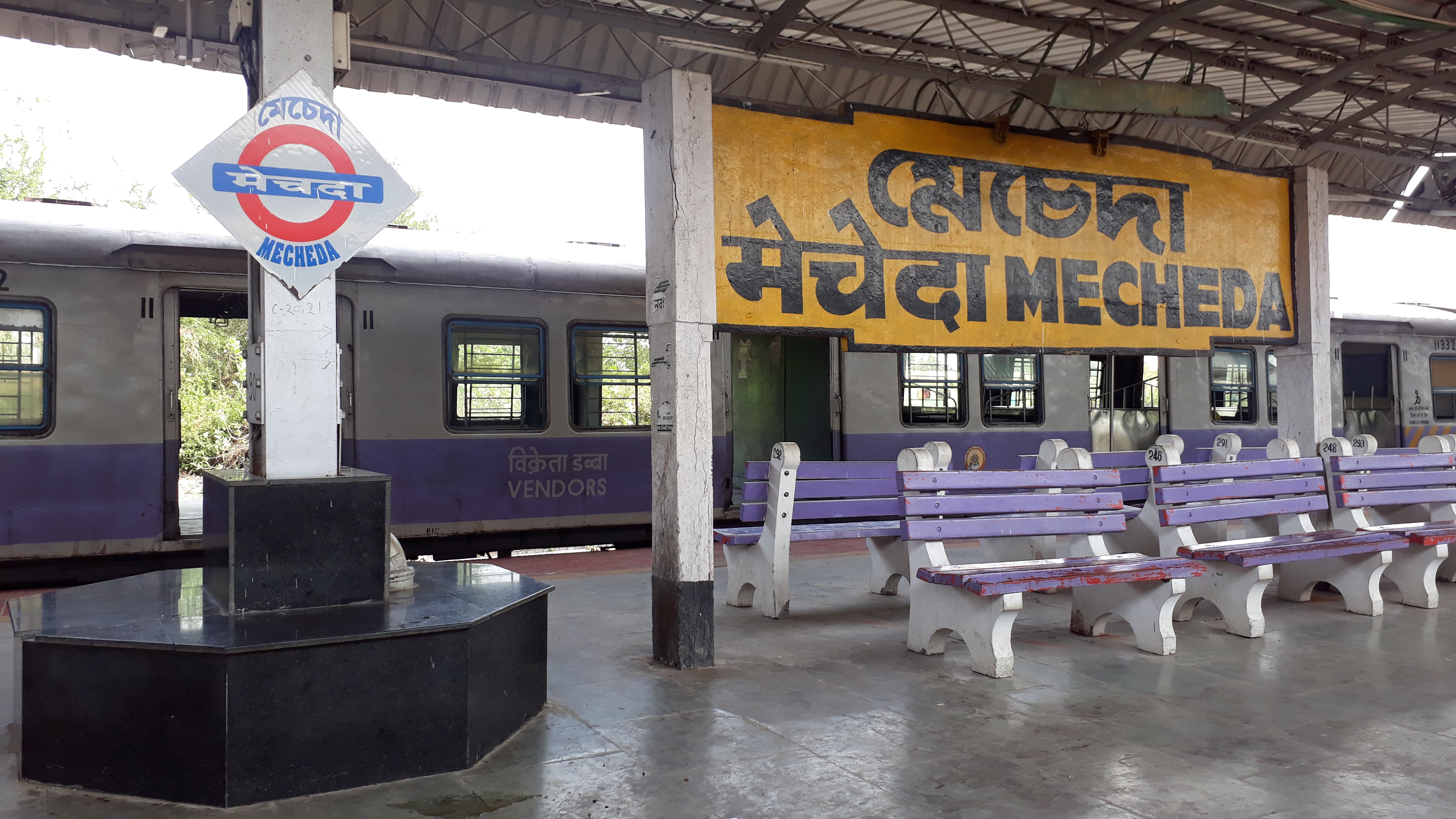
- Mecheda railway station

- Location in West Bengal, India Mecheda (India)
- Coordinates: 22.40499°N 87.8525162°E
- Country: India
- State: West Bengal
- District: Purba Medinipur

Government
  - Body: Nagar Palika

Languages
  - Official: Bengali, English
- Time zone: UTC+5:30 (IST)
- PIN: 721137
- Telephone/STD code: 03228
- Vehicle registration: WB-29 & WB-30
- Website: purbamedinipur.gov.in

Mecheda is a town in Kolaghat community development block in West Bengal, India. The town is the entrance point of Purba Medinipur district which lies upon the South Eastern Railway Zone and in proximity to Haldia, Tamluk, Digha and Contai, Egra.

== Weather ==
Summers are hot, but the winters are mild with the mercury hardly going below 11 °C. During the winter, weather is relatively warmer than other places in Purba Medinipur.

== Cuisine ==
Mecheda is famous for its own popular Mechedar vegetable Chop and potatoes chop.

== Communication ==
Mecheda is the gateway of Purba Medinipur district. NH 41, Kalaikunda air force base about 100 km from Mecheda. Mecheda Railway station is well-connected by connected by South Eastern railway. There is a central bus stand connected by roads. Mecheda acts as a junction point for travellers who are going to Haldia Port. It's also the junction point of Digha.

== Education ==
Mecheda has a number of schools, it has a semi-government engineering college, the College of Engineering and Management, Kolaghat. The college was conceived and planned by Professor Shankar Sen, an educationist and a former vice chancellor of Jadavpur University, in 1998.
