= Emperor vs Sarat Chandra =

2026 Bengali film by Srijit Mukherji

- Official poster released on 21 April 2026
- Directed by: Srijit Mukherji
- Screenplay by: Srijit Mukherji
- Story by: Sarat Chandra Chattopadhyay
- Based on: Pather Dabi by Sarat Chandra Chattopadhyay
- Produced by: Pradip Kumar Nandy
- Starring: Abir Chatterjee; Mimi Chakraborty; Tota Roy Chowdhury
- Narrated by: Tota Roy Chowdhury
- Cinematography: Indranath Marick
- Edited by: Srijit Mukherji; Debojyoti Ghosh
- Music by: Srijit Mukherji (soundtrack); Indraadip Dasgupta (background score)
- Production company: Nandy Movies
- Distributed by: PVR Inox Pictures
- Release date: 15 October 2026
- Running time: 135 minutes
- Country: India
- Language: Bengali
- Box office: ₹1.19 crore

Emperor vs Sarat Chandra is a 2026 Bengali-language epic historical drama film (Note: The given genres are: drama, historical and political.) written and directed by Srijit Mukherji, who also makes his debut as a film music album composer in the film. Produced by Pradip Kumar Nandy under the banner of Nandy Movies, it was initially scheduled for release on May 1, 2026, it was released in October, 2026, on the occasion of Durga Puja. It is based on Pather Dabi, a 1926 novel (novella) written by Sarat Chandra Chattopadhyay, the subsequent ban on the book and a correspondence between Chattopadhyay and Rabindranath Tagore. A 59-second teaser of the film was released on June 3, 2026 by its makers.

On its first announcement, Dag Creative Media and Shree Venkatesh Films were its producers. The cast given by Mukherjee was Sohini Sarkar, Abir Chatterjee, Tota Roy Chowdhury and Rudranil Ghosh in lead roles. By new rules implemented by the film committee (IMPFA-Federation), Media and SVF dropped out, by having conflicting release dates of their films. Pradip Kumar Nandy, owner of Nandy Movies, became the producer and production house. Mimi Chakraborty replaced Sarkar by Nandy Movies and Buddhadev Das replaced Ghosh with prior discussion between Mukherji and Ghosh. Start of the shooting was delayed from November to January.

Released on October 15, 2026 during the Durga Puja festivals in West Bengal, Emperor vs Sarat Chandra primarily follows two main characters, Sabyasachi Mallick (Abir Chatterjee), a revolutionary and fighter whose ambition for independence frequently results in run-ins with the British; and Sarat Chandra Chattopadhyay (Tota Roy Chowdhury), a novelist and writer yearning independence by writing books and novels, mainly focusing on his novel Pather Dabi, besides a brief history of his other novels. With a nonlinear storytelling, the film frequently switches between the two characters. The film received praise for several aspects including cinematography, makeup, cast performances, editing and music, but was criticized for using AI in some scenes.

== Premise ==
Pather Dabi was published by Sarat Chandra Chattopadhyay in August 1926, centering the British Raj as its story. In January 1927, the novel was banned by the British colonial government for its revolutionary theme and for openly challenging the government. Within a week, it sold out all its available copies. In 1938, Chattopadhyay died of liver cancer. The next year in 1939, the ban was lifted by the government.

== Cast ==
- Abir Chatterjee as Sabyasachi Mallick
- Tota Roy Choudhury as Sarat Chandra Chattopadhyay
- Richard Bhakti Klein as Charles Tegart
- Sanjoy Nag as Rabindranath Tagore (voiced by Joy Goswami)
- Mimi Chakraborty as Sumitra
- Buddhadev Das
- Rik Chattopadhyay as Apurbo
- Divyani Mondal as Bharati
- Loknath Dey as Deshbandhu Chittaranjan Das
- Kanchan Mallick as Nimai Roy
- Koushani Mukherjee as Chandramukhi (cameo appearance)
- Kalpan Mitra as Devdas (cameo appearance)
- Debopriyo Mukherjee as Iyer
- Tathagata Mukherjee as Brajendra

== Soundtrack ==
The film's music is composed by Srijit Mukherji, which is his first time as a music director for a film. The soundtrack of the film are put to music by him according to his own imagination. The background music for the film was made by the composer Indraadip Dasgupta. There are four songs set in Emperor vs Sarat Chandra, one written by Mukherji, one written by Srijato and the other two songs' lyricists are Rabindranath Tagore. Mukherji had composed a few songs before, but his compositional work in this film marked his first time composing a full-length album. He worked with the music team to achieve his full songwriting.

On October 15, Mukherji, Rik Chattopadhyay and Divyani Mondal collaborated with independent Bengali musician Indra for shooting a music video ahead of the film release. A residence named Badan Chand Roy Bari was chosen as the location for the music video shooting; the house belonging to Supratim Roy, who is part of the film's cast.

The song "Shoite Shoite" is the first track from the film, which marked Mukherji's debut as a composer. It was written and composed by him, with vocals given by Timir Biswas. Singer-songwriter Anupam Roy and other musicians launched the track in early October 2026. Mukherji was reported to have composed the song "Ador" from the film Abhhiman, released in June 2026. According to The Telegraph, "Shoite Shoite" reflects the turbulent atmosphere of Bengali during British rule, promoting revolution and resistance. Statements were made about the song by Anupam Roy and Mukherji.

The second song "Tomarei Koriyachi" was originally written and composed by Tagore, with Mukherji composing the music for it for use in the film. It was sung by singers Mohan Singh Khangura, Ishan Mitra and Antaraa Bhataacharya. As described by the Indian Express, Mukherji composed the song in his own musical way while keeping the depth and emotion of the original composition by Tagore. The song featured scenes of Tagore in its play in the film. It was released on YouTube on September 17.

The third track, titled "Dil Ke Daag" was described as a song set in the old world of zamindars (landlords), representing wealth and oppressions performed by the British. The song plays during a scene in which Chandramukhi, played by actor Koushani Mukherjee appears as a cameo character. It reflects the poignant world of Sarat Chandra Chattopadhyay's characters, pairing the legacy of his characters with a modern cinematic vision, according to Piya Roy. It is written by Srijato and composed by Mukherji. It was launched on September 27 in the Shobhabazar Rajbari, a historic royal fort located in Kolkata, which Mukherji accompanied.

Track listing
No.	Title	Lyrics	Singer(s)	Length
1.	"Shoite Shoite"	Srijit Mukherji	Timir Biswas, Sutirtha Chakraborty	5:36
2.	"Tomarei Koriyachi" (Originally composed by Rabindranath Tagore)	Rabindranath Tagore	Mohan Singh Khangura, Ishan Mitra, Antaraa Bhataacharya	4:54
3.	"Dil Ke Daag"	Srijato Bandyopadhyay	Shreya Ghoshal	4:23
4.	"Shawrbo Khawrbotaare"	Tagore	Srijit Mukherji; Tilak Dasgupta; Saptarshi; Rajarshi; Sutirtha Chakraborty; Sayati; Doyel; Nagorik; Sharmishtha; Shakuntala	3:28

== Production ==
=== Pre-production ===
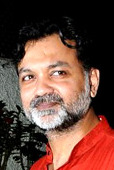
Srijit Mukherji is the director and song composer of the film.

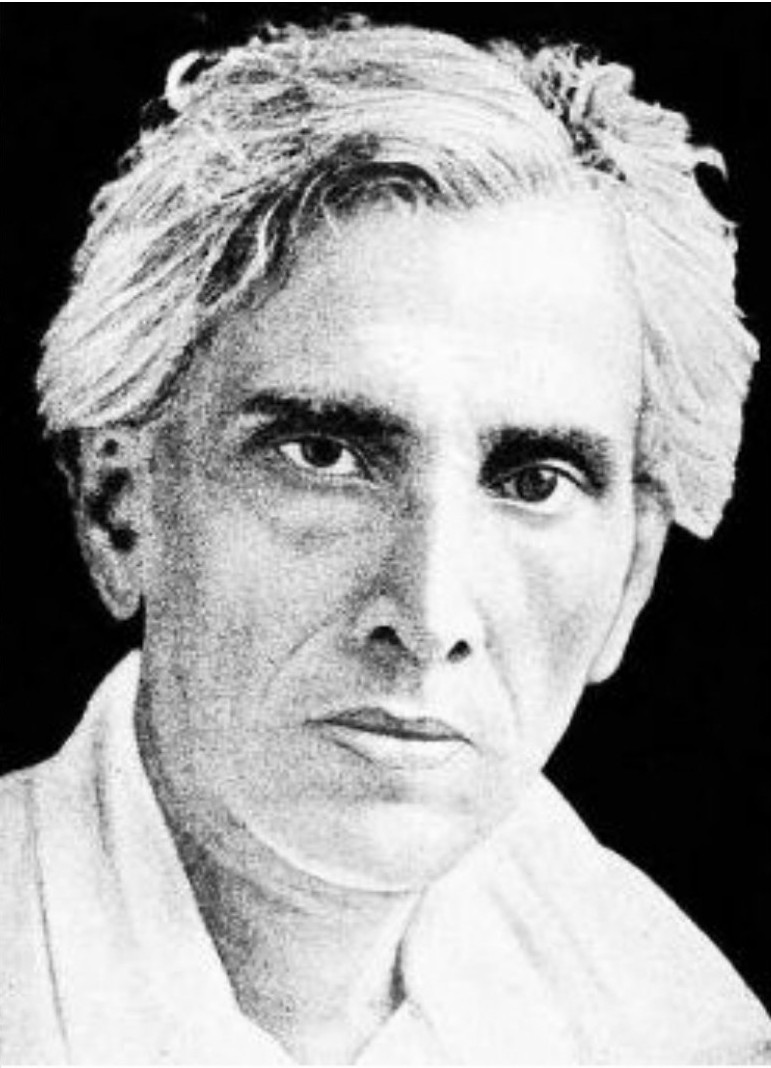
The film is based on the work of Sarat Chandra Chattopadhyay.

Srijit Mukherjee announced the film by posting on Twitter on the morning of 31 August 2025. He stated the film to be a period drama set in 1926, the pre-Indian independence era. He said the title of the film to be inspired from the British Indian court case about the bombing in Alipore, Emperor v. Aurobindo Ghosh. Mukherji said the production to originally begin from November 2025. Among the appearances from the period depicted, Rabindranath Thakur and Deshbandhu Chittaranjan Das were to appear. Mukherji stated the cast to appear in the film, on 17 September; he did not reveal the roles of the actors in the first few days. With its declaration as a period film, Emperor vs Sarat Chandra was considered by many sources to be a possible black and white film. Mukherji remarked that no they took no final decision regarding the color at that time. However, it was later decided that the film would be in usual color and would have not be set in black and white.

Upon the first announcement of the film, Srijit Mukherji said that Tota Roychowdhury, Abir Chatterjee and Sohini Sarkar would be playing the lead roles, with the production houses Dag Creative Media and Shree Venkatesh Films. With effect on the Tollywood film industry, IMPFA-Federation gave out new rules that a production house will not be able to release two films at the same to avoid conflicting the release dates of films by production houses. Production companies Dag Creative Media and Shree Venkatesh Films had a release date of May for their other separate films. In November 2025, Nandy Movies replaced Dag Creative Media as the production house. Shree Venkatesh Films left the project for their role of producing the film. Mukherji commented in a podcast that he got the idea for the movie by reading real letters between Tagore and Chattopadhyay. It was initially said that the film shooting would be done in Kolkata, with shooting scenes that would be done in Rangoon (Yangon, Myanmar).

The new film poster with Nandy Movies was released on 27 November 2025. Pather Dabi was adapted as a film in 1977, called Sabyasachi, starring Uttam Kumar. During the announcement of Emperor vs Sarat Chandra, Mukhherji's upcoming film Lawho Gouranger Naam Re was being shot, scheduled for release during Christmas. With a new release set for Durga Puja 2026, Emperor vs Sarat Chandra was said to show the evolution of Chattopadhyay from writing his greatest works such as Parineeta and Devdas besides the plot of Pather Dabi. It was also said to include resistance of Sarat Chandra against the ban, his appeal to Rabindranath Tagore and societal debates. In response to a query why Mukherji picked Sarat Chandra to other writers, remarked "At that time, not only in Bengal, Sarat Chandra Chattopadhyay was the most popular writer in whole of India. He managed to reach every house of Bengal. Famous dramas, pictures, movies are being adapted from his works, and his novels are being translated into English and published under Oxford University Press. Even by sitting at the peak of his popularity and success, the way he had the bravery to still oppose the British Empire and build resistance against it is very inspiring." Apart from directing Emperor vs Sarat Chandra, Mukherji handled the screenplay, dialogues, editing, music and lyrics among other creative aspects of it.

=== Development ===
A teaser for the film lasting 59-seconds was released on June 3, 2026, a Wednesday. In the teaser, Abir Chatterjee was revealed to be playing the role of Sabyasachi Mallick, protagonist of the novel and a revolutionary. He appeared in the teaser dressed in a white shirt, coat, and a hat, holding pistols in both hands, suggesting ambidexterity. Tota Roy Chowdhury makes an appearance in the film as Sarat Chandra Chattopadhyay, shown sitting at a desk in a rainy atmosphere, wearing a traditional dhoti and punjabi.

Before Mukherji started making significant changes to the screenplay of the film, he re-read Pather Dabi for properly positioning Sabyasachi's career and Chattopadhyay's works and to structure the screenplay. While shooting the film, Mukherji said that he faced no difficulties when working with actors Abir Chatterjee or Tota Chowdhury. In his early life, Mukherji learned singing, and how to play harmonium, tabla and Hawaiian guitar. His father was a student of Sudhin Dasgupta and his mother a student of Kalyani Roy. He played with bands and performed songs at various times throughout his life, also hearing songs from his aunt Arati Mukherjee. In both of Mukherji's singing and composing songs for Emperor vs Sarat Chandra, he drew inspiration from many musicians, namely, Shankar Mahadevan, Shreya Ghoshal, Arijit Singh, Kabir Suman, Debojyoti Mishra, Anupam Roy and Indraadip Dasgupta.

On September 2, another teaser for it was issued. Serving as a cinematic tribute to Chattopadhyay, it emphasized him and also his novel. Piya Roy writing for t2ONLINE stated: "The visuals are full of a vintage aura that adds credibility to the action. Generating deep historical nostalgia with its muted, sepia-toned gradients, it also establishes a serious and contemplative mood wherein literary creation mirrors real political turmoil." The teaser depicted Chowdhury as Chattopadhyay, and Chatterjee and Mimi Chakraborty.

In October, the filmmakers announced that Rabindranath Tagore in the film, played by Sanjoy Nag is voiced by poet Joy Goswami. This collaboration was previously portrayed in the 2013 documentary Jeevan Smriti, directed by Rituparno Ghosh, in which Nag also portrayed Tagore, with Goswami giving the voice. Nag told Mukherji after the first day of shooting that if he did not provide his voice for the filming, Joy Goswami would dub him, which Mukherji agreed to. Earlier in Jeevan Smriti, he had Goswami dub over his character of Tagore, which Nag regarded to require a slightly older voice. After he cast himself as Tagore on the first day, Nag wanted Goswami to dub over his character, after seeing the age of Tagore he was depicting, after which he contacted Goswami.

=== Casting ===
Nandy Movies implemented a change in the film cast. Mimi Chakraborty replaced Sohini Sarkar. After a discussion with Mukherji and Rudranil Ghosh, they agreed to have Buddhadev Das replace Ghosh, who Mukherji remarked fit the subject's look more. Rik Chattopadhyay replaced Satyam Bhattacharya. Bhattacharya acted in the shooting of Vijaynagar'er Hirey. Pre-production work was started in November 2025. Mukherji changed the film's shooting to start from January 2026. He stated to be four total songs in the film, with two of them being Rabindra Sangeet, one song being written by Srijit Mukherji and another song by Srijato. Emperor vs Sarat Chandra has an ensemble cast.

This film is especially close to my heart as it
marks my debut as a music composer.

— Srijit Mukherji

In 2025, Srijit Mukherji released the films Shotyi Bole Shotyi Kichhu Nei and Killbill Society. In accordance with particular styles and relations associated with his films, he commented "Nothing of the kind is happening. I am basically making a film about the period of writing of Pather Daabi, the Bengali of that time, the events and personalities." He stated the film to be an "examination of ideology and resistance against oppression." He is to appear as a composer for all of the songs in the film. He announced the film celebrating the 100th anniversary of Sarat Chandra Chattopadhyay's novel Pather Dabi. As of 11 January, the shooting had started. According to ETV Bharat, Abir Chatterjee is playing the role of Sabyasachi. He commented on the shooting, "I think this is a very important film. Because it talks about history and the people it talks about are not only our predecessors, they are also legends. [...] I will tell the rest when the shooting is over." Tota Roy Choudhury is playing the role of Sarat Chandra Chattopadhyay. The other roles by the human cast actors are confirmed and all the specific roles were given by the time of release. By September 22, Koushani Mukherjee was disclosed to be part of the cast, playing the role of Chandramukhi, a character created by Chattopadhyay in his another novel Devdas, in a cameo appearance. Actor Kalpan Mitra was announced around the same time to play the role of Devdas, the protagonist of the same novel, also in a special cameo appearance. Devdas as a character was portrayed in earlier films by varied actors.

Divyani Mondal said about the film after her role had been confirmed, "I cannot express this feeling in words. This is a great debt to me. This is my first time working in the big cinema industry with Srijit sir. The actors I am going to work with are also such talented artists. This is a dream fulfillment to me." Mondal did not reveal her role in the film. Mondal, while at the October 1 trailer launch event, took a selfie with the film team, with Rik Chattopadhyay and Mukherji sitting beside her. A crowd was created around them, which the Bagnan police station struggled to handle. Nandy Movies made a post about the event on social platform Instagram. She got around 20 days to prepare for her role, in which she read the script, fit her appearance and set her workshop. In between the 20 days, Christmas and holiday seasons fell, from which Mondal took out time and prepared for portraying Bharati in the film.

Before getting his role for the film, Abir Chatterjee had read Pather Dabi before. He did not read it again after he got the role in it. He followed Mukherji for acting the role of Sabyasachi, who was previously portrayed by actor Uttam Kumar in a 1977 film based on the same novel. He considered the film's importance to be made from the roots and its history. He credited Bengali freedom fighters to have influenced the character model of Sabyasachi and viewed Chattopadhyay to have special importance in the freedom.

"I didn't feel the pressure. Not at this point in my career. I don't feel pressured anymore. I enjoy the process. However, playing someone who was a living character is tricky in today's times. I had to be responsible and pay attention to every nuance."

— Tota Roy Chowdhury

While speaking about the background and story behind his film, Mukherji commented that one day after the subject of the film had been finalized, he called Tota Roy Chowdhury. After Chowdhury picked up his phone, Mukherji said to him that his appearance looked a lot like Sarat Chandra. Chowdhury was surprised to hear this. Mukherji said to Chowdhury that he would be the storyteller in his film. Makeup artist Somnath Kundu applied a transformation to Chowdhury to have him resemble Sarat Chandra. Mukherji stated he first considered Anirban Bhattacharya in his thoughts for Chattopadhyay's role, but later selected Chowdhury after looking at many pictures of Chattopadhyay from various angles and of different ages. According to Sanjali Brahma writing for t2ONLINE, playing the role of Chattopadhyay involved Chowdhury having to lose weight, diverting from his regular exercise and altering his posture. He studied biographies of Chattopadhyay and works written by him to understand his character, as no audio recordings of him existed. He stated about his role: "I first saw my full look during dubbing. But the reaction I got from people really touched me. To say it's an understatement, I'm grateful. Seeing so much praise under the teaser, it seemed that Bengalis still appreciate good work." After Emperor vs Sarat Chandra was released, Chowdhury said that we was "dumbfounded" once Mukherji presented him the role and he asked whether he was sure, after which Chowdhury was confident in doing it when the final look was revealed. He considered playing Chattopadhyay's role as tricky, adding that he had to pay attention to his actions in the filming. He suggested Emperor vs Sarat Chandra to younger generations, calling it a slice of their heritage.

The main cast included actors Abir Chatterjee, Tota Roychowdhury and Mimi Chakraborty in the lead roles, actors Divyani Mondal, Rik Chatterjee, Debapriya Mukherjee, and later announced Sanjoy Nag, Koushani Mukherjee and Kanchan Mallick. Later, Debopriyo Mukherjee said during a visit to Sarat Chandra Kuthi that he would be playing the role of a revolutionary and rebel inside the film, named Iyer. The filmmakers confirmed his said role in the film. He earlier acted in the TV show Netaji and in following movies and shows as police officers. According to him, he faced a different experience in it, which required emotion and strategy. The director Srijit Mukherji made his debut as a music composer in the film by composing the songs in it. The background music is composed by Indraadip Dasgupta. The cinematographer was Indranath Marick, who captured the period and environment depicted in the film with the cameras. Somnath Kundu was the makeup artist, who was considered to have played a pivotal role in the film by his makeup, presenting the characters in their respective places and the historical timeline. Other than Chattopadhyay, other contemporary personalities like Rabindranath Tagore and Deshbandhu Chittaranjan Das shown were portrayed by various actors.

=== Post-production ===
Srijit Mukherji remarked that "Shoite Shoite", a song which he wrote and composed, manifesting his debut as a lyricist and composer, is the "musical spine of the film", capturing the journey of Chattopadhyay and Sabyasachi. He said that he felt the song as a liberating experience because he could both write and compose a song for the first time rather than a verbal brief he gave previously in his films. The song was released in a grand theater in Kolkata (Tollywood), in which Mukherji along with Chatterjee, Chowdhury and Mondal were present. Mukherji in a conversation said that Emperor vs Sarat Chandra is part of a political trilogy complete with SBSKN and Padatik. Adding that, of the three, it is more in the world of Rajkahini (stories about royalty) and he would place it in the same ranking as Jaatiswar and Lawho Gouranger Naam Rey, two of his earlier released films.

Abir Chatterjee said that playing the character of Sabyasachi was an opportunity for him to channel real-life revolutionaries who inspired his character, saying "the character carries impressions of Raj Behari Bose [sic], Netaji Subhas Chandra Bose, Masterda Surya Sen and Dr Jadugopal Mukherjee". Tota Roy Chowdhury said he was amazed and in disbelief when presented with the role of Chattopadhyay. Chowdhury remarked that after Mukherji presented him Chattopadhyay's role, he was not convinced on being able to do "such a difficult and complex character". He looked at the script by Mukherji and the performances he had to do, after which he became convinced and played his role.

On October 1 and 2, Chatterjee and Chowdhury talked about Emperor vs Sarat Chandra in an interview with Indulge Express. Mimi Chakraborty played the role of Sumitra, related to Sabyasachi. According to her, she liked opportunity of getting the role of Sumitra as she was largely unfamiliar with the character concept. In the book, Sumitra started off as a smuggler, transitioning into a patriot on the guidance and exposure to Sabyasachi. After which they both become dedicated for achieving independence. Actor Koushani Mukherjee portrayed the character Chandramukhi in a cameo appearance, saying "Chandramukhi is not just a character you play and leave behind [...] There is grace, strength, vulnerability and a certain mystery around her. I wanted to understand all those shades rather than simply play her as a performer." Her previous film Bohurupi: The Golden Daku was released on October 15, clashing with Emperor vs Sarat Chandra.

Although Chandramukhi does not appear in the Pather Dabi book and is instead a character of Chattopadhyay's novel Devdas. In the film, she is shown sitting on an ornate carpet under a lamp, wearing traditional jewelery and a green outfit. This appearance is a cameo. The addition of Mukherjee in the cast was not revealed by Srijit Mukherji in the usual prior movie announcements. Her role was announced on September 20, a few months after the main characters and cast were confirmed. Mukherjee's role was the second collaboration with Srijit Mukherji after Killbill Society. According to The Times of India and Millennium Post, Mukherjee's character adds a distinct literary emotion and new dimension to the film's plot about Sarat Chandra's career.

On October 1, 2026, a trailer for it was released, which highlighted clashes between British imperialists and Bengali rebels, showing the struggle for the release of Pather Dabi, suggesting a nostalgic and high-action drama drama. This trailer, along with previous promotional content, depicted that the film would run on two narrative paths– one that showed Sabyasachi in his revolutionary career, and one that showed Sarat Chandra Chattopadhyay's advancements with Pather Dabi and other works. The trailer starred Abir Chatterjee and Tota Roy Chowdhury in lead roles, with a length of two minutes and thirty one seconds. It featured Mimi Chakraborty, Rik Chatterjee and Divyani Mondal. One of the clips in it showed Chattopadhyay seeking advice Rabindranath Tagore. It showed chronicles of the history of Pather Dabi and later suggested showings of novels Devdas and Parineeta in it.

Sarat Chandra Kuthi, where part of the film's shooting was done, and later, a trailer show held

The trailer was also shown in Sarat Chandra Kuthi, the primary residence of Chattopadhyay, by the filmmakers before the October 1 teaser was formally released. Some parts of the film were also shot in it and some scenes featured the house inside the film. It featured the main cast, including Chatterjee, Chowdhury, Divyani Mondal and others. Part of the film's music crew like Soumen Chakraborty was also present in it. Mukherji and the actors sat inside the residential house in which Chattopadhyay lived, having the furniture that he kept from his time. Chowdhury said that he promised his children that he would but them many books authored by Chattopadhyay, but never imagined he would get to play his role. Mukherji, Chatterjee and Chakraborty also talked about it. Many people from local areas came to see them, in which the police interfered.

The film's release marked 100 years since Pather Dabi was published in 1926, with the British government banning it for violating the then 124A of the Indian Penal Code. Two years later, Chattopadhyay appealed to Tagore for guidance regarding the book's ban, which Tagore turned down, by sending a reply letter to him dated January 4, 1927.

In a brief interview, Srijit Mukherji described Pather Dabi as a nationalist book and said that it would not be banned if released today. He also said that directing a period courtroom battle is harder for him rather than writing and composing a song. Regarding the main characters of the film, Mukherji described Abir Chatterjee's role as "iconic" and Chattopadhyay's role played by Chowdhury as "unbelievable". He considered Chauri Chaura to be most difficult real-life incident to recreate on the set.

== Themes ==
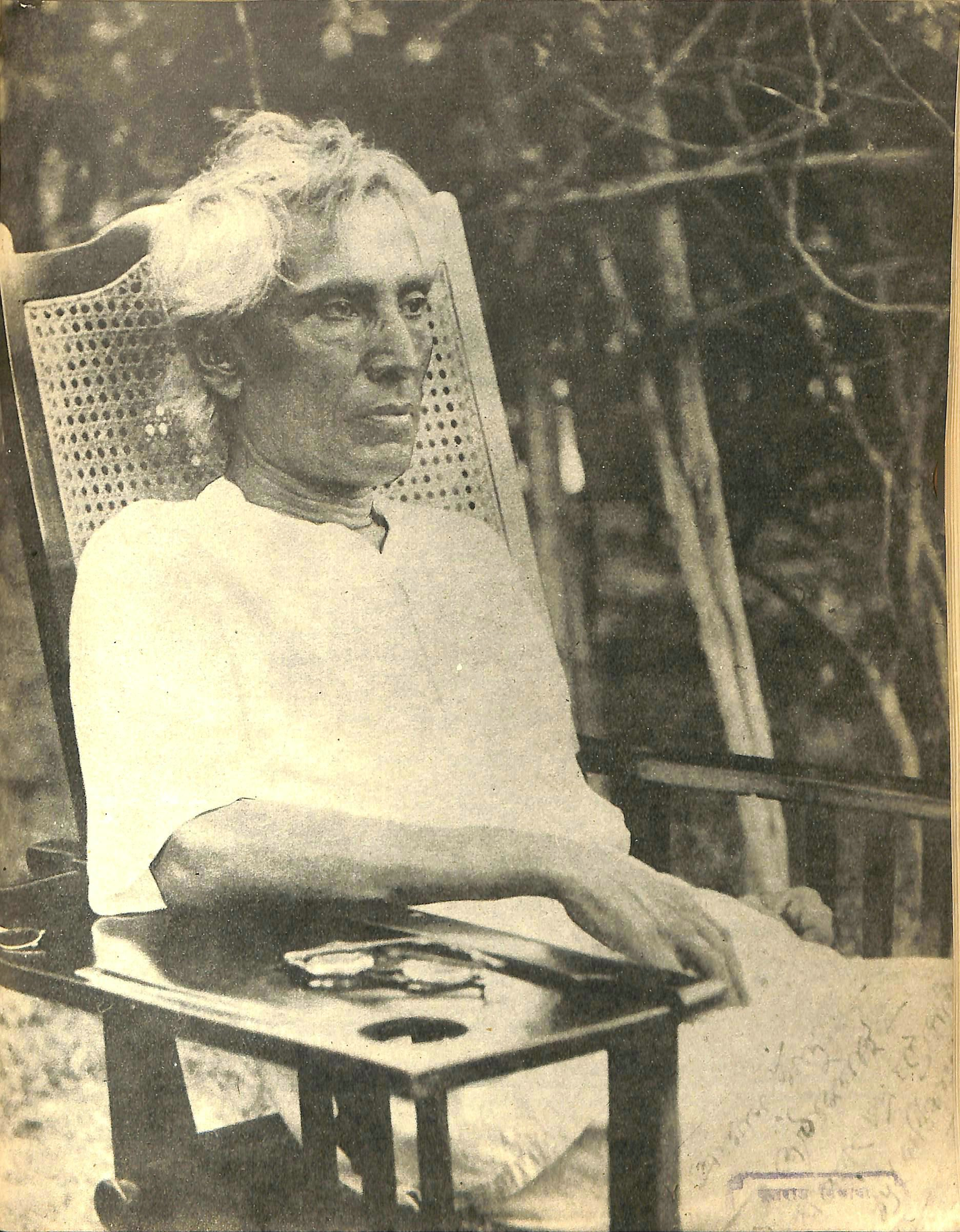
Sarat Chandra Chattopadhyay

Emperor vs Sarat Chandra is centered around the political crisis that mainly surrounded Sarat Chandra Chattopadhyay's novel Pather Dabi, from its publishing in 1926 to being banned in early 1927 for having revolutionary themes, which was averse to the prevailing colonial government of the British Raj. It has been described as a historical drama (periodical) film. Mukherji remarked that through the film, he aimed to document Chattopadhyay's writing of other works such as Devdas and Parineeta, along with the main focus on Pather Dabi. It includes other elements, namely, documenting Chattopadhyay's resistance and protests against the book's ban, his appeal to Rabindranath Tagore for guidance regarding the ban, and other debates and arguments that stemmed from the ban.

Pather Dabi was published in 1926, written by Chattopadhyay. It had Sabyasachi (Mallick) as its protagonist. However, it drew attention from the colonial government after its publication and was banned in 1927. Around 5,000 copies of the first edition of the novel were sold out within a week from publication. Chattopadhyay appealed to Tagore for advice about the book's ban. Their correspondence is shown in the film itself. Tagore replied to him that the book appeared to him to have a rebellious attitude and revolutionary themes to the British. Chattopadhyay explained his intent behind the writing and his position on the purpose of this novel. The two writers had different opinions based on freedom, equality and literature. Mukherji recreated these topics in it. The film revolves around nationalism, resistance, censorship and the relationship between the individual and state. Among these themes, Mukherji considered the film to attract conversations over the culture of ban, citing Chattopadhyay as a power to resistance.

A teaser of it released on September 2, 2026 suggested a theme where literature, colonialism, politics and call for independence were connected. The main film explores the desire for independence against the British and the power of the writings of Chattopadhyay. The film was said to be between a real historical film and a literary fiction film. Mukherji regarded Emperor vs Sarat Chandra as an "eternal story where the underdog is the pen and the opponent is the tyrant sword." He added that it would highlight the struggle for freedom in both real-life and literary terms. The released teaser gave a glimpse of the characters, atmosphere and conflicts and the main aspects of the film. Aajkaal noted Emperor vs Sarat Chandra as a combination of history, literature, politics and revolution.

The film, set in the backdrop of India (mostly Bengal) under the British control, contains depictions of political themes and messages. It portrays Sabyasachi, a revolutionary and Chattopadhyay, a writer and includes other Bengali writers who had a factor in Bengal's literature. Ankita Das writes about it in an article, "The unspeakable atrocities of the British in subjugated India and the role of writers like Sarat Chandra and Rabindranath Tagore who wrote against it are also very important in this film. How Pather Dabi gave the youth the courage to fight against the British rule with their eyes closed and how the British government could not extinguish the fire of freedom burning in the hearts of the people even after burning the book - this film will portray the story of that struggle."

== Marketing ==
Actor Amitabh Bachchan shared the trailer for the film that was released on October 1, drawing national attention to it prior to the release during Durga Puja. He shared the film on social media, celebrating the 150th birth anniversary of Sarat Chandra Chattopadhyay, who was born in 1876. He also highlighted his other works such as Devdas and Parineeta. Mukherji replied to Bachchan's post, thanking him and saying that his post was of "immense importance" to the film's team.

By October, the film appeared on IMDb charts and lists for the most anticipated Indian films, placing itself in high-ranking spots. Popularity for Emperor vs Sarat Chandra began to rise before Durga Puja festivals started from October 16, at when it was scheduled to formally release. Reasons for an increase in popularity of the film included that 2026 was the 150th birth anniversary of Chattopadhyay (who was born in 1876) and the centennial of Pather Dabi (that was published in 1926). On October 8, it reached the number one spot for the highest anticipated Indian movies and shows on IMDb in terms of real-time popularity.

== Release ==
The film was released on October 15, 2026, coinciding with Durga Puja in Bengal. It has a runtime of 2 hours 15 minutes (135 minutes) and was given a U/A certificate by Central Board of Film Certification. It coincided with three other Bengali films that were released on the same day or on October 16. According to Mukherji, Emperor vs Sarat Chandra got screened in less theaters than the three, and also had the lowest budget among the four. These were, namely DeSu7, directed by Dev; Bohurupi: The Golden Daku directed by Shiboprosad Mukherjee and Nandita Roy; and The Eken: Kerala-e Kurukshetra, directed by Joydeep Mukherjee.

A special screening of it was arranged in an INOX movie theater in late October, which was attended by Tollywood celebrities.

== Reception ==
=== Box office ===
Emperor vs Sarat Chandra grossed around ₹1.19 crore within 5 days of its release. It was reported to have gotten screened in about 75 screens across Bengal, with an occupancy of nearly 50%, having the second highest occupancy among the four films. It was reported to have received screens in about 46 cinema halls, in which the 75 screens were spread out. However, Sacnilk.com reported the gross to be around ₹1.14 crore, after running for seven days in theaters following release. It ranked 4th in box office among the four films released during Durga Puja, following Bohurupi: The Golden Daku, The Eken, and Desu7.

In response to the three other films that were released in Durga Puja, Mukherji commented that the budget of Emperor vs Sarat Chandra was the lowest among the four, and he expected it to get the lowest number of screens among them. He considered that the film would be successful through return on investment (ROI) during Durga Puja and not through "absolute numbers". Mukherji said the films were bound to be hits depending on how much they were loved and enjoyed by people.

=== Critical reception ===
Emperor vs Sarat Chandra received praise for the performance of Tota Roy Chowdhury, the ensemble cast and most of its filmmaking by Srijit Mukherji.

Reviewing the film, Vinayak Chakravorty of The Indian Express rated it 3/5 stars and praised the performances of Tota Roy Chowdhury and Abir Chatterjee. He called their performances to be best thing about the film, stating that Mukherji failed to make most of the material and tried to weave a lot of things into a single film. Chakravorty highlights the AI-visuals used in the film, saying that it does not fit in with the live-action footage. Agnivo Niyogi writing for The Telegraph, stated that Mukherji got several aspects of the film right, namely the performances and the casting. He stated Chowdhury to be biggest reason to watch, emphasizing his personality to Chattopadhyay. Niyogi felt that the film took too long to get to the main points and criticized the AI use to recreate old scenes.

Sanjali Brahma in an article of t2ONLINE wrote that the premise of the film was intriguing, but the execution was not satisfactory; commenting that the narrative felt chaotic in the first 30 minutes with the film jumping between historical and fictional narratives, without giving the watchers time to settle into either. She highlights the casting as a biggest strength, praising the acting of Chowdhury and all others. Giving Emperor vs Sarat Chandra 4.5/5 stars, Subhadrika Sen quoted it as "a movie that one needs to watch, especially now when pockets of India is burning, again". Sen writes that the cast, main and supporting, with their brilliant performances contribute to the film's greatness. Talking about the non-linear storyline, Sen remarks that while the beginning may be a possible confusion to viewers, it normalizes itself as the narrative progresses.

Subhas K. Jha reviewed the film, feeling that the two nonlinear storylines would have worked better if presented in separate films. He considered the supporting cast to be "uniformly engaging", and deemed the film to belong to Chowdhury's and Chatterjee's performances. He remarked the music and songs to feel organic. Rating the film 3.5/5 stars. Raima Ganguly of the Times of India accentuated Mukherji' blending of historical and fictional events, commending Chowdhury for his "compelling performance" and Chatterjee's acting, stating Sanjoy Nag's acting as Tagore gives gravitas to it. Ganguly ends her review saying "The film may have its occasional lulls, but it ultimately leaves one reflecting on the courage it takes to stand by one's beliefs...", rating it 4 out of 5 stars.

Rupak Mishra quoted, "Srijit Mukherjee has written the story of a mysterious fiction writer with impartial, courageous and objective feelings, while carefully avoiding all the fascinating, delicious but meaningless legends, will remain an example in the history of Bengali historical-political films." in a review of Emperor vs Sarat Chandra on The Wall. He described that the heavy use of AI in some scenes depicting Rangoon and Batavia are a topic of debate and scrutiny. Mohammad Arman wrote about it: "The film's historical premise and the performances of the lead actors make it intriguing." and later writes "However, the attempt to weave together multiple narratives makes the screenplay uneven." in a description of the 3/5 stars given by Indian Express.

Jago Bangla released a review of it, saying that one should watch the film if they want to know history and the relationships and differences of different writers and political figures of that time, regarding it as an intellectual and literary film. The review approved the performances of Chowdhury, besides Chatterjee's and other crew that worked on it. Reviewing the film for The Indian Express (Bengali edition), Naikun Nessa determined the acting of Chowdhury and Chatterjee to be commendable in their efforts to portray Chattopadhyay and Sabyasachi respectively. He praised supporting actors, makeup by Kundu and the music. Nessa ended his review by stating it is "not a perfect film" and could have benefited from focusing on a specific theme and without improper AI usage.

Sankha Ray penned in a critic review of Letterboxd after watching it on October 15, 2026, evaluating his opinion on it. He compared Mukherji's style to the filmmaking of Quentin Tarantino:

Srijit Mukherji’s new movie, Emperor vs. Saratchandra, is one of the boldest films of recent times and, in my opinion, Srijit’s boldest film to date. [...] The film's editing and cinematography are praiseworthy. The use of VFX catches the eye slightly, but keeping the budget of Bengali cinema in mind, it is acceptable. [...] Thank you to Srijit Mukherji for this attempt—for thinking in a new way. Once again, Quentin Tarantino's quote comes to mind.

In a review article of the film on Sangbad Pratidin, Ranjan Bandyopadhyay commented that Mukherji did a good job with his weaving of Chattopadhyay and history of Pather Dabi into one film without significant mistakes. He praises the acting of Chowdhury and the performance of other cast members. Newspaper Aajkaal assessed it and rated 4/5 stars. Manideep Saha of Aajkaal remarked "I would like to say that 'Emperor vs. Sarat Chandra' is actually a story of tyranny versus freedom, a story of power versus revolution, a story of Durga versus demons. A story in which there is devotion within revolution, and again, there is revolution within devotion." He applauded Chowdhury's rendition of Chattopadhyay and assessed the music to be relevant to the film itself.

== See also ==
- Srikanta
- Sarat Chandra Chattopadhyay filmography
