= Kulgachia railway station =

Railway station in West Bengal, India

Kulgachia
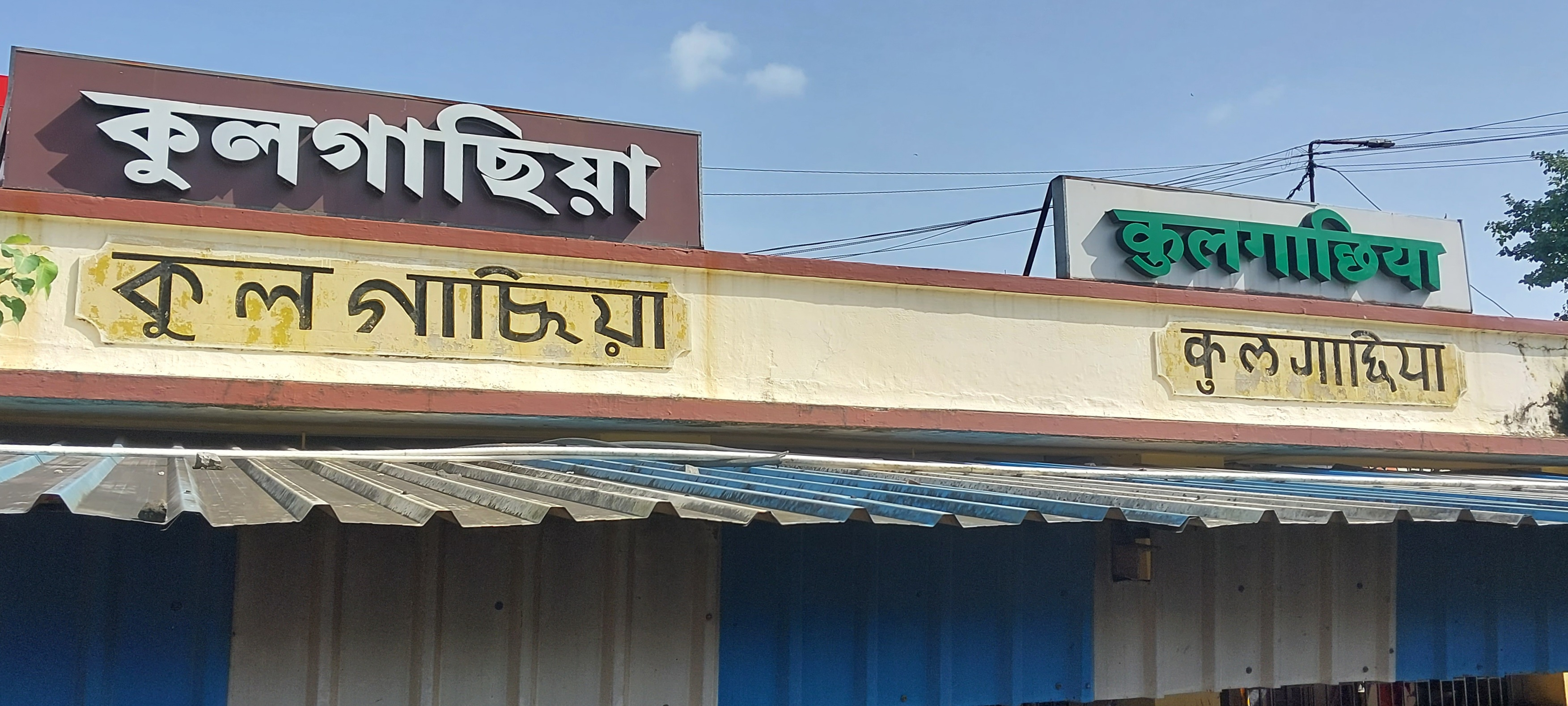

General information
- Location: Kulgachia, Howrah district, West Bengal; India
- Coordinates: 22°28′20″N 88°01′14″E
- Elevation: 7 metres (23 ft)
- System: Kolkata Suburban Railway station
- Owner: Indian Railways
- Line: Howrah–Kharagpur line
- Platforms: 3

Construction
- Structure type: Standard on-ground station
- Parking: No
- Cycle facilities: yes

Other information
- Station code: KGY
- Fare zone: South Eastern Railway

History
- Opened: 1900
- Electrified: 1967–69

Services
Preceding station	Kolkata Suburban Railway	Following station
Bagnan towards Midnapore	South Eastern Line Howrah–Kharagpur line	Bir Shibpur towards Howrah Junction
Route map
Location
- Location within West Bengal

The Kulgachia railway station in the Indian state of West Bengal, serves Kulgachia, India in Howrah district. It is on the Howrah–Kharagpur line. It is 40 km (25 mi) from Howrah Station.

== History ==
The Howrah–Kharagpur line was opened in 1900.

== Tracks ==
The Howrah–Panskura stretch has three lines.

== Electrification ==
The Howrah–Kharagpur line was electrified in 1967–69.
