= Shoite Shoite =

2026 song by Timir Biswas

- Single cover

Single by Timir Biswas featuring Srijit Mukherji, Sutirtha Chakraborty and Antaraa Bhataacharya

from the album Emperor vs Sarat Chandra
- Language: Bengali
- Released: September 10, 2026 (single); October 15, 2026 (with film)
- Studio: Audio Lake (Kolkata)
- Genre: Protest music
- Length: 5:35
- Label: Nandy Movies
- Songwriter: Srijit Mukherji
- Producers: Souptik Mazumder; Achin Sarkar

"Shoite Shoite" is a song from the 2026 epic historical drama film Emperor vs Sarat Chandra, directed by Srijit Mukherji and based on the novel Pather Dabi written by Sarat Chandra Chattopadhyay. It is performed by singer Timir Biswas, with lyrics and music by Mukherji. The song was the debut of Mukherji as a songwriter.

== Background and making ==
Srijit Mukherji earlier composed and wrote the song "Ador" in the 2026 film Abhhiman directed by Indraadip Dasgupta. However, Mukherji considered "Shoite Shoite" to be his debut as a music composer. "Shoite Shoite" was written and composed by Mukherji, with the main vocals given by Timir Biswas with other supporting vocals.

Announcements of Mukherji's debut as a music composer and songwriter in the film were circulated as early as November 2025, at when the film had not started filming. He was stated to be composing and writing both the soundtrack to the film and the background music, however, Indraadip Dasgupta later took charge to making the background score for Emperor vs Sarat Chandra.

The song's release on September 10, 2026, followed a teaser release for Emperor vs Sarat Chandra that was released on September 2. It was Mukherji's first song he wrote in his own directed film. According to ETV Bharat, it "conveyed the rebellious spirit of the film through his (Mukherji's) own cinematic ideas along with the language of music".

On September 10, it was formally released at the Kolkata Centre for Creativity in Kolkata by singer-songwriter Anupam Roy who was accompanied by Mukherji and cast actors from the film itself. It was labeled and presented under the production company Nandy Movies, and its owner Pradip Kumar Nandy served as the primary producer for Emperor vs Sarat Chandra. Actors from the film, Mukherji and Roy commented about the song's release. Other members related to the film were also present in it.

Mukherji said that he was thinking of composing and writing songs for his own films. After he started working on the film, Mukherji felt that he was ready to take the responsibility for the soundtrack. Mukherji commented that he felt indebted to the musical team for being able to turn his compositions into songs. He composed songs before, but stated this was his first time composing a full album.

== Themes and reception ==
ETV Bharat described "Shoite Shoite" as a protest song created around the atmospheres of rebellion, protest and resistance. The Telegraph wrote "Shoite Shoite reflects the turbulent atmosphere of British-occupied Bengal hailing revolution, defiance, and anti-colonial resistance." Mukherji termed it as the "musical spine of the film", stating that it depicts the journeys of both Sarat Chandra Chattopadhyay, and Sabyasachi, the protagonist of the film. He said that being able to compose and write "Shoite Shoite" felt as a "liberating experience" to him because he was able to express his emotions and feelings musically rather than verbal speeches.

"Shoite Shoite" draws its themes and lyrics from the colonial backdrop of Emperor vs Sarat Chandra, at when the colonial government exerted control under the British Raj and the ban behind Pather Dabi by the British, which was protested by Chattopadhay. It reflects on the idea of enduring oppression and offer resistance to the rule, acting as a response to oppressions conducted by the British.

Piya Roy in a review of the song on t2ONLINE writes that "Shoite Shoite" narrates how prolonged endurance and resistance to oppressions and abuse perpetrated by the British led to resistance and uprising against them. It was written in accordance to the film's plot, describing the atmosphere of the then Bengal and the mindsets of revolutionaries, also suggesting the influence of Pather Dabi in the lives of Bengalis. The music video that accompanied it showed the picturizing on Sabyasachi and Chattopadhay.

== Personnel ==
Credits adapted from India Blooms and Nandy Movies.

- Srijit Mukherji – lyrics, music, backing vocals
- Timir Biswas – vocals
- Souptik Mazumder – music (associate director), production
- Sutirtha Chakraborty – vocal hook ("Shoite Shoite" lines)
- Antaraa Bhataacharya – backing vocals
- Achin Sarkar – mixing and mastering, production
- Goutam Basu – recording of live instruments and vocals at Audio Lake studio
