= Samta, India =

Samta
- Village
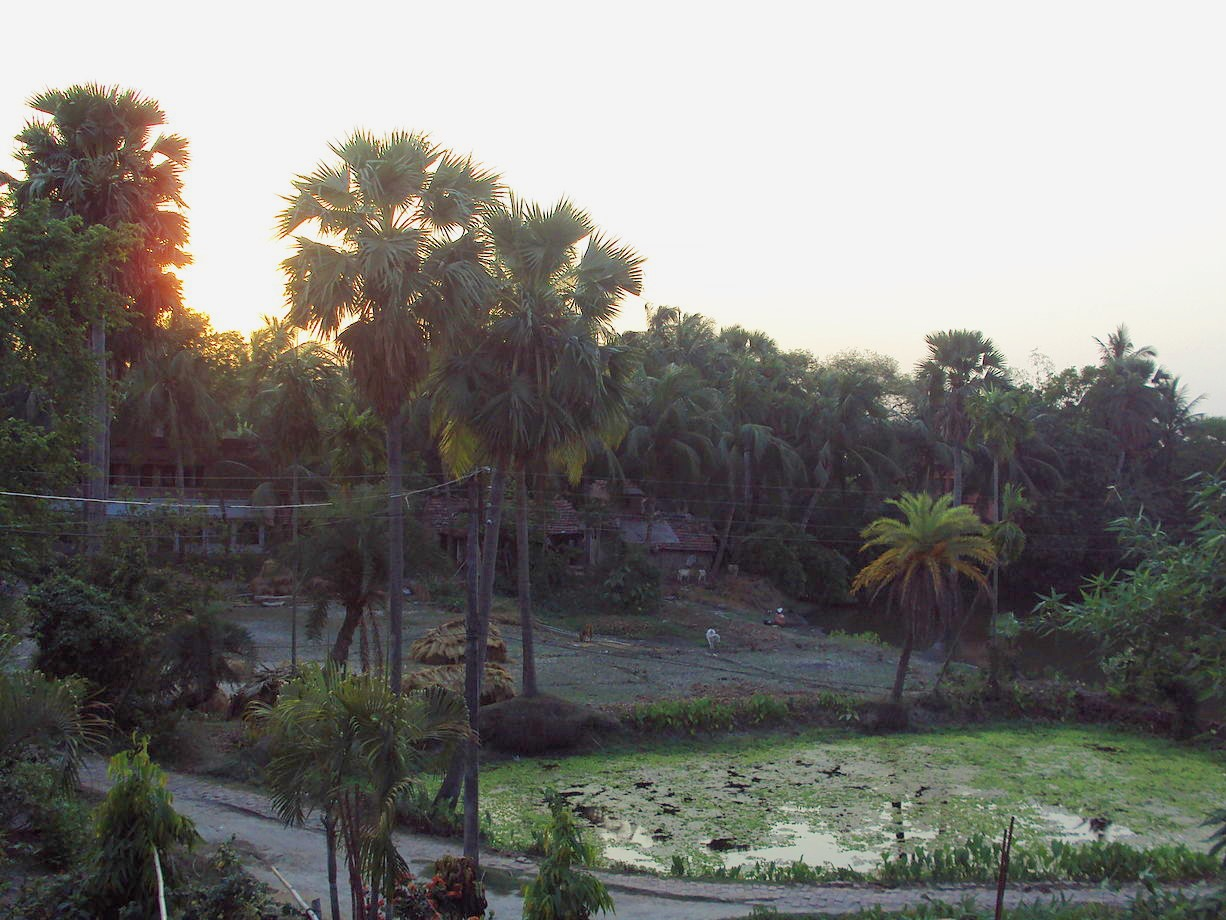

- Location in West Bengal, India Samta (India)
- Coordinates: 22.4720338°N 87.90793059999999°E
- Country: India
- State: West Bengal
- District: Howrah

Languages
  - Mostly Spoken: Bengali
- Time zone: UTC+5:30 (IST)
- PIN: 711324
- Telephone code: 03214
- Lok Sabha constituency: Uluberia

Samta (pronounced [ʃaːmtaː]) is a village and a gram panchayat in the Howrah district of West Bengal, India, on the banks of the Rupnarayan river. Samta is noted for being the home of Sarat Chandra Chattopadhyay (namely, Sarat Chandra Kuthi) for twelve years, starting from the year 1923. The terracotta temple of Madangopal jiu is located in the neighbouring village of Mellak. Samta is connected to the state capital, Kolkata, through the National Highway 6, that also connects it to the nearby towns of Bagnan and Kolaghat. Samta hosts few educational facilities including the Samta Sarat Chandra Girls High School, among others.

== History ==
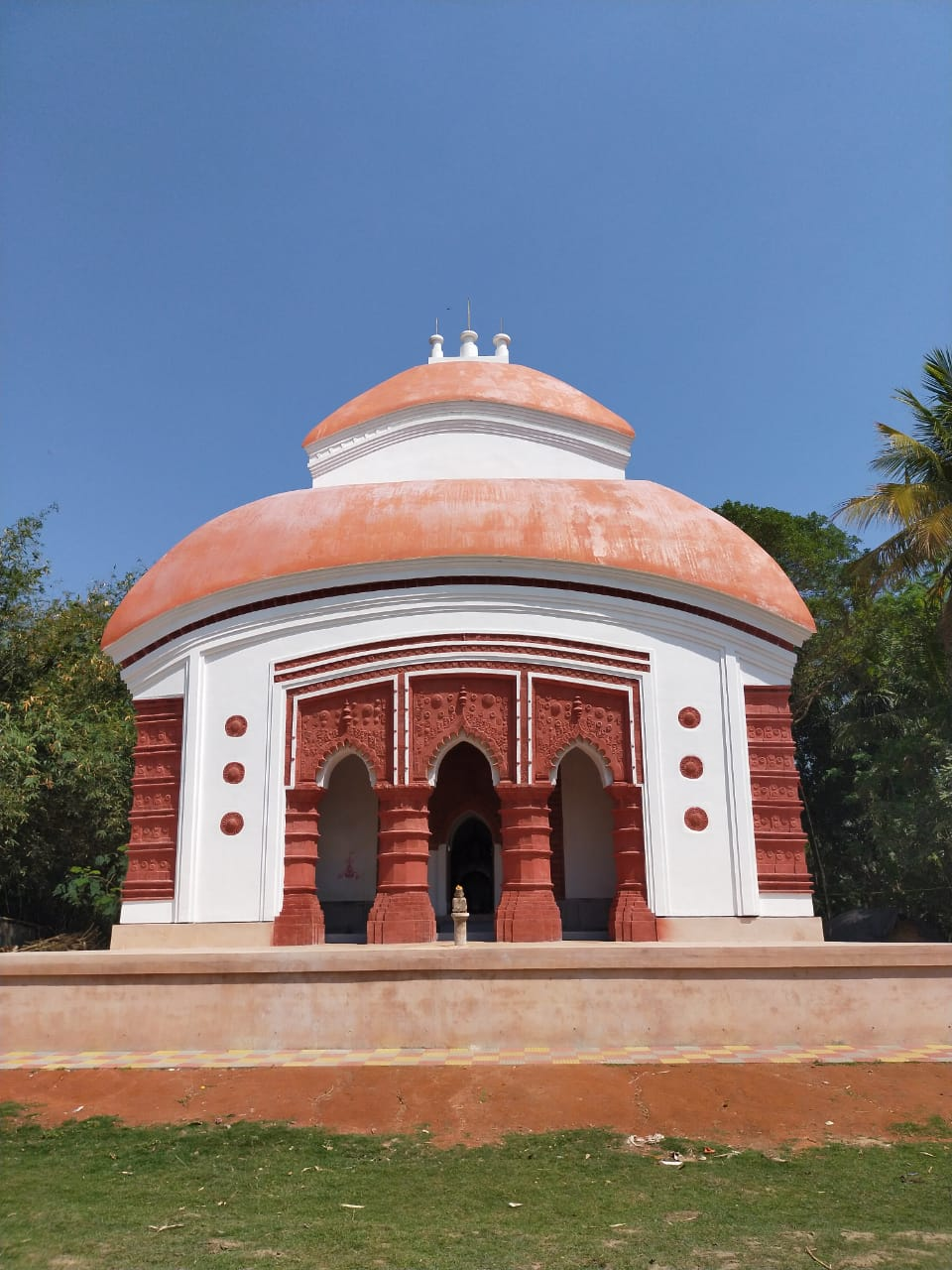
The Madangopal jiu temple, in the neighbouring village of Mellak

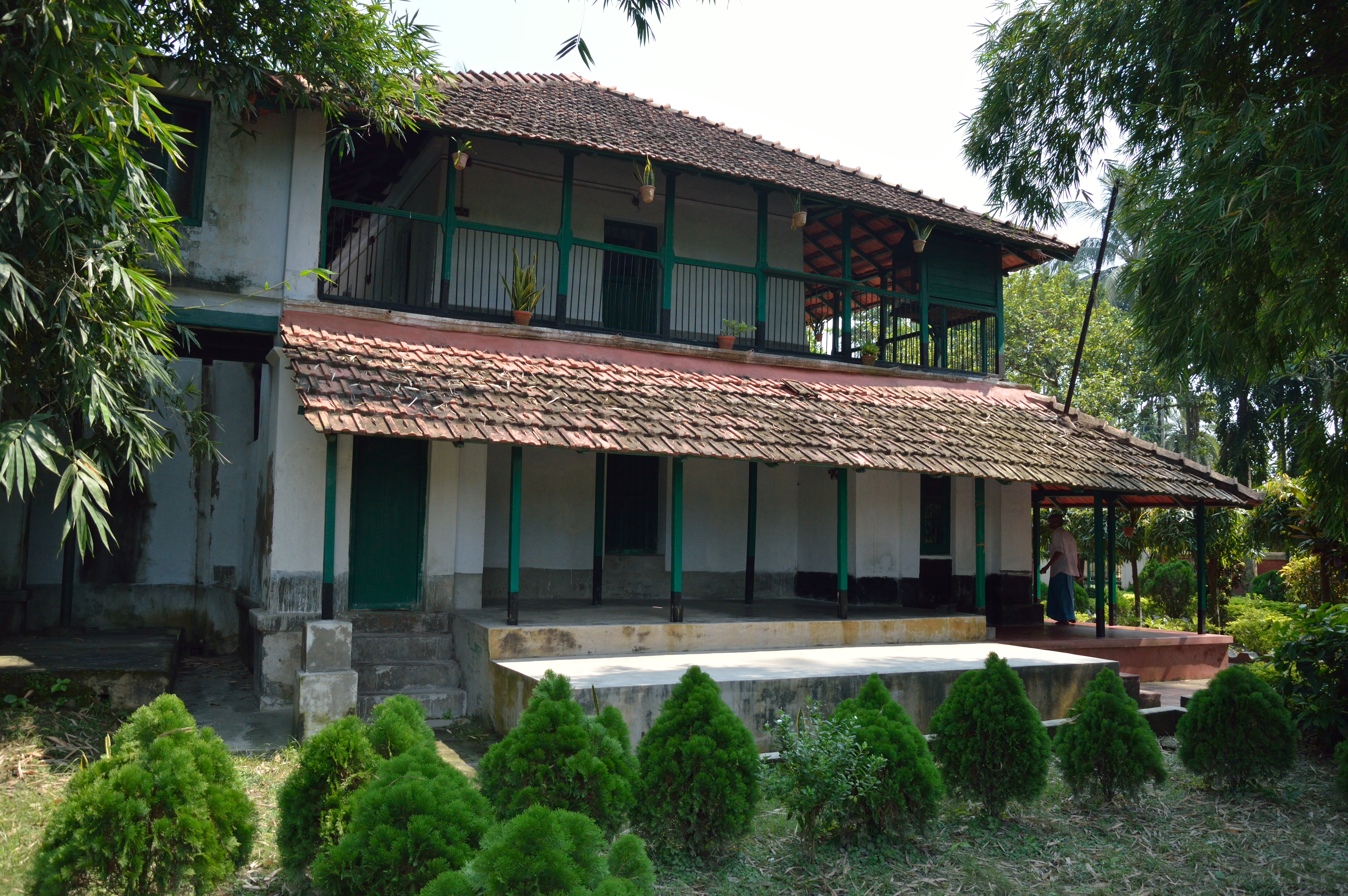
Sarat Chandra's house in Samta

During the British Raj, Samta was the power-hold of the local Roy zamindars, subordinate to the Burdwan Raj Estate, who was in turn subordinate to the British empire. Following Indian independence, the village came to be governed by the government of India.

Festivals including Dol purnima, Durga puja, Shivaratri, Shitala puja, Itu puja, and Janmashtami, among others, are celebrated in the village. Gajan sessions are also held during festivals. The terracotta temple of Madangopal jiu, built in the 17th century CE, is located in the neighbouring village of Mellak, south of Samta. It is locally known as Gopaler Mondir (literally, "the temple of Gopala"). The temple was commissioned by Mukundaprasad Roychowdhury, a member of Mellak's then Roychowdhury zamindars.

Samta was home to Bengali novelist, Sarat Chandra Chattopadhyay, for twelve years, until he moved to Kolkata. His house in Samta, constructed in 1923 by local worker Gopal Das, is known as Sarat Chandra Kuthi (or alternatively as, Sarat Smriti Mandir). He had fenced his house and the adjacent area, renaming it as Samtaber. His novels such as Devdas were serialised during his stay in Samta, while he wrote stories including Ramesh and Ramer Sumati, among others, during the years he lived in the village. Sarat Chandra Kuthi is a heritage-historical site under the West Bengal Heritage Commission Act (IX) of 2001. In 2009, the structure underwent renovation. An annual fair, by the name of Sarat Mela, is held in late January in Samta's neighbouring village Panitras, located north of Samta, in remembrance of the novelist.

== Geography ==
Samta is located on the plains of the Rupnarayan river, situated about a kilometre (0.62 miles) away from its banks.

== Infrastructure ==
=== Education ===
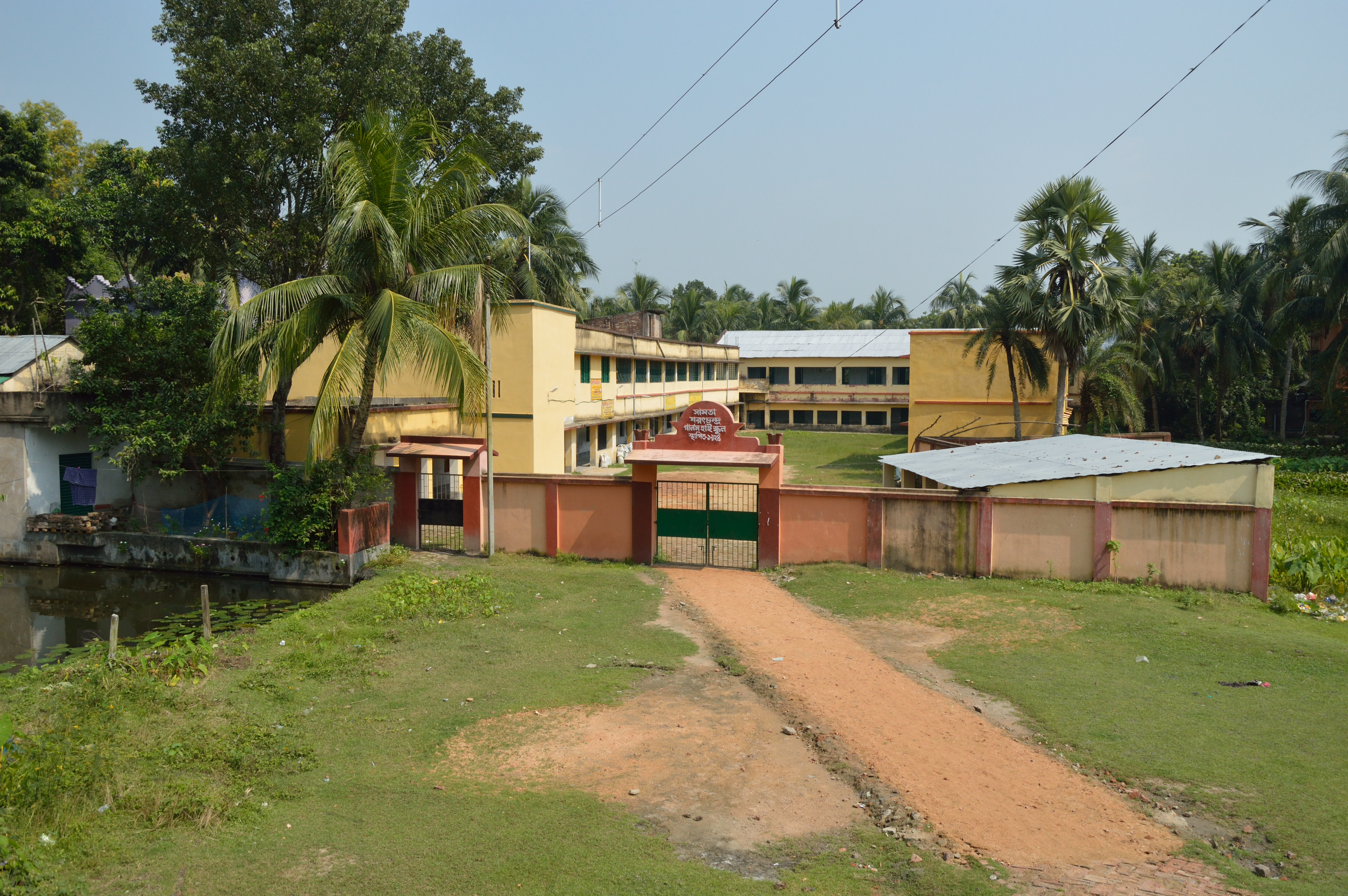
Sarat Chandra Girls High School, in Samta

There are a few schools in Samta including Samta Sarat Chandra Girls High School (established by Sarat Chandra Chattopadhyay himself, in 1924) and Samta Primary School.

=== Transport ===
The village is connected to the National Highway 6, also known as the Bombay Road, through a road known as the Sarat Road. The national highway links Samta to Kolkata, the state capital, and towns including Bagnan and Kolaghat. The village has a barrage, a kind of breakwater, created to protect the village in times of floods. The barrage road, the Sarat Road, and other village roads together links Samta to its nearby villages including Mellak, Panitras, Birampur, and others. The Sarat Road starts at Mellak from the national highway, south of Samta, and extends to Kalyanpur and Hooghly in the north.

Local transport exists in the form of rickshaws, rickshaw-vans, and trekkers (a kind of jeep). The nearest railway station is the Deulti railway station located across the highway, that connects Samta and its neighbouring villages to the Howrah Junction railway station.

== Gallery ==
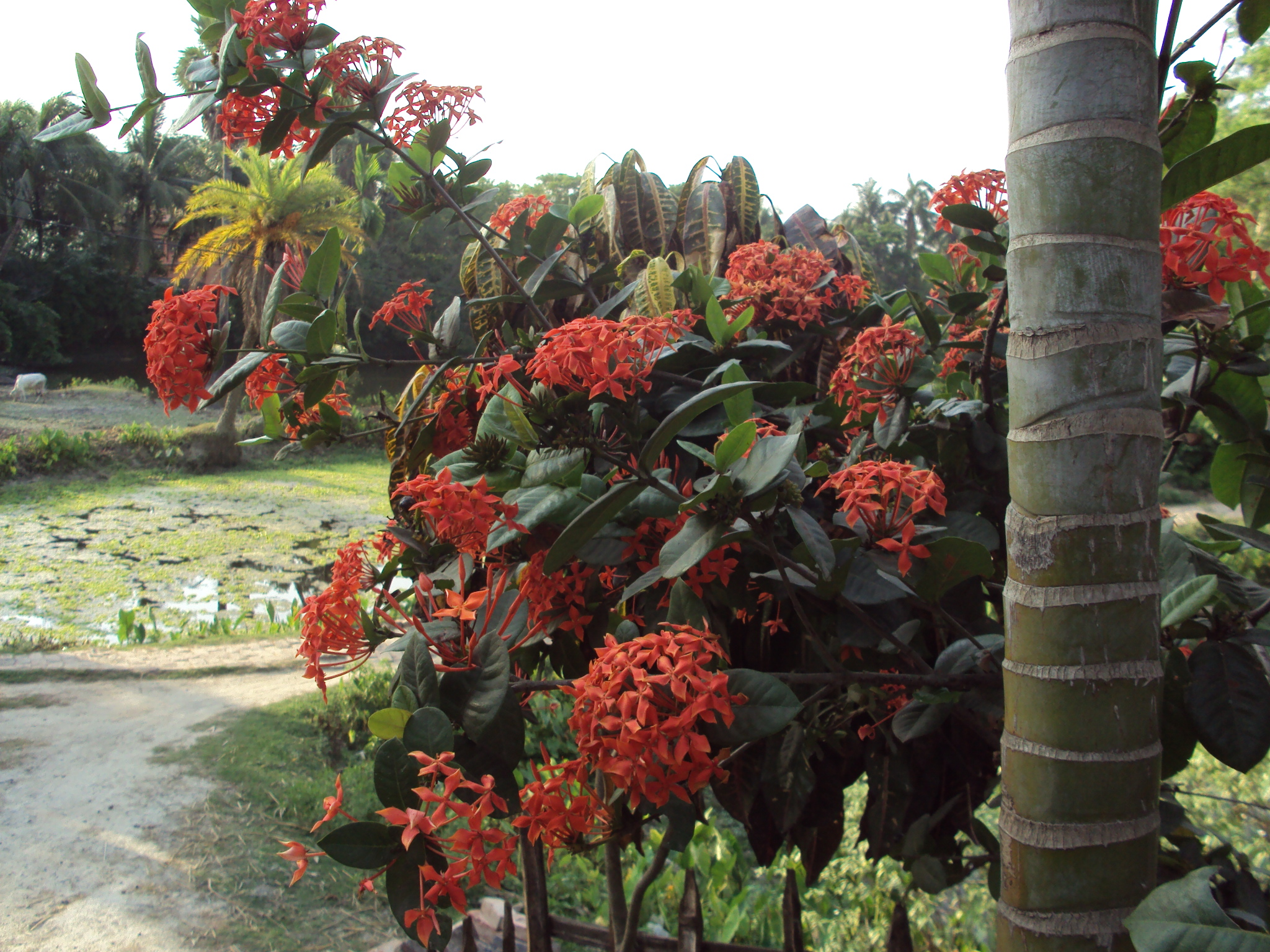
Ixora flowers in a house's garden

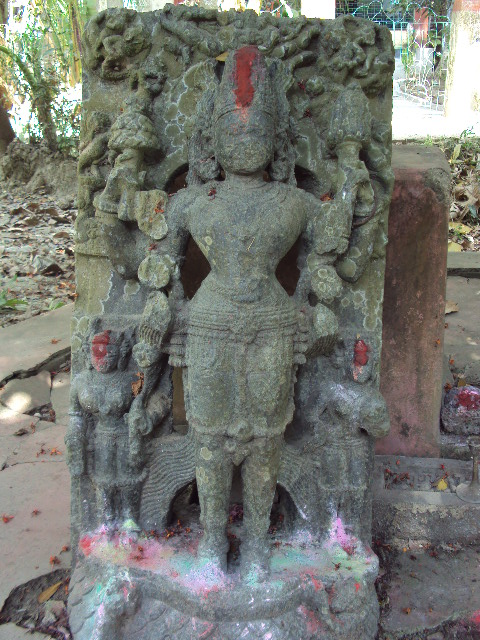
Sculpture of a Hindu deity, in Samta

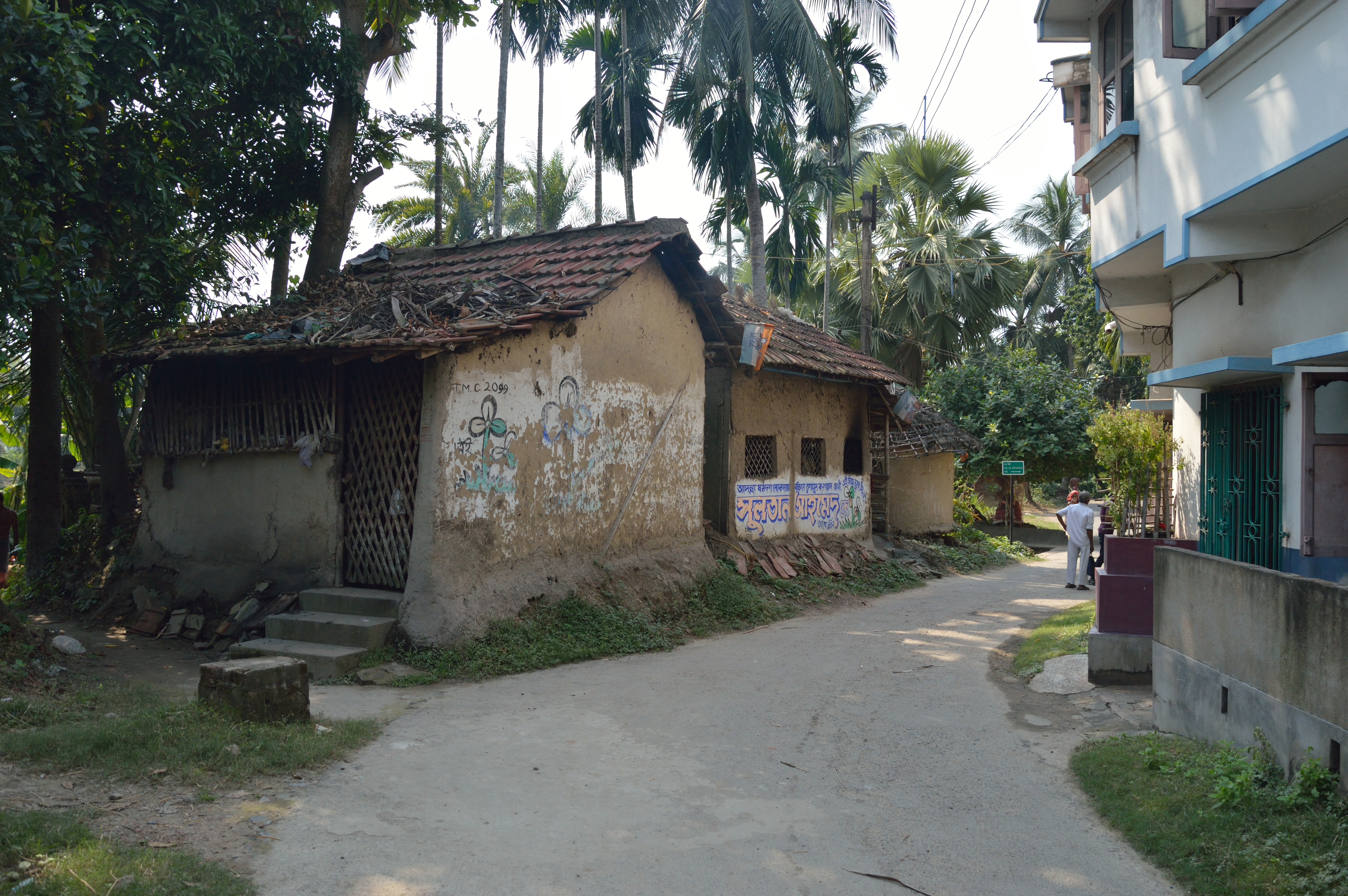
Mud houses in the village

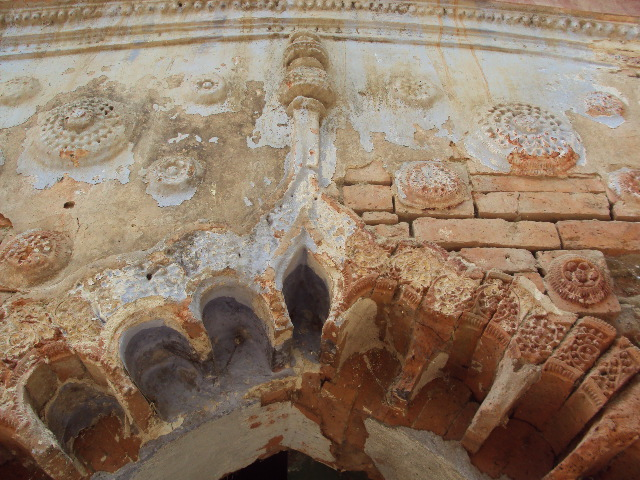
Arches of the Madangopal temple

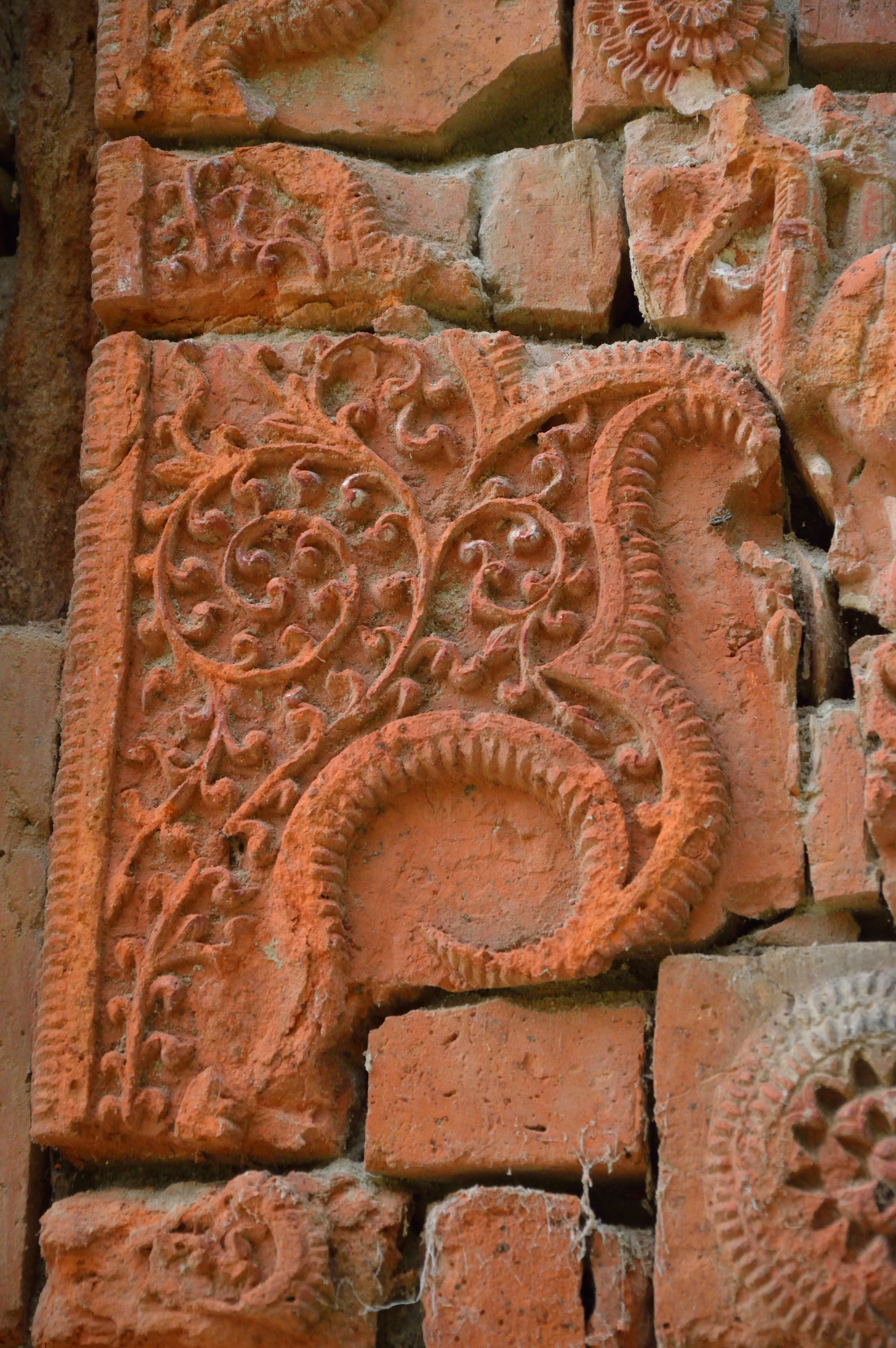
Terracotta motif on the walls of the Madangopal temple

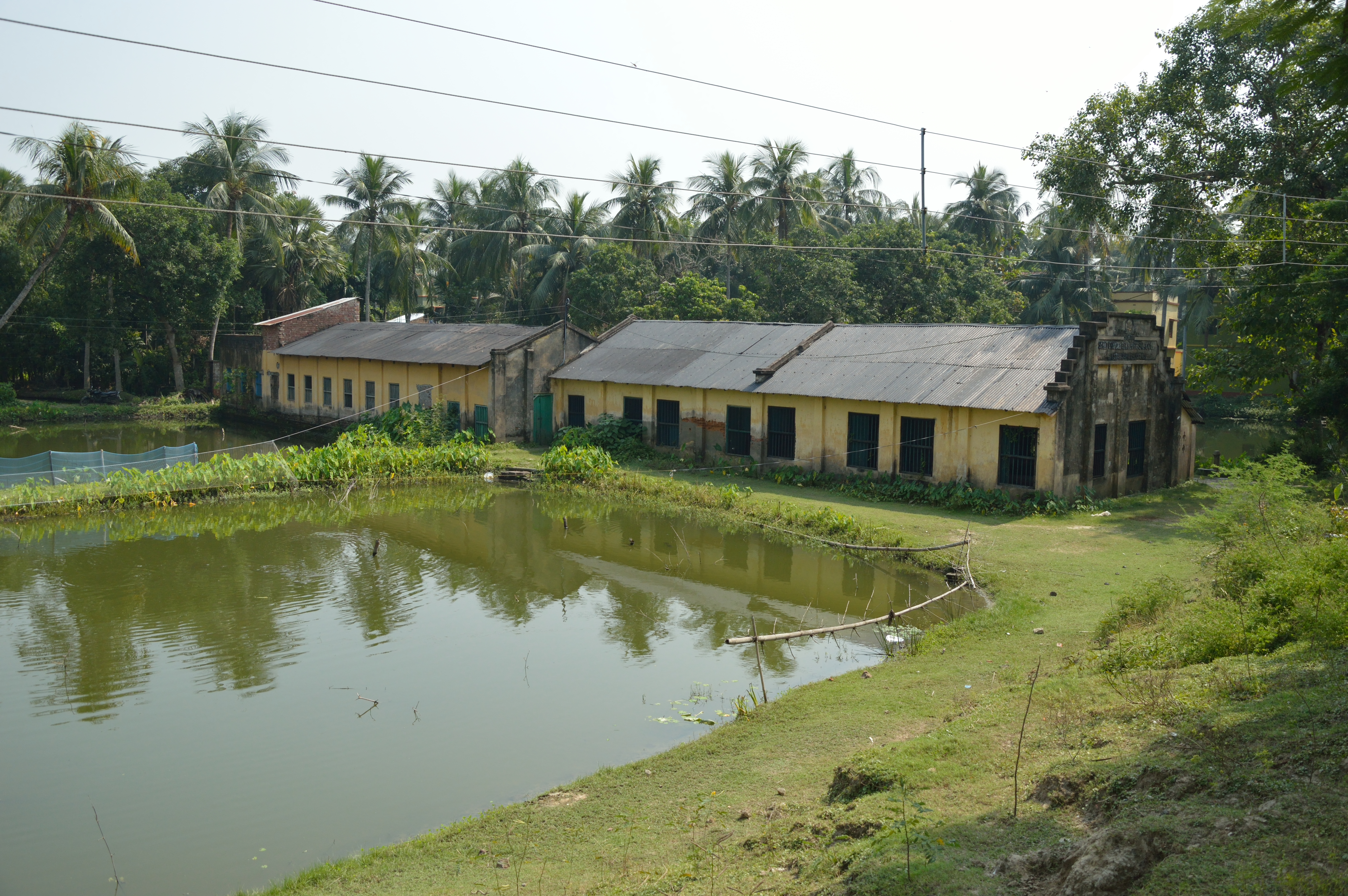
Old wing of the Samta Sarat Chandra Girls High School

== See also ==
- Madangopal Jiu Temple
- Sarat Chandra Kuthi
