= Kolaghat railway station =

Railway station in West Bengal, India

Kolaghat
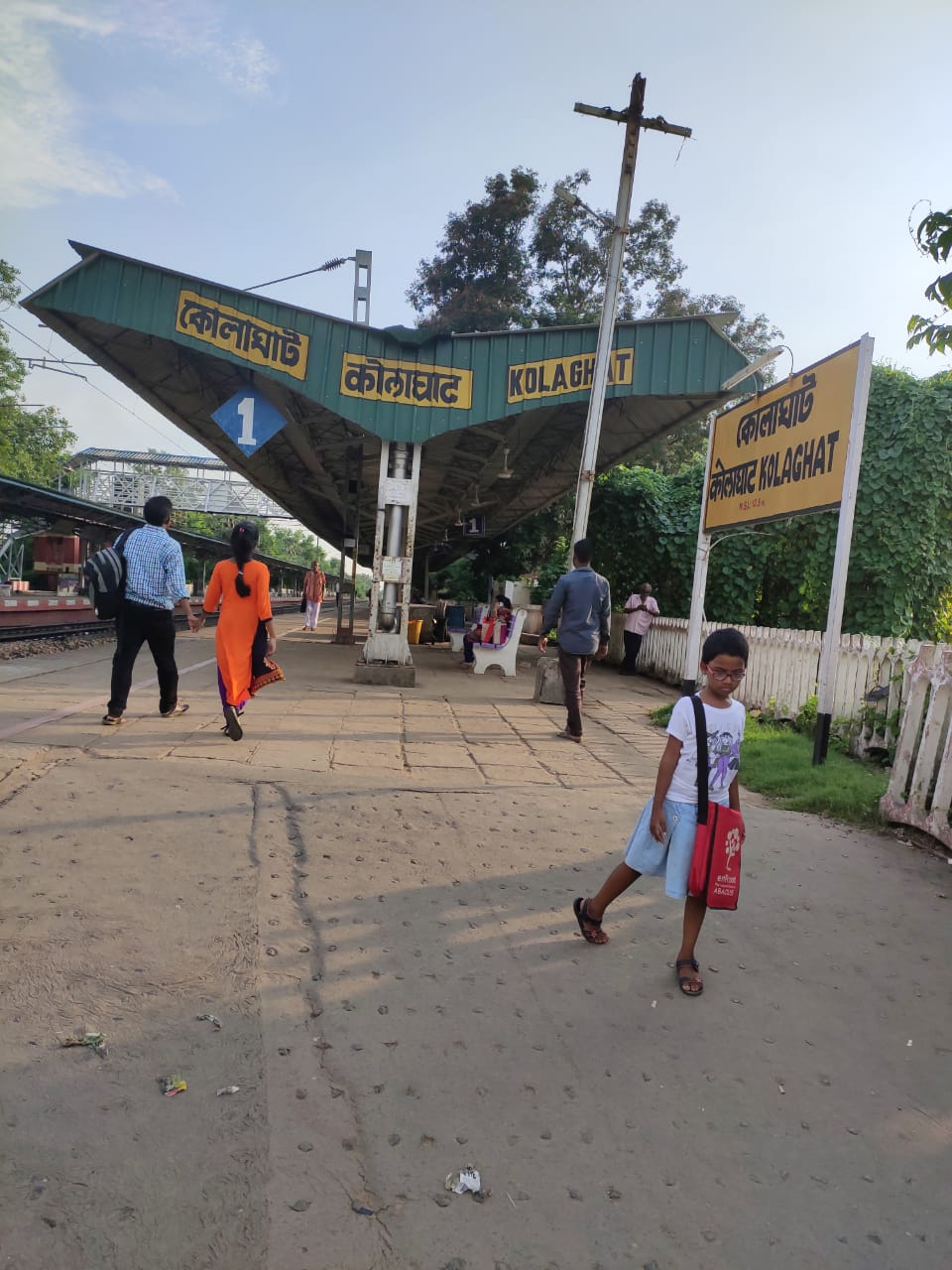
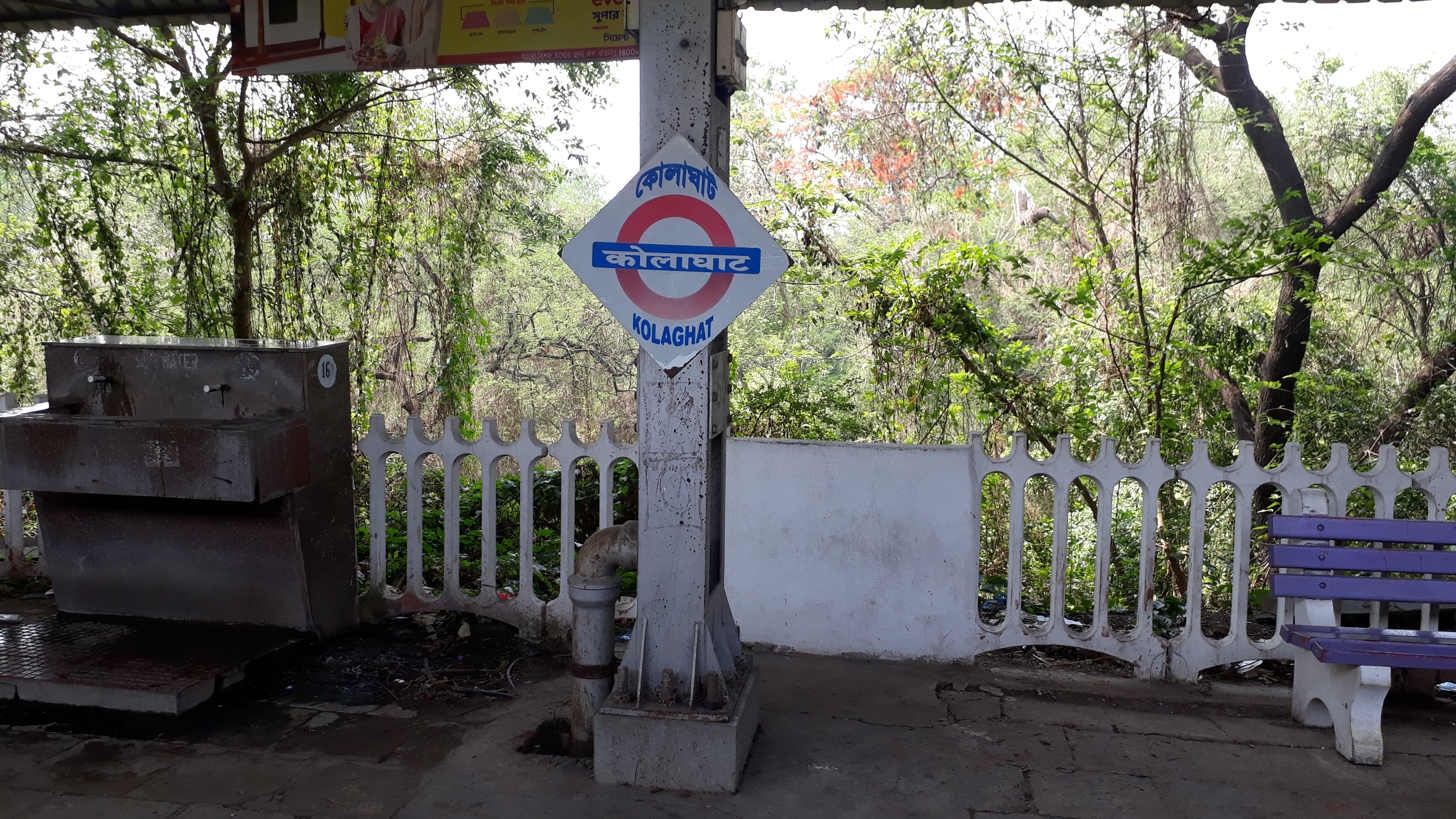
- Kolaghat railway station, Platform No 1&2 Kolaghat railway station Platform No 3

General information
- Location: Kolaghat, Purba Medinipur district, West Bengal; India
- Coordinates: 22°26′06″N 87°52′51″E
- Elevation: 10 metres (33 ft)
- System: Kolkata Suburban Railway station
- Owner: Indian Railways
- Line: Howrah–Kharagpur line
- Platforms: 3
- Tracks: 3

Construction
- Structure type: Standard on-ground station
- Parking: Available

Other information
- Station code: KIG
- Fare zone: South Eastern Railway

History
- Opened: 1900
- Electrified: 1967–69
- Former names: East Indian Railway Company

Passengers
- 0.4 million/day

Services
Preceding station	Kolkata Suburban Railway	Following station
Mecheda towards Midnapore	South Eastern Line Howrah–Kharagpur line	Deulti towards Howrah Junction
Route map
Location
- Location within West Bengal

The Kolaghat railway station in the Indian state of West Bengal, serves Kolaghat, India in Purba Medinipur district. It is on the Howrah–Kharagpur line. It is 55 km (34 mi) from Howrah Station.

== History ==
The Howrah–Kharagpur line was opened in 1900.

== Tracks ==
The Howrah–Panskura stretch has three lines. Platform No 1 and 2 are attached but Platform No 3 is detached from the other two Platforms. Usually down trains (towards Howrah) are available on Platform no 1. Up trains (towards Kharagpur, Medinipur) are available on platform no 2 & 3. To reaching both platforms (1 & 2,3) one have to climb a hill like slope. The distance between two platforms are more than 150 meter and the slope is more than 15 meter high from the Kolaghat locality.

== Electrification ==
The Howrah–Kharagpur line was electrified in 1967–69.
