= Deulti railway station =

Railway station in West Bengal, India

Deulti
- Deulti railway station

General information
- Location: Deulti, Howrah district, West Bengal; India
- Coordinates: 22°27′12″N 87°54′53″E
- Elevation: 10 metres (33 ft)
- System: Kolkata Suburban Railway station
- Owner: Indian Railways
- Line: Howrah–Kharagpur line
- Platforms: 5

Construction
- Structure type: Standard on-ground station
- Parking: No
- Cycle facilities: yes

Other information
- Station code: DTE
- Fare zone: South Eastern Railway

History
- Opened: 1900
- Electrified: 1967–69

Services
Preceding station	Kolkata Suburban Railway	Following station
Kolaghat towards Midnapore	South Eastern Line Howrah–Kharagpur line	Ghoraghata towards Howrah Junction
Route map
Location
- Location within West Bengal Location within India

The Deulti railway station in the Indian state of West Bengal, serves Deulti, India in Howrah district. It is on the Howrah–Kharagpur line. It is 51 km (32 mi) from Howrah Station.

== History ==
The Howrah–Kharagpur line was opened in 1900.

== Tracks ==
The Howrah–Panskura stretch has three lines.

== Electrification ==
The Howrah–Kharagpur line was electrified in 1967–69.
