= Ghoraghata railway station =

Railway station in West Bengal, India

Ghoraghata
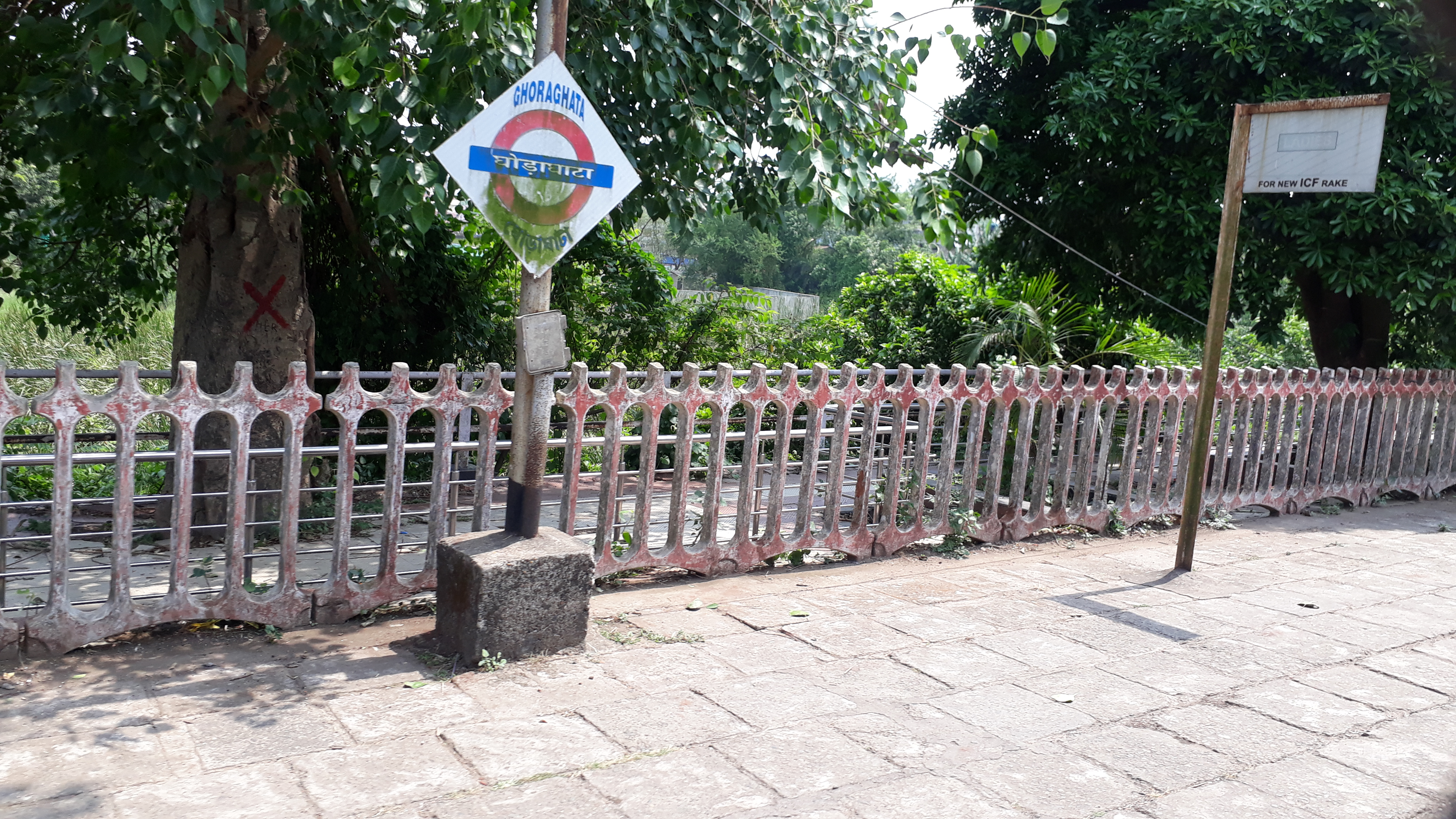
- Ghoraghata railway station

General information
- Location: Ghoraghata, Bagnan, Howrah district
- System: Kolkata Suburban Railway station
- Owner: Indian Railways
- Line: Howrah–Kharagpur line
- Platforms: 2

Construction
- Structure type: Standard on-ground station
- Parking: No
- Cycle facilities: No

Other information
- Station code: GGTA
- Fare zone: South Eastern Railway

Services
| Preceding station | Kolkata Suburban Railway | Following station |
|---|---|---|
| Deulti towards Midnapore | South Eastern Line Howrah–Kharagpur line | Bagnan towards Howrah Junction |
Route map
Location
- Location within West Bengal Location within India

The Ghoraghata railway station in the Indian state of West Bengal, serves Ghoraghata, India in Howrah district. It is on the Howrah–Kharagpur line. It is 48 km (30 mi) from Howrah Station.

== History ==
The Howrah–Kharagpur line was opened in 1900.

== Tracks ==
The Howrah–Panskura stretch has three lines.

== Electrification ==
The Howrah–Kharagpur line was electrified in 1967–69.
