= Bagnan railway station =

Railway station in West Bengal, India

Bagnan

General information
- Location: Bagnan Station Road South, Bagnan, Howrah district, West Bengal; India
- Coordinates: 22°27′45″N 87°58′12″E
- Elevation: 8 metres (26 ft)
- System: Kolkata Suburban Railway
- Line: Howrah–Kharagpur line
- Platforms: 5
- Tracks: 5

Construction
- Structure type: At grade
- Platform levels: Ground
- Parking: No
- Cycle facilities: yes

Other information
- Station code: BZN
- Zone(s): South Eastern Railway
- Division(s): Kharagpur

History
- Opened: 1900
- Electrified: 1967–69 (25 kv 50 Hz Overhead Catenary wire)

Services
Preceding station	Kolkata Suburban Railway	Following station
Ghoraghata towards Panskura Junction	South Eastern Line Howrah–Kharagpur line	Kulgachia towards Howrah Junction
Route map
Location
- Location within West Bengal

The Bagnan railway station in the Indian state of West Bengal, serves Bagnan, India in Howrah district. It is on the Howrah–Kharagpur line. It is 45 km (28 mi) from Howrah Station. A line to Gadiara has been proposed.

== History ==
The Howrah–Kharagpur line was opened in 1900.

== Tracks ==
The Howrah–Panskura stretch has three lines.

== Electrification ==
The Howrah–Kharagpur line was electrified in 1967–69.
