= Madangopal Jiu Temple =

Hindu temple dedicated to Radha and Madangopala in Howrah, India

- গোপালের মন্দির
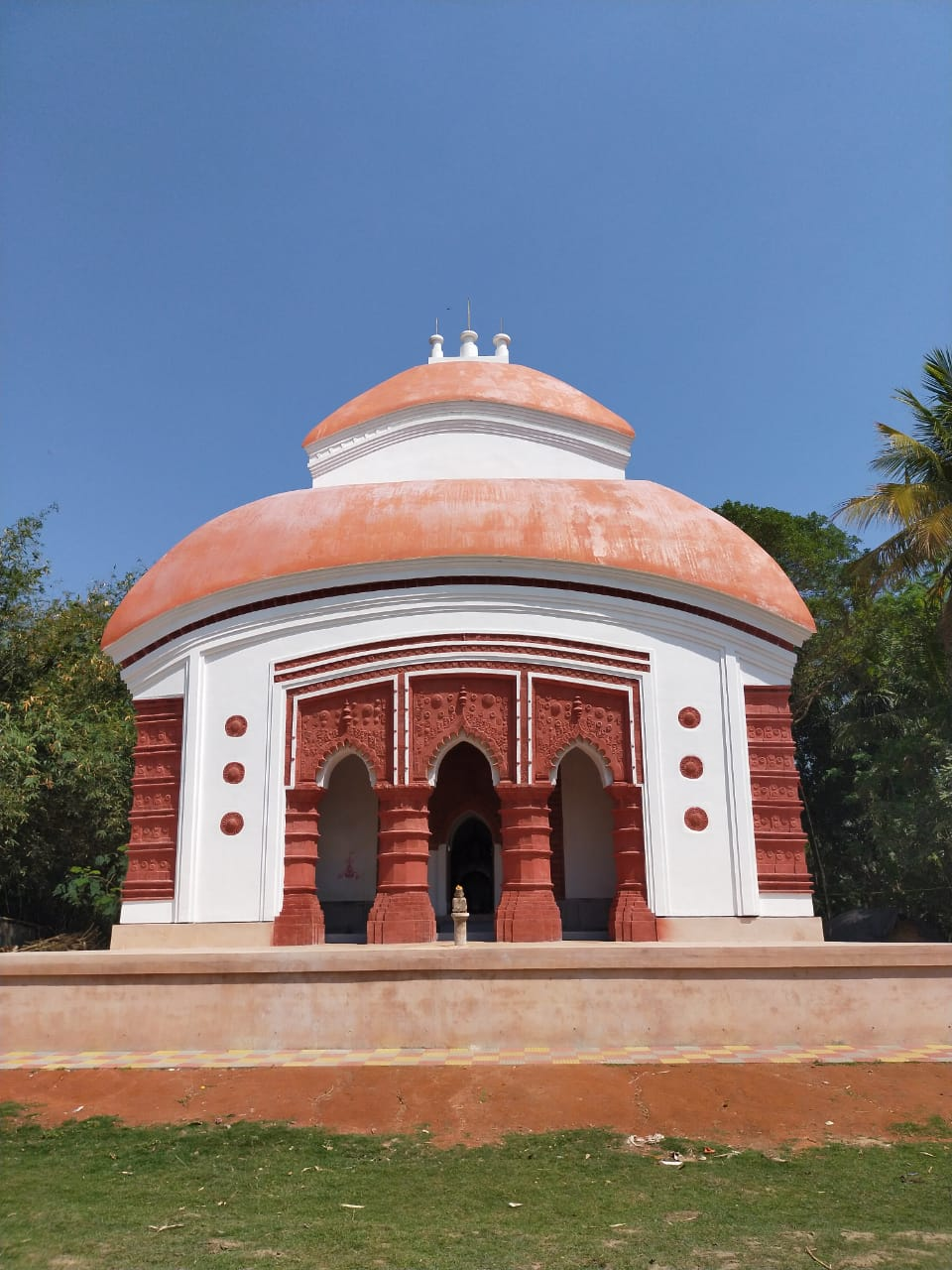
- Madangopal Jiu Temple

- Location in West Bengal

Religion
- Affiliation: Hinduism
- Deity: Radha and Madangopala: Janmastami; Dol Yatra

Location
- Location: Mellak
- State: West Bengal
- Country: India
- Coordinates: 22.4668°N 87.9057°E

Architecture
- Type: Ratna Style

Specifications
- Temple: 1
- Monument: 1

Madangopal Jiu Temple is a Hindu temple in the village of Mellak, in Howrah district.

== Architecture ==
One of the largest "ath-chala" temples in West Bengal, characterised by its roof with eight slopes.
