= Kulgachia =

- Village
- Location in West Bengal, India
- Coordinates: 22.46°N 88.00°E
- Country: India
- State: West Bengal
- District: Howrah
- Elevation: 4 m (13 ft)

Population (2001)
  - Total: 149,249

Languages
  - Official: Bengali, English
- Time zone: UTC+5:30 (IST)
- Postal code: 711306

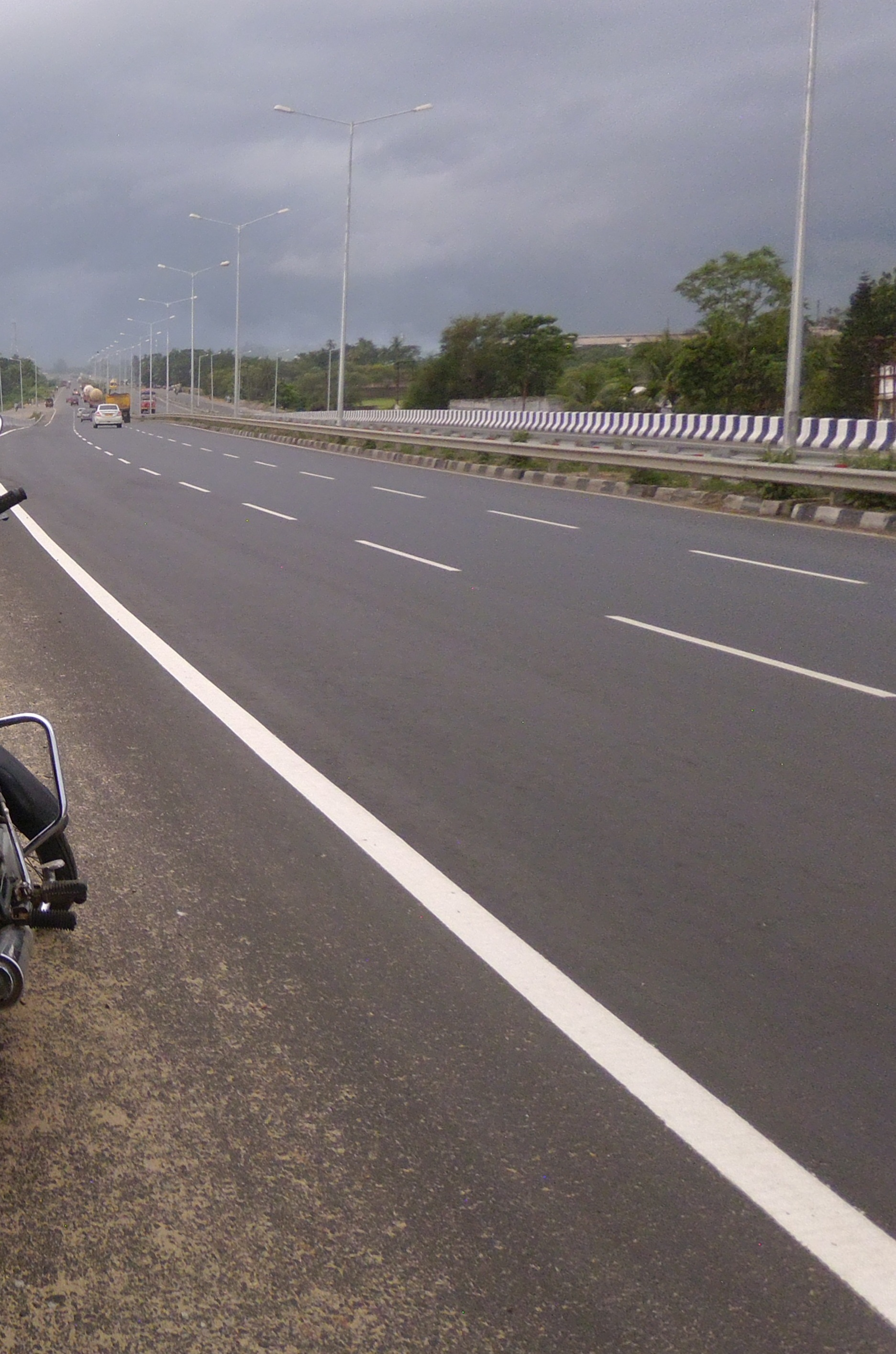
Tulsiberia More, 2012

Kulgachia is a village of Howrah district in the state West Bengal, India. The rail station located at the center of the town is only 40 km from howrah station and NH6 is only about 500 meter from the station area. Over the last five years it has been changed, developed and grown drastically to a town from village life though it is under panchayet raj administrative system yet. Populations are dramatically increased here nowadays due to the good communication with Kolkata, Kharagpur and other economically important parts of the state West Bengal.

== Infrastructure ==
Notable transportation networks include the Southeastern Railway, NH6, and Damodar. The Orissa Trunk Road is the main road and passes through the heart of the town. It connects to National Highway No-6, the Bombay Road.

Kulgachia has a railroad station.

Beside the station area there are two markets popularly known as Kulgachia super market and Ramkrisha market. Both of the markets have different types of shops, including a number of pharmacies. Chandipur Block Primary Health Centre popularly known as Chandipur hospital is only 1.5 kilometres (0.93 mi) from the station.

== Geography ==
Kulgachia is located in the eastern part of India. It has an average elevation of 4 m (13 ft). It is situated close to the Damodar River.

Since it is an unplanned Panchayat town, it has been known to suffer from drainage problems during periods of heavy rain. Other persistent issues include erosion caused by the Damodar river and encroachment.

== Demographics ==
The Kulgachia area is estimated to have a population of 30,778.

== Bus routes ==
- Kulgachia-Serampore
- Esplanade-Bagnan Calcutta Tramways Company
- Esplanade-Shyampur
- Bagnan-Burdwan
- Bagnan-Science City
- Bagnan-Park Circus
- Bagnan-Sinthee More
- Bagnan-Barasat
- Bagnan-Bidhannagar
- Bagnan-Sealdah
- Bagnan-Ruby crossing
- Bagnan-Shyambazar
- Howrah-Bakshi
- Howrah-Digha
- Howrah-Ghatal
- Howrah-Chandrakona Road

== Colleges ==
- OmDayal Group of Institutions
- Vivekananda Ramakrishna Mission B.Ed. College

== Schools ==
- Srikrishnapur Chittaranjan High School
- Ideal Public School
- Pirpur JUC Institute
- Joargori High School
- Netaji Balika vidyalaya
- Kamina High School

== KG Schools ==
- Shishu Siksha Niketan
- Children's Academy
- Ankur
- Vivekananda KG School
- Adhyayan Public School
