= Sarat Chandra Kuthi =

House of Sarat Chandra Chattopadhyay in Samta, Howrah district

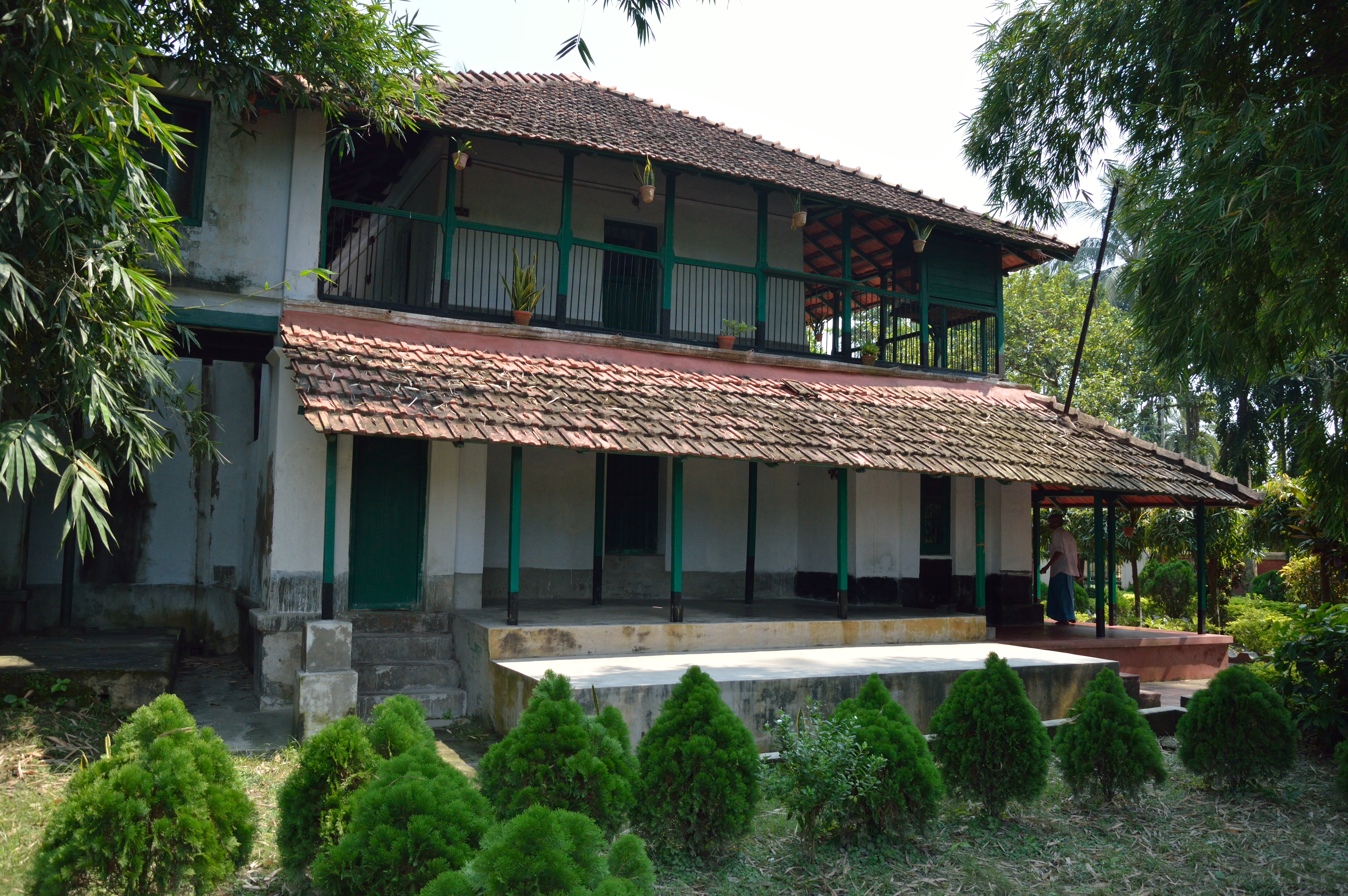
The house of Bengali novelist, Sarat Chandra Chattopadhyay, in the village of Samta

Sarat Chandra Kuthi (pronounced [ʃɔrot tʃɔndro kuʈʰi]), also known as Sarat Smriti Mandir (pronounced [ʃɔrot sriti mondir]), is a house museum located in the village of Samta, in the Howrah district of West Bengal, India, on the banks of the Rupnarayan river. It is noted for being the house of Bengali novelist, Sarat Chandra Chattopadhyay for twelve years. The house was constructed in the year 1923 by a local worker named Gopal Das and it cost a sum of ₹17,000. During the 1978 West Bengal floods, the structure had suffered damage, following which the government undertook its repair. Sarat Chandra Kuthi is a heritage-historical site protected under the West Bengal Heritage Commission Act (IX) of 2001. Sarat Chandra Chattopadhyay's works such as Devdas, Baikunther Will (Baikuntha's Will), Dena Paona (Debts and Dividends), Datta (Bethroed), and Nishkriti (Deliverance) among others were serialised during his stay at Sarat Chandra Kuthi. He also wrote Ramer Sumati and Mahesh among others during his stay in the house.

== History ==
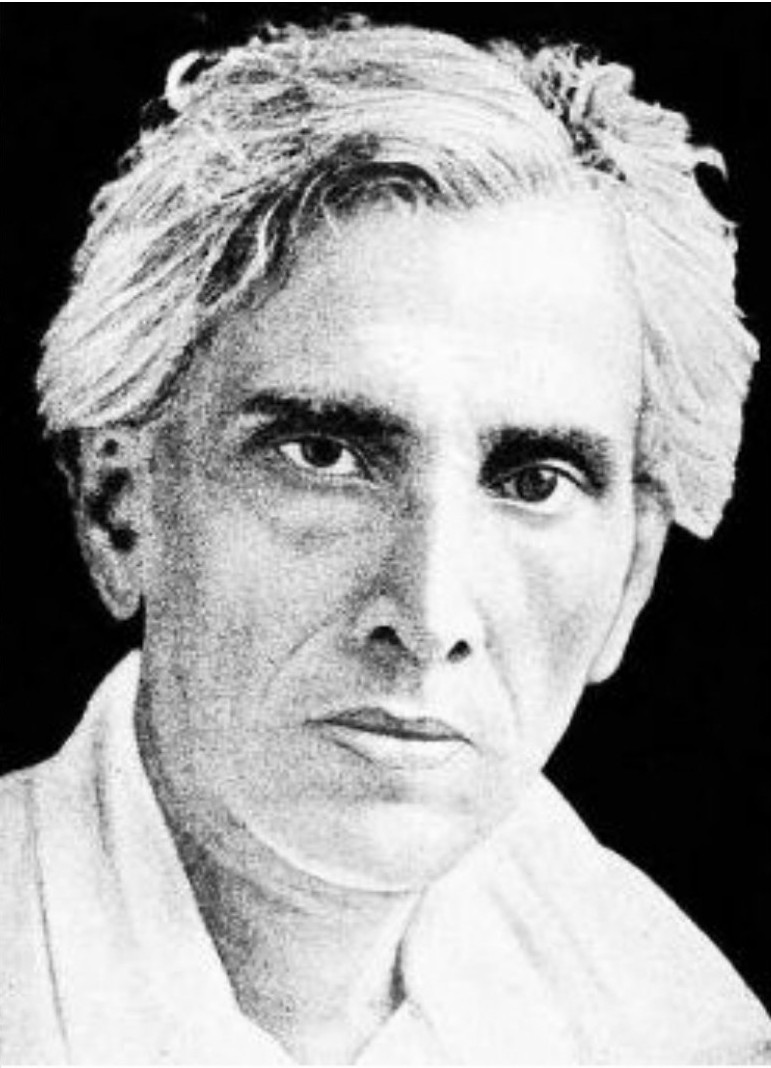
Sarat Chandra Chattopadhyay (1876–1938)

The plot for Sarat Chandra Kuthi in Samta was bought by Sarat Chandra Chattopadhyay in 1919, at a sum of ₹1,100. Samta was close to the village of Panitras and to his sister's home. Construction of the house began in 1923, and was done by local worker Gopal Das; Sarat Chandra had moved in by February 1923. He fenced his area and added ponds and paddy fields adjacent to his house; following which he renamed the area Samtaber. A total sum of ₹17,000 was spent on the construction.

Sarat Chandra Chattopadhyay lived in Sarat Chandra Kuthi for twelve years, until moving to Calcutta. Earlier, the course of the Rupnarayan river was much closer to the house.

Sarat Chandra's works such as Devdas, Baikunther Will (Baikuntha's Will), Dena Paona (Debts and Dividends), Datta (Bethroed), and Nishkriti (Deliverance) among others were published in Bharatbarsha during the years he lived in Samta, following which they were published as books by Gurudas Chattopadhyay and Sons, and M. C. Sarkar and Sons. He also wrote Ramer Sumati and Mahesh among others during his years in Samta. Upon moving to the village, Sarat Chandra initially faced resentment from conservative elders and influential men for his bold stories, mingling with lower caste people, and for being an "outsider". It was after he started helping those in need, helped in setting up an education institution, and his legacy as a novelist grew that they warmed up to him.

The two-storied Burmese-style house was also home to Sarat Chandra's second wife, Hironmoyee Debi, and his brother, Swami Vedananda, who was a disciple at Belur Math. All of their samadhis are in the gardens of the house. Trees such as bamboo and guava planted by the novelist stand in the gardens surrounding the house.

Parts of the house, such as the mud-walled kitchen, had collapsed and the house was damaged in the 1978 West Bengal floods. The Zilla Parishad repaired the house, and it was declared a heritage-historical site under the West Bengal Heritage Commission Act (IX) of 2001. In 2009, the house was renovated and preservation of the novelist's personal belongings was also undertaken.

== Gallery ==
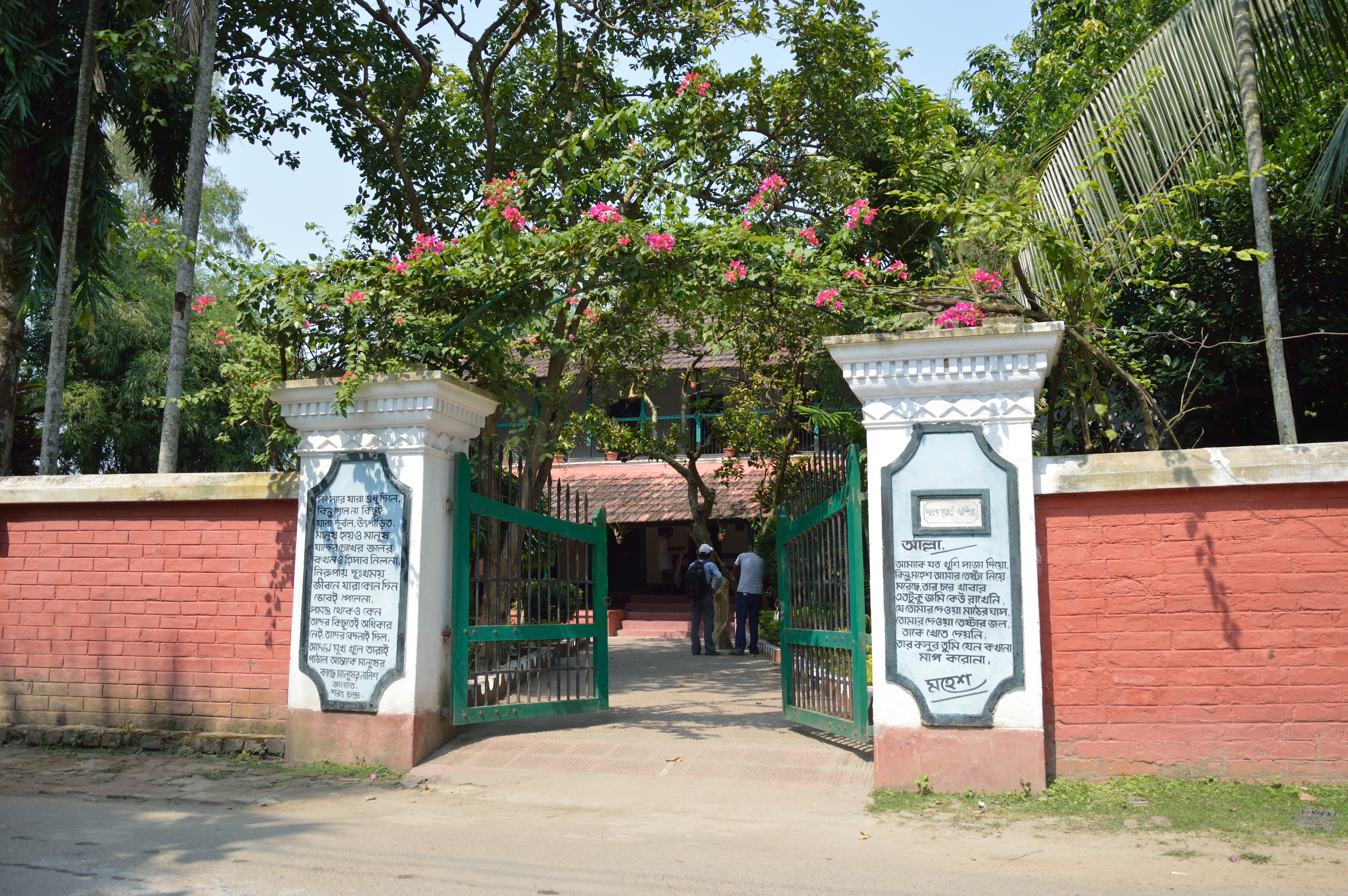
Entrance to the house

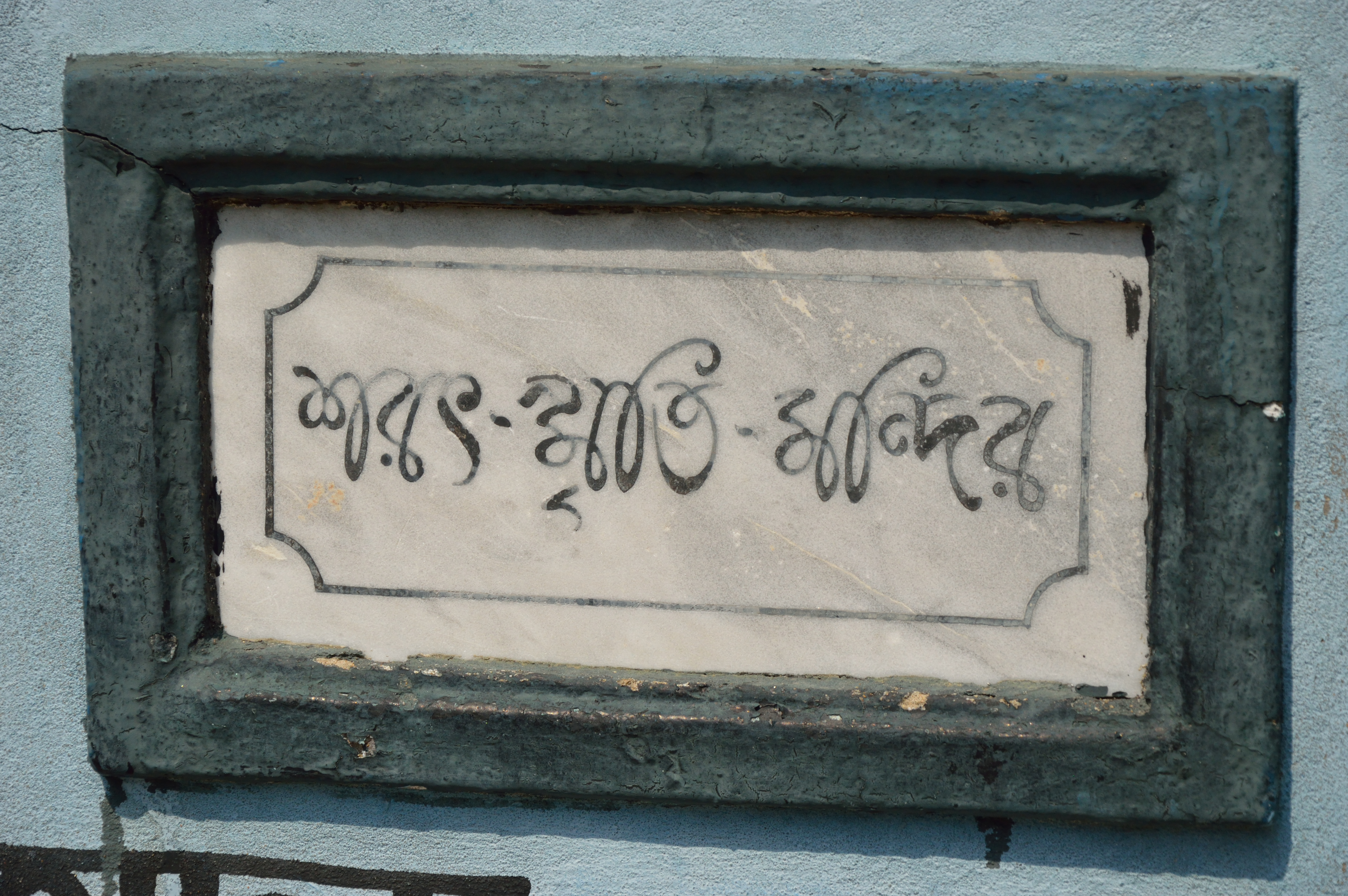
Plaque at the entrance, reading 'Sarat Smriti Mandir'

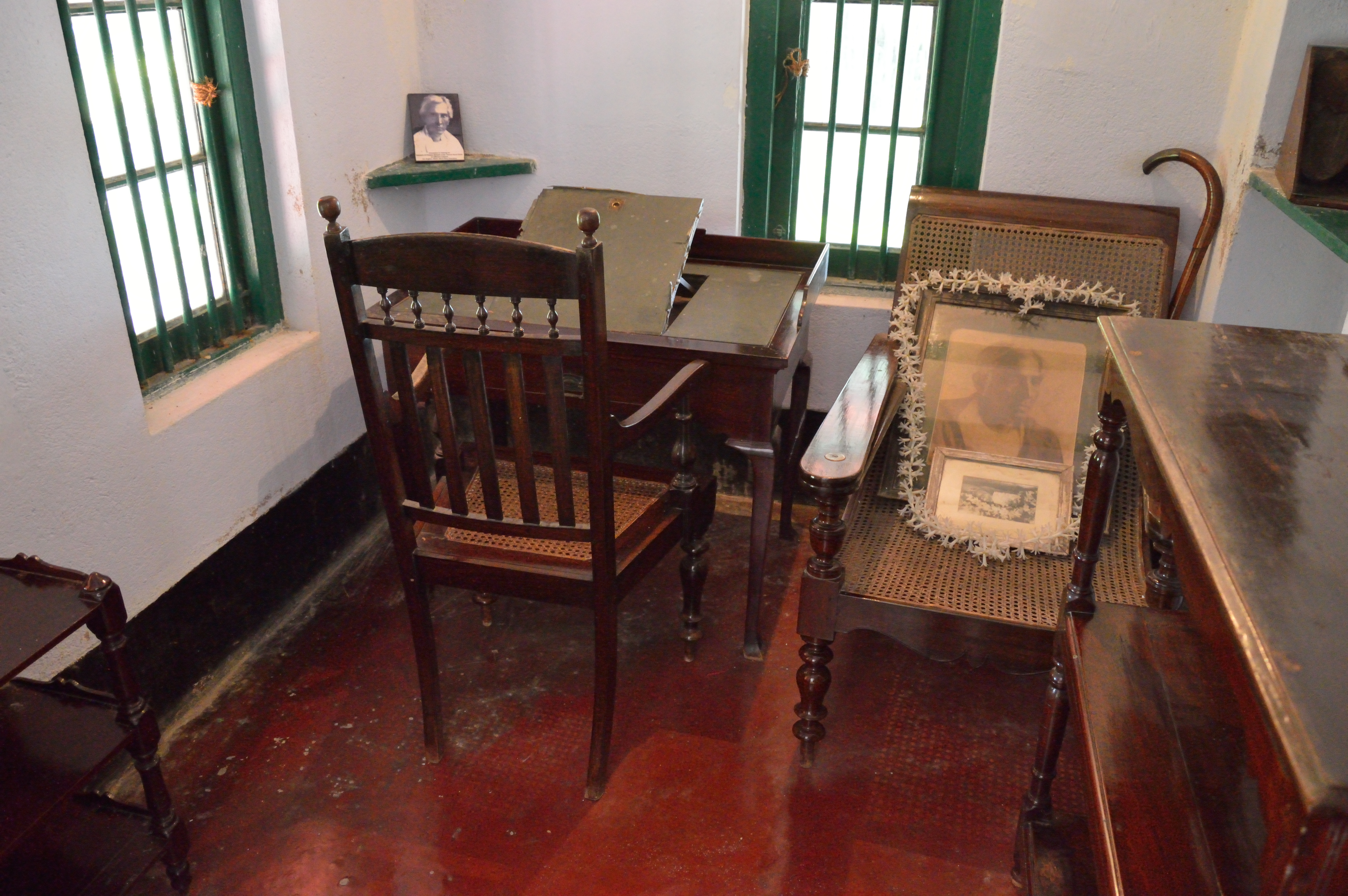
Study room

Ground-floor corridor

First-floor corridor-verandah

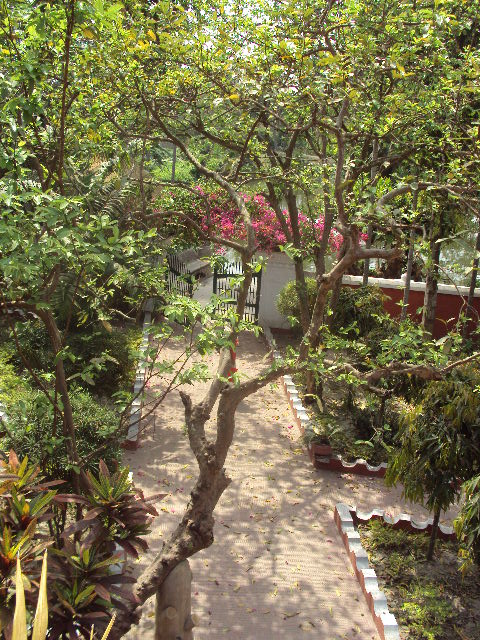
Garden of the house, with trees planted by the novelist

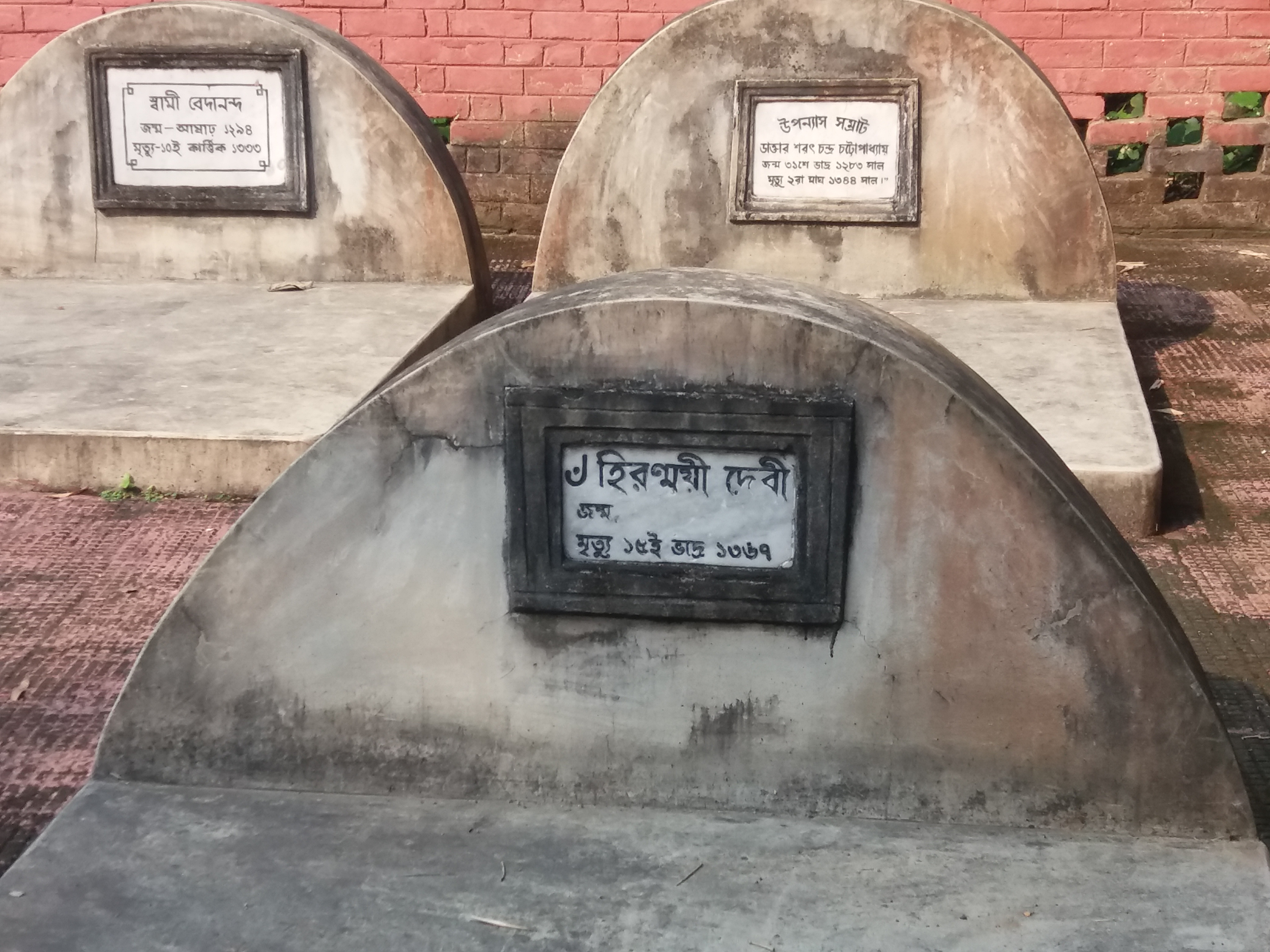
Samadhis of Sarat Chandra, his brother, and his second wife, Hironmoyee Debi

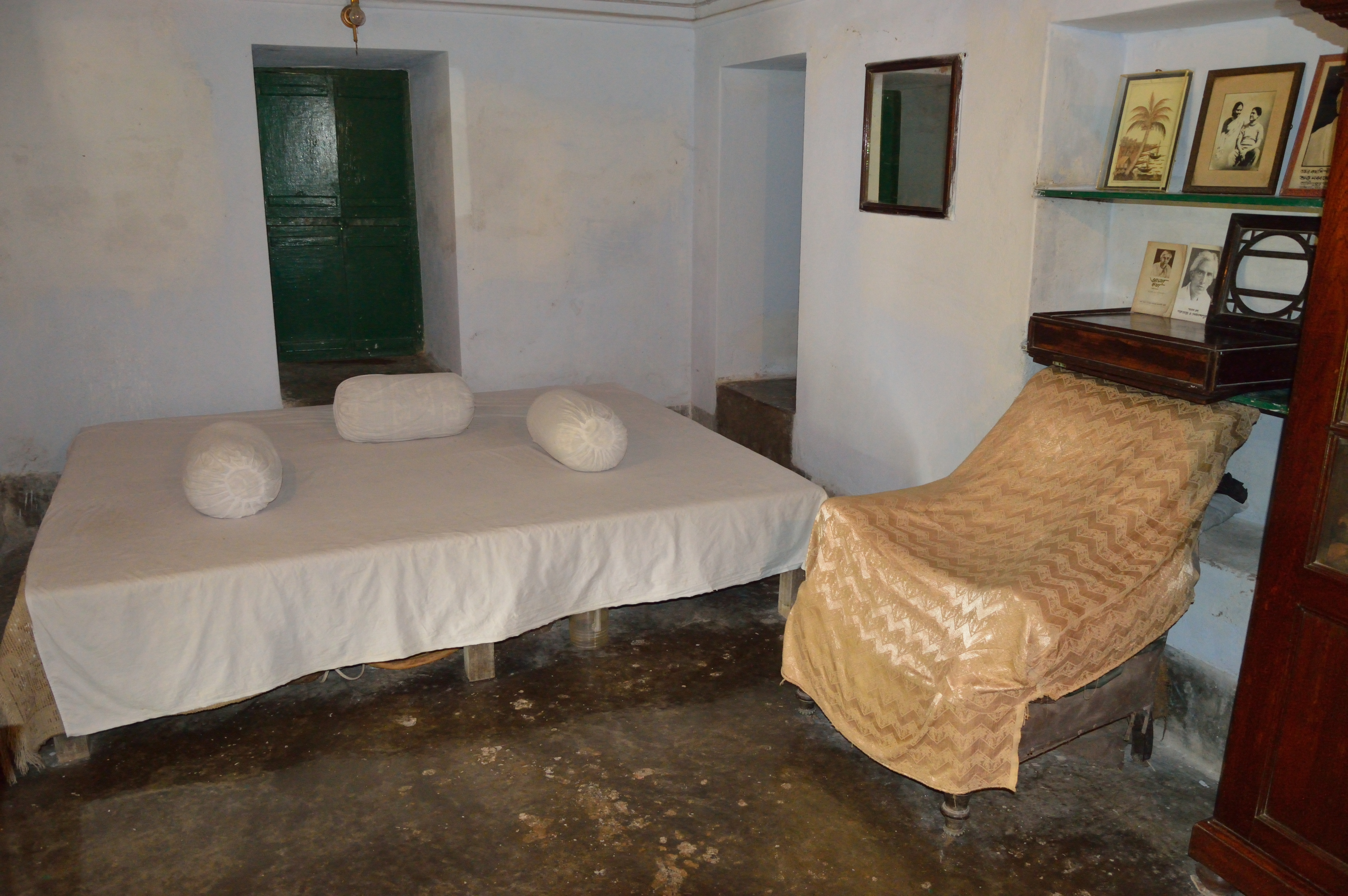
A room inside the house

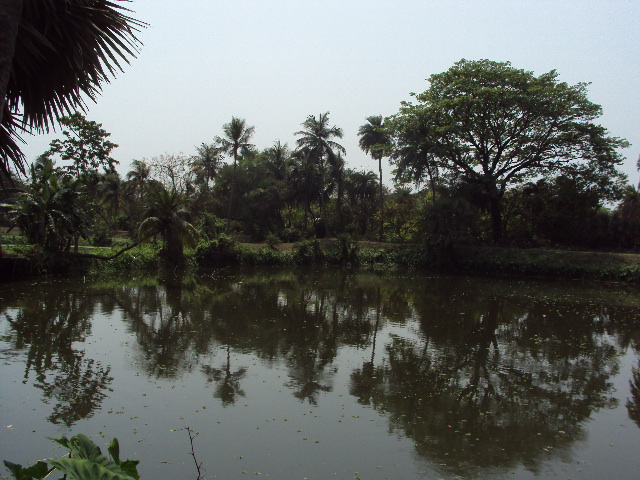
Pond opposite the house

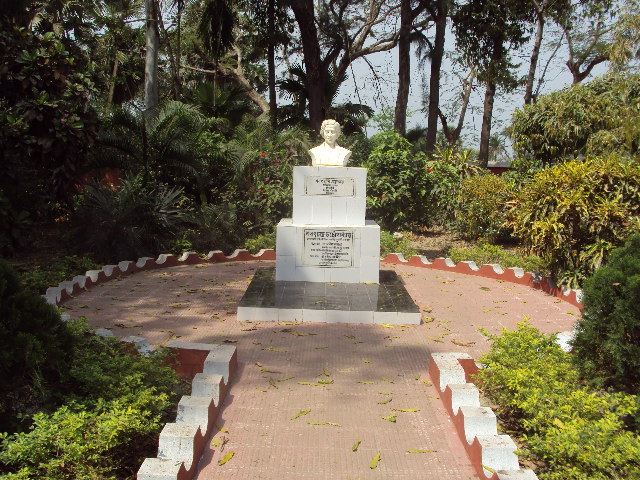
Statue of the novelist, in the house's gardens

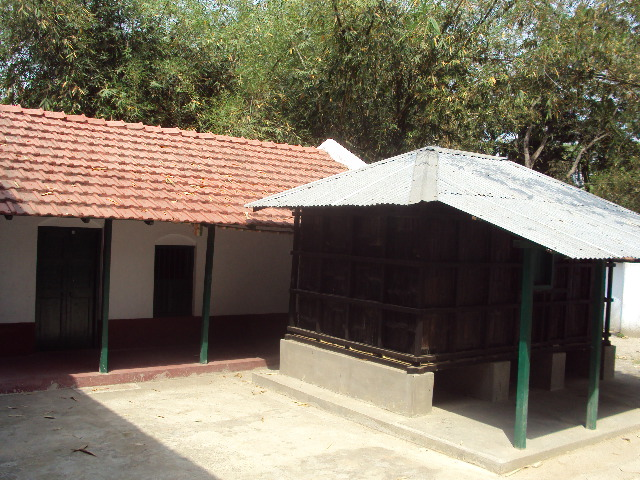
Mud-walled kitchen
