= Abhhiman =

2026 Indian Bengali-language drama film

- Theatrical release poster
- Directed by: Indraadip Dasgupta
- Screenplay by: Srijato Bandopadhyay
- Produced by: Jisshu U Sengupta; Saurav Das
- Starring: Prosenjit Chatterjee; Jisshu U Sengupta; Subhashree Ganguly; Kanchan Mullick
- Cinematography: Pratip Mukherjee
- Edited by: Sujay Datta Ray
- Music by: Indraadip Dasgupta
- Production company: Why So Serious Films
- Distributed by: PVR Inox Pictures
- Release date: June 19, 2026 (India)
- Running time: 144 minutes
- Country: India
- Language: Bengali

Abhhiman (transl. Pride) is a 2026 Indian Bengali-language musical drama film directed by Indraadip Dasgupta. The film stars Prosenjit Chatterjee, Jisshu Sengupta, Subhashree Ganguly and Kanchan Mullick. It is produced by Jisshu U Sengupta and Saurav Das under the banner Why So Serious Films.

The film was released theatrically on 19 June 2026.

== Plot ==
The film follows Akash Chatterjee, a once-prominent musician who has withdrawn from public life and is living with dementia. His estranged son, Rishi, returns with unresolved resentment and a desire to reconnect with him. Their meeting is complicated by Akash's fading memory and by the emotional presence of Shree, who remains close to Akash as the family confronts the weight of old wounds, affection and unfinished relationships.

== Cast ==
- Prosenjit Chatterjee as Akash Chatterjee
- Jisshu Sengupta as Rishi Chatterjee
- Subhashree Ganguly as Shree
- Kanchan Mullick
- Sohini Sarkar (special appearance)

== Production ==
Abhhiman was formally announced at a mahurat ceremony in Kolkata on 26 February 2026. The event was attended by members of the cast and crew, including Prosenjit Chatterjee, Subhashree Ganguly, Jisshu U Sengupta, Indraadip Dasgupta, Srijato Bandopadhyay, Saurav Das and Kanchan Mullick. A motion poster of the film was also released at the event.

According to Sangbad Pratidin, the screenplay and dialogues were written by Srijato Bandopadhyay, and the film was scheduled to begin shooting in Kolkata on 5 March 2026. The Wall described the film at the time of announcement as a relationship drama involving love, distance and emotional conflict.

In April 2026, Anandabazar Patrika reported that the makers temporarily postponed the remaining five days of shooting following the death of actor Rahul Arunoday Banerjee. Jisshu U Sengupta, Saurav Das and director Indraadip Dasgupta said that the team was not in a position to continue shooting immediately.

== Music and promotion ==
The film's music was composed by Indraadip Dasgupta. The music and trailer launch was held in June 2026 at a city studio. The Times of India reported that the event was attended by members of the cast and crew, including Prosenjit Chatterjee, Jisshu U Sengupta, Subhashree Ganguly, Kanchan Mullick, Indraadip Dasgupta and Srijato Bandopadhyay. The report also noted that the song "Ador" was written by Srijit Mukherji, who also shaped its melody.

Before the film's release, Jisshu U Sengupta and Subhashree Ganguly discussed the film and the idea of abhiman in an interview with Ei Samay.

== Release ==
Abhhiman was released in cinemas on 19 June 2026. BookMyShow listed the film as a Bengali-language drama, family and romantic film with a UA13+ rating and a runtime of 2 hours and 24 minutes.

== Reception ==
Souvik Saha of Cine Kolkata gave the film 3.5 out of 5 stars. The review praised the performances of Prosenjit Chatterjee, Jisshu U Sengupta and Subhashree Ganguly, and described the film as an emotional family drama about memory, love, regret and unresolved relationships. The review also noted pacing issues, an overabundance of songs and underdeveloped supporting characters.

The Times of India gave Abhhiman a rating of 3.5 out of 5 stars. The review by Raima Ganguly praised the film's exploration of memory, identity and fractured family relationships, highlighting the performances of Prosenjit Chatterjee and Subhashree Ganguly, as well as Indraadip Dasgupta's use of music as a narrative element. The review noted that while some emotional moments leaned into melodrama, the film was considered a thoughtful reflection on memory, absence and reconciliation.
