= Sourav Das =

Sourav Das or Saurav Das may refer to:

- Sourav Das (actor) (born 1989), Indian actor
- Sourav Das (footballer) (born 1996), Indian footballer
- Subhra Sourav Das (born 1988), Indian actor
- Saurav Das (political activist), Indian journalist and activist of the Cockroach Janta Party
