= Aloo =

Aloo may refer to:

== Food ==
- Aloo, an Indian term for potatoes, found in the names of a number of dishes:
  - Aloo chaat, dry potato snack
  - Aloo chokha, fried potatoes
  - Aloo chop, potato appetizer
  - Aloo gobi, potatoes and cauliflower
  - Aloo gosht, potatoes and meat in shorba
  - Aloo mutter, potatoes and peas in a spicy tomato sauce
  - Aloo paratha, an unleavened bread stuffed with mashed potatoes
  - Aloo pie, a fried pastry filled with potatoes and vegetables
  - Aloo pyri, potato curry and bread
  - Aloo tikki, deep fried potato patties with peas and spices
  - Dum aloo, fried potatoes with sauce
  - Saag aloo, fried potatoes with spinach (palak) or fenugreek (methi) curry

== People ==
- Aloo Jal Chibber (fl. 1970s), Indian politician from Maharashtra
- Paul Alo'o (born 1983), Cameroonian professional footballer
- Aloo, nickname of Indian film actress Alia Bhatt (born 1993)

== Other uses ==
- Chuck Aloo, a character in Late Night with Conan O'Brien parody segment "60", played by Andy Blitz
- Rex Aloo, a title referring to Coroticus, one of the kings of Strathclyde
- Aloo Chaat (film), 2009 Indian Hindi-language romantic comedy film

== See also ==
- Alu (disambiguation)
- Alo (disambiguation)
- Alou (disambiguation)
