= Alo =

Alo or ALO may refer to:

== Arts, entertainment and media ==
- Alo (film), a 2003 Bengali drama
- Alo Creevey, a fictional character in TV series Skins
  - "Alo" (Skins series 5)
  - "Alo" (Skins series 6)
- Animal Liberation Orchestra, an American rock band
- Alo!, a newspaper in Serbia

== People ==
- Alo (given name), an Estonian male name, including a list of people with the name
- Alo of Maui (born 1186), 6th Moi of Maui
- ALO (artist) (born 1981), London-based Italian artist
- Biyi Alo (born 1994), English rugby player
- Emmanuel Alo (born 1950), Nigerian biologist
- Jocelyn Alo (born 1998), American softball player
- William Nwankwo Alo (born 1965), Nigerian official

== Places ==
- Alo (Wallis and Futuna)
- Alo, Mardan, Khyber Pakhtunkhwa, Pakistan
- Ålo, Agder county, Norway

== Transportation ==
- Allegheny Airlines, ICAO code ALO
- Alloa railway station, in Clackmannanshire, Scotland, station code ALO
- Waterloo Regional Airport, in Iowa, U.S., IATA code ALO

== Other uses ==
- Alo TV, a local TV channel in Tartu, Estonia
- Alo Yoga, U.S. activewear company
- Air liaison officer
- Aluminium(II) oxide, symbol AlO
- Alo, the name in Turkey for laundry detergent Tide
- Afghanistan Liberation Organization
- Wakasihu language, ISO 639 language code alo
- H.K.C. ALO, a Dutch korfball team

== See also ==
- Aalo, a town in India
- Aalo (album), a 2011 album by Warfaze
- Alau, Nepal, a place
- Aloa, a genus of tiger moths
- Fernando Alonso (born 1981), Spanish racing driver
- Paul Alo'o (born 1983), Cameroonian footballer
