= Panskura =

- Town
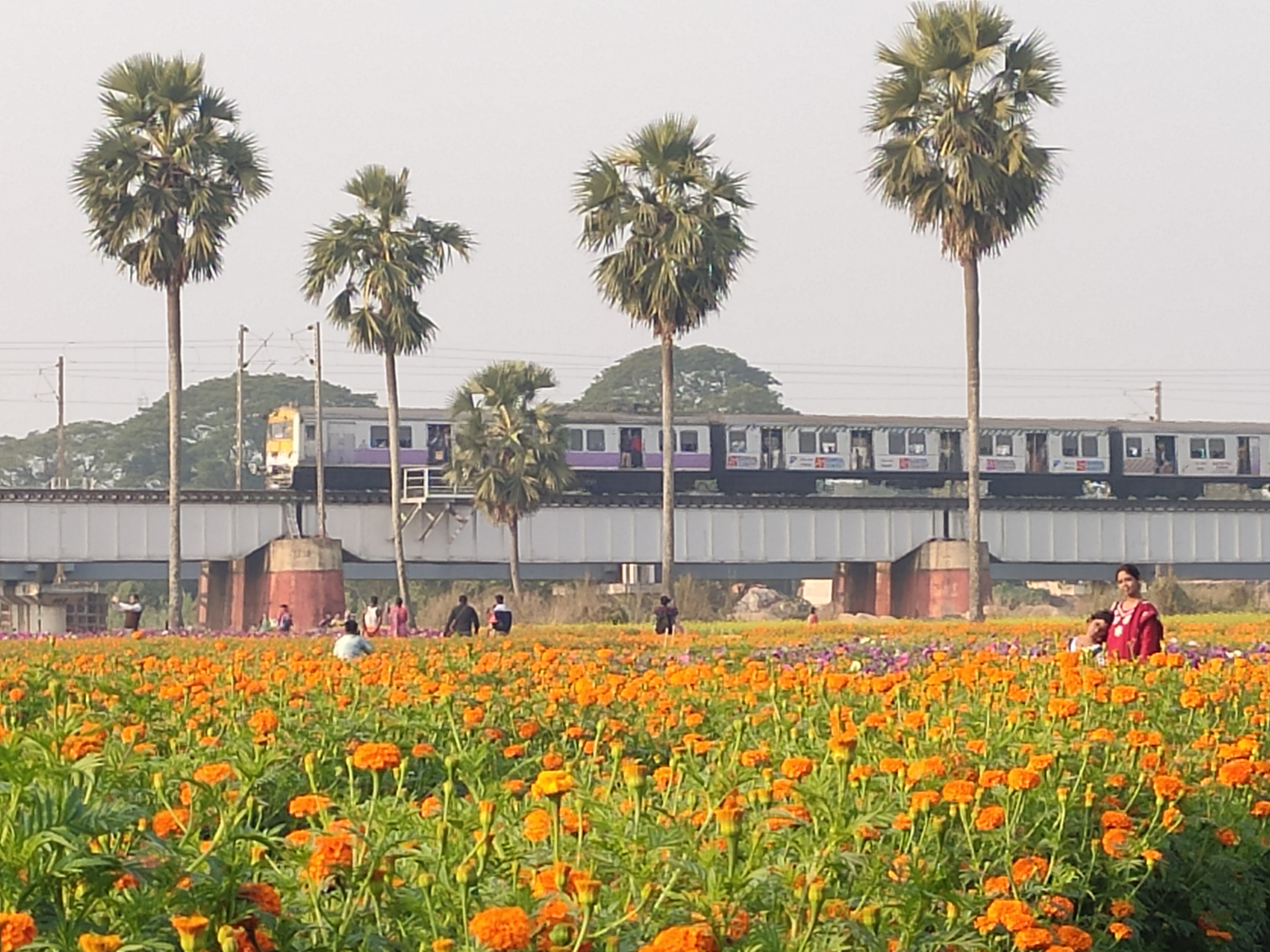
- Valley of Flowers in Panskura CD block

- Location in West Bengal, India Panskura (India)
- Coordinates: 22.417°N 87.700°E
- Country: India
- State: West Bengal
- District: Purba Medinipur

Government
  - Type: Municipality
  - Body: Panskura Municipality; Haldia Development Authority

Area
  - Total: 17.04 km^{2} (6.58 sq mi)
- Elevation: 7 m (23 ft)

Population (2011)
  - Total: 57,932
  - Density: 3,400/km^{2} (8,805/sq mi)

Languages
  - Official: English, Bengali
- Time zone: UTC+5:30 (IST)
- Pin code: 721139
- Lok Sabha constituency: Ghatal
- Vidhan Sabha constituency: Panskura Paschim
- Avg. summer temperature: 38 °C (100 °F)
- Avg. winter temperature: 9 °C (48 °F)
- Website: panskuramunicipality.org purbamedinipur.gov.in

Panskura is a town and municipality in Purba Medinipur district in the Indian state of West Bengal. It is situated on the river bank of Kangsabati Kangsabati River (variously known as Kasai and Cossye).

== Etymology ==
- According to many references, the name Panskura have been originated from the word "Panchkoora". The king of Kasijora once gave some land to the poet Nityanand Chakrabarty at the time of his 'Diksha'. This evidence is found in the book of Manikram Gangopadhyay's 'Shitala Mangal' – 'Panchakurya jami dilo karya bramhottar'. The meaning of 'Pancha' is five and 'kurya' means the amount of land situated in a river valley. It is actually a Persi term. The name 'Panskura' has come from this 'Panchakurya' through evolution. Like the term Kenjakura in Bankura which is also a place situated near a river Dwarkeswar.
- The East India Irrigation and Canal Company, in 1852, dug Midnapur Canal for the cultivation, communication and trade from Uluberia to Mohanpur,. According to Regional History researcher Shyamal Bera, "The steamers transported through the Midnapore canal and came to Kangsabati (now South Gopalpur Mouza) and used to throw 'Pans' [ashes] and collects 'Kura' [fuel]. Since then, the name of the area seems to have been formed into Panskua [Pans+Kura]."
- There is a mention of 'Punchcoora School' in English at Panskura Bradley Birt High School's guards' badge which was established in 1864 at Sadarghat, Panskura. In addition, during the British period, the collector Bailey Sahib of Midnapore told about Kansabati coastal area in his written 'Memoranda of Midnapur' in 1852. This area is referred to as 'Panchkura Ghat'. Later, the name of the entire Kasijora pargana was changed to the name of Panskura. Panskura Ghat does not exist anymore. However, the area adjoining lock-gate which was built 1896 is still known as Sadar Ghat. The present-day Old Panskura was formed adjoining the area of Sadar Ghat.
- According to some people the name of Panskura came from Pashangara. Because of irrigation in the past, Lockh-gate or 'Pashang' was built in this area of Midnapore Canal. The place adjacent to the lock-gate was called 'Pashangara'. The name 'Panskura' came from this 'Pasangara'.

== Geography ==
Cities and towns in Tamluk subdivision of Purba Medinipur district
M: municipal city/ town, CT: census town, R: rural/ urban centre, H: historical/ religious centre
Owing to space constraints in the small map, the actual locations in a larger map may vary slightly

=== Location ===
Panskura is located at 22.42°N 87.7°E. It has an average elevation of 7 metres (26 feet). It is situated on the NH6 on the way from Kolkata to Kharagpur.

== Climate ==
The climate follows a hot tropical monsoon weather pattern. Summers last from mid-April to mid-June with diurnal highs ranging from the upper 30s °C to the mid-40s °C and lows in the low 30s°C in the winter. In summer daily heat is often followed by evening rains known as kalboishakhis or dust-storms (loo). Monsoon rains can last from mid-June to late August with rains from the southeast monsoon contributing the lion's share of the annual rainfall of around 1600 mm. Winters last for 2 to 3 months and are mild; typical lows are from 6 °C – 14 °C. Panskura has considerably lesser particulate pollution due its comparatively lesser and satisfactory air quality index.

== Urbanisation ==
94.08% of the population of Tamluk subdivision live in the rural areas. Only 5.92% of the population live in the urban areas, and that is the second-lowest proportion of urban population amongst the four subdivisions in Purba Medinipur district, just above Egra subdivision.

Note: The map alongside presents some of the notable locations in the subdivision. All places marked in the map are linked in the larger full screen map.

== Demographics ==
As per 2011 Census of India Panskura had a total population of 57,932 of which 29,740 (51%) were males and 28,192 (49%) were females. Population below 6 years was 6,943. The total number of literates in Panskura was 43,326 (84.97% of the population over 6 years).

=== Languages ===
Languages spoken in Panskura (2011)
1. Bengali (91.3%)
2. Hindi (4.20%)
3. Urdu (2.30%)
4. Santali (0.50%)
5. Others (0.20%)
6. 1.50%

== Police station ==
Panskura police station has jurisdiction over Panskura (municipality) and Panskura CD Block. Panskura police station covers an area of 285 km^{2} with a population of 350,000.

== Economy ==
The livelihood of the common people is dependent on Business/Job/Agriculture. Many varieties of flowers and green vegetable are grown and are supplied to Kolkata from here. Local vegetable wholesale market is the main trade of this town. This vegetable market is the 2nd largest market in West Bengal. The first governmental cold storage & market for flower is situated at Panskura.

=== Panskura Bazaar ===
A large portion of the local population are farmers. Vegetables produced by farmers come to the bazaar, a busy and large wholesale market. It is the supply line for the vegetable markets of Kolkata and its outskirts. The bazaar is also well connected by train and road (NH6) to Kolkata which is the nearest big city. Local trains of South Eastern Line are frequent. Kharagpur, Haldia and Digha train connection is also available here.

== Cuisine ==
Panskura is famous for its popular Panskurar Chop (Panskurar aloor chop) made out of boiled potatoes, besan (gram flour) (khaasareer daal) and various spices. It is popular for its famous muger jilipi.

== Education ==
- British English Institute Panskura (Spoken English learning center where teachers are foreigners)
- Panskura Banamali College Autonomous (both undergraduate and postgraduate degree in arts and science) is the sole institution of higher education.
- Siddhinath Mahavidyalaya
- Panskura Bradley Birt High School is the oldest (1864) and the reputed school of the area.
- Gopalpur is the second oldest (1910) school in this area.
- Panskura Gandhi Vidyapith
- Raghunathbari Ramtarak High School which is also the third oldest (1915)
- Panskura Girls' High School (1938)
- Bakulda High School (1945)
- Vidyasagar Nursery School (1990)
- Mechogram Purnachandra Balika Vidyayatan (1972)
- Dhuliapur Pallishree Bani Mandir (1939)
- Shyam Sundarpur Patna High School (1952)
- Pratappore High School (1962)
- Bhogpur K. M. High School (1946)
- Dhuliara Mahendra Institution
- Jamia Islamia Mazahirul Uloom Madrasha (1975)
- Gopalnagar B. L. Vidhyapith
- IDAN Teachers Training College
- Rashbehari College Of Education
- Panskura Primary Teachers' Training Institute
- Vivekjyoti College
- Sahid Khudiram College Of Education
- Champadali High School H.S (1971)
- Ramchandrapur Raisuddin high school
- Maguri Jagannath Chak High School
- Harinarayan Chak Vidamandir.
- Kumarpur Hateswar High School [Gov. Sponsored], Estd- 5 Feb 1947
- Usatpur soudamini Vidya Mandir (H.S)- (1965)

== Health ==
There is a Government Super Speciality Hospital and a Private Super Speciality Hospital and some Private Nursing Homes in Panskura. People of this area mainly depend on that hospitals and nursing homes.

- Bengal Doctors ( Health care provider company )
- Panskura Super Speciality Hospital ( Governmental )
- Baroma Sirona Hospital ( Super Speciality )
- Jivandeep Nursing Home
- IDAN Nursing Home
- Subhalaxmi Nursing Home
- Mother Teresa Nursing Home
- New Mother Teresa Nursing Home
- Life Care Nursing Home
- Vivekananda Nursing Home
- Astha Nursing Home
- Ashalata Nursing Home

== Tourism ==
Panskura CD block is known for its Valley of Flowers, Kingdom of Flower and Gladiolas garden which is situated near Khirai railway station and Kansabati river. The river Kansabati is a good picnic spot and Bhavatarini Shmashanpith Kali Temple nearby old Panskura bazar is a pilgrimage spot. Gosaibaba Samadhi Mandir and Begunbari Kali Temple in Khirai are also a popular pilgrimage spot.

== Transportation ==
Panskura is well connected by train and road (NH16) to Kolkata which is the nearest big city. Local trains of South Eastern Line are frequently available at Panskura railway station. Kharagpur, Haldia and Digha train connection are also available.

Kolkata is also well connected to Panskura by NH 16. Local buses, Trakers, Toto and private taxis also play a major role of transportation to more interior villages from there. SH 4 passes through Panskura.

Panskura is well connected to Ghatal by bus from Panskura bus stand and bus from Kolkata to Ghatal is also have to pass from panskura near machogram. Panskura is also connected to district town Tamluk by bus & train.

== Panskura picture gallery ==
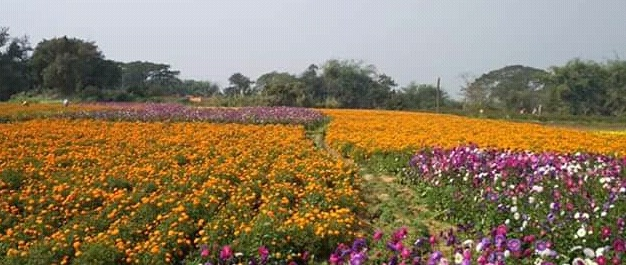
Valley of Flowers in Pansura

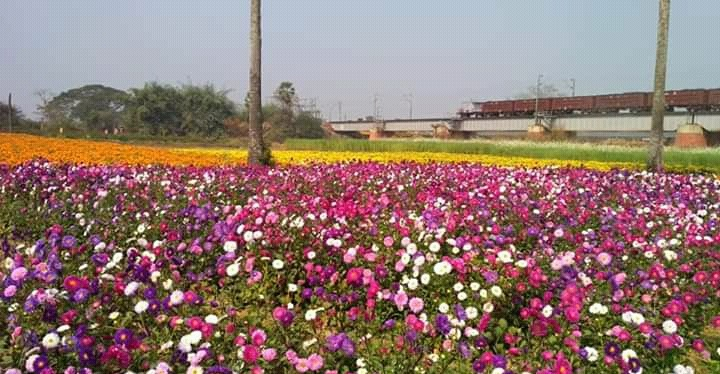
Valley of Flowers in Panskura

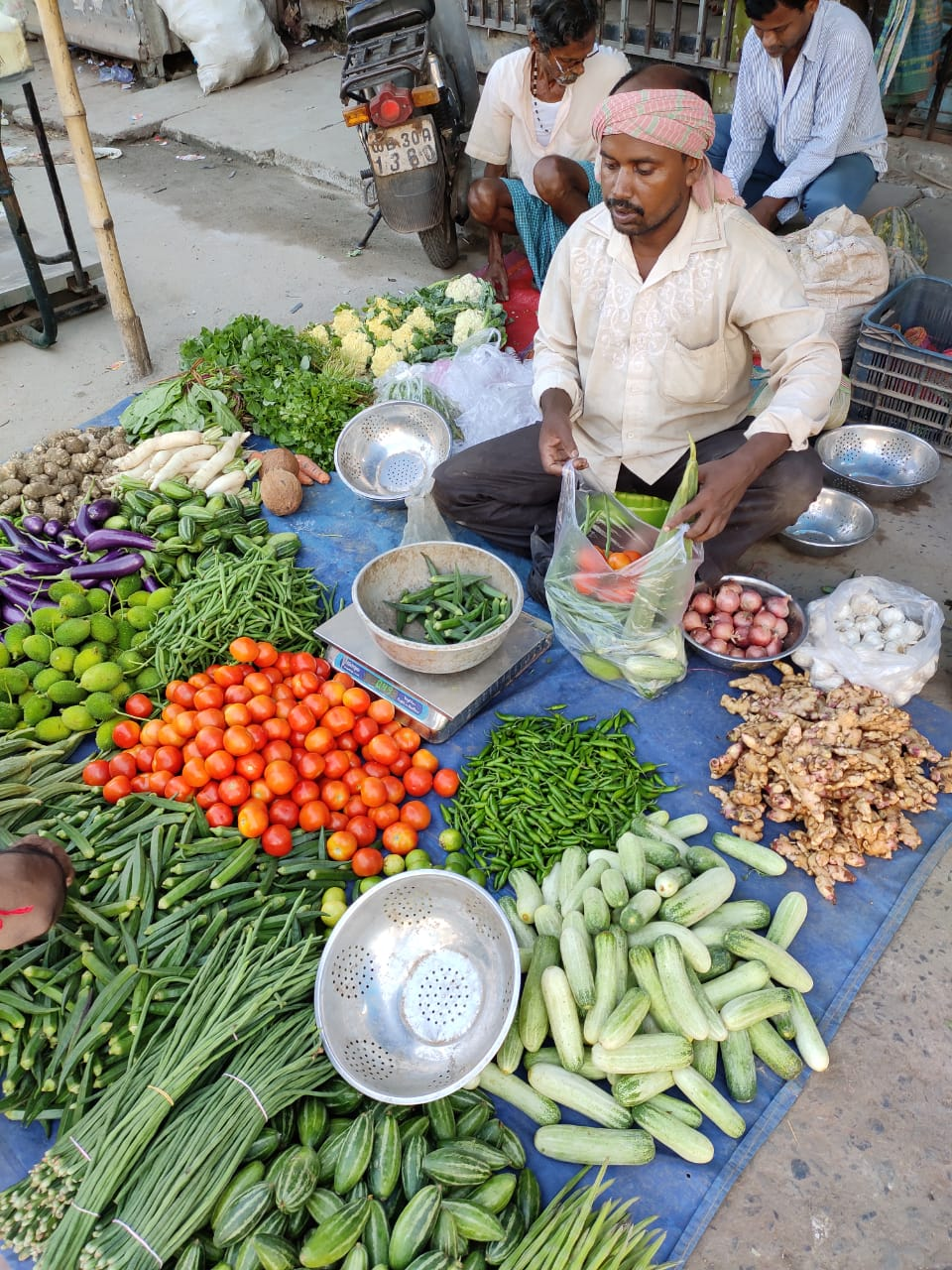
Panskura Station Sobji Bazar seller

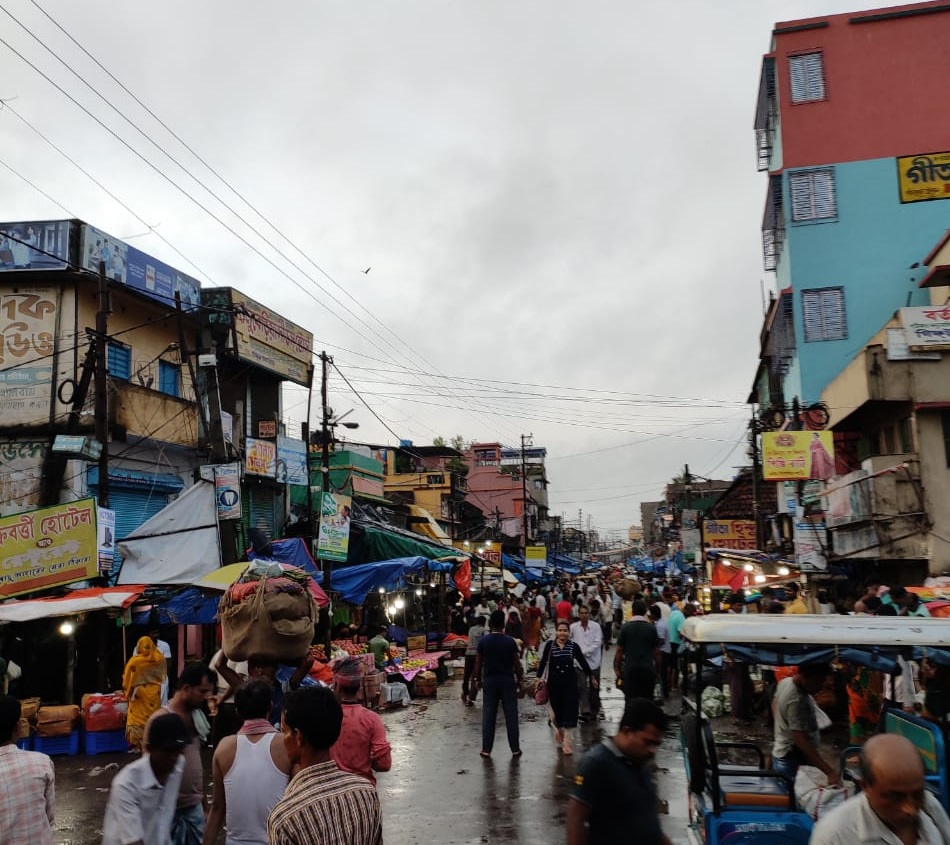
Panskura Station Sobji Bazar

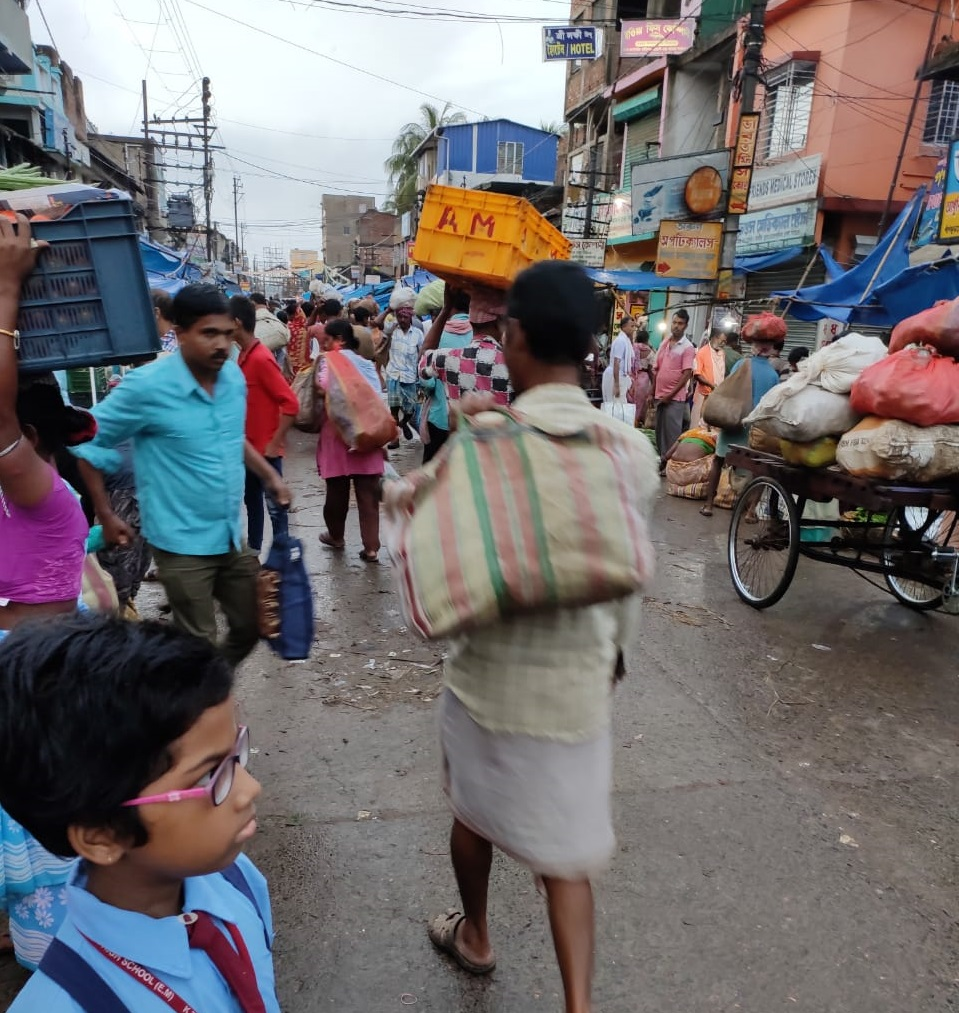
Panskura Station Road

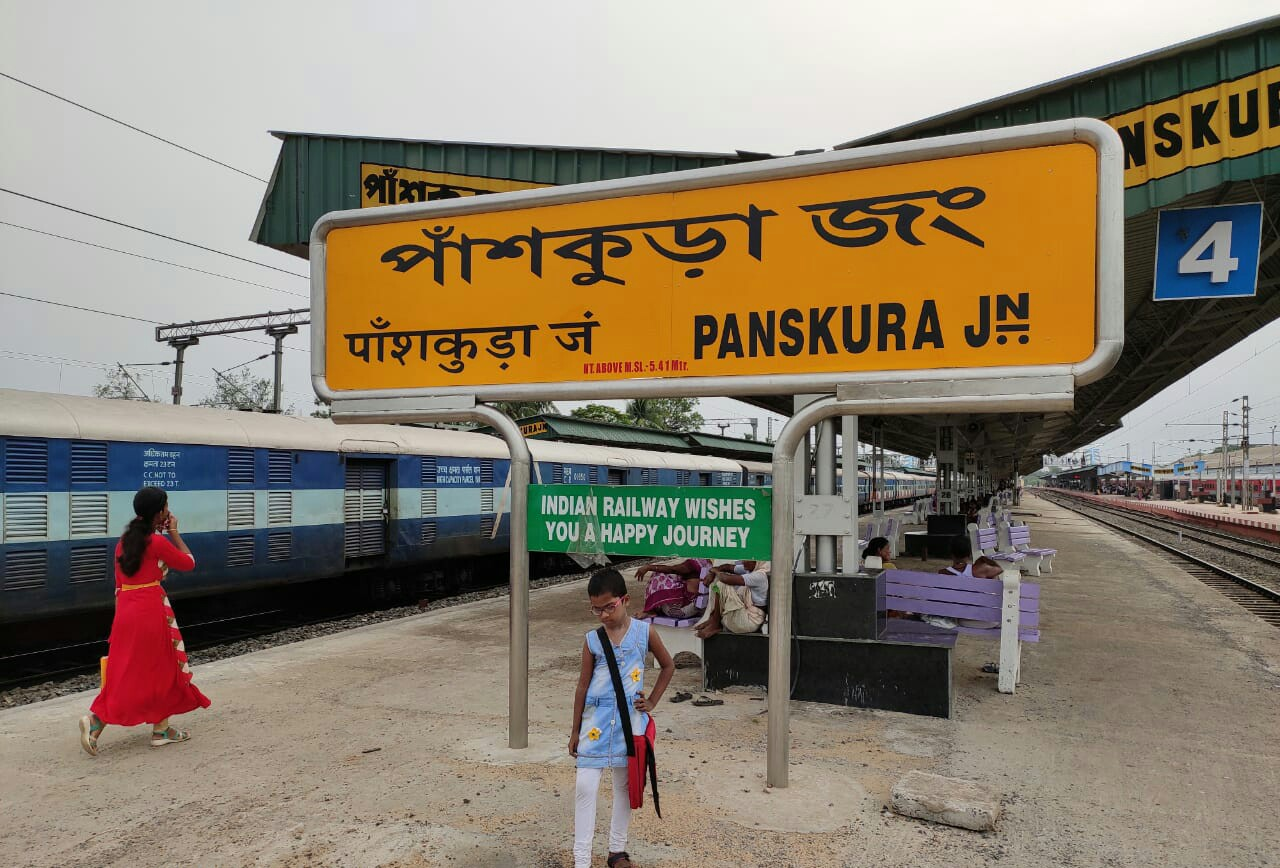
Panskura Junction railway station

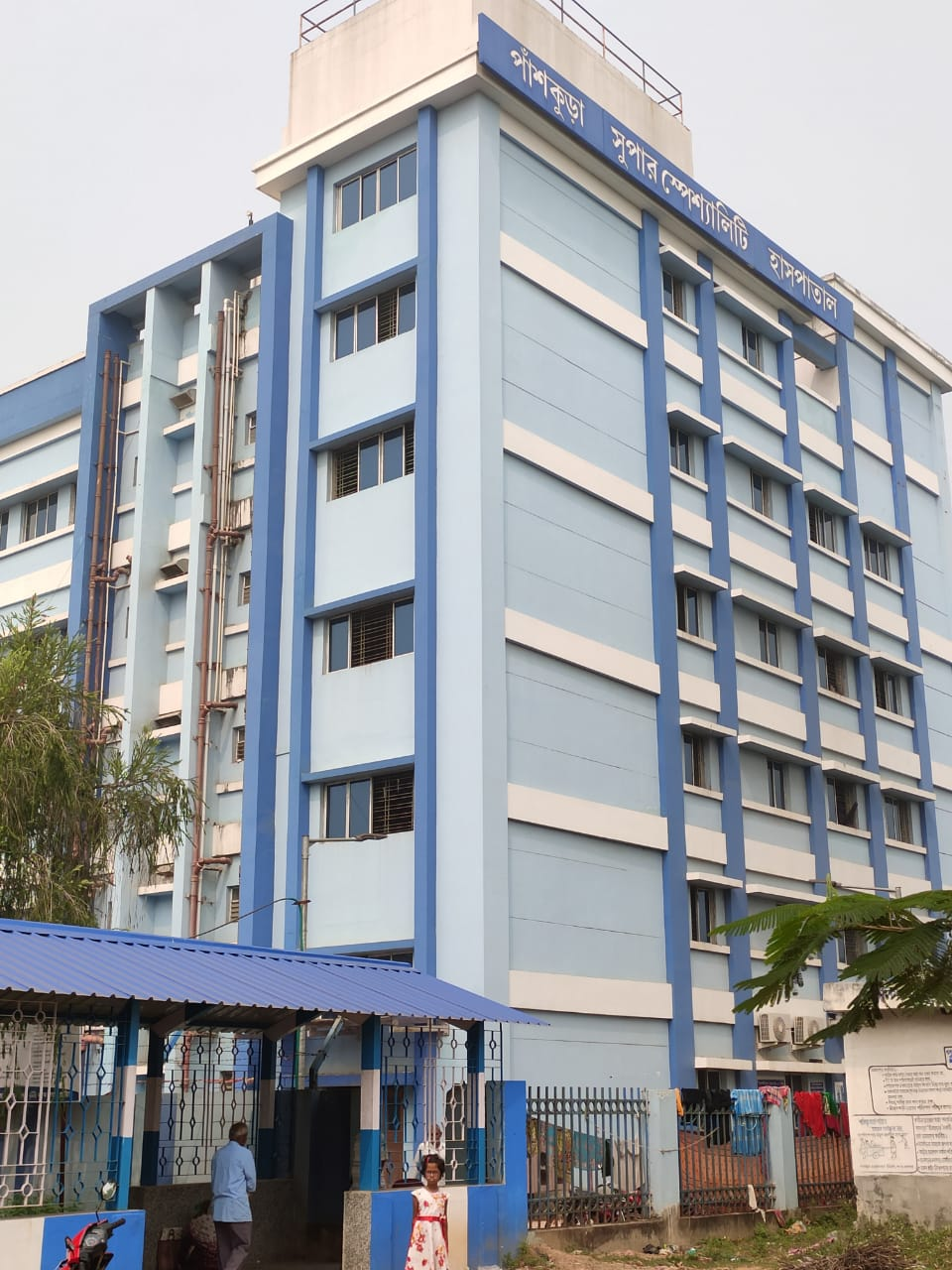
Panskura Super Speciality Hospital
