= Alou =

Alou may refer to:

== People ==
=== Given name ===
- Alou Diarra (born 1981), French footballer
- Alou Kuol (born 2001), Australian footballer
- Alou Traoré (born 1974), Malian footballer

=== Surname ===
- Antoinette Tidjani Alou, Jamaican-Nigerien academic and writer
- Felipe Alou (born 1935), Dominican baseball player and manager, brother of Matty and Jesús
- Jesús Alou (1942–2023), Dominican outfielder, brother of Felipe and Matty
- Matty Alou (1938–2011), Dominican outfielder, brother of Felipe and Jesús
- Moisés Alou (born 1966), American outfielder, son of Felipe
- Oussama Alou (born 2002), Dutch footballer

== Others ==
- Alou, Cameroon, town and commune in Cameroon
- Alou (telecommunications company), a Cape Verdan telecommunications company

== See also ==
- Aloo (disambiguation)
- Alu (disambiguation)
