= Keema matar =

Minced meat dish from India and Pakistan

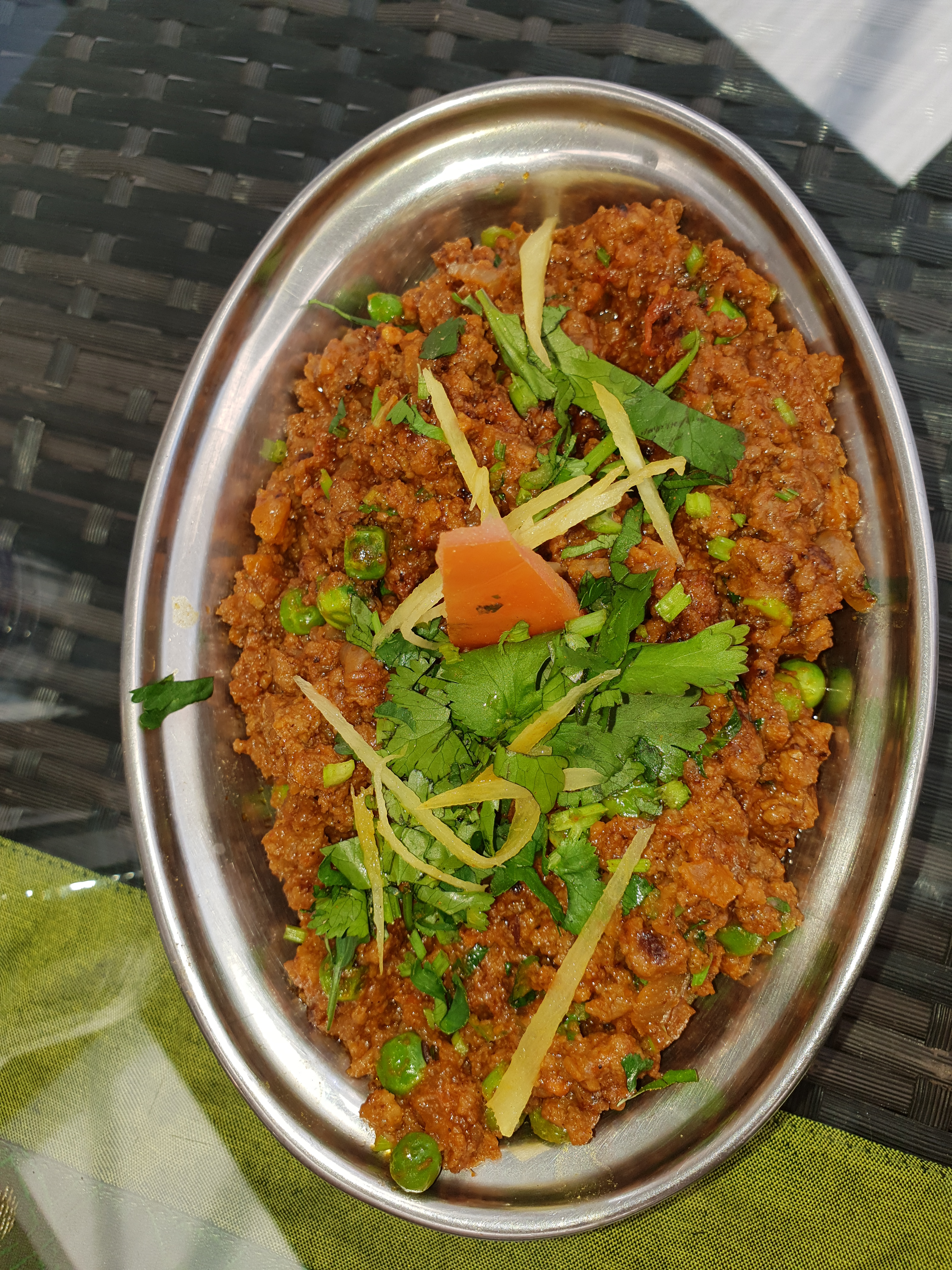
- Keema matar
- Alternative names: Matar gosht
- Type: House food
- Place of origin: Indian subcontinent
- Region or state: Indian subcontinent
- Associated cuisine: India, Bangladesh, Pakistan
- Main ingredients: Minced meat and pea
- Ingredients generally used: Indian spices
- Similar dishes: Aloo keema
- Other information: Aloo matar

Keema matar (English: "mince and peas"), also rendered qeema matar, is a dish from the Indian subcontinent associated with the Mughals. The term is derived from Chaghatai Turkic قیمه ghimeh (minced meat) which is cognate with Turkish kıyma (minced or ground meat).

== History ==
"Keema matar" was popularly eaten in the courts of Mughal India.

=== Name ===
The dish was originally called "keema matar" but is referred to as "matar qeema" nowadays. In Pakistan, due to the way the letter ق is pronounced, the dish is spelled with a "q" (qeema), but in India and Bangladesh it is written with a "k" (keema).

=== Variations ===
A popular variation of this dish is aloo keema (potatoes and minced meat). It is commonly cooked in North Indian and Pakistani households.

Keema is also used as a filling for samosas.

== Ingredients ==
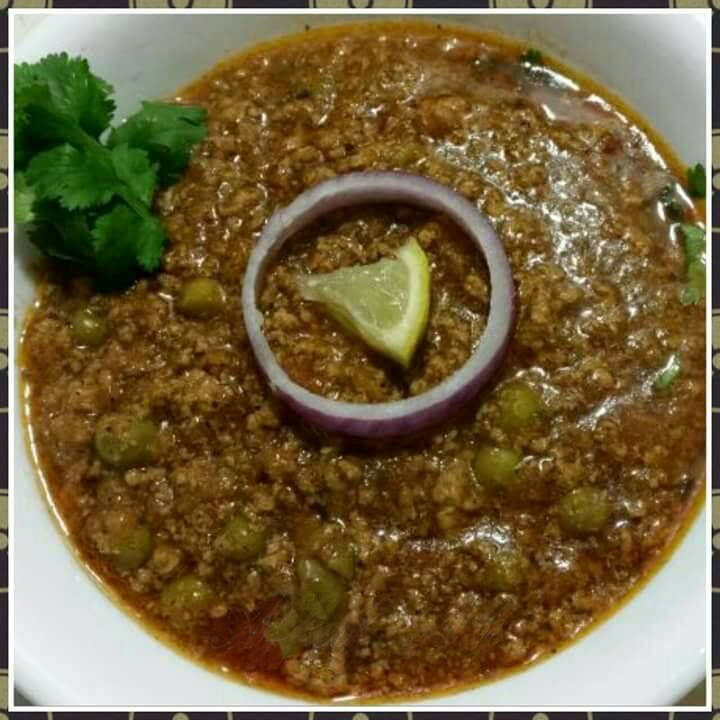
Keema matar with Indian spices

The primary ingredients of this dish are already specified in its name—"matar" (peas) and "keema" (mince). Meats used include ground goat meat, lamb, or beef. All other ingredients include Indian spices and water with banaspati ghee.

== See also ==
- Aloo matar
- List of legume dishes
