= Valley of Flowers (West Bengal) =

- Flower valley
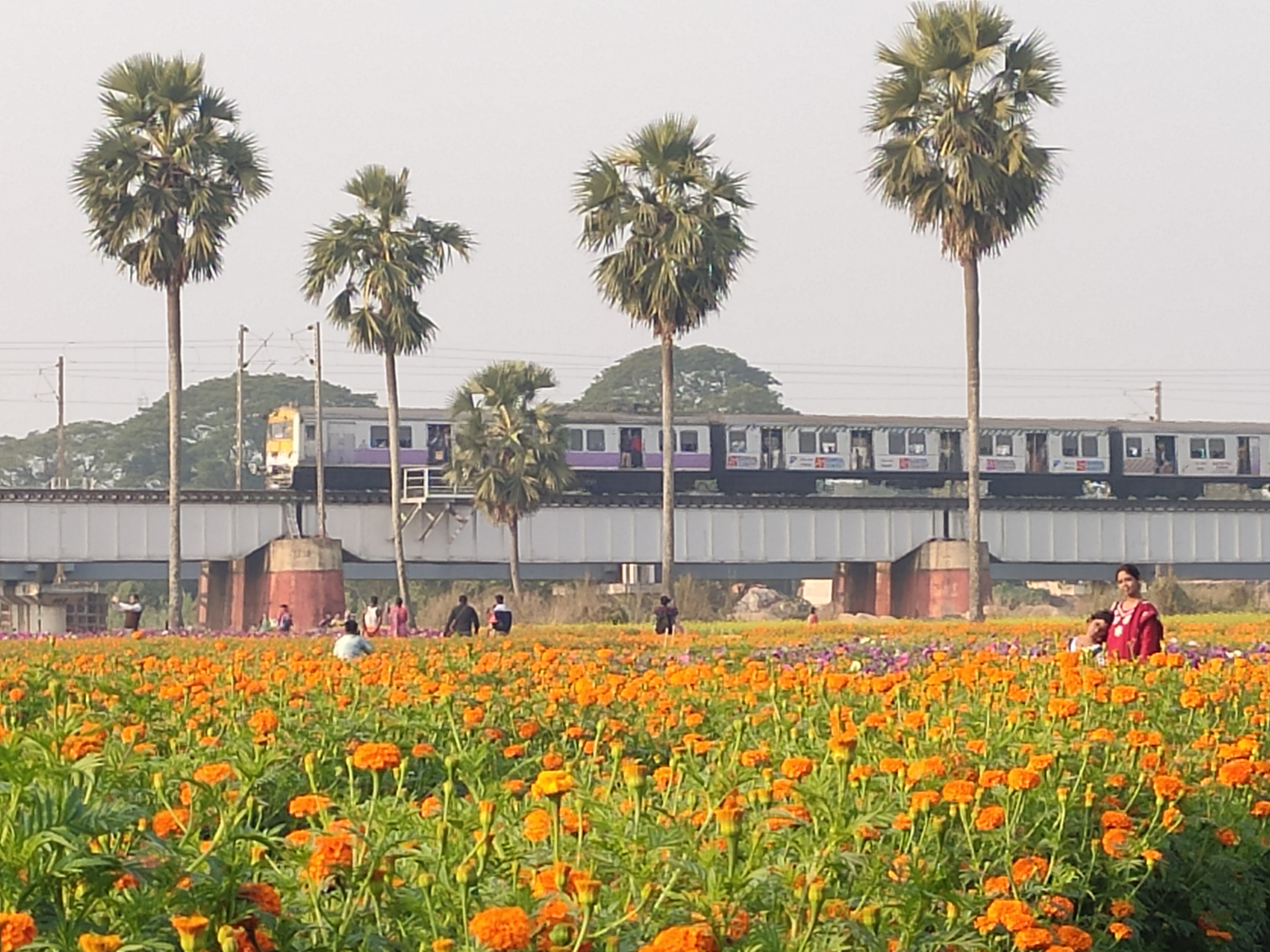
- View of the Valley of Flowers Khirai, Dokanda
- Interactive map of Valley of Flowers
- Coordinates: 22°22′28″N 87°41′48″E

The Valley of Flowers Khirai is nestled in the upper expanses of Kansai (River Kansabati) near Khirai railway station in the Panskura region of India. The lower reaches of Kansai near Dokanda village is known as Kansai Valley. The Valley of Flowers is in the Dokanda valley. It lies between 22° 38' to 22° 22'N and 87° 71' to 87° 41'E. Different kinds of flower paint the Valley of Flowers Dokanda in pink and yellow in the first week of January.

== Gallery ==
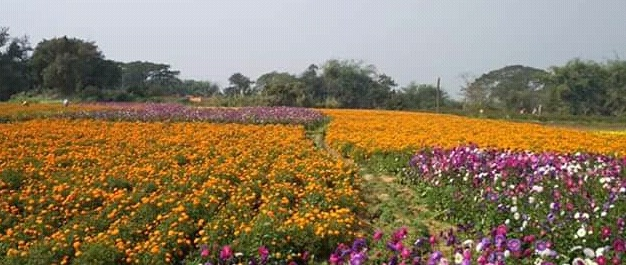
Flower valley

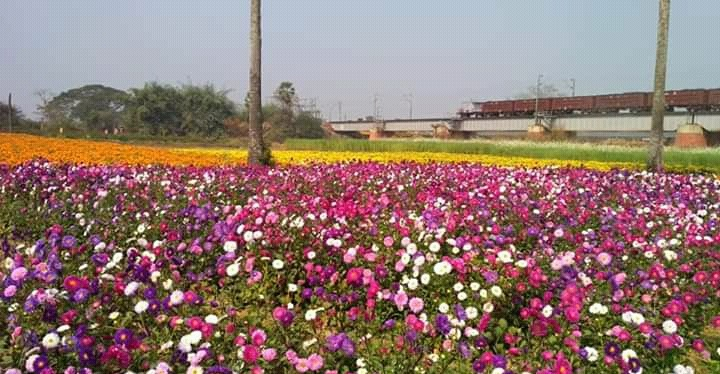
Valley of Flowers in Dokanda
