= Alo (given name) =

Estonian male given name

- Gender: Male
- Language: Estonian

Origin
- Region of origin: Estonia

Alo is an Estonian-language male given name.

People named Alo include:

- Alo Bärengrub (born 1984), Estonian footballer
- Alo Dupikov (born 1985), Estonian footballer
- Alo Jakin (born 1986), Estonian acyclist
- Alo Kelly (born 1977), Irish professional boxer
- Alo Kõrve (born 1978), Estonian actor
- Alo Libang (born 1964), Indian politician
- Alo Mattiisen (1961–1996), Estonian composer
- Alo Raun (1905–2004), Estonian linguist
- Alo Sila, American football player
- Alo Suurna (1913–2008), Estonian basketball and volleyball player
- Alo Toom (born 1986), Estonian wrestler
