= Panskurar Chop =

Snack originating from the Indian subcontinent

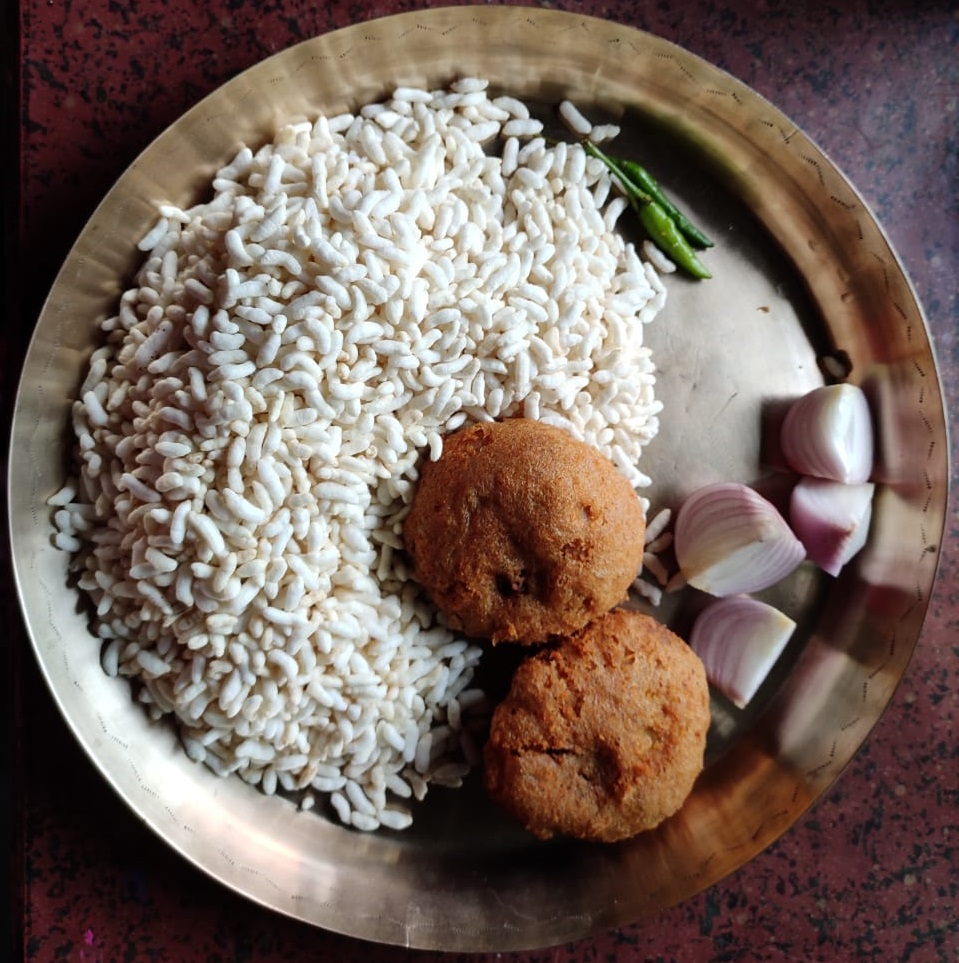
- Panskurar Chop
- Type: Snack
- Serving temperature: Hot
- Main ingredients: Potatoes, spices, herbs

Panskurar Chop (Bengali: পাঁশকুড়ার চপ) a snack originating from the Indian subcontinent; in West Bengal at Panskura "Panskura" means an area in Purba Medinipur district, and the word "chop" means a small cutlet fritters or croquette in Bengali. It is served hot and warm along with muri (puffed rice), green chilies, and sometimes salads on dry Sal leaves. It is a vegetarian alternative, and an Indian Bengali equivalent of the aloo tikki of Mumbai. It is said that in 1955 a local vendor Madan Mohan Dolai who was an ex karigar of Bhim Nag sweet shop Kolkata added some ingredients and modified the old style aloor chop to modern Panskurar chop. He also hired some local venders and started to sell and advertise it in different places of South Bengal.That was the time when local vendors selling food in Railways are popular for Madan Babur Panskurar Chop. Several people learned from him and started their own business from here(Natuda-Natur hotel, Jhantuda-Keshapath etc.). It started to lose its popularity after Madan Babu suddenly stopped the business due to his poor health in the late twentieth century. Now it can be found in various places in West Bengal.
