= Alu chat =

Indian snack

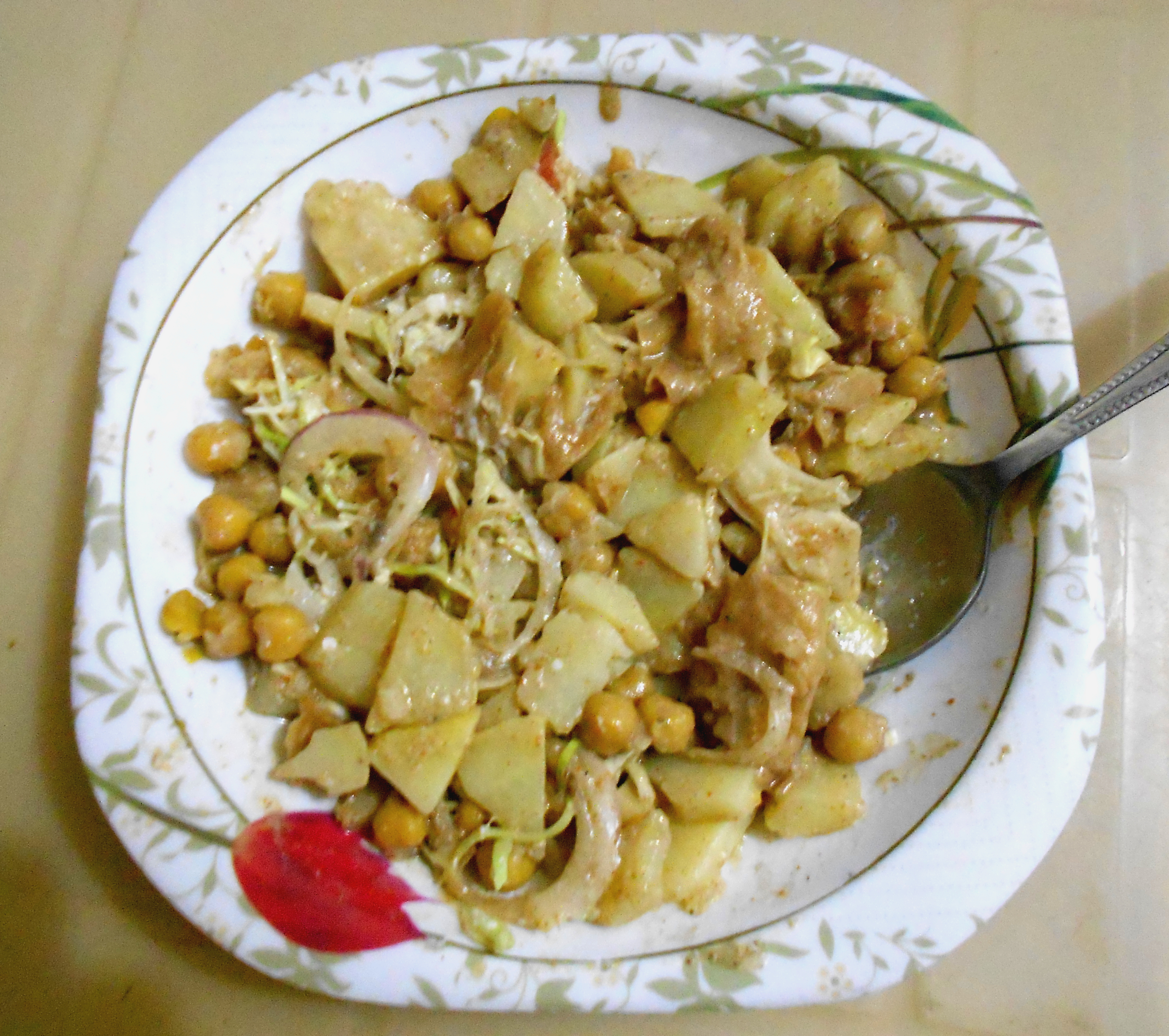
- A bowl of alu chat
- Type: snack
- Place of origin: Indian subcontinent
- Region or state: North India, West Bengal, Sylhet
- Associated cuisine: India, Bangladesh, Pakistan
- Main ingredients: Potatoes, oil, spices, chutney

Alu chat (also spelled alu chaat, aloo chat, or aloo chaat) is a street food originating from the Indian subcontinent. It is popular in North India, West Bengal in Eastern India, Pakistan, and also in parts of Sylhet Division of Bangladesh. It is prepared by frying potatoes in oil and adding spices and chutney. It can also be prepared with unfried boiled potatoes, adding fruits along with spices, lime juice and chutney.

Alu chat is mainly a street food. It can be served as a snack, a side dish or a light meal. It is made from boiled and fried cubed potatoes served with chat masala. It is a versatile dish that has many regional variations. The word alu means potatoes in Hindi and the word chat is derived from the Hindi word chatna, which means 'tasting'. Thus, 'alu chat' means a savory potato snack.

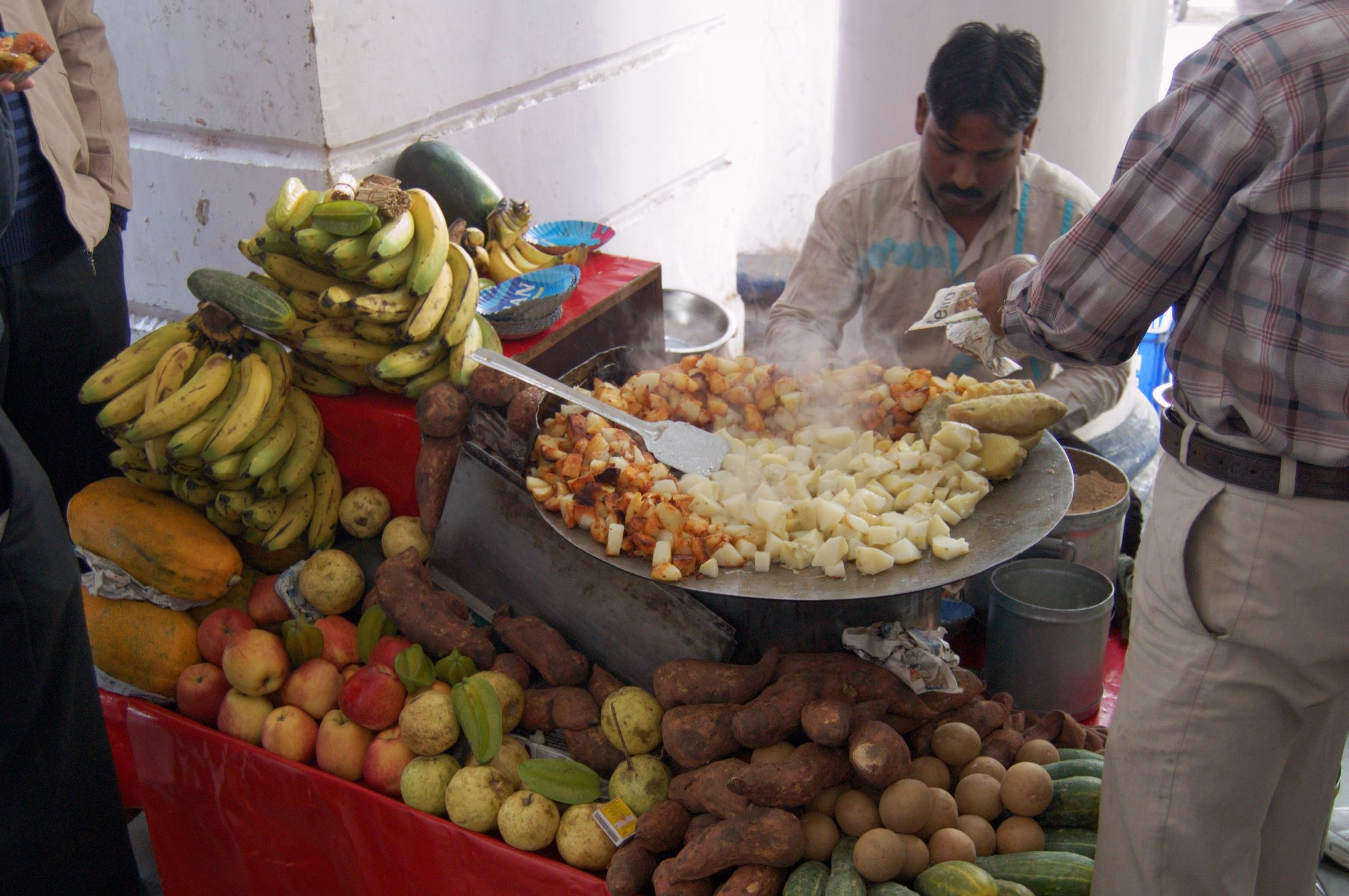
Alu chat vendor, Connaught Place, New Delhi

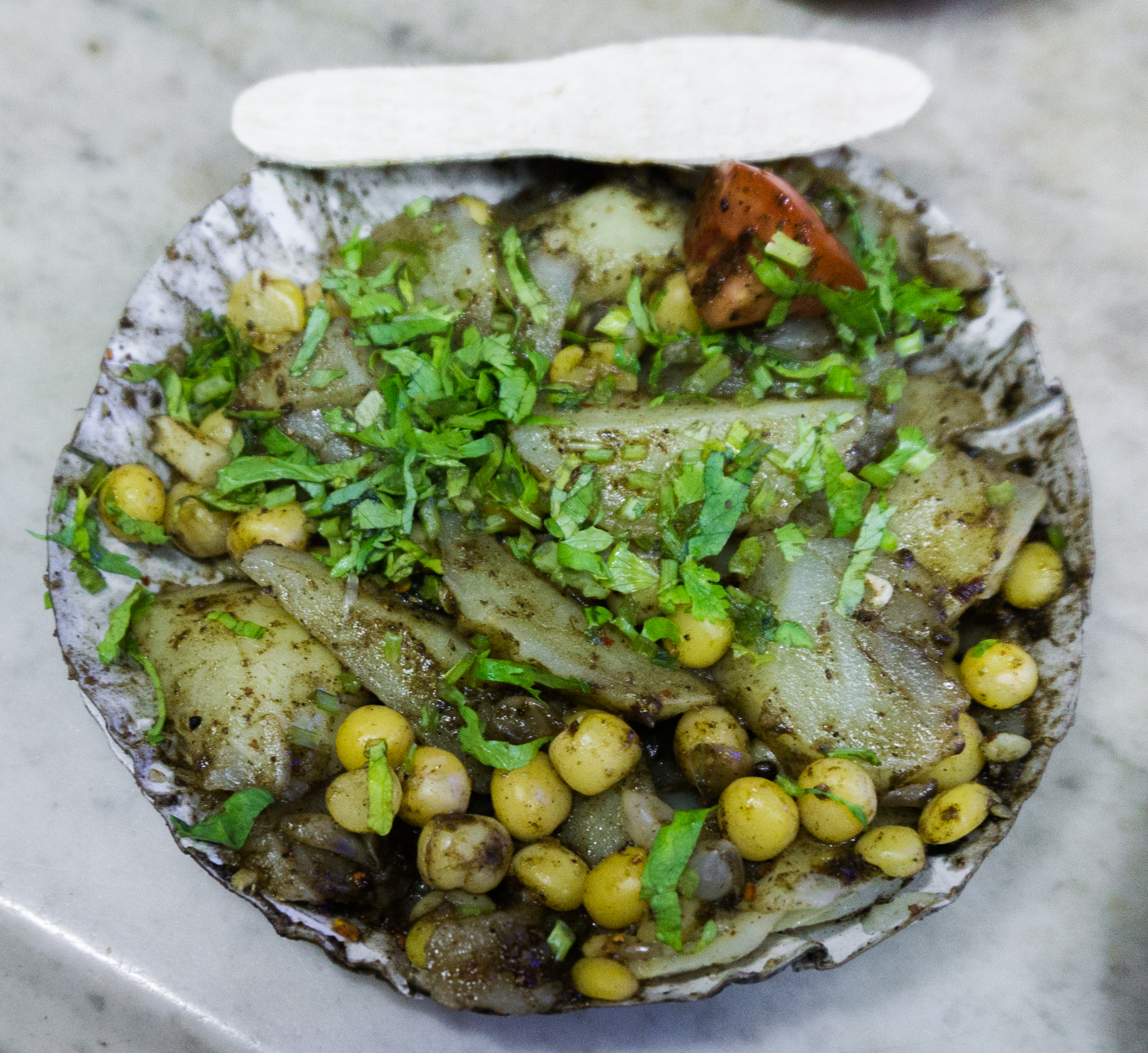
Alu kabli, a Bengali alu chat made with sliced boiled potatoes, chickpeas, tomatoes, cucumbers, tamarind sauce, Bengali spices, and chopped chillies, and garnished with coriander leaves
