= Aloo Jal Chibber =

Indian politician

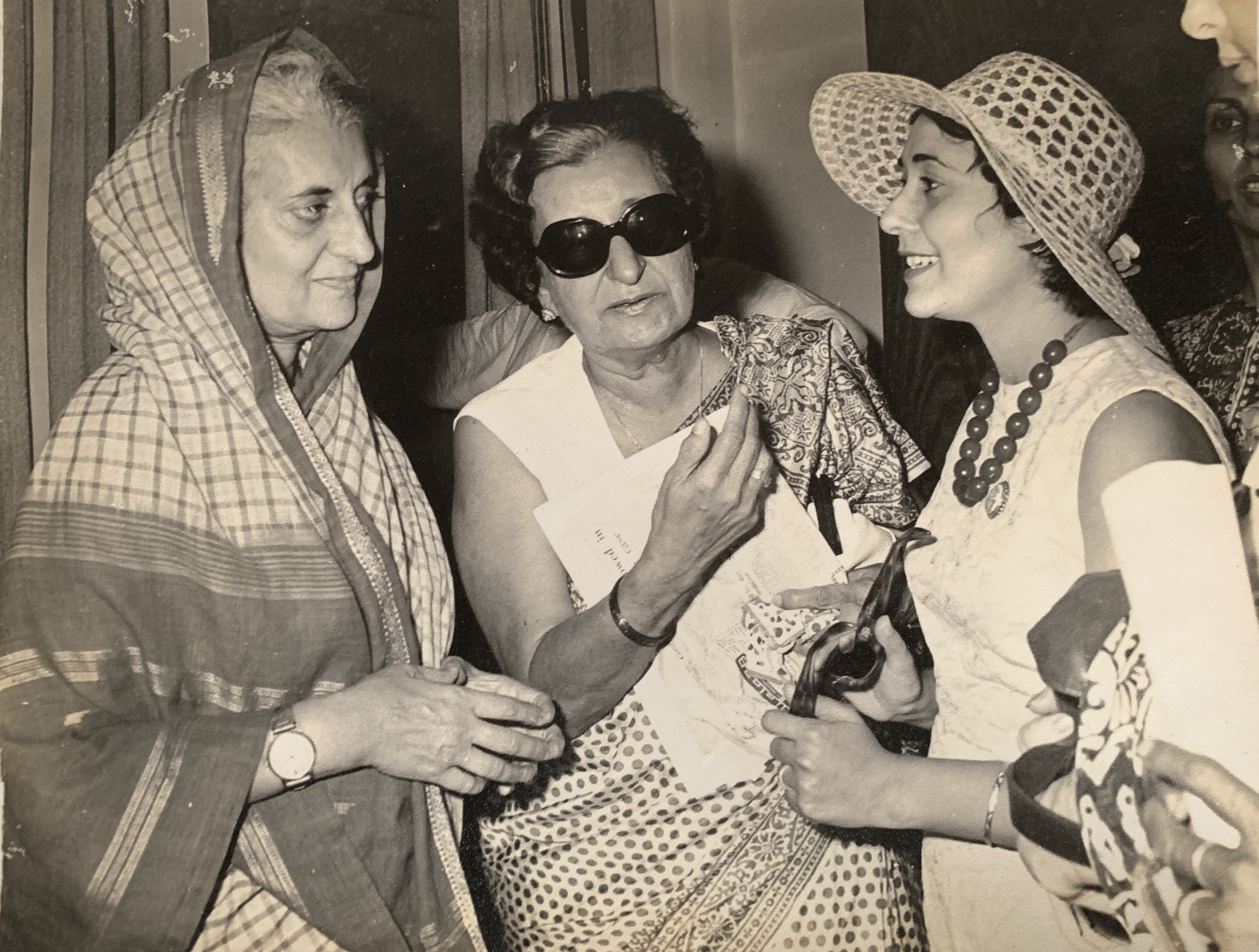
Aloo Chibber with Indira Gandhi, Former Prime Minister of India.

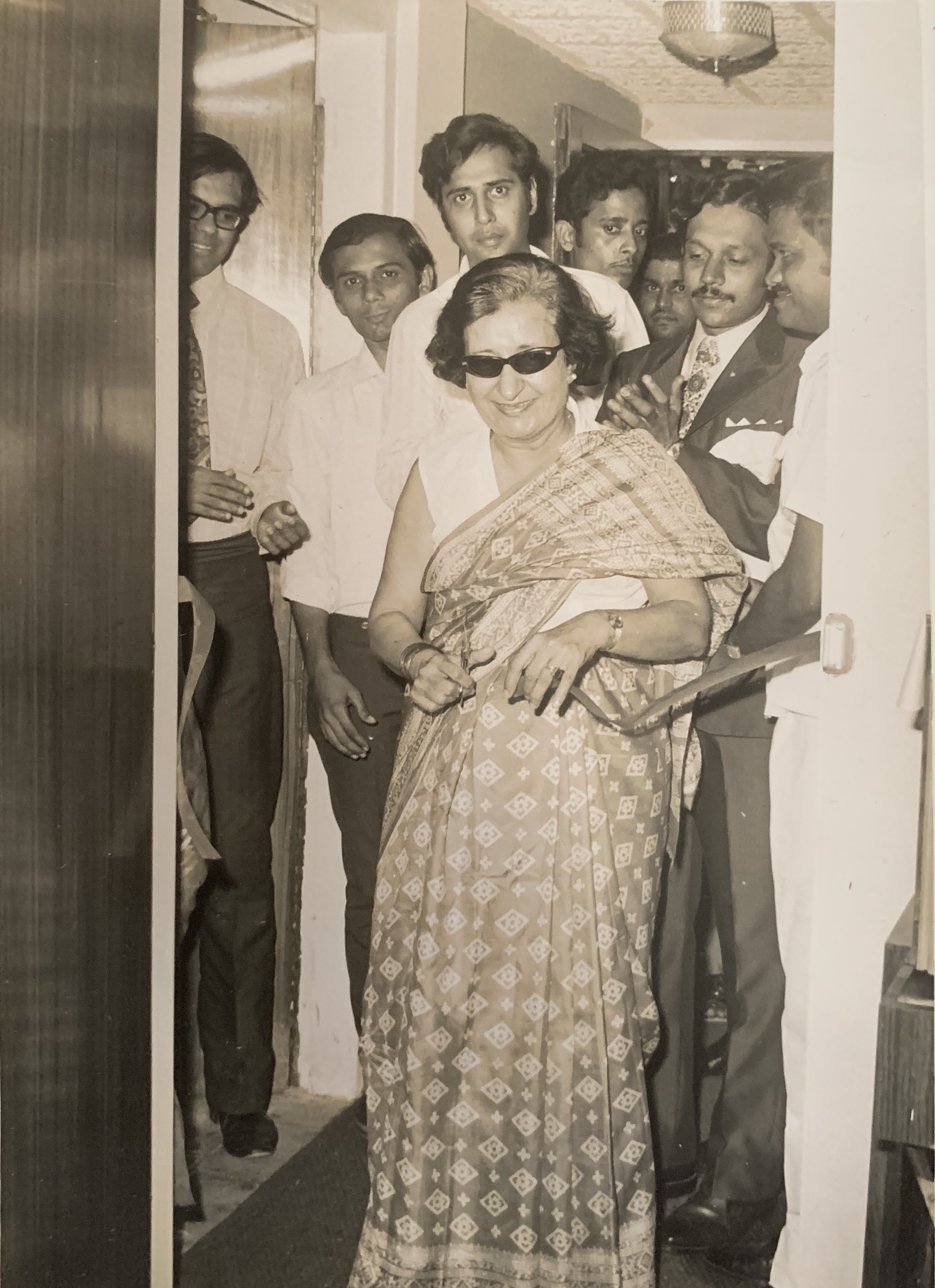

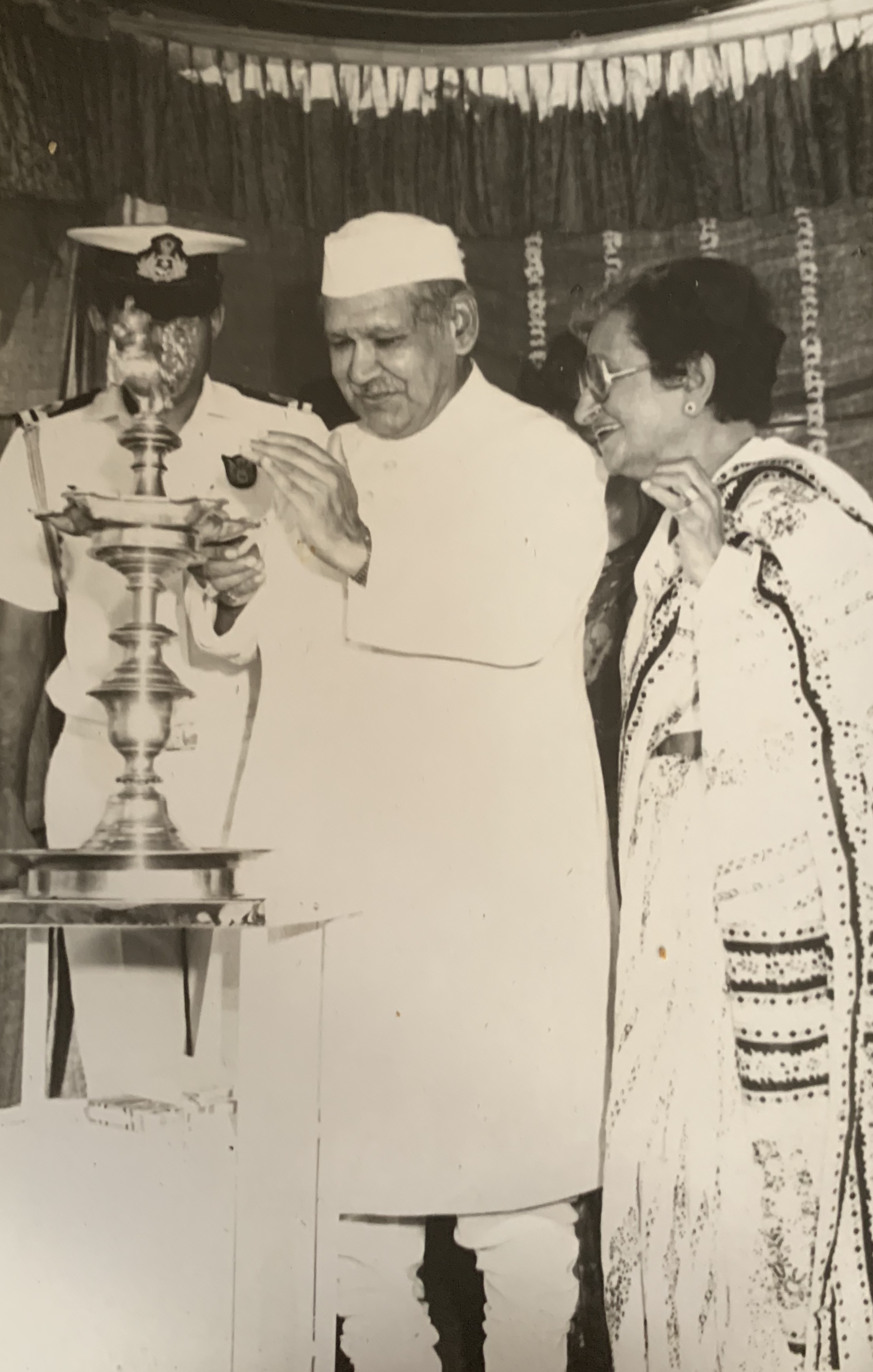
Aloo Jal Chibber lights the inaugural lamp along with Shankar Dayak Sharma, Former President of India

Aloo Jal Chibber was an Indian politician who served as a member of the Maharashtra Legislative Assembly from Vidhan Sabha Constituency (Colaba) (1972–1978). She has secured the highest win percentage till date. She was a minister of independent charge for minorities. She was later elected as a member of the Maharashtra Legislative Council twice. Her experience in grassroots politics made her a responsible legislator. She was a member of the Films Division, Ministry of Information and Broadcasting. She was a close aide and confidante of then Prime Minister Indira Gandhi.

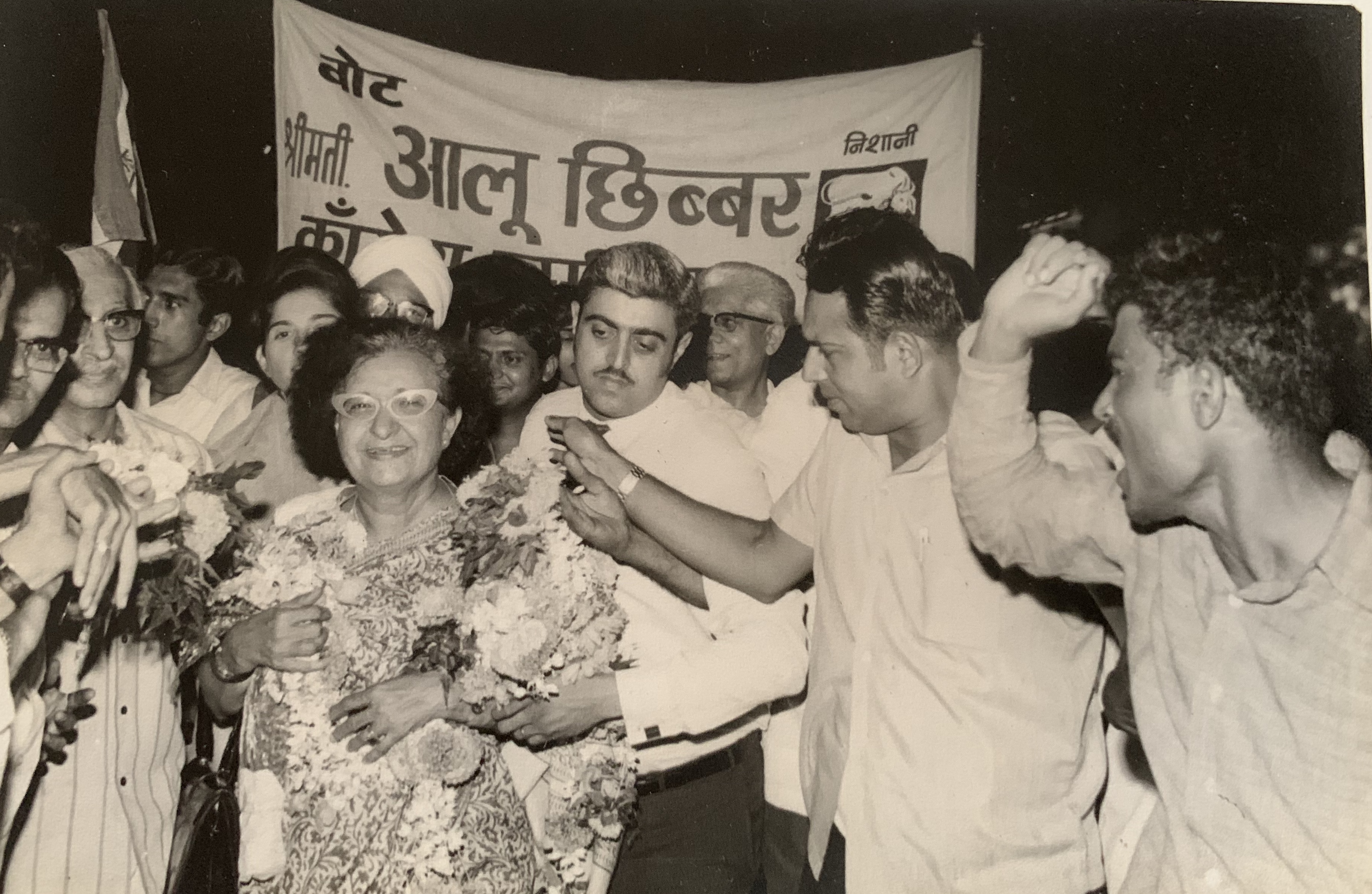
Aloo Chibber victory.

She was also a member of the Government of India High Power Panel on Minorities, Schedule Castes & Scheduled Tribe & other Weaker Sections. Due to great wisdom and experience, she was made Chairperson of the Maharashtra State Social Welfare Advisory Board. She was a Senate Member of the University of Mumbai.

Later, she became the treasurer and then the general secretary of the Maharashtra State Congress Committee. She was made chairperson of various boards and committees that fought for the right of women children and people of the weaker classes. Later, she became the Chairperson of Various hospitals and welfare societies such as the Children's Aid Society and Cama And Albless Hospitals. She loved to work for social justice and women's rights.

The Chibber Foundation was created in her memory.

== See also ==
- List of Parsis
