= Alo Kelly =

Irish boxer

Personal information
- Nationality: Irish
- Born: Aloysius Kelly Milltownpass, County Westmeath, Ireland
- Weight: light heavyweight

Boxing career

Boxing record
- Total fights: 6
- Wins: 5
- Win by KO: 3
- Losses: 0
- Draws: 1
- No contests: 0

Aloysius Kelly (born in County Westmeath, Ireland), more commonly known as Alo Kelly, is a former New York based Irish professional boxer from Milltownpass, County Westmeath, Ireland who was the Irish light heavyweight champion. Kelly fought at light heavyweight until he had prematurely retire from boxing due to a detached retina.

== Amateur career ==
In 1999, Kelly represent the Brosna ABC at the 1997 Irish Senior Middleweight Championships and was defeated by Brian Magee in the quarter-finals.

At amateur level, Kelly became Irish Senior light middleweight champion.

== Professional career ==
Kelly turned professional in July 2007 in Saratoga Springs, New York, United States on an undercard of bill that included Andre Berto and Chazz Witherspoon. In his debut Kelly was on the floor in his first round but went on to defeat journeyman Rafael Jastrzebski with a points victory over four rounds.
