= ALU =

ALU, Alu or alu may refer to:

== Computing and science ==
=== Computing ===
- Arithmetic logic unit, a digital electronic circuit

=== Biology ===
- Alu sequence, a type of short stretch of DNA
- Arthrobacter luteus, a bacterium

== Organizations ==
- Abraham Lincoln University, Los Angeles, California, US
- African Leadership University
- Alcatel-Lucent, a telecommunications equipment company
- Amazon Labor Union
- American Labor Union
- Army Logistics University, Fort Lee, Virginia, US
- Asia LIFE University, South Korean seminary
- Sarajevo Academy of Fine Arts (Bosnian: Akademija likovnih umjetnosti Sarajevo, acronym: ALU)

== People ==
- Andrea Alù (born 1978), Italian scientist
- Jake Alu (born 1997), American professional baseball player
- Alu, American musician and composer
- Alu Alkhanov (born 1957), Russian Chechen politician

== Places ==
=== Villages and boroughs ===
- Alu, Ardabil, a village in Iran
- Alu, Mazandaran, a village in Iran
- Alu, Estonia, a small borough in Rapla Parish, Rapla County
- Alu, Pärnu County, a village in Pärnu, Pärnu County, Estonia

=== Volcanoes ===
- Alu (Ethiopia)
- Alu, Sulu, Philippines

== Other ==
- Alû, the Mesopotamian demon of night
- Alu (runic), in Germanic paganism
- Alu Kurumba language, a Dravidian language of India

== See also ==
- Aloo (disambiguation)
