= Emmanuel Alo =

Nigerian biologist

Emmanuel Babatunde Alo (born April 15, 1950) is a Nigerian professor of applied biology, ecosystems, entomology and parasitology.

== Background ==
Alo is noted for his research work on the transmission patterns of the HIV virus in the ABO and Rhesus blood groups. Alo's extensive research work on the almost extinct species of Dennettia tripetala is carried by the Chinese Government's National Science and Technology Library, the Institute for Scientific and Technical Information (INIST) of the French National Center for Scientific Research (CNRS) and the United Kingdom's Department for Environment, Food and Rural Affairs.

In 1991 Alo was appointed as the first Dean and founder of the School of Postgraduate Studies at the Federal University of Technology Yola. He went on to serve as the university's Deputy Vice-Chancellor from 1996 to 2000, and as interim Vice-Chancellor in 2001. He is also a chair member of the Executive Leadership Board of Rotary International District 9125.

== Selected works ==
- United Nations' Aquatic sciences and fisheries abstracts, Volume 19,(Published 1989), integrated pest management for developing countries (Nova Science Publishers, 2007) Crop Post-Harvest: Science and Technology, Volume 2 (Wiley-Blackwell;edition 1, November 5, 2004),
- Advances in Virus Research, Vol. 53 Academic Press; 1 edition (October 25, 1999) and Extension Services in Wildlife Conservation: The Extension Agent and Information Worker, 22:267-269 Cambridge University Press.
- Current advances in ecological & environmental Sciences 1996, Volume 22, Issues 1–6.
- The effect of plant density on incidence of the maize streak virus and its vectors Cicadulina spp. (Hemiptera: Cicadellidae). Journal of Plant Protection in the Tropics 10(2): 77–81. Alo, E. B. (1993).
- Harmonization of HIV testing in Nigeria: A missing step in HIV/AIDS control. Abdulazeez AA, Alo EB, Nassar AS. Nig J. Biomed Sci. 2006; 2: 23-26
- Mosquito species and their micro-habitats; Disease and vector management, 4:254-261 Ogidi, J.A., Muazu, A.D. and Alo, E.B. (2002).
- The Biochemistry of the larval Stages of Meloidogyne incognita (Nematoda). Technology and Development (Journal of Scientific and Technological Research) 2: 92–98.
- ALO, E.B; S.L ASOMBA and C.O.E ONWULIRI (1986). A survey of the abundance of insect fauna of various soil samples within Jos Metropolis. The 19th Annual Conference of the Entomological Society of Nigeria at the University of Ife, Ile-Ife held 5–9 October 1986.
- Entomology abstracts, Volume 30 1999, Issues 1-3 By Information Retrieval Limited, Cambridge Scientific Abstracts, Inc.
