= William Nwankwo Alo =

Nigerian politician

Permanent Secretary For Minister of Labour and Employment Nigeria
- Incumbent
- Assumed office 11 November 2015
- Appointed by: President Muhammadu Buhari
- Minister: Chris Ngige as Minister of Labour and Employment Nigeria

Personal details
- Born: 15 April 1965 (age 61)
- Spouse: Uzoma Rita Alo
- Children: 5
- Website: labour.gov.ng

William Nwankwo Alo is a native of Ekwetekwe-Umuezeoka in Ezza North Local Government Area of Ebonyi State. He was born on April 15, 1965. He attended Community Primary School, Ekwetekwe in Ezza North Local Government Area, Ebonyi State. He passed out from the school in 1976 with First School Living Certificate (FSLC).

== Background and education ==
In 1977, he proceeded to St. Aidan's Secondary School, Umuezeoka also in Ezza North Local Government Area. He obtained his West African School Certificate (WASC) in June, 1982.

The quest for higher education took him to the then Anambra State College of Education Awka for a degree programme. He later transferred to University of Nigeria, Nsukka where he obtained BA Hons. Government/Education in 1989. In 1990 he did the mandatory National Youth Service Corps Scheme. He was posted to Lagelu/Egbeda Local Government Area in Oyo State. He completed his National Youth Service Corps Programme in 1991.

Alo lost his 10 year old son, Mattew in his residence in Abakaliki over what was described as a domestic accident.

== Career as a civil servant ==
In December 1992, Alo was employed as an Admin Officer in Enugu State. Following the creation of Ebonyi State on October 1, 1996, Alo, along with other Civil Servants, were moved to the newly created Ebonyi State.

In his service to Ebonyi State (as a civil servant), he served in various ministries, until he rose to the rank of Chief Administrative Officer. He was later appointed a Permanent Secretary in December, 2007. As a Permanent Secretary in Ebonyi State, he served in the office of the Head of Service Ebonyi State, Ministry of Commerce, Industry and Mineral Development, Ministry of Lands, Survey and Housing, and Ministry of Education.

=== Federal appointment ===
In 2013, William transferred his service from the Ebonyi State Government to the Federal Government of Nigeria. He transferred as a Director GL 17 and was posted to the Federal Ministry of Interior.

In November 2015, the President of the Federal Republic of Nigeria, Muhammadu Buhari appointed him a Federal Permanent Secretary. He has served as a Permanent Secretary – Economic Affairs office, Office of the Secretary to the Government of the Federation, Permanent Secretary Ministry of Niger Delta Affairs, Permanent Secretary Special Duties Office, Office of the Secretary to the Government of the Federation and presently, Federal Ministry of Labour and Employment.

Alo was moved from the Police Service Commission (PSC) to the Federal Ministry of Communications and Digital Economy by President Muhammadu Buhari in 2021. This deployment and re-deployment also involved other Seven (7) Permanent Secretaries.

== Academic qualifications ==
1. First School Living Certificate, 1976
2. West African School Certificate, 1982
3. Bachelor of Arts Hons, 1989
4. Post Graduate Diploma (Public Relations), 1994
5. ASCON Certificate, 1993
6. Master of Science (M.Sc.), 2012
7. Ph.D. (Peace & Conflict Resolution), In view (2016 – date)

== Professional bodies ==
1. Member, Institute of Corporate Administration
2. Fellow Chartered Institute of Administration

== Positions held ==
1. General Monitor, Community Primary School, Ekwetekwe, 1975 – 1976
2. Senior Sanitarian, St. Hidans Secondary School Zmuezeoka, 1981- 1982
3. Commissioner for Welfare (Students Union, Government) College of Education, Awka, 1986
4. Chairman Ezza West Local Government Area (Transitional), 2002 – 2003
5. Co-ordinator of Permanent Secretaries, Ebonyi State, 2007 – 2013
6. Permanent Secretary (State/Federal), 2007 to 2023
