= Aloo mutter =

North Indian dish

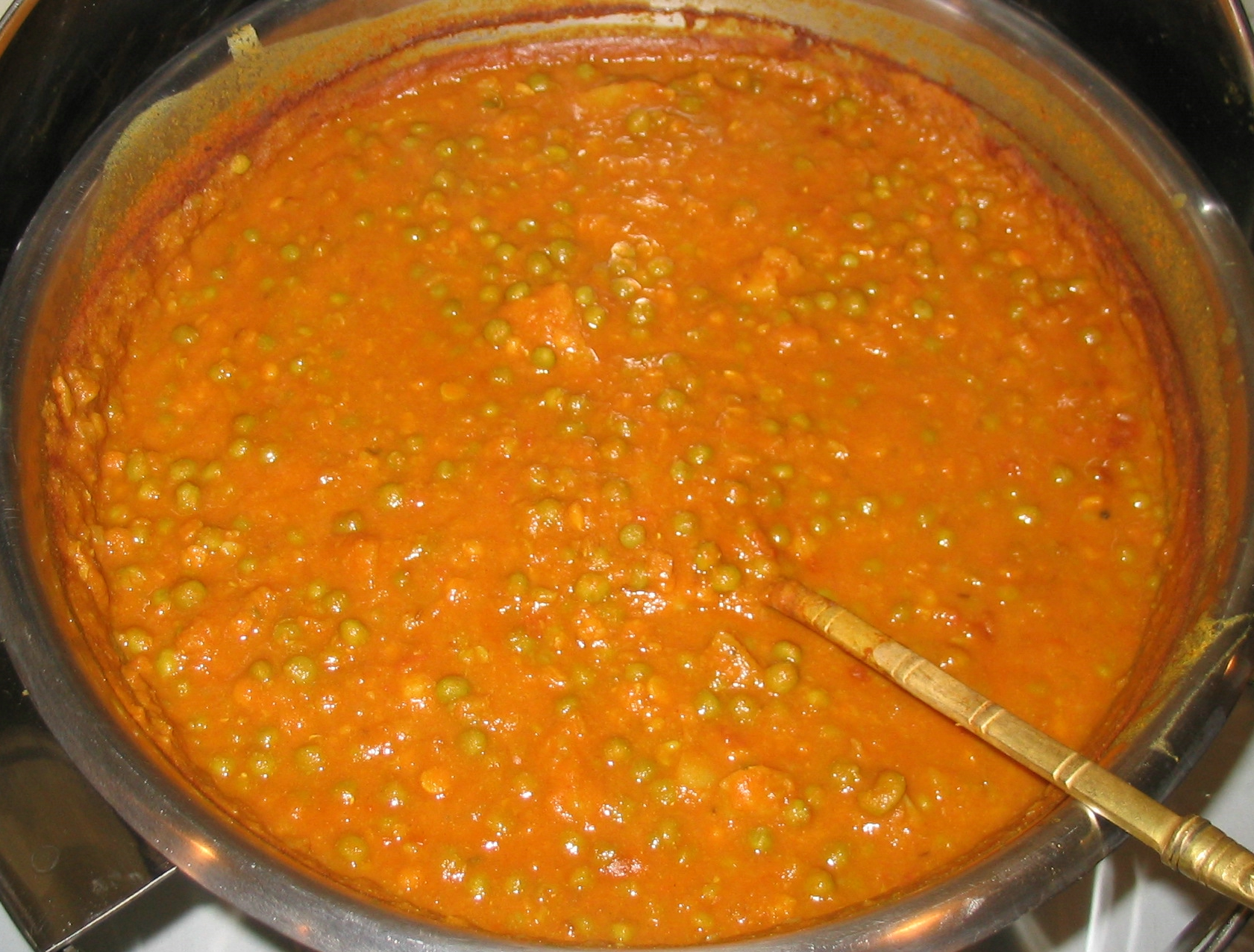
- Aloo mutter cooked in a kadai
- Alternative names: Aloo mattar
- Course: Main
- Place of origin: Indian subcontinent
- Region or state: North India, Indian subcontinent
- Serving temperature: Hot
- Main ingredients: Potatoes and peas
- Variations: Also served dry without gravy

Aloo mutter (also spelled aloo mattar or aloo matar or alu) is a North Indian dish from the Indian subcontinent which is made from potatoes (aloo) and peas (mattar) in a mildly spiced creamy tomato-based gravy. It is a vegetarian dish. The gravy base is generally cooked with garlic, ginger, onion, tomatoes, cilantro (coriander), cumin seeds, red chilli, turmeric, garam masala, and many other spices. It can also be made without onion or garlic.

Aloo mutter is also available commercially in ready-to-eat packets, which need to be heated and served. It is also used as a filling in some variations of dosa. It is served in most North Indian restaurants and is one of the most iconic dishes of North Indian cuisine featured in the West.

== See also ==
- Aloo gobi
- Keema matar
- List of legume dishes
