= Begunbari Kali Temple =

Hindu temple in Begunbari, India

- বেগুনবাড়ি কালী মন্দির
- Location in West Bengal

Religion
- Affiliation: Hinduism
- District: Purba Medinipur
- Deity: Shmashana Adhipati (Kali)
- Festival: Jyoisho Utsob

Location
- Location: Begunbari
- State: West Bengal
- Country: India
- Interactive map of Begunbari Kali Temple
- Coordinates: 22°21′46″N 87°41′47″E

Architecture
- Type: Bengal architecture

Specifications
- Temple: Over 9,000
- Monument: 4,269

Begunbari Kali Temple is a Hindu temple, located in Begunbari, Purba Medinipur, West Bengal, near Khirai railway station in the Panskura block. Situated on the western bank of the Kangsabati River, the temple's presiding deity is Sashan Kali—an incarnation of Goddess Kali.

== History ==
According to folklore, there were two brothers known as Hinu Dung and Dinu Dung. They were wrestlers from King Rajnarayan Roy (1756-1770) and were from an impoverished family. During that time, there was no treatment for cholera so when the infection spread through the area, both Hinu and Dinu fell ill. They prayed to the Goddess Kali (also called Goddess of war) and asked for healing, promising to worship her. After several days, the two brothers became fully cured. However, they could not afford to make a temple or make arrangements for worship.

The two brothers were from the Bagdi community. Traditionally the Bagdi were hunters and gatherers. They were also one of the most prominent warrior clans in old British India. During the British rule in India, many bands of Bagdis participated in criminal activities and consequently declared criminal tribes by the British.

The two brothers Hinu and Dinu committed robberies to serve their ‘Manat’ (oath). As a memorial, there are now formal robbery practices that take place before the worship. As the first worship was held in the field of ‘Begunbari’ (Brinjle garden), it is called the Kali Puja of ‘Begunbari’. Now the entire village is called ‘Begunbari’

== Architecture ==
A replica of the Dakshineswar Kali Temple was built after the original temple was destroyed.

== Festivals ==
A fair is held in June (Jyoisho Utsob). Mats from Sabang, cosmetic items, toys, food, and household items are common items sold at the festival. Thousands of people from around the world attend.
