= Bhavatarini Shmashanpith Kali Temple =

Hindu temple in Panskura, India

- ভবতারিণী মন্দির
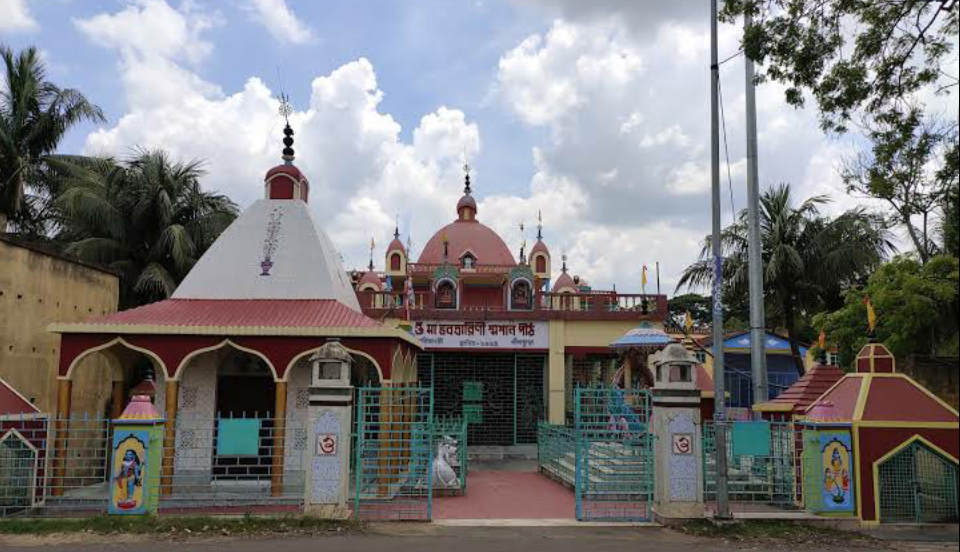
- Bhavatarini Shmashanpith Kali Temple

- Location in West Bengal

Religion
- Affiliation: Hinduism
- District: Purba Medinipur
- Deity: Bhavatarini Kali
- Festivals: Rath Yatra, Hindu Wedding

Location
- Location: Balidangri
- State: West Bengal
- Country: India
- Interactive map of Bhavatarini Shmashanpith Kali Temple
- Coordinates: 22°23′39″N 87°42′56″E

Architecture
- Type: Bengal architecture
- Completed: 1994

Bhavatarini Shmashanpith Kali Temple is a popular Hindu temple located in Balidangri, Purba Medinipur, West Bengal, near Balidangri Primary School in Panskura block. It is situated on the eastern bank of the Kangsabati River, the presiding deity of the temple is Bhavatarini Kali, an aspect of Goddress Kali.

== History ==
Once it was a cremation ground for the local Hindus. About fifty years ago Late Bhutanath Pradhan, who was the Headmaster of Balidungri Primary School, started to pray at night to Maa Bhavatarini and later Late Bishnu Rana also joined with him. At last Sri Paran Manna took initiative to organise everything to give this place a shape to gather and celebrate holy occasions.

== Architecture ==
A temple was constructed in 1994.

== Festivals ==
Rathyatra and Hindu weddings are celebrated in this place.
