= Alo, Mardan =

Alo Village
- Union Council
- Interactive map of Alo Village
- Coordinates: 34°25′59″N 72°03′26″E
- Country: Pakistan
- Province: Khyber Pakhtunkhwa
- District: Mardan District

Population
  - Total: 27,000
- Time zone: UTC+5 (PST)
- Postal code: 23240

Alo is union council of Mardan District in Khyber Pakhtunkhwa province of Pakistan. It has an altitude of 406 metres (1335 feet).
