= Aloo chap =

Snack originating from the Indian subcontinent

Aloo Chap
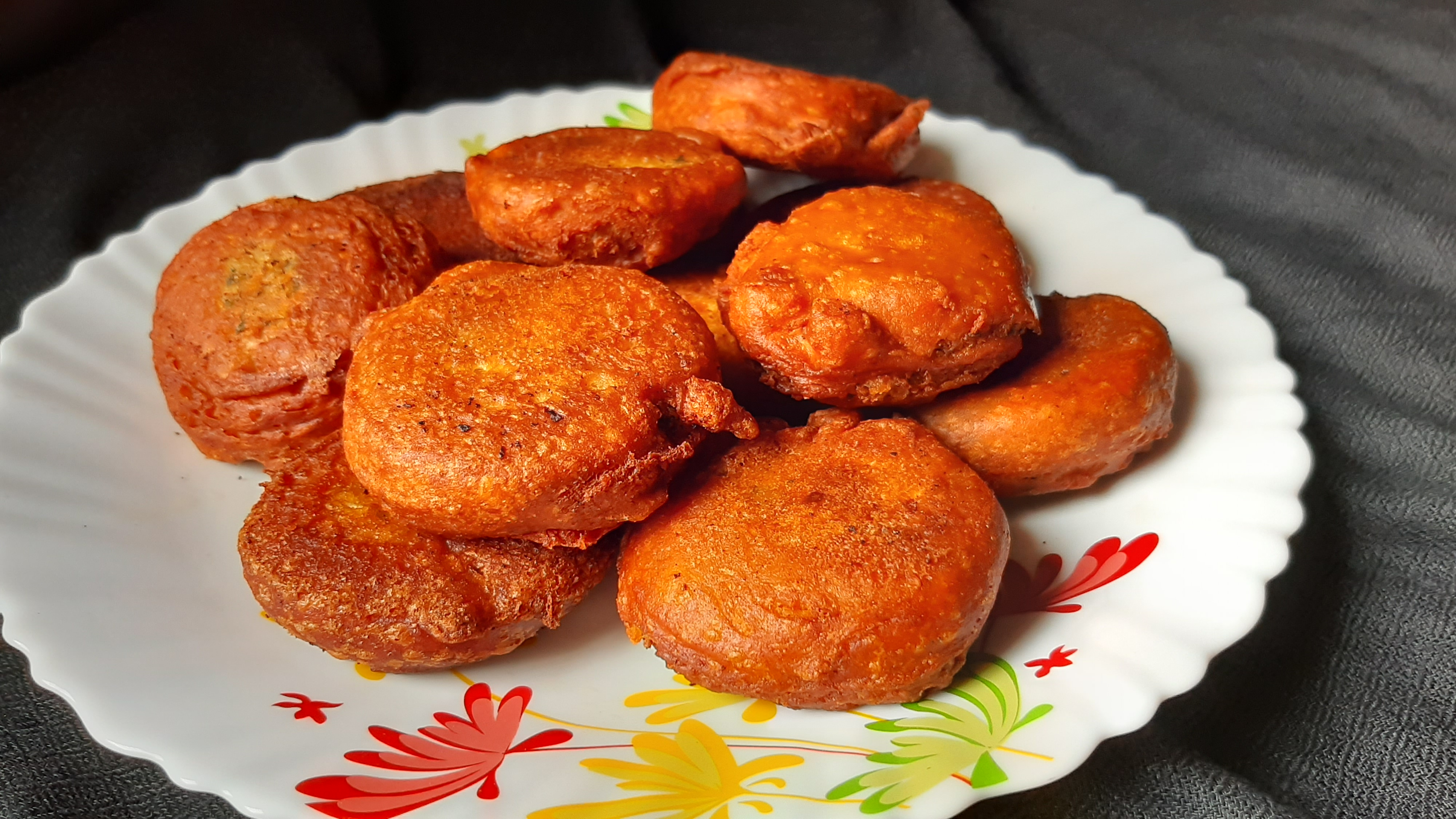
- Aloo chap
- Type: Snack
- Place of origin: Bangladesh, India
- Region or state: Bengal
- Associated cuisine: India, Bangladesh
- Serving temperature: Hot
- Main ingredients: Potatoes, spices, herbs

Aloo Chap (Bengali: আলুর চপ, Odia: ଆଳୁ ଚପ) a snack originating from the Indian subcontinent made out of boiled potatoes and various spices. It is available widely in the Indian states of Bihar, Odisha, Assam, Jharkhand and West Bengal and in Bangladesh. "Aloo" means potato, and the word "chap" means a small cutlet fritters or croquette in Bengali. It is served hot and warm along with muri (puffed rice), green chilies, and sometimes sauce and salads. It is a vegetarian alternative, and an equivalent of aloo tikki.
