= Egra =

Egra Ailan/O-ilian
- Sub-Urban Town
- Egra
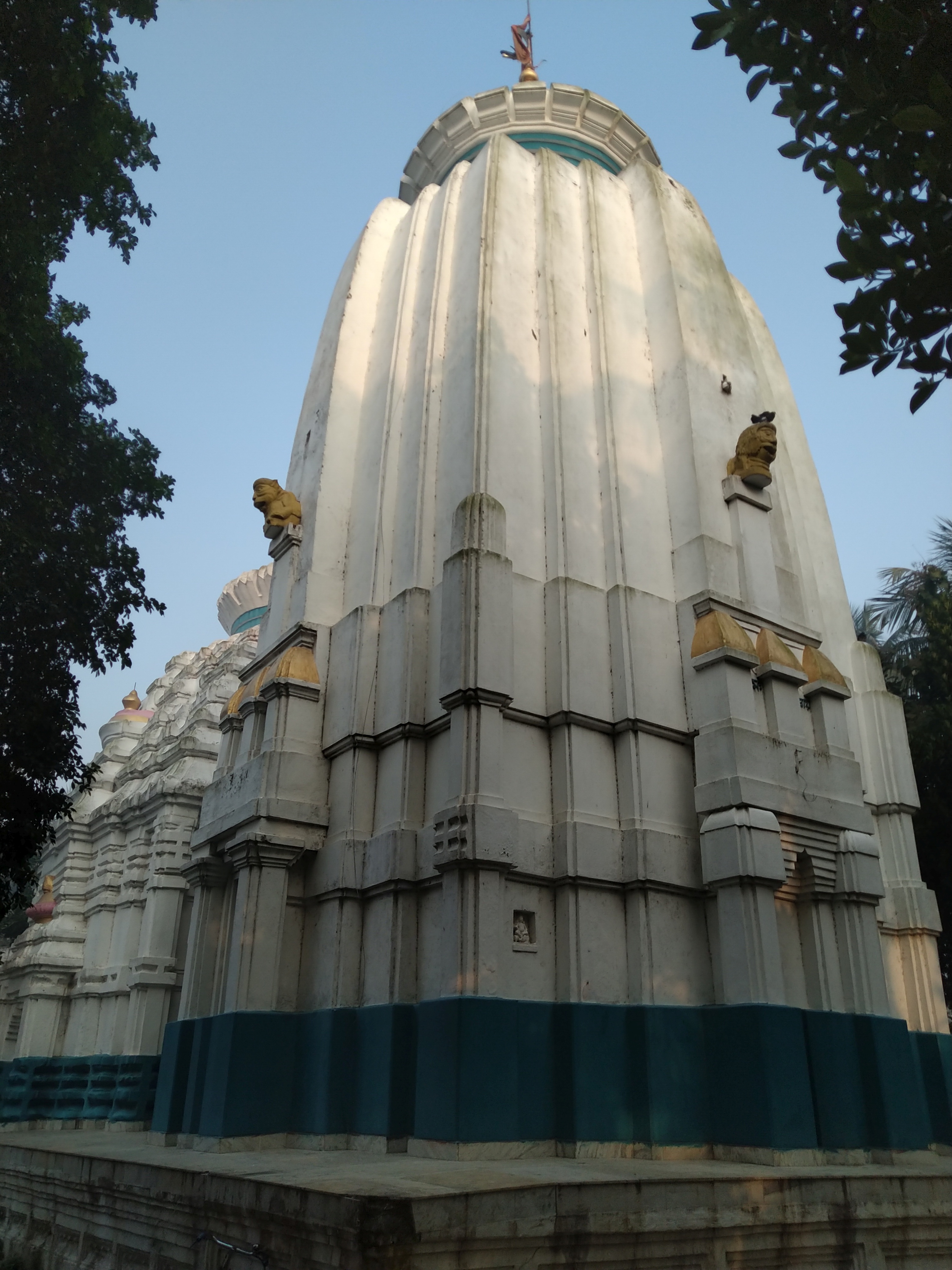
- Shiva deoul Temple in Egra

- Location in West Bengal, India Egra (India)
- Coordinates: 21.9°N 87.53°E
- Country: India
- State: West Bengal
- District: East Medinipur

Government
  - Type: Municipality
  - Body: Egra Municipality

Area
  - Total: 17.21 km^{2} (6.64 sq mi)
- Elevation: 11 m (36 ft)

Population (2011)
  - Total: 30,148
  - Density: 1,752/km^{2} (4,537/sq mi)

Languages
  - Official: Bengali, English
- Time zone: UTC+5:30 (IST)
- PIN: 721429
- Telephone code: 91 (0)3220
- Lok Sabha constituency: Medinipur
- Vidhan Sabha constituency: Egra
- Website: purbamedinipur.gov.in

Egra is a town in East Medinipur district in the state of West Bengal, India. It is the headquarters of the Egra subdivision. The ancient name of Egra was "Agrapattan".

== Geography ==
Cities and towns in Egra subdivision of Purba Medinipur district
M: municipal city/ town, CT: census town, R: rural/ urban centre, H: historical/ religious centre.
Owing to space constraints in the small map, the actual locations in a larger map may vary slightly

=== Location ===
Egra is located at 21.9°N 87.53°E. It has an average elevation of 11 metres (36 feet).

=== Police station ===
Egra police station has jurisdiction over Egra municipality, Egra I and Egra II CD blocks. Egra police station covers an area of 431.5 km^{2} with a population of 349,489. The police station is located at Egra Bazar.

=== Urbanisation ===
96.96% of the population of Egra subdivision live in the rural areas. Only 3.04% of the population live in the urban areas, and that is the lowest proportion of urban population amongst the four subdivisions in Purba Medinipur district.

Note: The map alongside presents some of the notable locations in the subdivision. All places marked in the map are linked in the larger full screen map.

== Demographics ==
As per 2011 Census of India, Egra had a total population of 30,148 of which 15,291 (51%) were males and 14,857 (49%) were females. Population below 6 years was 3,241. The total number of literates in Egra was 23,447 (87.14% of the population over 6 years).

As of 2001 India census, Egra had a population of 25,180. Males constitute 51% of the population and females 49%. Egra has an average literacy rate of 69%, higher than the national average of 59.5%: male literacy is 77%, and female literacy is 61%. In Egra, 13% of the population is under 6 years of age.

== Education ==
Egra Sarada Shashi Bhusan College was established at Egra in 1968. It is affiliated to Vidyasagar University and offers undergraduate courses in arts, science and commerce, It has hostel facilities.

Egra Jhatulal High School was established at Egra in 1926 and Egra Swarnamayee Girls' High School was established in 1940.

== Culture ==
David J. McCutchion mentions:

- The Ramachandra temple at Chirulia as a high towered baro-chala with ratha projections, built in 1880, measuring 29’ 9” square, with terracotta and stucco.
- The Hatnagar Shiva temple as having an ekratna tower, with curved cornice and ridging above the western gateway, and a pirha porch having a plain brick pirha porch with base dimensions larger than the main temple, measuring 21’ square + 23’ square,

See also – Alangiri (for Gokulananda Kisora and Raghunatha temples and Rasmancha of Raghunatha) and Panchrol (for Sharabhuja, Madana Mohana, Vrindavanjiu and Radha Vinoda temples).

== Egra picture gallery ==
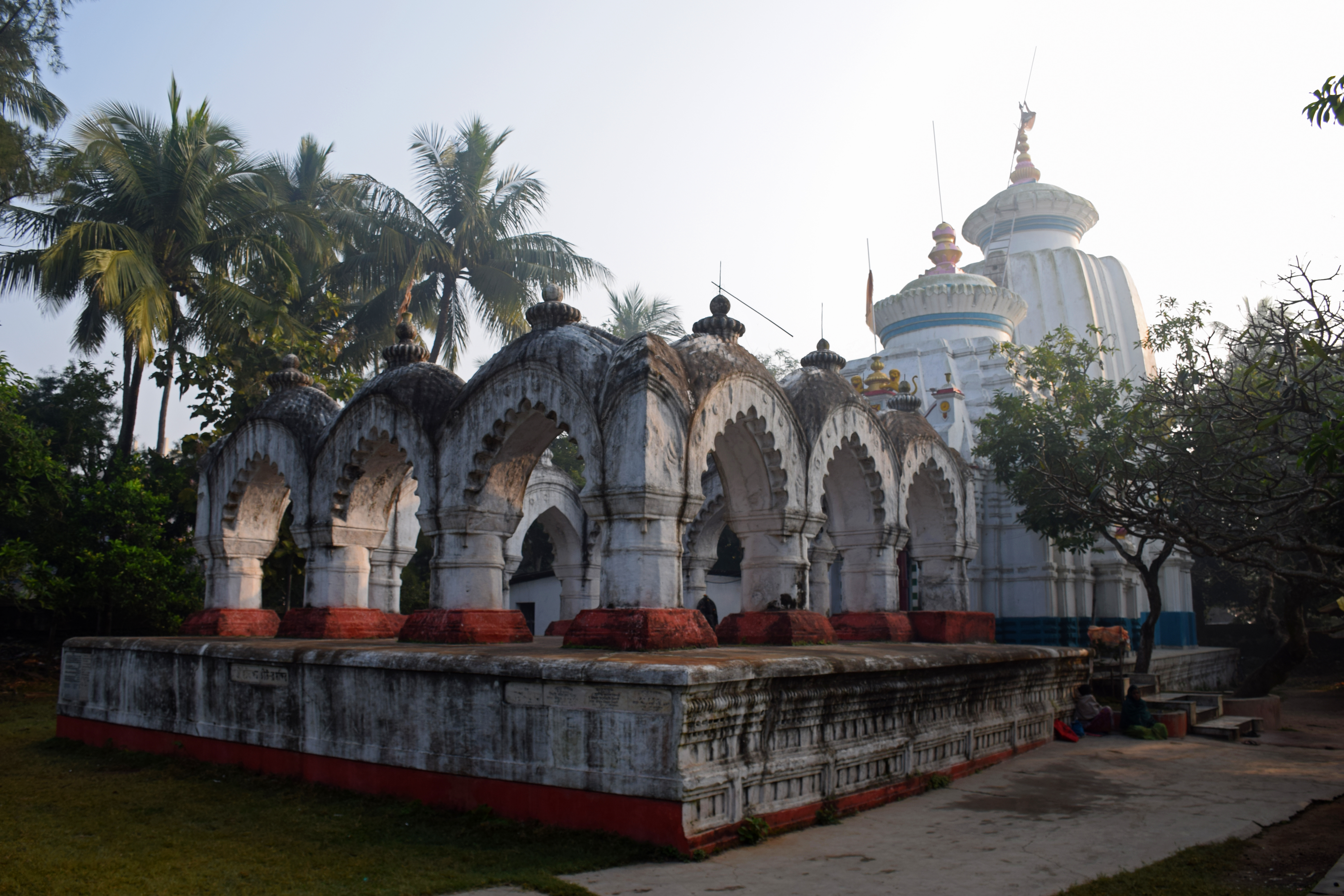
Hatnagar Shiva deul with rasmancha

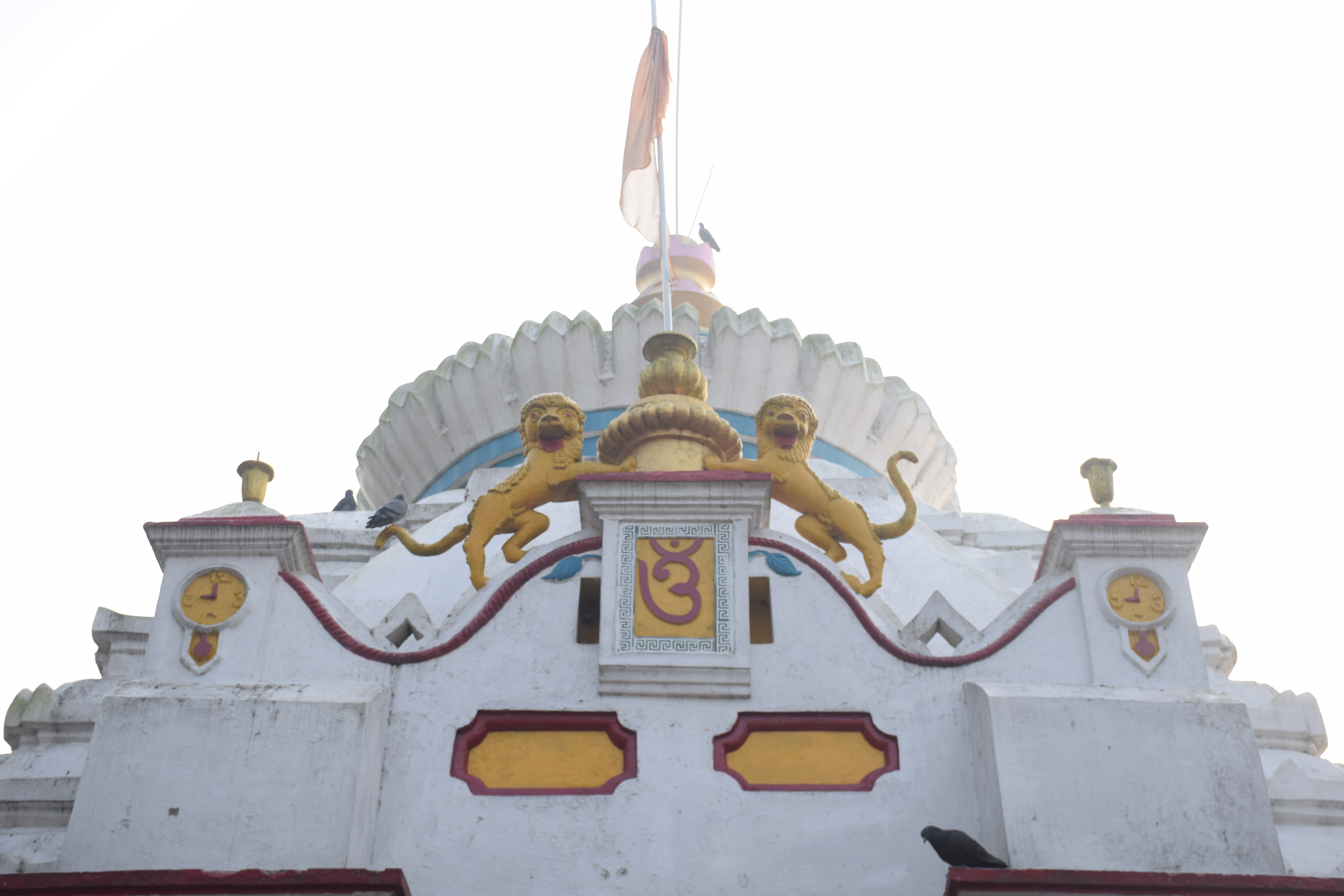
Shiva deul

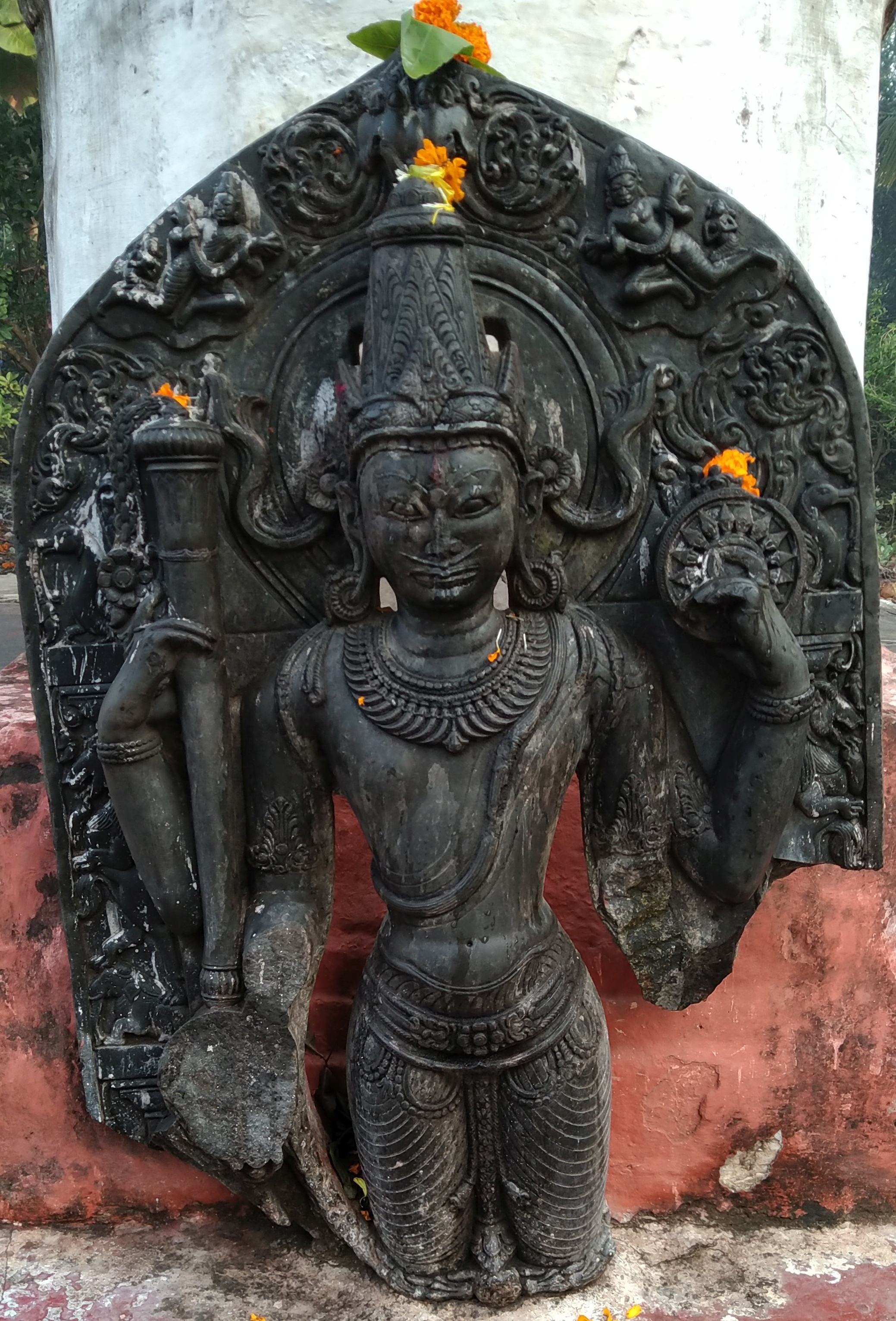
Sculpture in Shiva deul

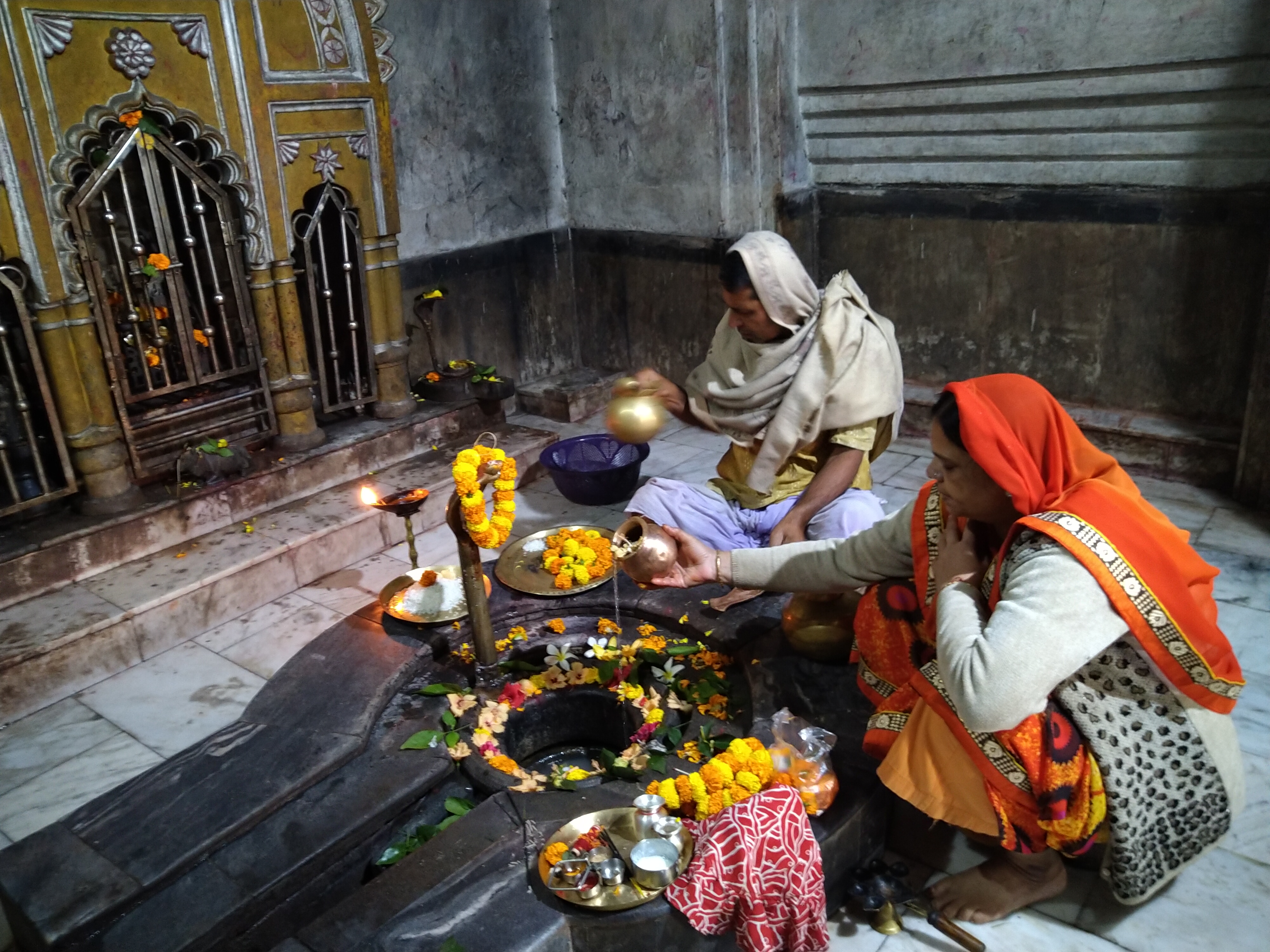
Interior of Shiva deul at Egra

== Healthcare ==
The Egra Subdivisional Hospital has 68 beds. Also in Egra are the Egra Super Speciality Hospital and many private nursing homes.
