= Egra I =

- Community development block
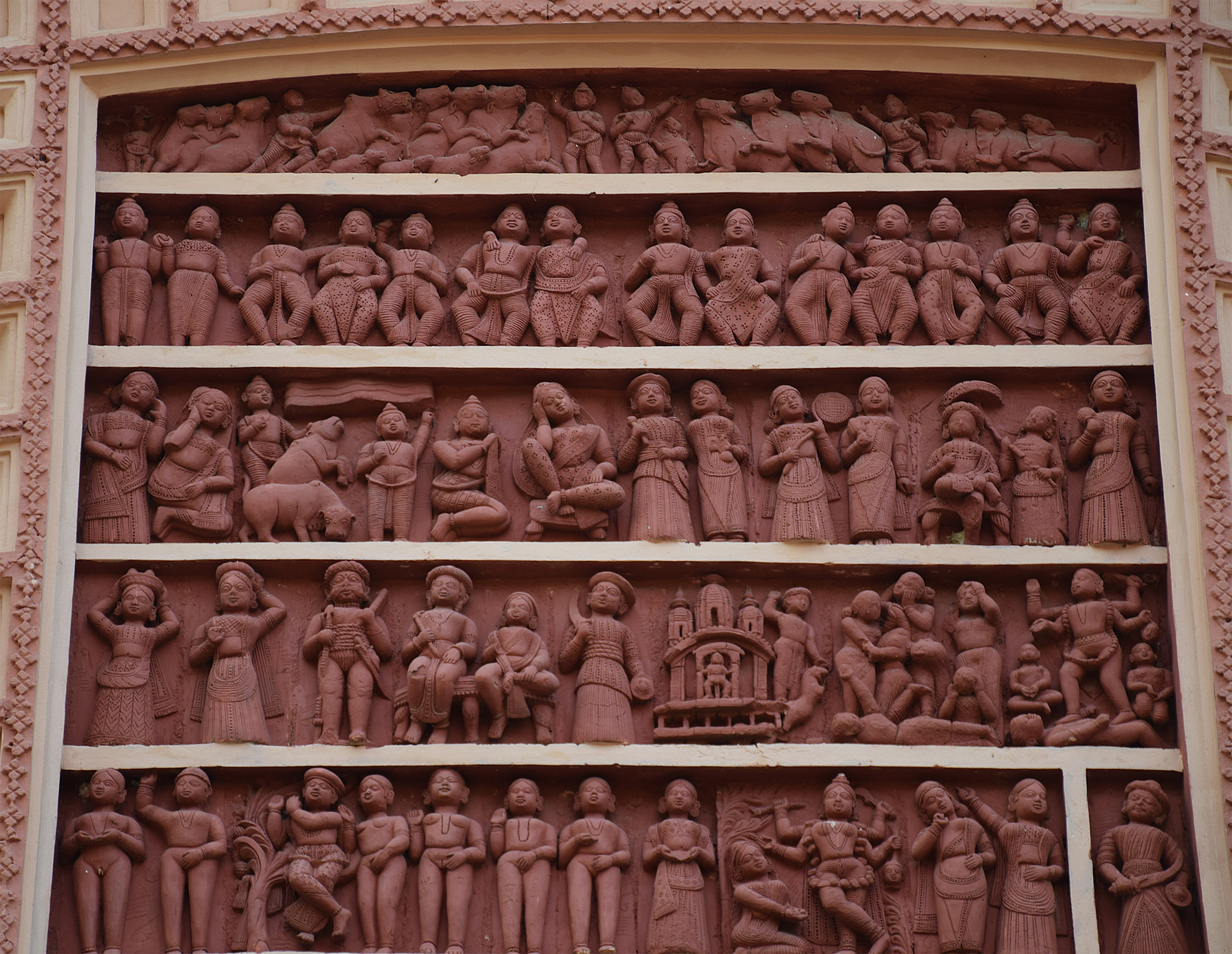
- Terracotta design work at Alangiri temple

- Location in West Bengal, India
- Coordinates: 21.90°N 87.53°E
- Country: India
- State: West Bengal
- District: Purba Medinipur

Government
  - Type: Community development block

Area
  - Total: 197.10 km^{2} (76.10 sq mi)
- Elevation: 19 m (62 ft)

Population (2011)
  - Total: 167,163
  - Density: 848.11/km^{2} (2,196.6/sq mi)

Languages
  - Official: Bengali, English
- Time zone: UTC+5:30 (IST)
- PIN: 721429 (Egra); 721447 (Panchrol)
- Area code: 03229
- ISO 3166 code: IN-WB
- Vehicle registration: WB-29, WB-30, WB-31, WB-32, WB-33
- Literacy: 82.83%
- Lok Sabha constituency: Midnapore
- Vidhan Sabha constituency: Egra
- Website: purbamedinipur.gov.in

Egra I is a community development block that forms an administrative division in Egra subdivision of Purba Medinipur district in the Indian state of West Bengal.

== Geography ==
Purba Medinipur district is part of the lower Indo-Gangetic Plain and Eastern coastal plains. Topographically, the district can be divided into two parts – (a) almost entirely flat plains on the west, east and north, (b) the coastal plains on the south. The vast expanse of land is formed of alluvium and is composed of younger and coastal alluvial. The elevation of the district is within 10 metres above mean sea level. The district has a long coastline of 65.5 km along its southern and south eastern boundary. Five coastal CD Blocks, namely, Khejuri II, Contai II (Deshapran), Contai I, Ramnagar I and II, are occasionally affected by cyclones and tornadoes. Tidal floods are quite regular in these five CD Blocks. Normally floods occur in 21 of the 25 CD Blocks in the district. The major rivers are Haldi, Rupnarayan, Rasulpur, Bagui and Keleghai, flowing in north to south or south-east direction. River water is an important source of irrigation. The district has a low 899 hectare forest cover, which is 0.02% of its geographical area.

Egra is located at 21°54′N 87°32′E. This is basically in Rural Area

Egra I CD Block is bounded by Patashpur II CD Block in the north, Egra II CD Block in the east, Ramnagar I CD Block in the south and Dantan II and Mohanpur CD Blocks, in Paschim Medinipur district, and Bhograi Block/Tehsil in Balasore district of Odisha, in the west.

It is located 68 km from Tamluk, the district headquarters.

Egra I CD Block has an area of 197.10 km^{2}. It has 1 panchayat samity, 8 gram panchayats, 122 gram sansads (village councils), 133 mouzas and 123 inhabited villages. Egra police station serves this block. Headquarters of this CD Block is at Kudi.

Gram panchayats of Egra I block/ panchayat samiti are: Barida, Chhatri, Jerthan, Jumki, Kasba Egra, Panchrol, Rishi Bankimchandra and Sahara.

== Demographics ==
=== Population ===
As per 2011 Census of India Egra I CD Block had a total population of 167,163, all of which were rural. There were 86,458 (52%) males and 80,705 (48%) females. Population below 6 years was 18,870. Scheduled Castes numbered 15,461 (9.25%) and Scheduled Tribes numbered 2,617 (1.57%).

As per 2001 census, Egra I block had a total population of 145,038, out of which 74,021 were males and 71,017 were females. Egra I block registered a population growth of -2.60 per cent during the 1991-2001 decade. Decadal growth for the combined Midnapore district was 14.87 per cent. Decadal growth in West Bengal was 17.84 per cent.

Large villages (with 4,000+ population) in Egra I CD Block (2011 census figures in brackets): Barida (4,630), Jerthan (6,568), Alangiri (6,099), Panchrol (5,615), Chatla (5,443), Nagua (4,396), Rasan (4,114) and Chhatri (7,186).

Other villages in Egra I CD Block (2011 census figures in brackets): Sahara (2,378).

=== Literacy ===
As per the 2011 census the total number of literates in Egra I CD Block was 122,834 (82.83% of the population over 6 years) out of which 68,827 (56%) were males and 54,007 (44%) were females.

As per the 2011 census, literacy in Purba Medinipur district was 87.02%. Purba Medinipur had the highest literacy amongst all the districts of West Bengal in 2011.

See also – List of West Bengal districts ranked by literacy rate

Literacy in CD blocks of
Purba Medinipur district
Tamluk subdivision
Tamluk – 87.06%
Sahid Matangini – 86.99%
Panskura I – 83.65%
Panskura II – 84.93%
Nandakumar – 85.56%
Chandipur – 87.81%
Moyna – 86.33%
Haldia subdivision
Mahishadal – 86.21%
Nandigram I – 84.89%
Nandigram II – 89.16%
Sutahata – 85.42%
Haldia – 85.96%
Contai subdivision
Contai I – 89.32%
Contai II – 88.33%
Contai III – 89.88%
Khejuri I – 88.90%
Khejuri II – 85.37%
Ramnagar I – 87.84%
Ramnagar II – 89.38%
Bhagabanpur II – 90.98%
Egra subdivision
Bhagabanpur I – 88.13%
Egra I – 82.83%
Egra II – 86.47%
Patashpur I – 86.58%
Patashpur II – 86.50%
2011 Census: CD Block Wise

Primary Census Abstract Data

=== Language and religion ===
Religion in Egra I CD block (2011)
Hinduism	85.22%
Islam	14.68%
Other or not stated	0.10%

In the 2011 census Hindus numbered 142,451 and formed 85.22% of the population in Egra I CD Block. Muslims numbered 24,539 and formed 14.68% of the population. Others numbered 173 and formed 0.10% of the population. In 2001, Hindus made up 86.91% and Muslims 12.92% of the population respectively.

Languages of Egra I CD block (2011)
1. Bengali (94.5%)
2. Hindi (1.22%)
3. Urdu (0.91%)
4. Santali (0.90%)
5. Others (2.52%)

According to the 2011 census, 94.45% of the population spoke Bengali, 3.14% Hindi, 0.91% Urdu and 0.90% Santali as their first language.

== Rural poverty ==
The District Human Development Report for Purba Medinipur has provided a CD Block-wise data table for Modified Human Poverty Index of the district. Egra I CD Block registered 21.31 on the MHPI scale. The CD Block-wise mean MHPI was estimated at 24.78. Eleven out of twentyfive CD Blocks were found to be severely deprived in respect of grand CD Block average value of MHPI (CD Blocks with lower amount of poverty are better): All the CD Blocks of Haldia and Contai subdivisions appeared backward, except Ramnagar I & II, of all the blocks of Egra subdivision only Bhagabanpur I appeared backward and in Tamluk subdivision none appeared backward.

== Economy ==
=== Livelihood ===
In Egra I CD Block in 2011, total workers formed 43.66% of the total population and amongst the class of total workers, cultivators formed 38.79%, agricultural labourers 43.28%, household industry workers 2.45% and other workers 15.48%.

=== Infrastructure ===
There are 123 inhabited villages in Egra I CD block. All 123 villages (100%) have power supply. 122 villages (99.19%) have drinking water supply. 18 villages (14.63%) have post offices. 117 villages (95.12%) have telephones (including landlines, public call offices and mobile phones). 20 villages (16.26%) have a pucca (paved) approach road and 30 villages (24.39%) have transport communication (includes bus service, rail facility and navigable waterways). 19 villages (15.45%) have agricultural credit societies. 6 villages (4.88%) have banks.

In 2007–08, around 40% of rural households in the district had electricity.

In 2013–14, there were 111 fertiliser depots, 16 seed stores and 29 fair price shops in the CD Block.

=== Agriculture ===
Persons engaged in agriculture
in Egra I CD Block
1. Bargadars (5.72%)
2. Patta holders (14.8%)
3. Small farmers (2.59%)
4. Marginal farmers (35.9%)
5. Agricultural labourers (41.0%)

According to the District Human Development Report of Purba Medinipur: The agricultural sector is the lifeline of a predominantly rural economy. It is largely dependent on the Low Capacity Deep Tubewells (around 50%) or High Capacity Deep Tubewells (around 27%) for irrigation, as the district does not have a good network of canals, compared to some of the neighbouring districts. In many cases the canals are drainage canals which get the backflow of river water at times of high tide or the rainy season. The average size of land holding in Purba Medinipur, in 2005–06, was 0.73 hectares against 1.01 hectares in West Bengal.

In 2013–14, the total area irrigated in Egra I CD Block was 13,310 hectares, out of which 55 hectares were irrigated by canal water, 140 hectares by tank water, 12,115 hectares by deep tube well and 1,000 hectares by shallow tube well.

Although the Bargadari Act of 1950 recognised the rights of bargadars to a higher share of crops from the land that they tilled, it was not implemented fully. Large tracts, beyond the prescribed limit of land ceiling, remained with the rich landlords. From 1977 onwards major land reforms took place in West Bengal. Land in excess of land ceiling was acquired and distributed amongst the peasants. Following land reforms land ownership pattern has undergone transformation. In 2013–14, persons engaged in agriculture in Egra I CD Block could be classified as follows: bargadars 5.72%, patta (document) holders 14.83%, small farmers (possessing land between 1 and 2 hectares) 2.59%, marginal farmers (possessing land up to 1 hectare) 35.86% and agricultural labourers 41.00%.

In 2013–14, Egra I CD Block produced 22,289 tonnes of Aman paddy, the main winter crop, from 16,715 hectares and 33,623 tonnes of Boro paddy, the spring crop, from 10,480 hectares. It also produced pulses and oilseeds.

Betelvine is a major source of livelihood in Purba Medinipur district, particularly in Tamluk and Contai subdivisions. Betelvine production in 2008-09 was the highest amongst all the districts and was around a third of the total state production. In 2008–09, Purba Mednipur produced 2,789 tonnes of cashew nuts from 3,340 hectares of land.

Concentration of Handicraft Activities in CD Blocks
- Horn Craft - Kolaghat
- Pata Chitra - Chandipur, Nandakumar
- Sea Shell – Ramnagar I & II
- Mat & Mat Diversified Products – Ramnagar I, Egra I & II, Patashpur I
- Brass & Bell Metal – Ramnagar I, Mahisadal, Patashpur II, Egra I
- Diversified Jute Products – Ramnagar II, Nandakumar, Kolaghat, Shahid Matangini
- Cane & Bamboo Products - Chandipur, Nandakumar, Kolaghat, Shahid Matangini
- Sola Craft - Tamluk, Kolaghat
- Pottery/Terracotta - Panskura, Tamluk, Sahid Matangini, Nandakumar
- Wood Craft - Tamluk
- Zari work- Sutahta, Mahisadal, Haldia, Nandakumar

Source: District Human Development Report, Purba Medinipur, Page 97

=== Pisciculture ===
Purba Medinipur's net district domestic product derives one fifth of its earnings from fisheries, the highest amongst all the districts of West Bengal. The nett area available for effective pisciculture in Egra I CD Block in 2013-14 was 735.15 hectares. 1,990 persons were engaged in the profession and approximate annual production was 28,009 quintals.

=== Banking ===
In 2013–14, Egra I CD Block had offices of 6 commercial banks and 1 gramin bank.

=== Backward Regions Grant Fund ===
Medinipur East district is listed as a backward region and receives financial support from the Backward Regions Grant Fund. The fund, created by the Government of India, is designed to redress regional imbalances in development. As of 2012, 272 districts across the country were listed under this scheme. The list includes 11 districts of West Bengal.

== Transport ==
Egra I CD Block has 13 originating/ terminating bus routes. The nearest railway station is 23 km from the CD Block headquarters.

SH 5 connecting Rupnarayanpur (in Bardhaman district) and Junput (in Purba Medinipur district) passes through Egra.

== Education ==
In 2013–14, Egra I CD Block had 105 primary schools with 6,951 students, 25 middle schools with 2,704 students, 10 high schools with 7,620 students and 11 higher secondary schools with 15,037 students. Egra I CD Block had 310 institutions for special and non-formal education with 11,801 students.

As per the 2011 census, in Egra I CD block, amongst the 123 inhabited villages, 12 villages did not have a school, 38 villages had two or more primary schools, 38 villages had at least 1 primary and 1 middle school and 21 villages had at least 1 middle and 1 secondary school.

Egra Sarada Shashi Bhusan College was established at Egra (a municipal city outside this CD block) in 1968.

== Healthcare ==
In 2014, Egra I CD Block had 1 block primary health centre, 2 primary health centres and 1 nursing home with total 20 beds and 6 doctors (excluding private bodies). It had 25 family welfare sub centres. 439 patients were treated indoor and 45,786 patients were treated outdoor in the hospitals, health centres and subcentres of the CD Block.

Ramchandrapur Block Primary Health Centre at Ramchandrapur, PO Kharbandhi (with 10 beds) is the main medical facility in Egra I CD block. There are primary health centres at Chatla (with 2 beds) and Kasabagola, PO Panchrol (with 2 beds).
