= Panchrol =

Panchrol or Pohuchuli
- Village
- Nickname: Pohuchuli
- Location in West Bengal, India Panchrol or Pohuchuli (India)
- Coordinates: 21.8331°N 87.4527°E
- Country: India
- State: West Bengal
- District: Purba Medinipur

Government
  - Type: Panchayat
  - Body: Panchrol Gram Panchayat

Population (2011)
  - Total: 5,615

Languages
  - Official: Bengali, English
- Time zone: UTC+5:30 (IST)
- PIN: 721447
- Telephone/STD code: 03229
- Lok Sabha constituency: Midnapore
- Vidhan Sabha constituency: Egra
- Website: purbamedinipur.gov.in

Panchrol (পাঁচরোল)is a village and a gram panchayat in the Egra I CD block in the Egra subdivision of the Purba Medinipur district in the state of West Bengal, India.

== History ==
In the Egra copper plate inscription recovered at Panchrol, it is mentioned that Ekatakaksha was an administrative centre during the rule of Shashanka.

== Geography ==
Cities and towns in Egra subdivision of Purba Medinipur district
M: municipal city/ town, CT: census town, R: rural/ urban centre, H: historical/ religious centre.
Owing to space constraints in the small map, the actual locations in a larger map may vary slightly

=== Location ===
Panchrol is located at 21.8331°N 87.4527°E.

=== Urbanisation ===
96.96% of the population of Egra subdivision live in the rural areas. Only 3.04% of the population live in the urban areas, and that is the lowest proportion of urban population amongst the four subdivisions in Purba Medinipur district.

Note: The map alongside presents some of the notable locations in the subdivision. All places marked in the map are linked in the larger full screen map.

== Demographics ==
According to the 2011 Census of India, Panchrol had a total population of 5,615, of which 2913 (52%) were males and 2,702 (48%) were females. There were 543 persons in the age range of 0–6 years. The total number of literate persons in Panchrol was 4,425 (87.24% of the population over 6 years).

== Culture ==
David J. McCutchion mentions:

- The Sharabhuja temple as a large Chandni or dalan type with verandah on three or more sides, measuring 27’ 3" x 42’ 9", with terracotta and stucco work, belonging to the mid-19th century.
- The Madana Mohana temple belongs to the same category, measuring 24’ 3" x 39’ 7", largely plain, belonging to the mid-19th century.
- The Vrindavanjiu temple belongs to the same category, measuring 24’ 3" x 25" 3", with terracotta and stucco work, built in 1909.
- The Radha Vinoda temple is flat-roofed with smooth rekha superstructure, measuring 25" x 35’ 2", with rich stucco work, built possibly in 1816. The upper rekha deul has a porch with cornice and straight ridging.

== Panchrol picture gallery ==
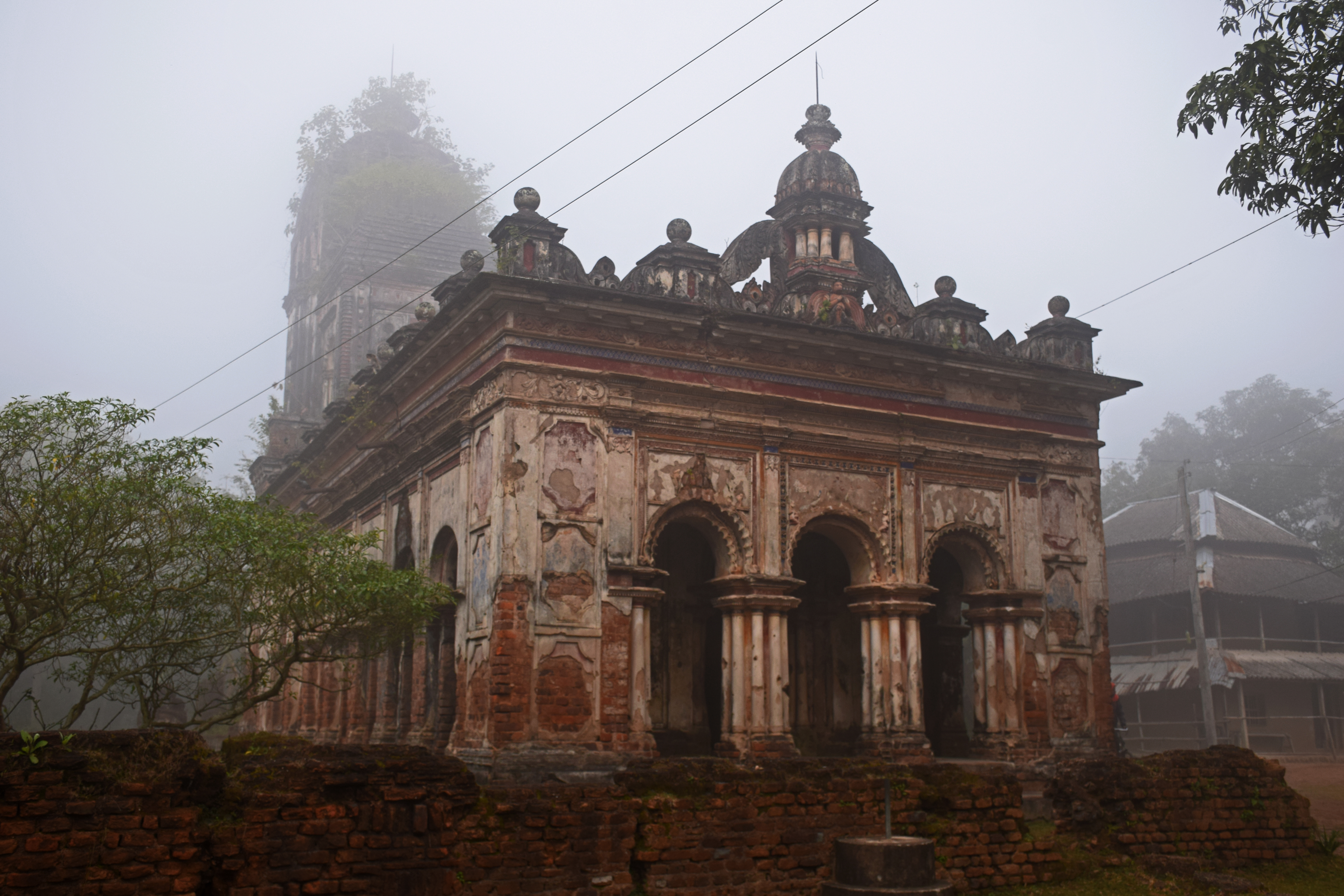
Radha Binoda temple

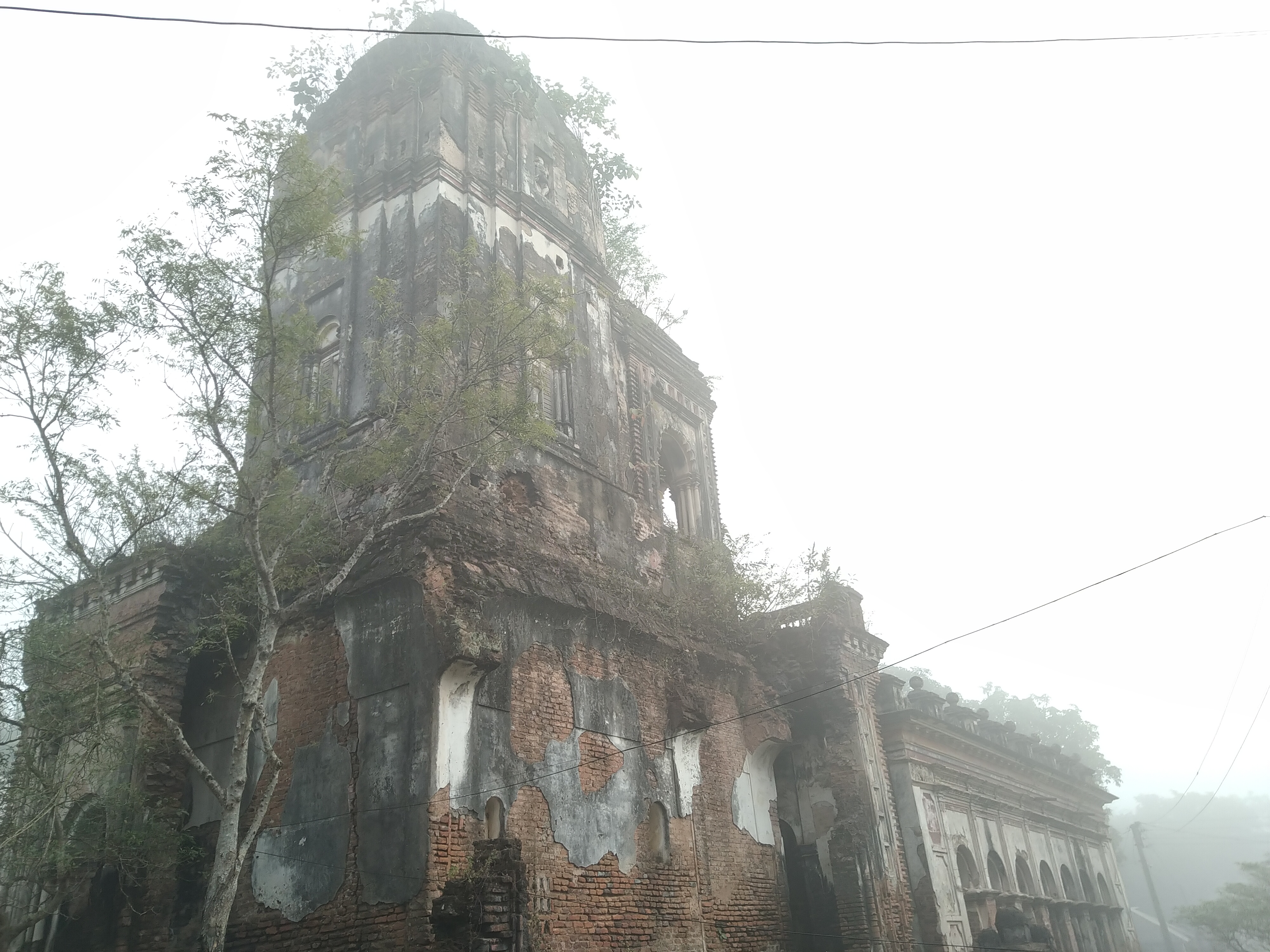
Radha Binoda temple

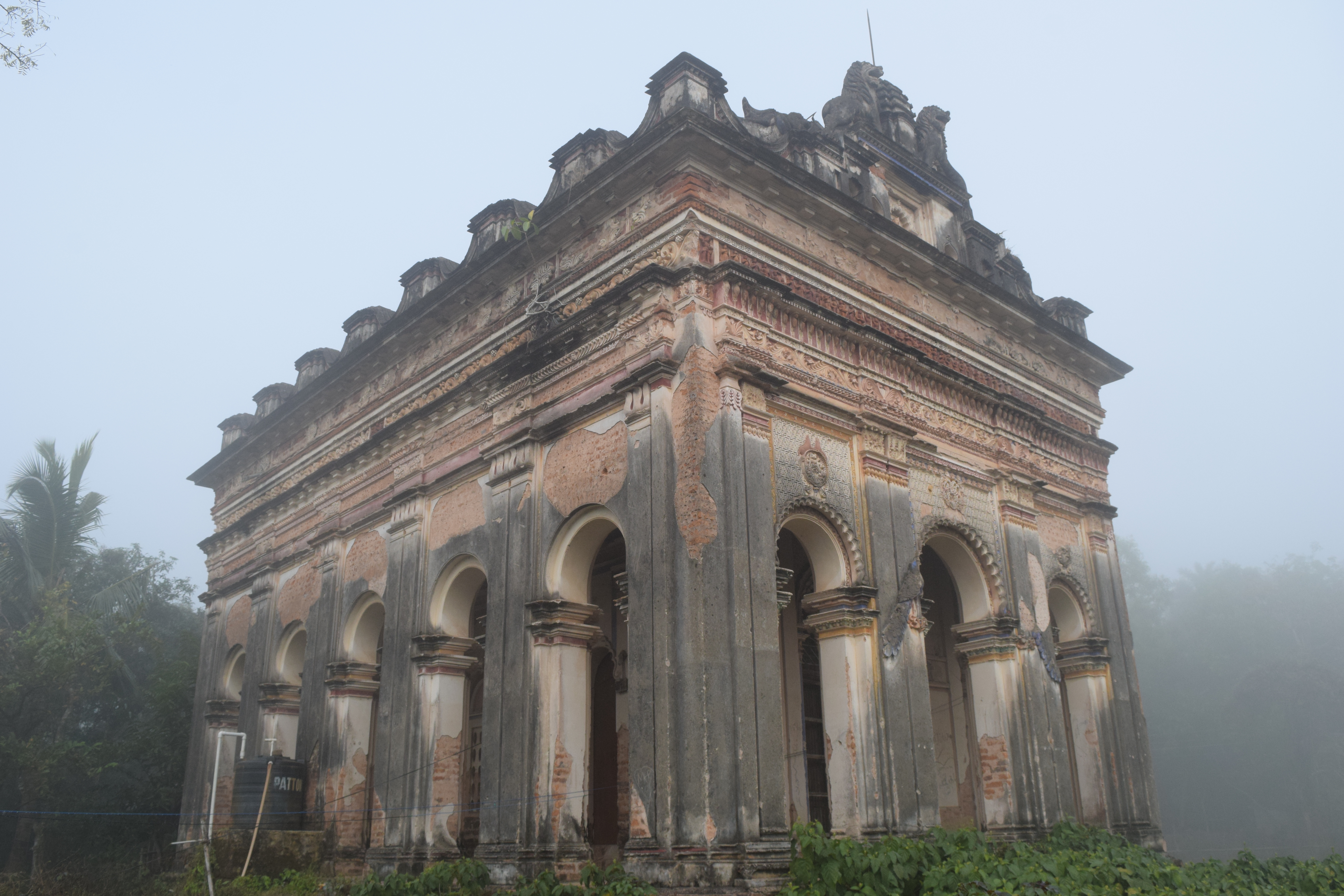
Sharabhuja Gauranga temple

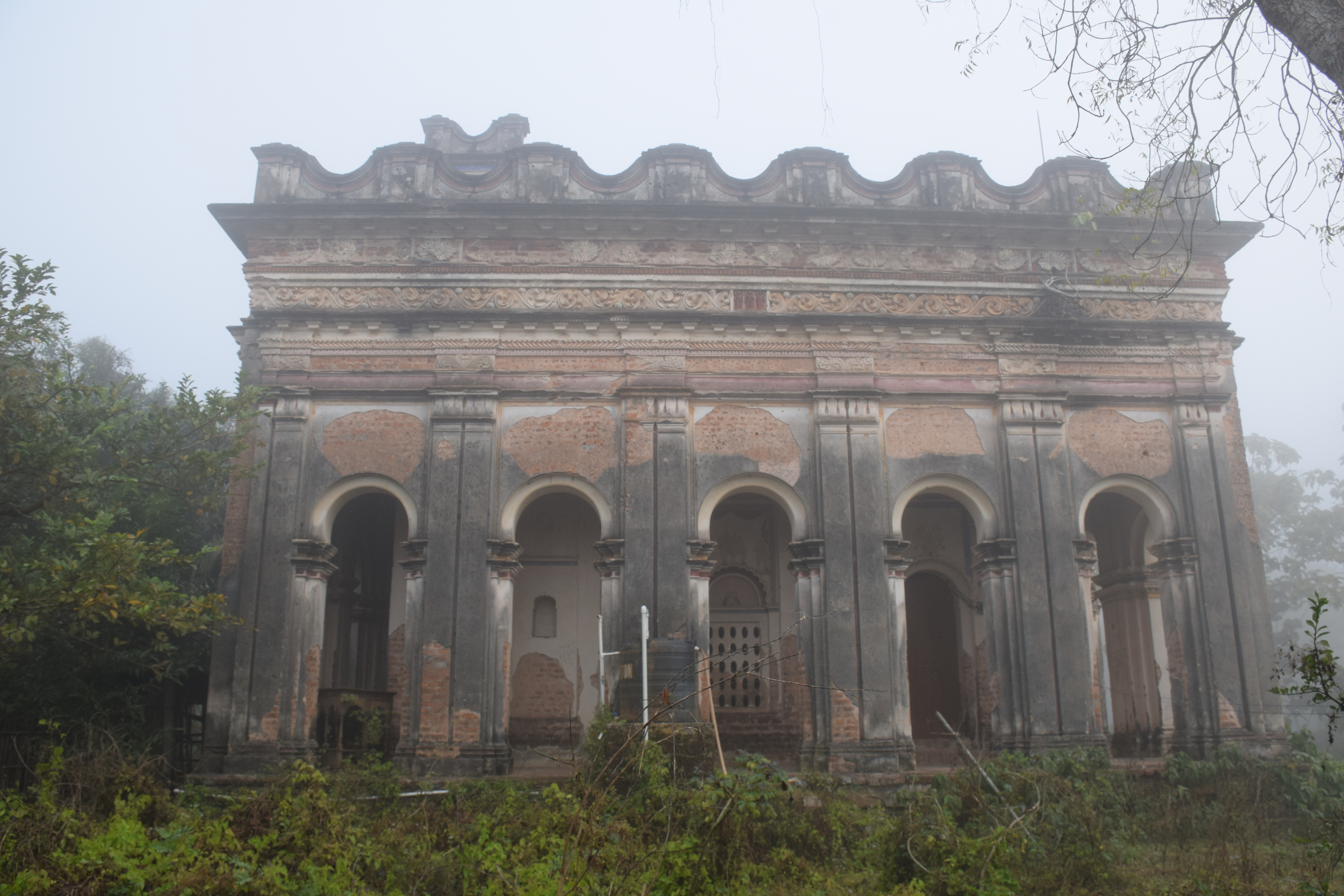
Sharabhuja Gauranga temple

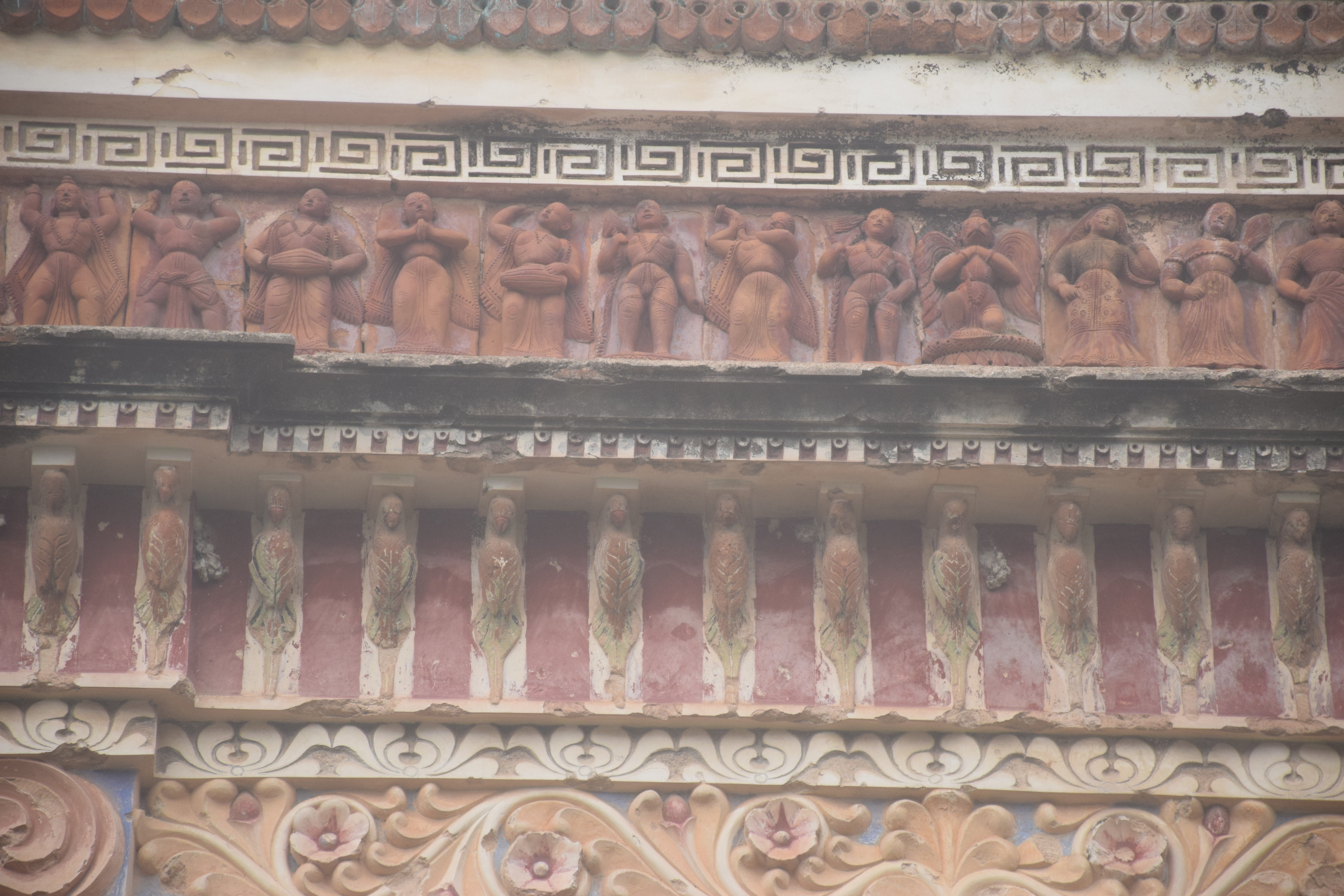
Terracotta relief at Gauranga temple

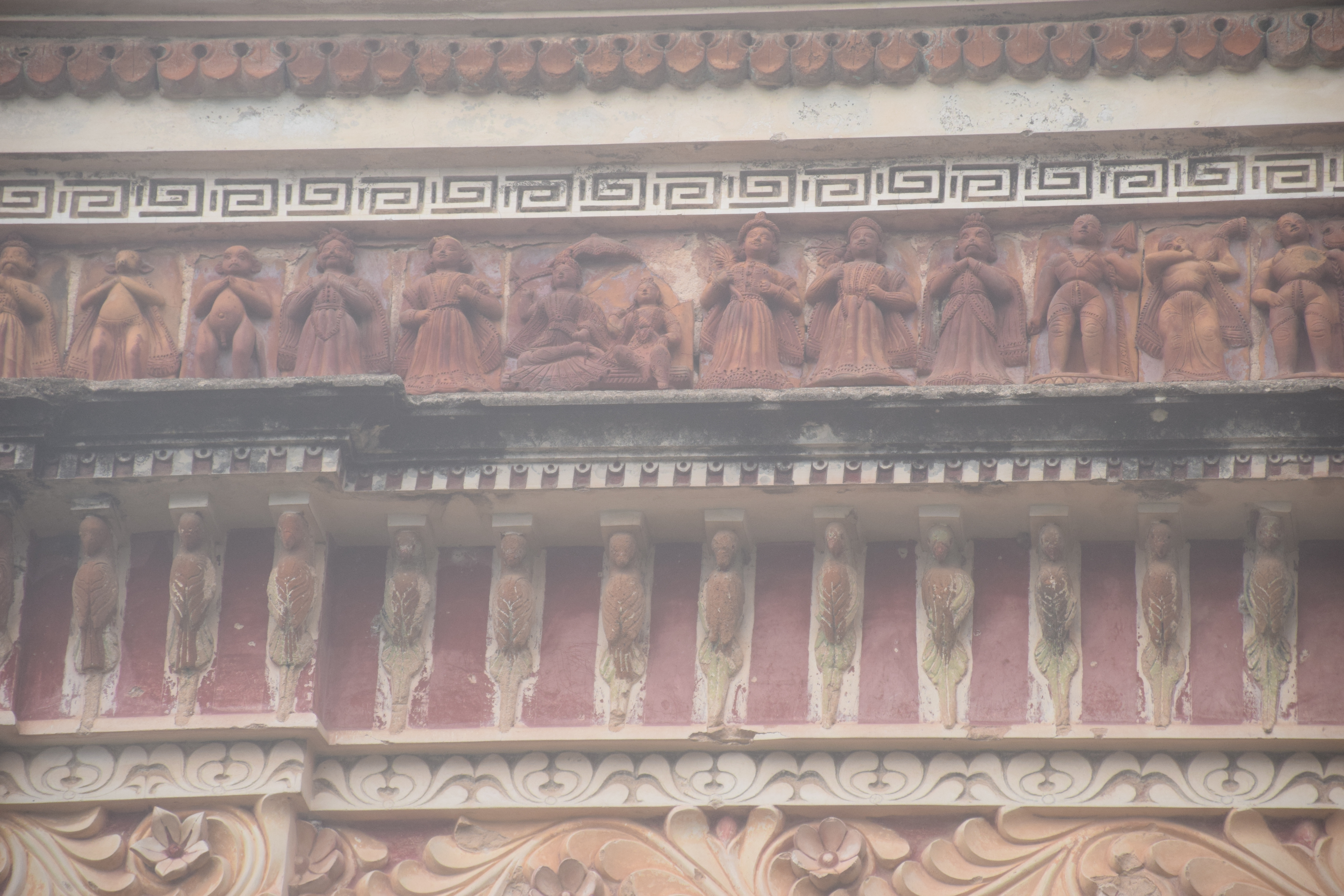
Terracotta relief at Gauranga temple

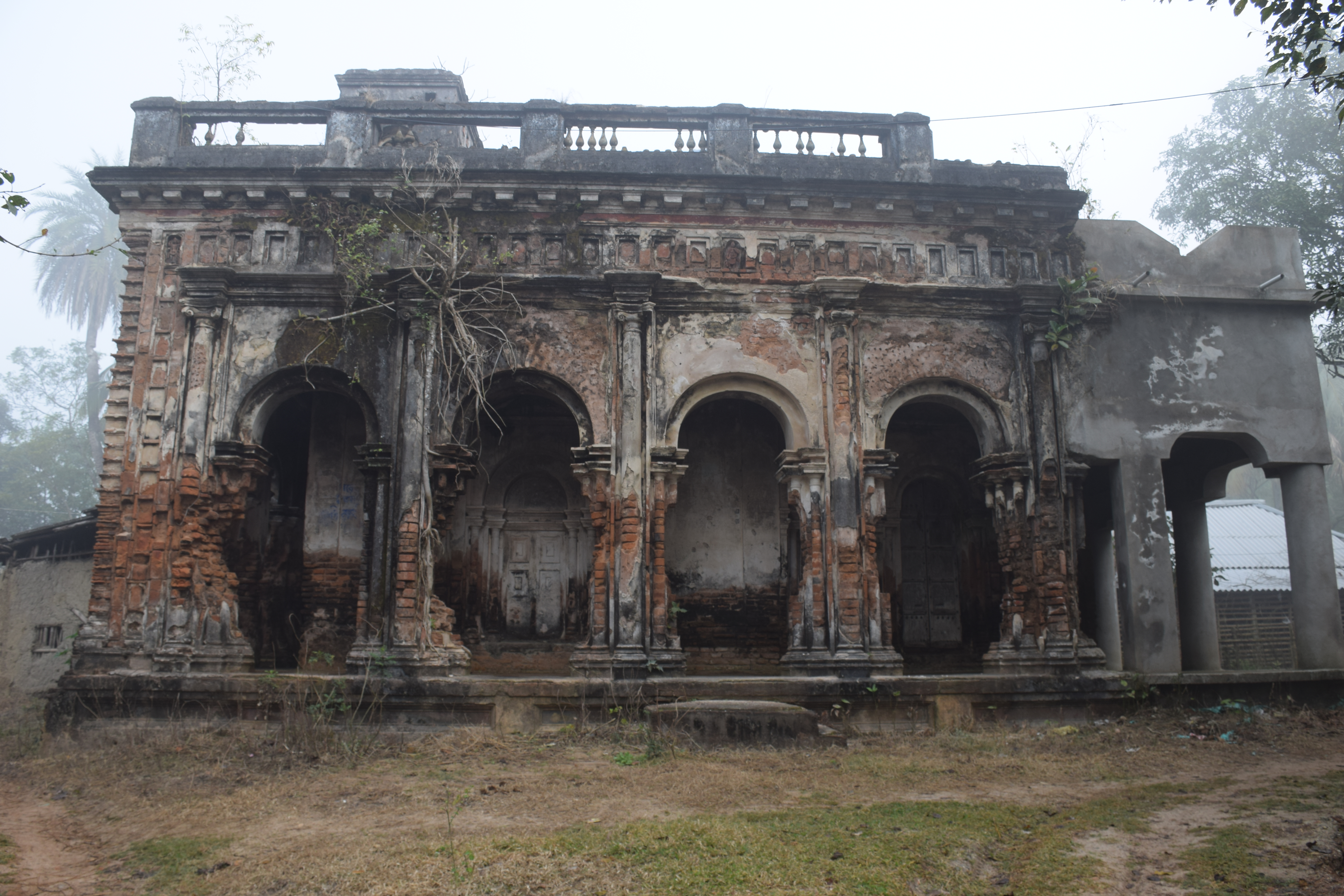
Madan Mohan temple

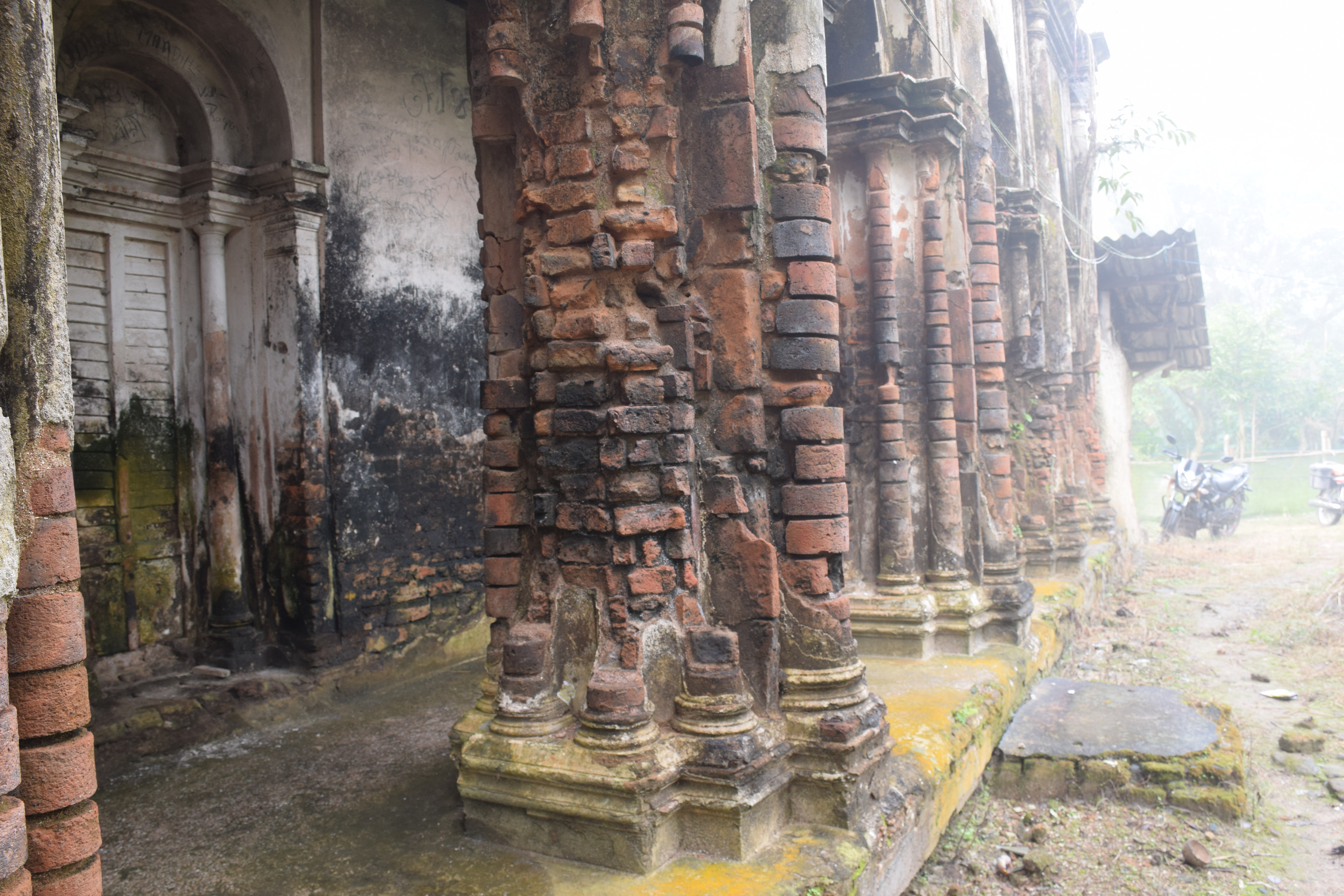
Madan Mohan temple

== Healthcare ==
There is a primary health centre at Kasabagola, PO Panchrol (with 2 beds).
