= Alangiri =

- Village
- Location in West Bengal, India Alangiri (India)
- Coordinates: 21.8534°N 87.4677°E
- Country: India
- State: West Bengal
- District: Purba Medinipur

Population (2011)
  - Total: 6,099

Languages
  - Official: Bengali, Oriya, English
- Time zone: UTC+5:30 (IST)
- PIN: 721420
- Telephone/STD code: 03229
- Lok Sabha constituency: Midnapore
- Vidhan Sabha constituency: Egra
- Website: purbamedinipur.gov.in

Alangiri is a village in the Egra I CD block in the Egra subdivision of the Purba Medinipur district in the state of West Bengal, India.

== Geography ==
Cities and towns in Egra subdivision of Purba Medinipur district
M: municipal city/ town, CT: census town, R: rural/ urban centre, H: historical/ religious centre.
Owing to space constraints in the small map, the actual locations in a larger map may vary slightly

=== Location ===
Alangiri is located at 21.8534°N 87.4677°E.

=== Urbanisation ===
96.96% of the population of Egra subdivision live in the rural areas. Only 3.04% of the population live in the urban areas, and that is the lowest proportion of urban population amongst the four subdivisions in Purba Medinipur district.

Note: The map alongside presents some of the notable locations in the subdivision. All places marked in the map are linked in the larger full screen map.

== Demographics ==
According to the 2011 Census of India, Alangiri had a total population of 6,099, of which 3,186 (52%) were males and 2,913 (48%) were females. There were 628 persons in the age range of 0–6 years. The total number of literate persons in Alangiri was 4,438 (81.12% of the population over 6 years).

== Culture ==
David J. McCutchion mentions:

- The Gokulananda Kisora temple is an eka-ratna with rekha tower of the tall south Midnapore type, measuring 17’ 8 x 15’ 5" plain with a large attached porch measuring 21’ 1’’ x 13’ 10" with terracotta lotuses. (The ruinous Lakshmi temple is also of this type).
- The Raghunatha temple is a West Bengal nava-ratna with rigged turrets measuring 29’ square, with rich terracotta façade, construction begun in 1810.
- The Rasamancha of Raghunatha is an octagonal structure with straight cornices following the nava-ratna style with ‘baroque’ vase pinnacles, measuring 5’ 3" having terracotta on eight sides.Great place.

== Alangiri picture gallery ==
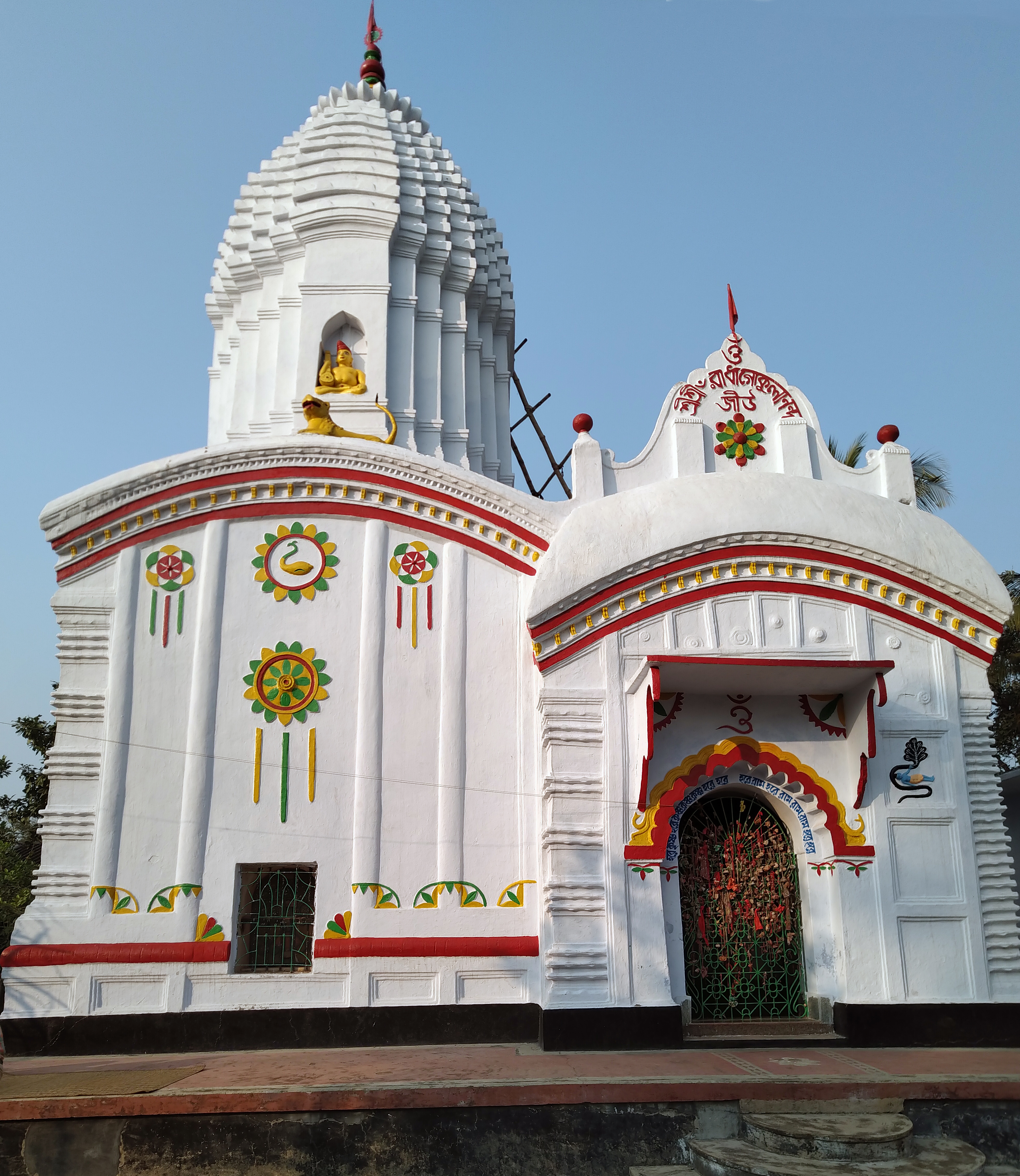
Radha Gokulananda temple

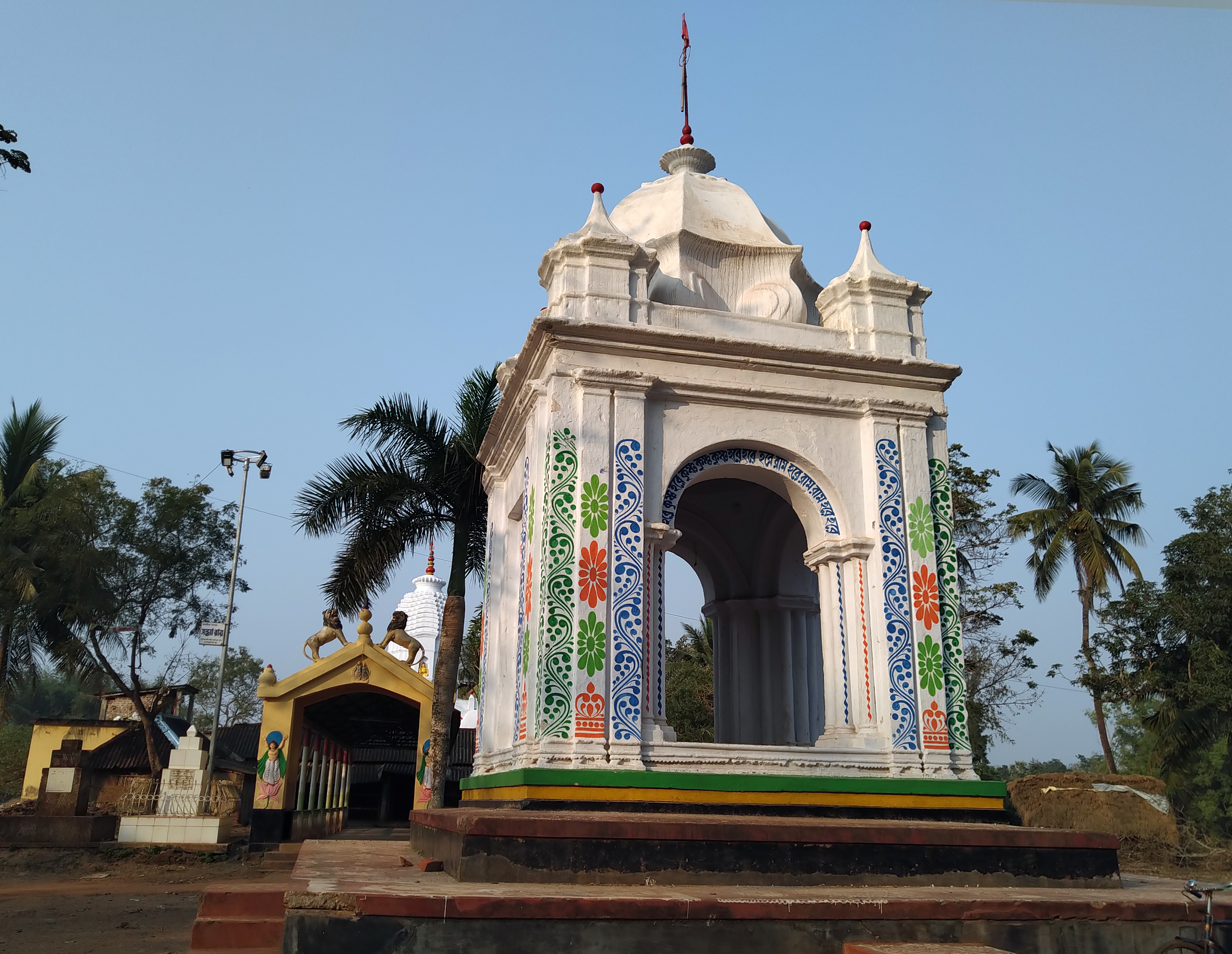
Rasmancha of Gokulananda temple

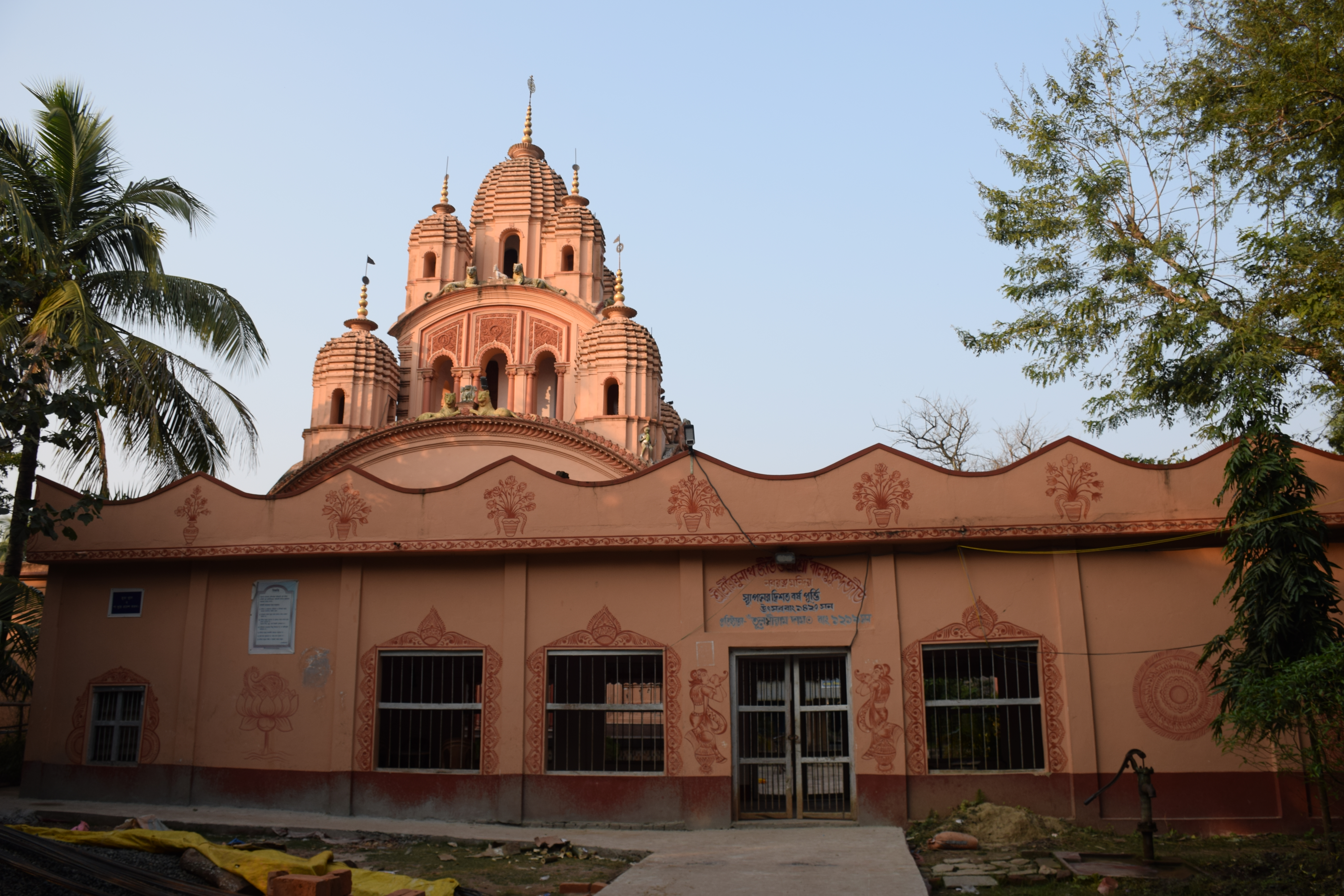
Raghunatha temple

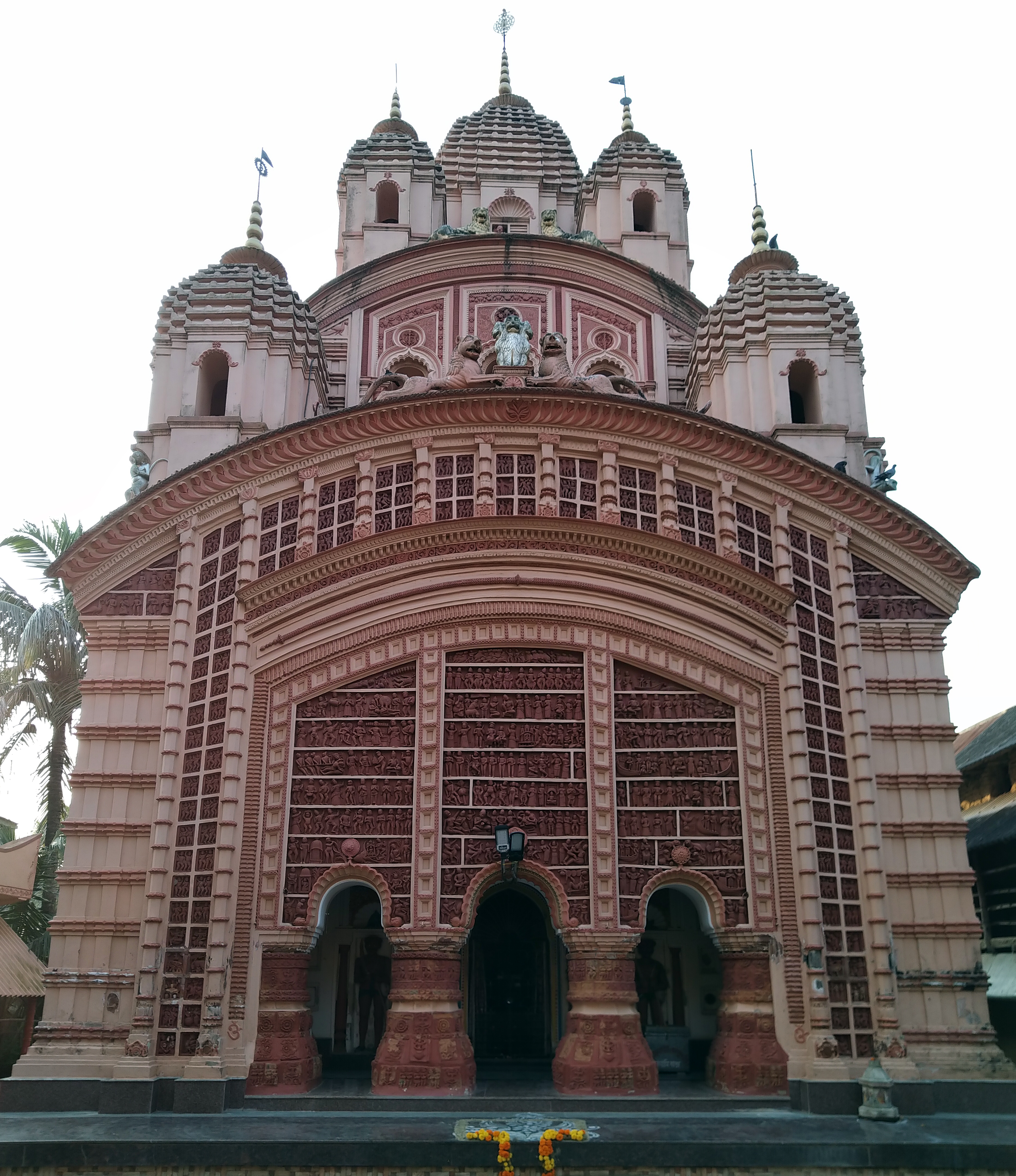
Raghunatha temple

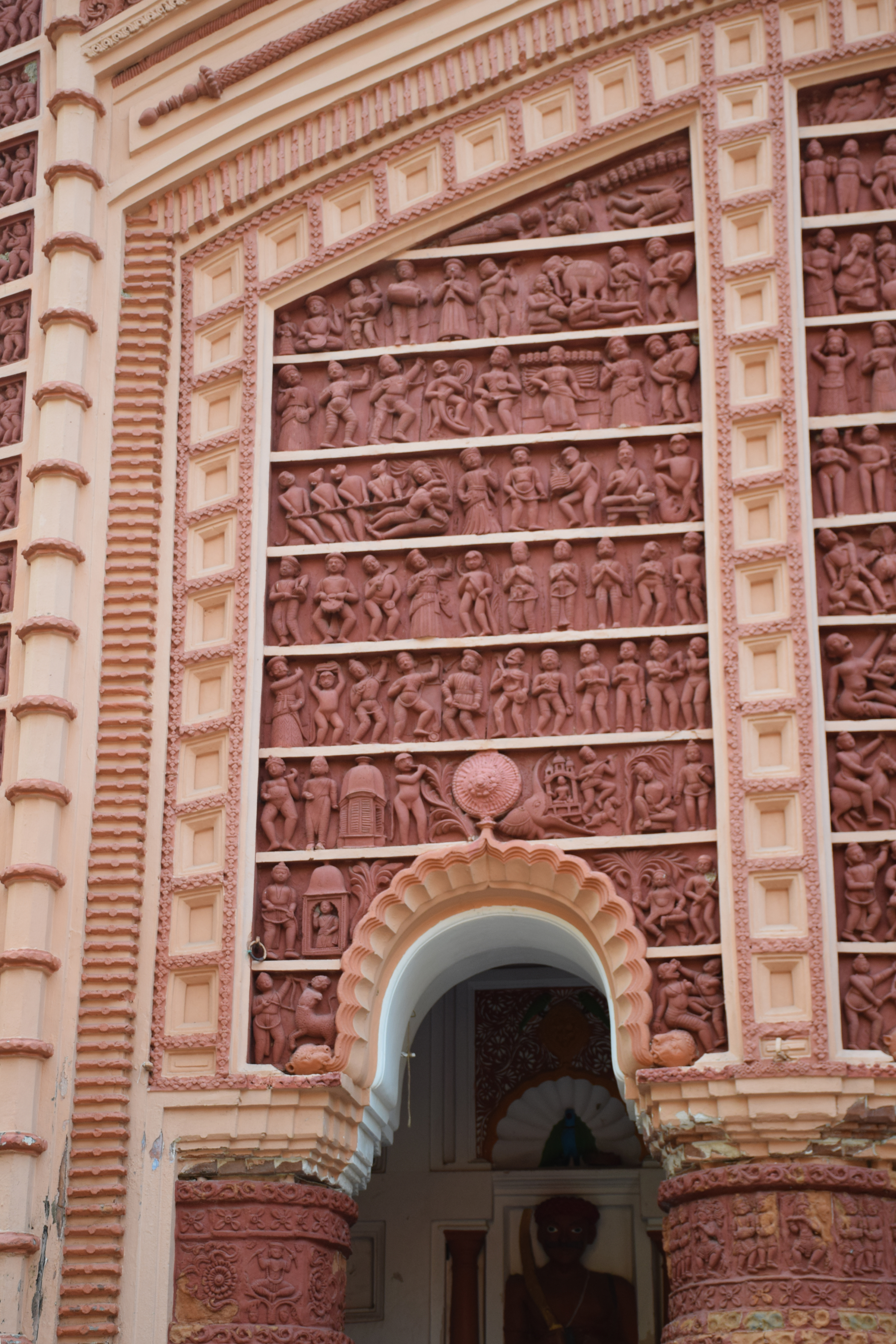
Terracotta panel at Raghunatha temple

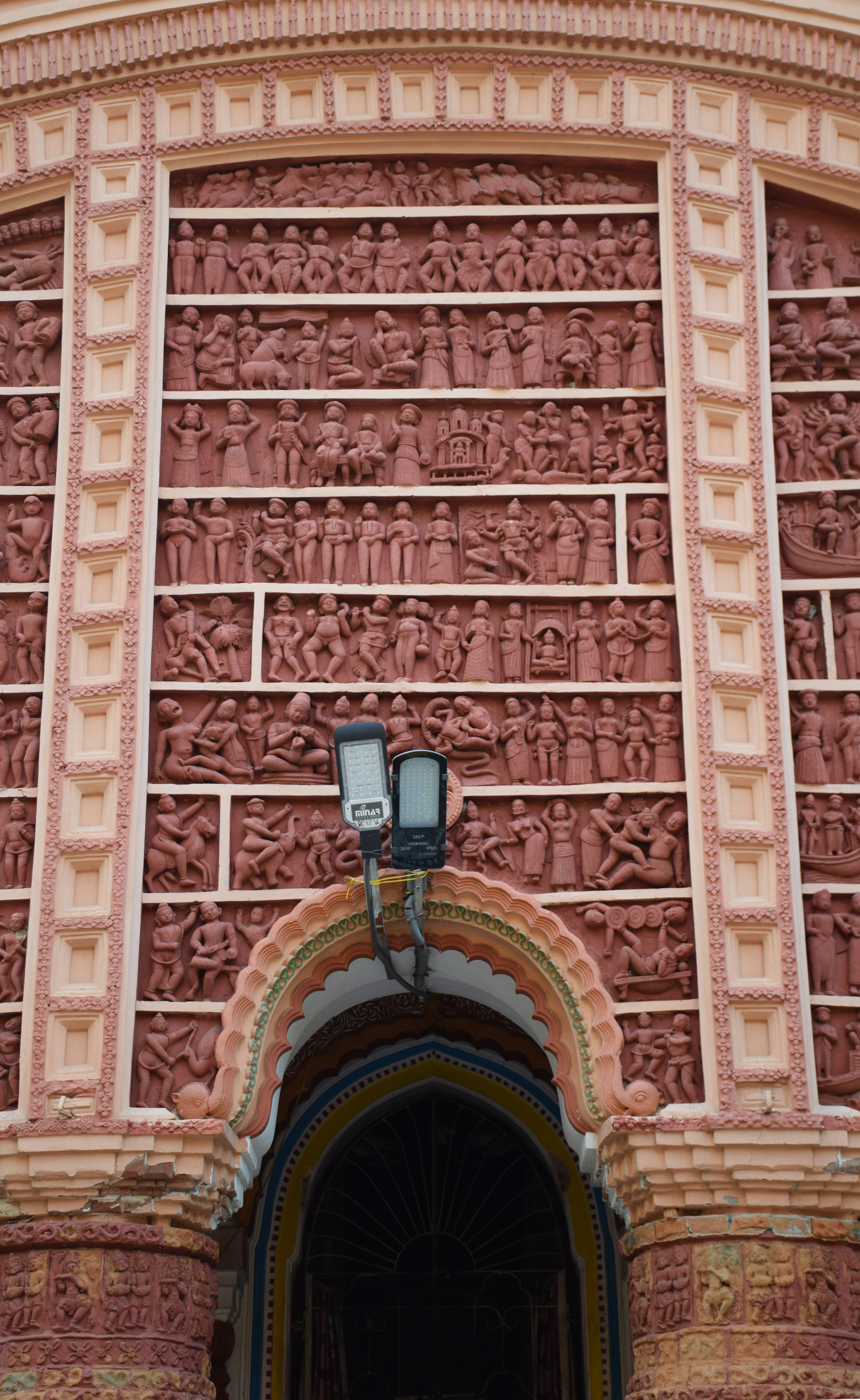
Terracotta panel at Raghunatha temple

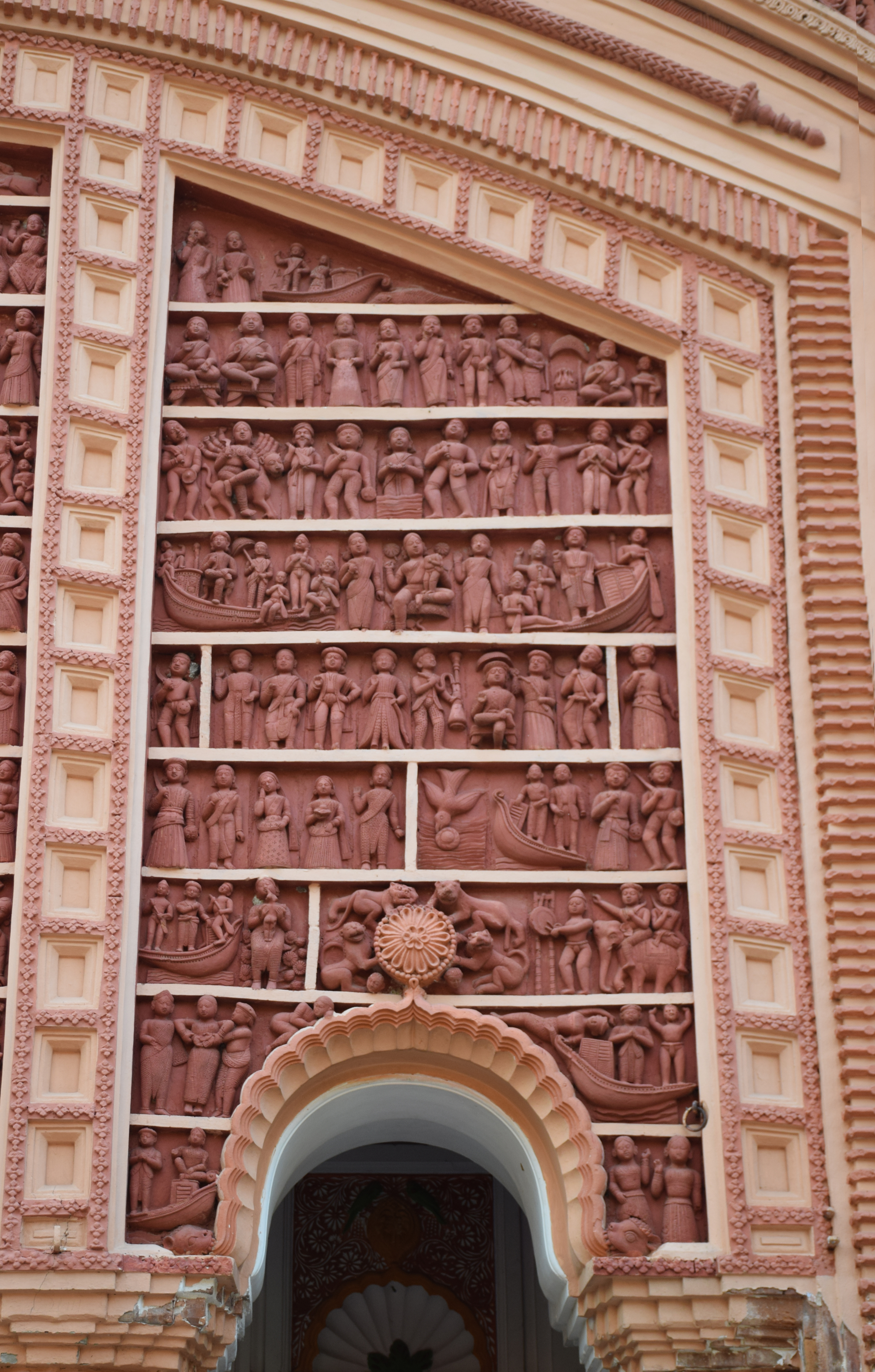
Terracotta panel at Raghunatha temple
